= Daniel Mercier =

French footballer (1892–1914)

Personal information
- Full name: Daniel Esteve Mercier
- Date of birth: 2 July 1892
- Place of birth: Saint-Denis, France
- Date of death: 22 August 1914 (aged 22)
- Place of death: Ethe, Belgium
- Height: 1.68 m (5 ft 6 in)
- Position: Defender

Senior career*
Years	Team	Apps	(Gls)
1909–1912	Étoile des Deux Lacs		
1912–1914	Étoile sportive du XIIIe		

International career
1910	France	3	(0)
- * Club domestic league appearances and goals

Daniel Esteve Mercier (2 July 1892 – 22 August 1914) was a French footballer who played as a defender for Étoile des Deux Lacs and the French national team between 1909 and 1911.

== Early life ==
Born in Saint-Denis on 2 July 1892, Mercier lived most of his life in the 16th arrondissement of Paris, barely 300 meters from the parish church of Saint-Honoré d'Eylau, where the Étoile des Deux Lacs was based.

== Playing career ==
Mercier began his football career in late 1909, aged 17, playing as a defender for the Étoile club, one of the many Catholic clubs affiliated with the Gymnastic and Sports Federation of French Patronages (FGSPF), whose general secretary Charles Simon, was also the head of the Étoile club. Together with Henri Mouton, Henri Bellocq, Maurice Olivier, and Jean Ducret, he was a member of the Étoile team that faced the English Wanders in October 1910, which ended in a 12–0 loss.

Mercier was a combative and fiery player who often played on the volley, not only to clear, but also to shoot, executing both of these techniques powerfully, so much so, that the local press once stated that he "should play less hard". These qualities made him a versatile footballer, who was capable of "playing in all positions", mainly as a defender, but also at number 9; for instance, he even scored two goals in December 1910, thanks to his powerful volley shots.

Mercier earned all of his three international caps for France within two months in April and May 1910, in friendly matches against Belgium, England amateurs, and Italy, all of which ended in losses with a total of 20 goals conceded. Nevertheless, the local press stated that "Mercier was excellent in every way" against the English. On his debut against the Belgians, the press stated that "the best full-back was undoubtedly Mercier, skillful and very fast". Mercier was aged only 17 years and 9 months, thus becoming the youngest-ever player of the French national team at the time, a record that has since been surpassed by fellow 17-year-olds Félix Vial (1911), Maurice Gastiger (1914), and Warren Zaire-Emery (2023). Two months later, in July 1910, he volunteered to military service for three years, but was nonetheless a substitute for France in a friendly against Luxembourg in October 1911.

In 1912, Mercier left Étoile des Deux Lacs to sign for the modest ES of the 13th arrondissement, the Étoile sportive du XIIIe, which played in the lower divisions of the USFSA championships, thus following the footsteps of fellow French international Simon Sollier. Outside football, he was a electrician.

== Later life and death ==
At the outbreak of World War I, Mercier was recalled to his regiment, the 103rd Infantry, and went to the front, where he was killed in combat on 22 August 1914, at the age of 22, in Ethe, in the Belgian Ardennes, during the Battle of the Ardennes. However, the French press only reported his disappearance at the front in September 1915, more than a year after his death.

Mercier was posthumously decorated with the Military Medal and the War Cross with bronze star.
