= André Sellier =

French footballer (1890–1920)

Personal information
- Full name: André Louis Sellier
- Date of birth: 26 October 1890
- Place of birth: 16th arrondissement of Paris, France
- Date of death: 10 March 1920 (aged 29)
- Place of death: Houilles, France
- Position: Forward

Senior career*
Years	Team	Apps	(Gls)
1906–1910	Étoile des Deux Lacs		

International career
1910	France	1	(0)
- * Club domestic league appearances and goals

André Louis Sellier (26 October 1890 – 10 March 1920) was a French footballer who played as a forward for Étoile des Deux Lacs and the French national team between 1906 and 1910.

== Club career ==
Born in the 16th arrondissement of Paris on 26 October 1890, (Note: Some sources wrongly state that he was born in 1889.) Sellier played his entire football career in the patronage clubs, most notably at the Étoile des Deux Lacs between 1906 and 1911, one of the many Catholic clubs affiliated with the Gymnastic and Sports Federation of French Patronages (FGSPF), whose general secretary Charles Simon, was also the head of the Étoile club. He lived on rue de la Faisanderie, in the 16th arrondissement, barely 300 meters from the parish church of Saint Honoré d'Eylau, where the Étoile club was based. Sellier was playing in Étoile's second team as early as January 1906, only three months after his 15th birthday, a normal age for the amateur players in the patronages of that time; the local press stated that "the young Sellier put the ball in the net several times" to help his side to an 8–1 win over the second team of AS Bon Conseil.

Sellier was a member of the Étoile team that won the FGSPF Football Championship in 1907, and this victory allowed the club to compete in the inaugural edition of the Trophée de France in 1907, an inter-federation national competition organized by the CFI, which had just been founded by Simon. Together with Henri Mouton, Henri Bellocq, Maurice Olivier, and Jean Ducret, he was a member of the Étoile team that faced English Wanstead on 28 March 1910, scoring once in a 5–2 loss, and the English Wanderers in October 1910. In the day after Wanstead, on 29 March, he started for the CFI's Paris selection against the prestigious English club Bishop Auckland, winner of 3 FA amateur Cups, helping his side to an impressive 1–0 win.

== International career ==
These performances did not go unnoticed by the CFI, which pre-selected him as a substitute for a friendly against England amateurs on 16 April 1910, but he ended up not traveling to Brighton. In the following month, on 15 May, he earned his first (and only) international cap in a friendly against Italy in Milan, which ended in a 6–2 loss. At the time, there were no numbers or names printed on the jerseys, so identifying the players was often a problem, and thus, the Italian newspapers wrongly attributed France's first consolation goal to Sellier, when actually, it had been scored by his club teammate Bellocq; this was the very first goal conceded by the Italian national team.

In 1911, Sellier was replaced at Étoile by the younger Ernest Gravier and Jules Verbrugge, and he thus completely disappeared from the press with no further explanation since no one was interested in Sellier. Later that year, in October, he was incorporated into the military and assigned to the 29th artillery battalion of Laon for two years, which is located 130 km from Paris. A house painter and decorator, Sellier thus had a low income, so returning to Paris on leave to play football with Étoile was not an option, especially since the patronages were totally amateur, thus retiring from football.

== Later life ==
Shortly after being released from his military obligations, Sellier was mobilized by France at the outbreak of the First World War in August 1914, being assigned to the 40th Field Artillery Regiment. There, a fall from a horse on 1 September 1917, while on "commanded service", caused a skull fracture that left him with after-effects, such as deafness in one ear, dizziness, and headaches. He was kept in the auxiliary services following his accident as Secretary of Staff and then as a worker in aviation.

Sellier died in Houilles on 10 March 1920, at the age of just 29, most likely from the after-effects of his skull fracture.

== Legacy ==
Like many French internationals from the start of the 20th century, Sellier was the victim of mistakes by historians, being initially given the first name Henri in the 1972 federal directory, an error that persisted until the 21st century, even appearing in the Equipe de France de Football, l'Intégrale des 497 rencontres ("French Football Team, All 497 Matches"), a book published by the FFF in 1991. It was not until 2022 that the French football historian Pierre Cazal found the initial A as his first name on several occasions in the French press of the time, and thus, following a quick glance at the digitized military records of conscripts, André Sellier was found.

== Honours ==
Étoile des Deux Lacs

- FGSPF Football Championship: 1906–07
- Trophée de France: 1907
