= Auguste Tousset =

French footballer and aviator (1889–1937)

Personal information
- Date of birth: 23 December 1889
- Place of birth: 16th arrondissement of Paris, France
- Date of death: 18 March 1937 (aged 47)
- Place of death: 15th arrondissement of Paris, France
- Height: 1.72 m (5 ft 8 in)
- Position: Forward

Senior career*
Years	Team	Apps	(Gls)
1906–1914	Étoile des Deux Lacs		

International career
1910–1913	France	2	(1)
- * Club domestic league appearances and goals

Auguste Tousset (23 December 1889 – 18 March 1937) was a French footballer who played as a forward for Étoile des Deux Lacs and the French national team between 1906 and 1914. At club level, he was a six-time FGSPF champion (1905–07 and 1911–13).

== Early life ==
Born on 23 December 1889 in the 16th arrondissement of Paris, (Note: Some sources wrongly claim that he was born on 1 January 1888.) Tousset joined the patronage of his parish in 1897, aged only 8, where he developed football, being one of its first footballers of that patronage's team, Étoile des Deux Lacs. This team was one of the many Catholic clubs affiliated with the Gymnastic and Sports Federation of French Patronages (FGSPF), whose general secretary Charles Simon, was also the head of the Étoile club.

== Playing career ==
=== Club career ===
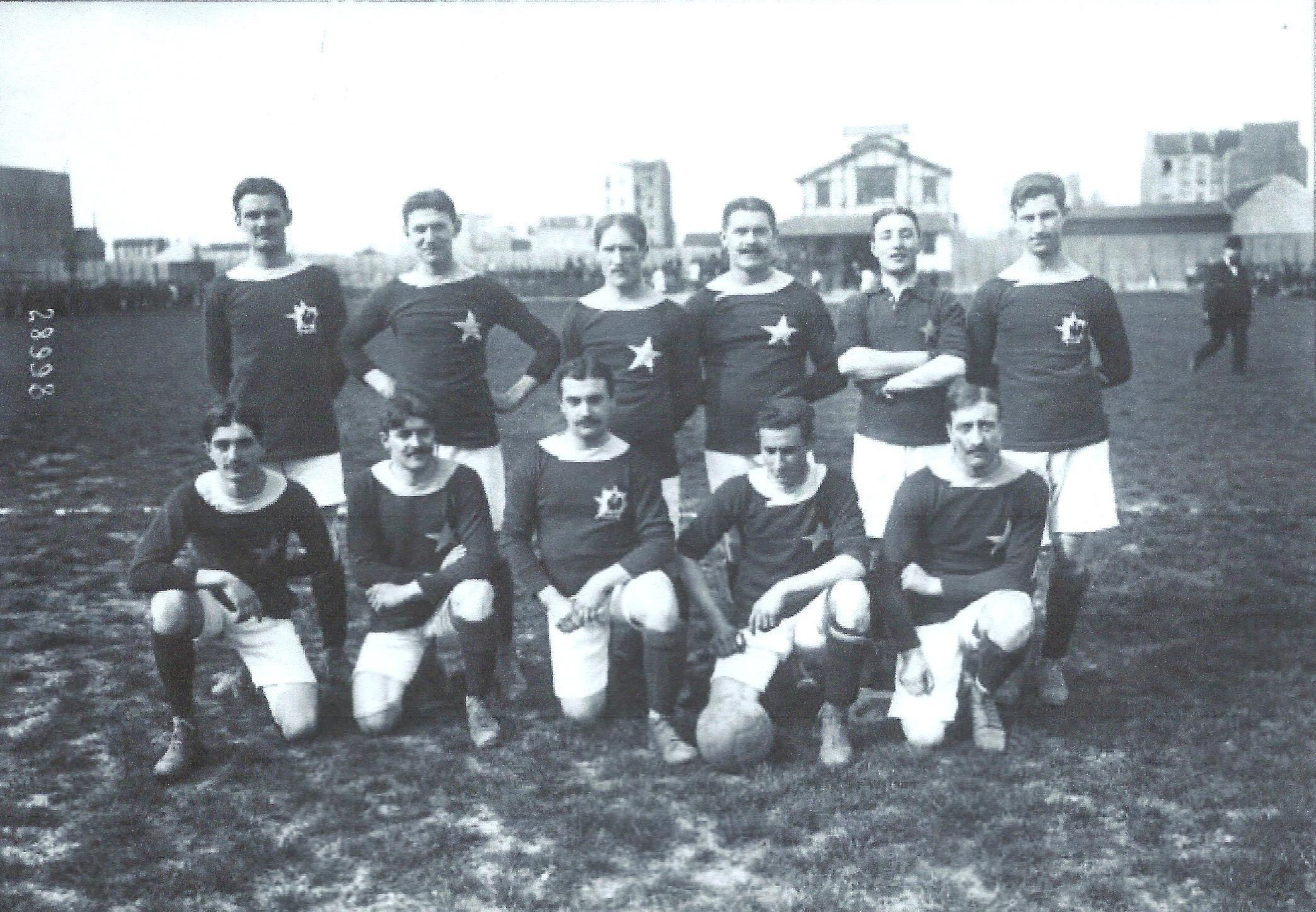
Tousset with Étoile des Deux Lacs in 1913.

Despite being messy and uncomfortable with the ball, measuring 1.72 meters and being rather skinny, Tousset was able to make up for his lack of talent through hard work and tenacity. Together with Henri Bellocq, Henri Mouton, Maurice Olivier, and Jean Ducret, Tousset was a member of the Étoile team that won six FGSPF Football Championships (1905–07 and 1911–13), and these victories allowed the club to compete in the inaugural edition of the Trophée de France in 1907, an inter-federation national competition organized by the CFI, which had just been founded by Simon. This tournament ended on 9 May 1907, when Étoile claimed a 8–3 victory over the Bordeaux-based FC Simiotin, winners of the Amateur Athletic Federation (FAA), thus becoming the first winner of a trophy that had been donated by Pierre de Coubertin himself.

On 2 June 1912, Tousset started in the final of the 1912 Trophée de France, helping his side to a 3–1 win over Jules Rimet's Red Star. In the following year, on 4 May, he started in the semifinals of the 1913 edition against CA Paris, in which he made a "good" performance in a 2–4 loss.

=== International career ===
On 16 April 1910, Tousset earned his first international cap for France in a friendly match against England amateurs at the Goldstone Ground, and even scoring his side's only goal in an eventual 1–10 loss; this was France's first goal against the English since 1906. He only started this match because of the absence of Joseph Delvecchio, but while some sources state that he was called up at the last-minute via telephone and immediately made himself available, others state that he just so happen to be at the railway station entirely by chance, thus travelling to Brighton completely unprepared.

Tousset had to wait three years until his next cap for France on 12 January 1913, another friendly, this time against Italy, helping his side to a 1–0 victory. Two months later, in March 1913, he was described by the local press as "courageous, precise, with a game as effective as it was natural".

== Later life ==
Outside football, Tousset was a carpenter in aeronautics, as well as a firefighter and balloonist in Versailles in 1911. During the First World War, he was associated with aviation, going on to become a caporal of the SPAD Escadrille, where he found great glory.

== Death ==
Tousset died in 15th arrondissement of Paris on 18 March 1937, at the age of 47, and was buried in Bagneux.

== Career statistics ==
France score listed first, score column indicates score after each Tousset goal.

List of international goals scored by Auguste Tousset
No.	Date	Venue	Opponent	Score	Result	Competition
1	16 April 1910	Goldstone Ground, Brighton, England	England Amateurs	1–10	1–10	Friendly match

== Honours ==
Étoile des Deux Lacs

- FGSPF Football Championship
  - Champions (6): 1904–05, 1905–06, 1906–07, 1911–12, and 1912–13
- Trophée de France:
  - Champion (2): 1907 and 1912
