= Pierre Cazal =

French literature professor, football historian, and author (1949–2024)

- Born: 1948; France
- Died: 7 October 2024 (aged 75); Château-Salins, Moselle, France
- Citizenship: Spanish
- Occupations: Literature professor; Football historian; Author
- Known for: Writer of l’Intégrale de l’équipe de France de football

Pierre Cazal (1948 – 7 October 2024) was a French literature professor and football historian who was widely regarded as one of the greatest contemporary connoisseurs of the history of the French national team.

Throughout his career, he wrote four books about the history of the Bleus, the first of which, published in 1992, covering the team's first 497 matches, and he later became the editor of the Chroniques bleues website, where he published weekly articles about the Bleus in the early 2020s, including the series Les premiers Bleus, a project about the Pre-WWI French internationals, in which he uncovered many previously unknown facts, corrected numerous long-time misconceptions, and debunked several mistakes that had persisted through time.

== Early life and education ==
Pierre Cazal was born in 1948. He was a graduate of the French Academy of Letters.

== Career ==
=== The 1992 and 1998 dictionaries ===
A retired literature professor, Cazal channeled his encyclopedic memory and insatiable curiosity into the history of the French national team. Therefore, in the early 1990s, Cazal, together with Jean-Michel Cazal and Michel Oreggia, were tasked by the French Football Federation (FFF) with "cleaning" the errors of their publications, especially its 1986–87 directory, a list of international players that had 11 false ones, while omitting 6 real ones, not to mention all the first name errors, some of which being "downright fanciful, as if someone had invented them". Unlike other countries, who possessed very comprehensive works of their national teams, France was lagging far behind statistically; for instance, a simple consultation of the official English reports of the 1908 Olympic Games was enough to correct all the errors of France's line-ups.

In the end, this work resulted in the publication of a book in 1992, l’Intégrale de l’équipe de France de football ("The Complete Collection of the French Football Team"), which not only covered the first 497 matches of the Blues, but also included the dictionary of its players, both in terms of first names and dates of birth or death. In 1998, just before the World Cup, Cazal published an extended and more complete version of this book, which had "a rich narrative that recounted the matches as if they had taken place yesterday", thus being considered by some as arguably the most in-depth work on the history of the French national team. Notably, he highlighted that seven of the goals scored by France between 1907 and 1913, came via the "goalkeeper charge", the action of jostling the goalkeeper to prevent him from having the ball, which was tolerated by the rules of the time, with striker Eugène Maës making it one of his specialties.

At the time, the Internet as we know it today did not yet exist, so this research had to be carried out by consulting newspaper archives in libraries, making dozens of phone calls, and writing to correspondents abroad. This long and laborious process inevitably led to some mistakes, such as wrong first names, which were kept because the policy of the time stated that "if the error was not proven, the previous indications would be retained". In the early 1990s, all former international players from the pre-WWI period were deceased, along with most of their descendants, so it was not until the digitization of civil and military records, old sports newspapers, and the appearance of Gallica and genealogy sites, that allowed Cazal to carry out more thorough investigation, thus proving these first name errors and finally find out their real names, such as André Sellier, Simon Sollier, Raymond Jouve, and Gaston Brébion, who had been erroneously named Henri, André, Albert, and Gilbert, respectively. Another such example is that of François Barat, erroneously named Jean-Marie Barat, which he was only able to find thanks to a clue from an old testimony that was given to him by the ex-president of the AS Bon Conseil.

Cazal eventually acknowledged his good faith mistakes in the 1992 and 1998 dictionaries during his series Les premiers Bleus ("the first Bleus"), a project that consisted of biographical articles about the forgotten Pre-WWI French internationals, which were written by him and then published in the Chroniques bleues website from January 2023 until his death in October 2024. On one occasion, he stated that this series "gave me the opportunity, in addition to making my mea culpa, to establish the definitive, most reliable civil status possible for as many former international players as possible". In a 2019 interview, he also stated that "I personally know much more about all the international players before 1940 than what can be found on Wikipedia or other much poorer sites".

=== Chroniques bleues ===
His 1998 dictionary served as the basis for the creation of the Chroniques bleues website in August 2010 by Bruno Colombari, with whom Cazal exchanged over 4,000 email messages between February 2019 and his death in October 2024. During those five years, Cazal wrote a total of 140 articles for Chroniques bleues, including the aforementioned series Les premiers Bleus, the last of which being about André Poullain (1913). He published these biographies with a maximum rate of one article per week, so in order to reach 1980, he would have to write a total of 640 bios, the equivalent of 13 years.

His work, together with that of Matthieu Delahais, Raphaël Perry, and Richard Coudrais, played a crucial role in giving Chroniques bleues a historical depth far beyond Colombari's initial project of 2010. For instance, in September 2020, he published an article about the youngest player in France's history, in which he proved that the holder of this record was not Jules Verbrugge, who had been widely believed to be such for years, but instead is Félix Vial.

=== Writing career ===
In the early 2020s, Cazal wrote three books about the French national team, Sélectionneurs des Bleus in 2020, L’épopée des Bleus à l’Euro ("The Epic of the Blues at the Euro") in 2021, and Une histoire tactique des Bleus ("A Tactical History of the Blues"), published in September 2022. He also worked with the Franco-Uruguayan historian Pierre Arrighi on two books about Jules Rimet and the 1924 Olympic Games in Paris, both published in Spanish.

== Death ==
Cazal died in the Moselle commune of Château-Salins, on 7 October 2024, at the age of 75. Following his death, Colombari highlighted his kindness and self-sacrifice, as well as his "less visible work of advice, corrections, clarifications which irrigates a large part of the editorial content of the site and the database which feeds it".
