= Abel Lafouge =

French footballer (1895–1950)

Personal information
- Full name: Louis Alexandre Abel Lafouge
- Date of birth: 10 April 1895
- Place of birth: Fresse, France
- Date of death: 20 March 1950 (aged 54)
- Place of death: 12th arrondissement of Paris, France
- Position: Right winger

Senior career*
Years	Team	Apps	(Gls)
1912–1914	Championnet Sports		
1919	Championnet Sports		
- Stade Olympique de l'Est

International career
1911	France	1	(0)
- * Club domestic league appearances and goals

Louis Alexandre Abel Lafouge (10 April 1895 – 20 March 1950) was a French footballer who played as a right winger for Championnet Sports and the French national team in the early 1910s.

== Early life ==
Abel Lafouge was born on 10 April 1895 in the Haute-Saône town of Fresse, as the son of a farmer who became a police officer in Paris.

== Playing career ==
Lafouge began his football career in 1912, aged 17, in a very modest team Championnet Sports, a Parisian patronage founded in 1907 by Abbé Bernard. The following year, on 12 January 1913, he earned his first and last international cap for France against Italy, being called-up as a last-minute replacement for Fernand Faroux. In doing so at the age of 17 years and 9 months, he became the fourth youngest player in France's history at the time, only behind fellow 17-year-olds Daniel Mercier (1910), Henri Moigneu (1909), and Félix Vial (1911).

Due to his young age coupled with his lack of experience in playing high-level matches, it is to be assumed that Lafouge was nervous, and likewise, even though France won 1–0, his performance was unanimously criticized by the local press, with the journalists of the French newspaper L'Auto (currently known as L'Équipe) stating that he "missed a few good passes" in the first half and "continued to miss the passes that come to him" in the second half, and blamed the low-scoring result on Lafouge and Ferdinand Rochet, who "disoriented France's attack". Notably, the northerner Maurice Wuillaume of the Vie sportive du Nord-Pas de Calais mocked the wingers, stating that "as soon as the ball reached them, they send it into touch to enrage their teammates and the public", while another journalist stated that he "showed good dispositions, but his preliminary work was very poorly finished". After such humiliation from the press, neither of them were ever called up again.

== Later life ==
An employee of the Bank of France, Lafouge was mobilized at the outbreak of World War I in July 1914, becoming a corporal in the 90th Infantry Regiment, and later a prisoner in Giessen from May 1916 to January 1919.

Only nine days after his release, Lafouge returned to the football pitch, initially for Championnet Sports, but following the creation of the French Football Federation (FFF) in 1919, he moved to Stade Olympique de l'Est, where he played alongside his brother Gaston, and where he retired in the early 1920s. He later became head of department at the Bank of France, which earned him a special assignment in 1940.

== Death ==
Lafouge died in 12th arrondissement of Paris on 20 March 1950, at the age of 54.

== Bibliography ==
- Perry, Raphaël (2021). Bleus éphémères [Ephemeral blues] (in French). Paris: Hugo Sport. p. 41. ISBN 978-2-7556-9244-0.
