= Gaston Brébion =

French footballer (1887–1970)

Personal information
- Full name: Gaston Louis Brébion
- Date of birth: 20 March 1887
- Place of birth: 16th arrondissement of Paris, France
- Date of death: 21 September 1970 (aged 83)
- Place of death: La Garde, Var, France
- Position: Forward

Senior career*
Years	Team	Apps	(Gls)
1906–1910	Étoile des Deux Lacs		

International career
1909	France	1	(0)
- * Club domestic league appearances and goals

Gaston Louis Brébion (20 March 1887 – 21 September 1970) was a French footballer who played as a forward for Étoile des Deux Lacs and the France national team between 1906 and 1910.

== Early life ==
Gaston Brébion was born on 20 March 1887, (Note: Some sources wrongly state that he was born in 1885.) in the 16th arrondissement of Paris, barely 300 meters from the parish church of Saint-Honoré d'Eylau, where the Étoile des Deux Lacs was based. The Étoile club was one of the many Catholic clubs affiliated with the Gymnastic and Sports Federation of French Patronages (FGSPF), whose general secretary Charles Simon, was also the head of the Étoile club.

== Club career ==
Together with Henri Bellocq, Henri Mouton, and Jules Verbrugge, Brébion was a member of the Étoile team that was proclaimed champion of the patronages in 1904, and as such, the club then faced the champions of Paris, United SC on 1 May 1904, which ended in a 5–1 loss. In the following year, in April 1905, the local press stated that "Brébion, 18 years old, comes from the second team where he occupied the left back position; with the habit of playing as right back, he will become a very good player".

In January 1906, the FGSPF organized a sort of ultra-trail (running, throwing, jumping, cycling, climbing, and fencing) in which Brébion totaled 100 points, meaning that he was a complete all-round athlete. Just like most players of the patronages, he often played with his head, and despite being a defender, he was quite offensive, taking corners, and even shooting at goal, being thus sometimes criticized for "having the fault of dribbling too far from his goal".

Brébion helped Étoile win a three-peat of FGSPF Football Championships (1905–07), which qualified the club for the inaugural edition of the Trophée de France in 1907, an inter-federation national competition organized by the CFI, which had just been founded by Simon. This tournament ended on 9 May 1907, when Étoile claimed a 8–3 victory over the Bordeaux-based FC Simiotin, winners of the Amateur Athletic Federation (FAA), thus becoming the first winner of a trophy that had been donated by Pierre de Coubertin himself.

== International career ==
Despite winning multiple titles with Étoile in 1905–07, Brébion was not called up for the French national team because the national coach of the time, the northerner André Billy of USFSA, preferred players from the Nord. When the USFSA was replaced by Simon's CFI, however, he was immediately called up for the first two matches of the CFI reign, both in May 1909, in friendly matches against Belgium in Brussels and England amateurs in Gentilly, but at the time, he was still carrying out his mandatory military service, and accumulating two leaves within a fortnight was not an option, especially since the French army only had an agreement with the USFSA, and not with the CFI, so he ended up not traveling to Brussels, being replaced by Ernest Tossier.

On 22 May 1909, the 22-year-old Brébion earned his first (and only) international cap against England amateurs, which ended in an 11–0 loss. Brébion and Simon Sollier, the two fullbacks of France, were blamed for this humiliating result by the local press, who stated that they were the team's weak point, "especially in the first half, where they committed serious mistakes and even managed two own goals"; the English sources of this match do not mention any own goal, but since at least two goals are attributed to Harry Stapley with a header, it is possible that one of them was the work of Brébion, still under the charge.

It was perhaps because of this catastrophic performance that marked a turning point to a trajectory that had been upward until then, as he then suddenly disappeared from the Étoile line-ups after 1910, and his place was taken by Félix Romano.

== Later life and death ==
Brébion was mobilized at the outbreak of World War I, but was discharged in 1915 because of rheumatic endocarditis and cardiac hypertrophy, so he was assigned to a squadron of the quartermaster corps in 1917.

After the War, he settled in Montpellier; he never returned to Paris, dying in La Garde, Var on 21 September 1970, at the age of 83.

== Legacy ==
Just like many French internationals from the start of the 20th century, Brébion was the victim of mistakes by historians, being initially given the first name of Gilbert, which was actually his younger brother, who also played at Étoile, making his debut in the first team in 1913, but he was born only in 1896, and thus only 13 years old during Brébion's international debut in 1909.

== Honours ==
Étoile des Deux Lacs

- FGSPF Football Championship: 1904–05, 1905–06, 1906–07
- Trophée de France: 1907
