= Lafouge =

Lafouge is a French surname. Notable people with the surname include:

- Abel Lafouge (1895–1950), French footballer
- Jean-Pierre LaFouge (1952–2022), French professor
- Stephan Lafouge (born 1970), French show jumping rider
