= Étoile des Deux Lacs =

Football club in France

Étoile des deux lacs
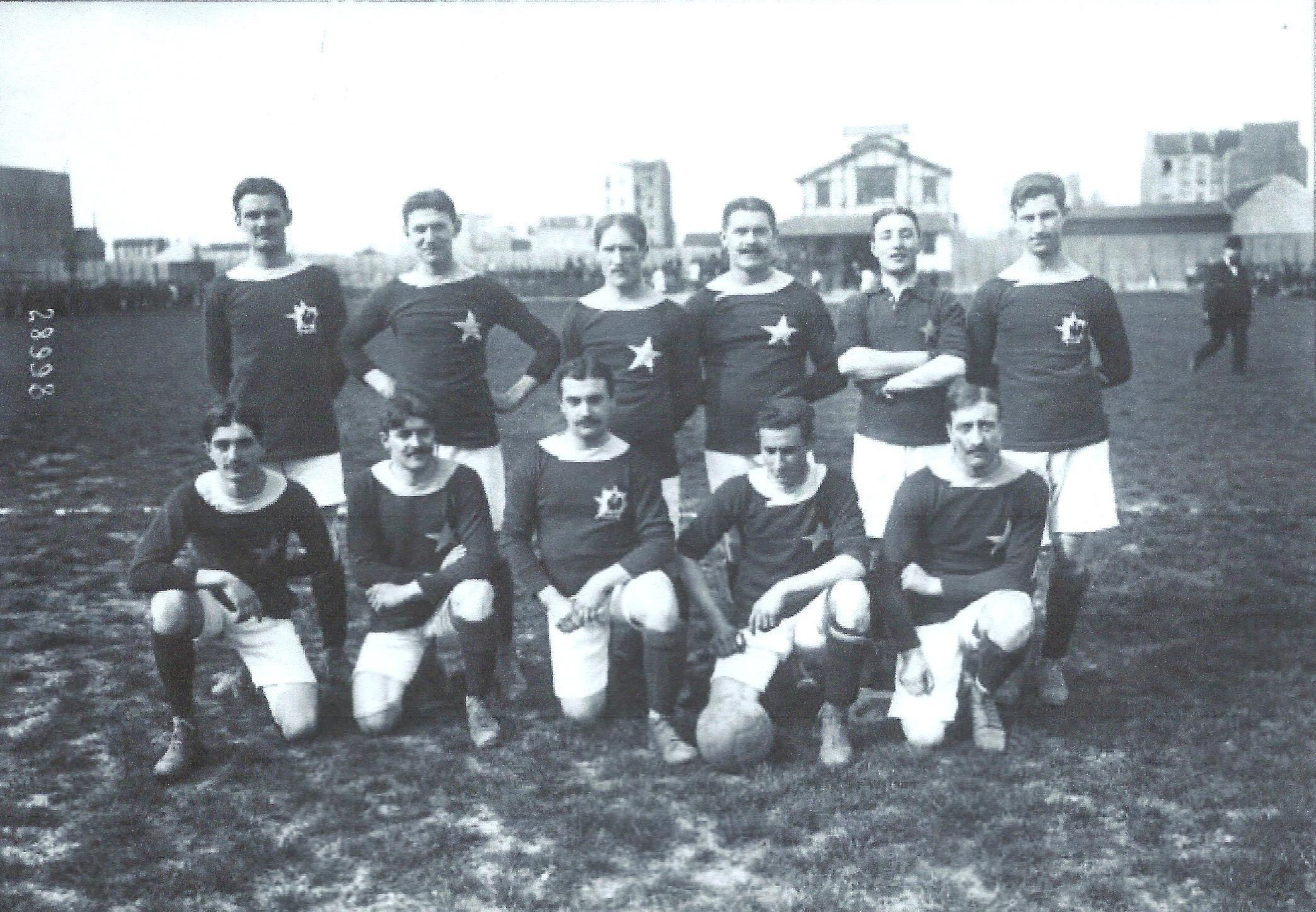
- The Étoile team in 1913
- Founded: 1898
- Dissolved: Before the 1950s
- Ground: Stade Châtenay-Malabry
- League: FGSPF Football Championship

The Étoile des deux lacs (English: Star of the two lakes) was a football club founded in 1898, and located in Paris, France. It was one of the most important clubs in France in the early 20th century, winning six FGSPF Football Championship and six Trophée de France in 1905–07 and 1911–13.

== History ==
=== Early success ===
Étoile des deux lacs (EDL) was founded in 1898, by Father Abbé Biron, as the football team of the parish of Saint-Honoré d'Eylau in the 16th arrondissement of Paris. The EDL, which wore a garnet jersey with a blue star, played on the pitch in La Muette, located near the two lakes of the Bois de Boulogne, hence the club's name. Among its first players, Charles Simon and Henri Delaunay stands out, who fell in love with the sport after watching some of the team's matches.

Simon eventually replaced Father Biron as the president of EDL because, in February 1903, he already was the representative of Étoile in the USFSA's football commission. The EDL eventually became one of the many Catholic clubs affiliated with the Gymnastic and Sports Federation of French Patronages (FGSPF), being proclaimed champions of the patronages in 1904, and as such, the club then faced the champions of Paris, United SC on 1 May 1904, which ended in a 5–1 loss. While Simon ruled the team off the field, Henri Bellocq ruled it inside, with his authoritarian personality making him the club's captain in a time when such a position was elected by his teammates, and not designated by a manager. He even served as the club's secretary, having an office at rue Thomas d'Aquin, the address of the headquarters of FGSPF, from which he published several advertisements in the French newspaper L'Auto (the predecessor of L'Équipe), where he requested, for instance, friendly matches.

In January 1906, the FGSPF organized a sort of ultra-trail in which one of EDL's members Gaston Brébion totaled 100 points, meaning that he was a complete all-round athlete.

=== Golden age ===
As the president of EDL, the very active Simon quickly climbed the ranks within the FGSPF, eventually becoming its secretary general. During his stint as the Secretary General of the FGSPF, Simon inaugurated the FGSPF Football Championship, whose inaugural edition was won by the club that he chaired (EDL) in April 1905, a feat that was repeated five more times for a total of two three-peats (1905–07 and 1911–13), beating Cadets de Bretagne in both the 1906 and 1907 finals, and Patronages du Bordelais in the 1912 and 1913 finals. In 1907, Simon's CFI organized its inaugural championship, the so-called Trophée de France, which pits the champions of each federation that makes up the CFI against each other at the end of the season, and its inaugural edition in 1907 was won by EDL, the champions of the FGSPF, after claiming an 8–3 victory over the Bordeaux-based FC Simiotin, winners of the Amateur Athletic Federation (FAA), and their reward was a trophy that had been donated by Pierre de Coubertin.

As the champions of the FGSPF in 1911–13, the EDL competed in those three editions of the Trophée de France, losing the 1911 final to CA Paris (0–1), but then claiming the 1912 edition after beating Jules Rimet's Red Star 3–1 in the final, courtesy of goals from Félix Romano (2) and Jean Ducret. In the following edition, EDL was kncoked-out in the semifinals by CA Paris (2–4).

=== Later years ===
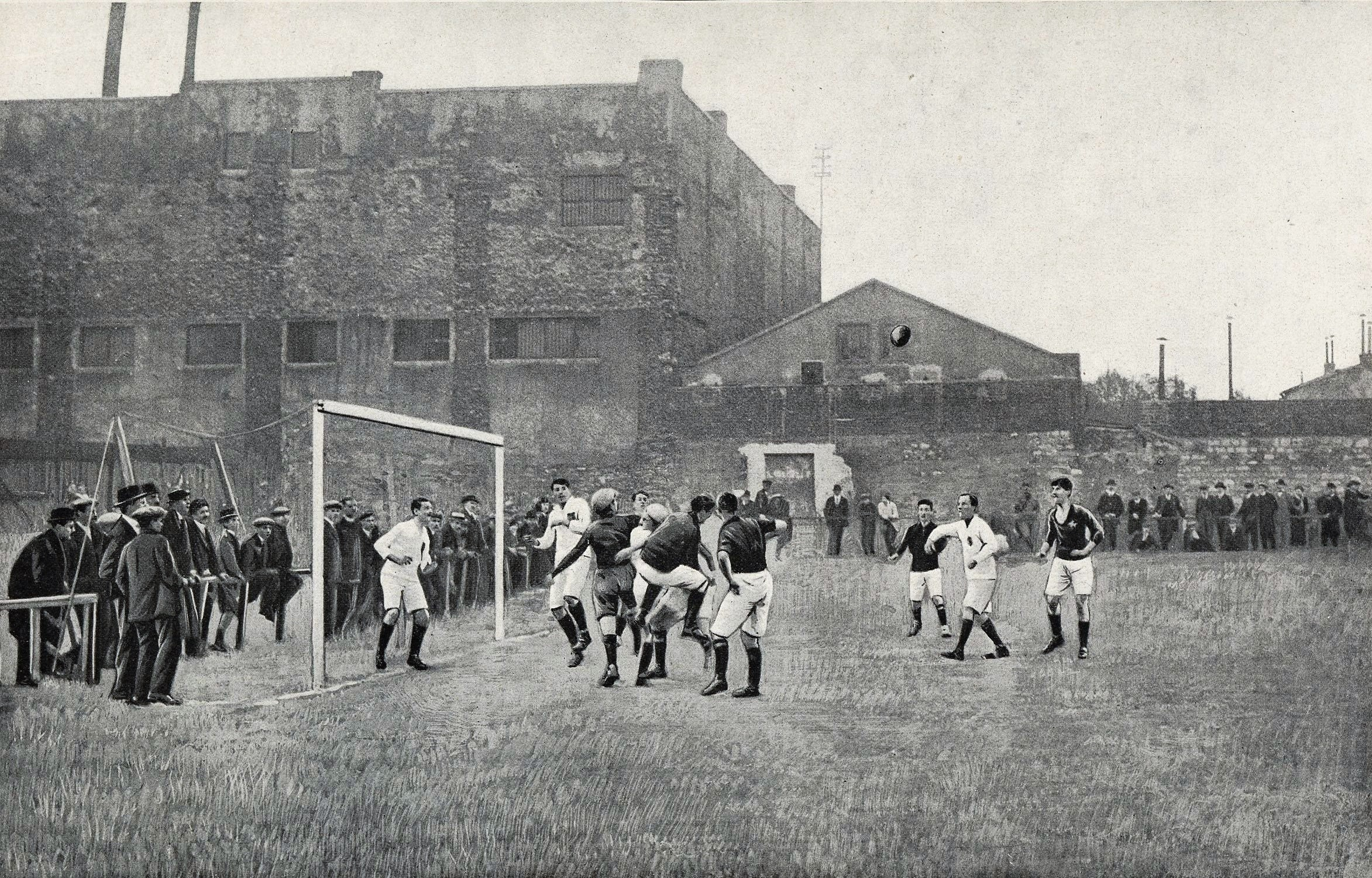
Photo of the final between Étoile des Deux Lacs (dark) and Olympique (light).

During the First World War, the Union des Sociétés Françaises de Sports Athlétiques (USFSA) replaced its USFSA Football Championship with the so-called USFSA National Cup, with the EDL winning the 1915–16 edition. The Trophée de France and the FGSPF Football Championship, which had lasted for ten seasons, were interrupted by the outbreak of the War, but in 1916, the CFI relaunched an interfederal tournament on the same model as the Trophée de France, but simply renamed Coupe de France, in which EDL lost the final 3–0 to Olympique de Pantin. This tournament did not last, however, and was replaced by the 1917–18 Charles Simon Cup, created by the CFI on the initiative of its new secretary general Henri Delaunay, which was named after Simon as a means to honor his memory. EDL was one of the 48 clubs that participated in the inaugural Coupe de France, making its debut on 4 November 1917, which ended in a 2–1 over Gallia Club, but was then knocked out in the round of 16 by AS Française (8–1).

The date of its dissolution is undetermined, but probably before the 1950s.

== Notable players ==
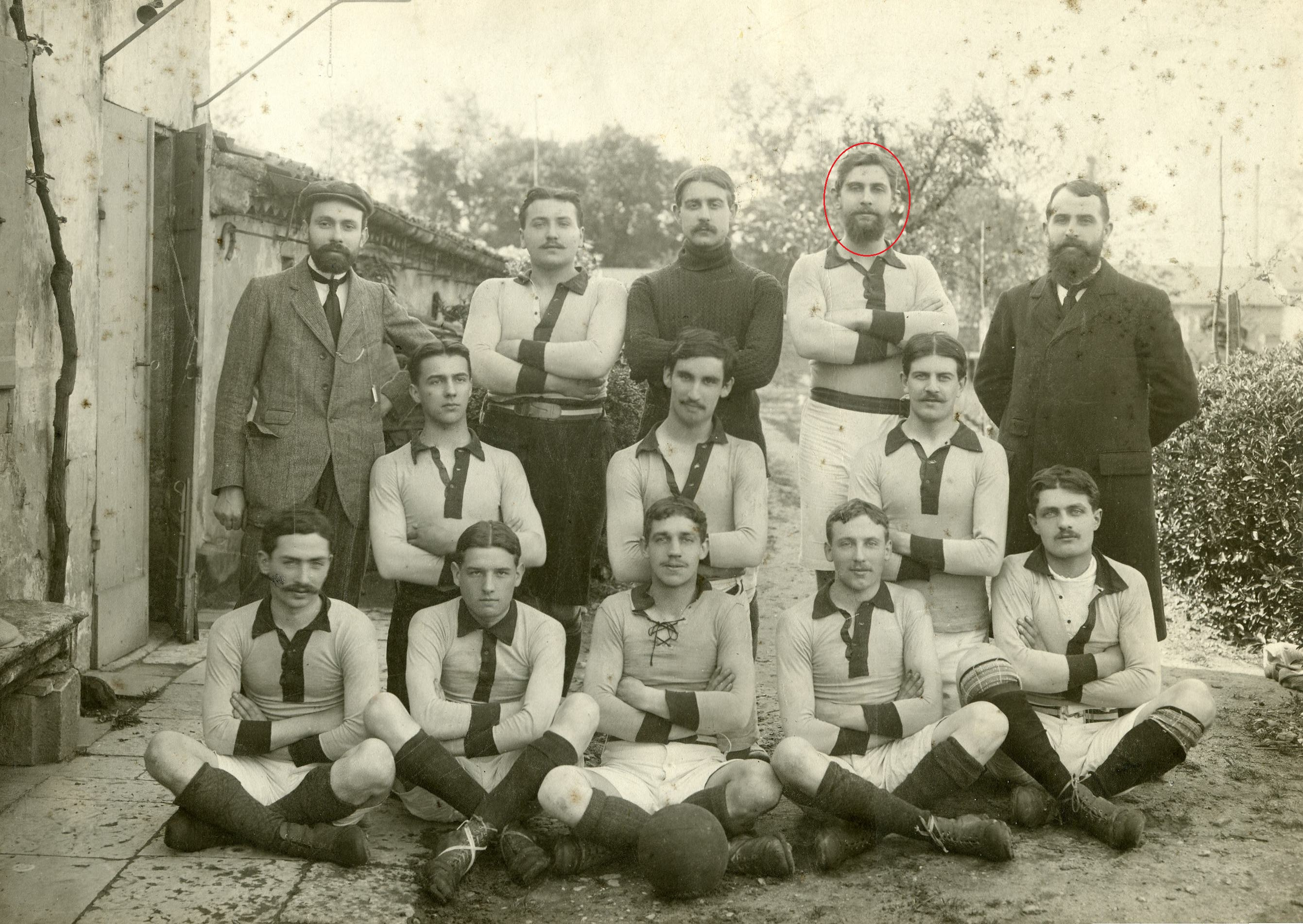
The Olier Patronage team around 1910.

In the early 1910s, the club had several of its footballers playing in the French team, such as Jean Ducret (1910–13), Henri Bellocq (1909–11), Maurice Olivier (1910–14), Henri Mouton (1909–10), Daniel Mercier (1909–10), Paul Romano (1911–12), Auguste Tousset (1910–13), Maurice Meunier (1909), Gaston Brébion (1909), André Sellier (1910), and Félix Romano (1913), and some of them even set up to represent France at the 1912 Olympic Games in Stockholm, such as Ducret, Olivier, and Paul Romano.

== Honours ==
- FGSPF Football Championship
  - Champions (6): 1905–07 and 1911–13
- Trophée de France
  - Champions (2): 1907 and 1912
  - Runner-up (1): 1911
- USFSA National Cup
  - Champions (1): 1915–16
- Coupe de France
  - Runner-up (1): 1916
