= Henri Bellocq =

French footballer

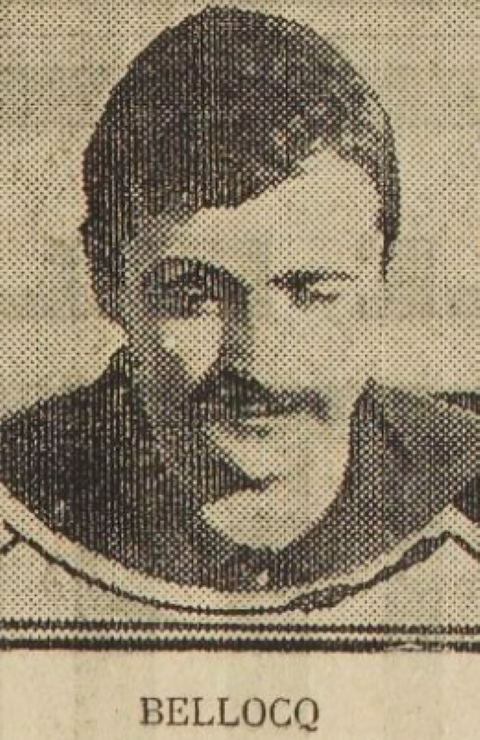
- Bellocq in 1913

Personal information
- Full name: Gaston Henri Bellocq
- Date of birth: 16 December 1884
- Place of birth: Bordeaux, France
- Date of death: 5 September 1959 (aged 74)
- Place of death: 12th arrondissement of Paris, France
- Height: 1.60 m (5 ft 3 in)
- Position: Midfielder

Senior career*
Years	Team	Apps	(Gls)
1902–1914	Étoile des Deux Lacs		

International career
1908–1911	France	6	(1)
- * Club domestic league appearances and goals

Gaston Henri Bellocq (16 December 1884 – 5 September 1959) (Note: Some sources wrongly claim that he was born in 1888 and died during the First World War in 1914.) was a French footballer who played as a midfielder for Étoile des Deux Lacs and the French national team between 1904 and 1914. At club level, he was a six-time FGSPF champion (1905–07 and 1911–13), always as captain, and even was secretary of Étoile.

== Early life ==
Bellocq was born in Bordeaux on 16 December 1884, as the son of a shirtmaker who died in Paris in 1896. As the only son of a widow, his military service lasted only one year (1905–06); later, he completed two periods of exercises, in 1908 and 1912.

The young Gaston Henri, always called only Henri in the newspapers, was registered with the patronage of his parish in the 16th arrondissement of Paris and developed a real cult for football, joining the first team of Étoile des Deux Lacs in 1902, aged 18, and never leaving it until 1914. This team was one of the many Catholic clubs affiliated with the Gymnastic and Sports Federation of French Patronages (FGSPF), whose general secretary Charles Simon, was also the head of the Étoile club.

== Playing career ==
=== Club career ===
Despite being slow, Bellocq imposed himself in Étoile's attack line thanks to his sense of the game, scientific pass, and positioning, which made him an opportunistic scorer. Despite being small in size (1.60m), Bellocq was authoritarian and knew how to command, becoming the club's captain in a time when such a position was elected by his teammates, and not designated by a manager. He even served as the club's secretary, having an office at rue Thomas d'Aquin, the address of the headquarters of FGSPF, from which he published several advertisements in L'Auto (the predecessor of L'Équipe), where he requested, for instance, friendly matches. On 18 July 1914, Bellocq was even part of the Central Committee of the FGSPF.

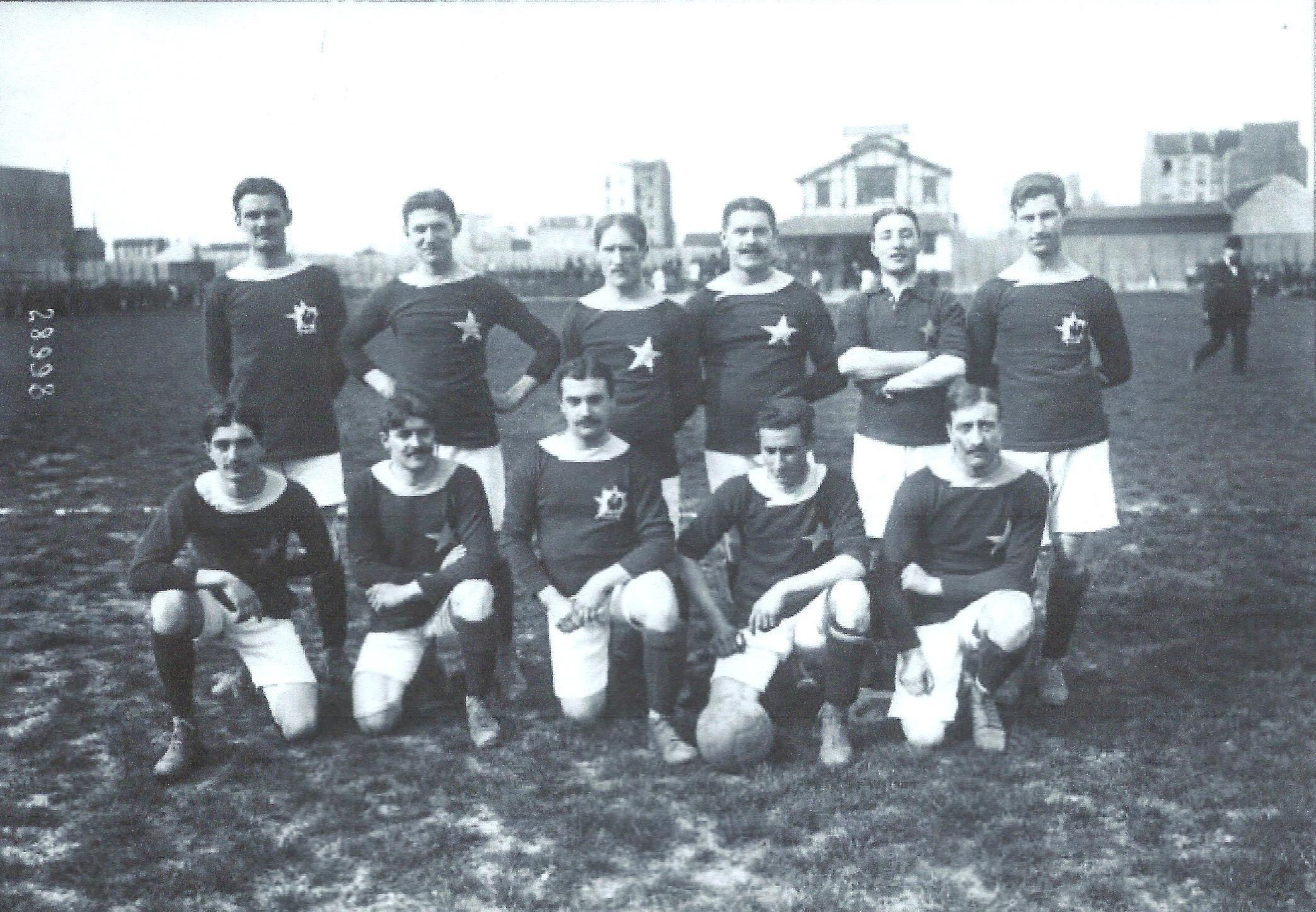
Bellocq with Étoile des Deux Lacs in 1913.

Together with Auguste Tousset, Henri Mouton, Maurice Olivier, and Jean Ducret, Bellocq was a member of the Étoile team that won six FGSPF Football Championships (1905–07 and 1911–13), and these victories allowed the club to compete in the inaugural edition of the Trophée de France in 1907, an inter-federation national competition organized by the CFI, which had just been founded by Simon. This tournament ended on 9 May 1907, when Étoile claimed a 8–3 victory over the Bordeaux-based FC Simiotin, winners of the Amateur Athletic Federation (FAA), thus becoming the first winner of a trophy that had been donated by Pierre de Coubertin himself.

On 11 June 1911, Bellocq started in the final of the 1911 Trophée de France, which ended in a loss to CA Paris. In the final of the following edition, this time against Jules Rimet's Red Star, Bellocq was set to start the match as the captain, but ultimately did not; despite his absence, however, Étoile's forward line had an excellent first half and won the final by the score of 3–1. In the following year, on 4 May, he started in the semifinals of the 1913 edition against CA Paris, scoring the opening goal with an "unstoppable shot", but then conceding a penalty converted by Louis Mesnier in an eventual 2–4 loss.

=== International career ===
On 20 January 1907, Bellocq was the captain of a FGSPF team made up of players from the patronages in a friendly against the English club North London AFC, helping his side to a 4–2 win. Despite captaining his club to multiple titles in 1905–07, he was not called up for the French national team because the national coach of the time, the northerner André Billy of USFSA, preferred players from the Nord. When the USFSA was replaced by Simon's CFI, however, Bellocq became an undisputed starter, playing in the first six matches of the CFI reign, from 1909 until January 1911, all of which ending in losses. His first two matches for France were very similar: Both games were friendlies in 1909, against Belgium and England amateurs, and on both occasions, he was the captain and led his side to defeat.

In his fifth caps on 15 May 1910, a friendly against Italy in Milan, Bellocq scored once in a 2–6 loss; the Italian newspapers wrongly attributed this goal to his club teammate André Sellier. This was the very first goal conceded by the Italian national team. He could have had 3 more selections, but forfeited the matches of March and April 1911, which allowed Louis Mesnier, an international under the governance of the USFSA, to make his return to the French team. Bellocq therefore disappeared silently from the national team, probably because of his lack of athletic potential.

== Personal and later life ==
In November 1911, Bellocq married Marie-Marguerite Albrecht in Saverne, which has been a German city since the annexation of Alsace–Lorraine in 1871. Since that region belonged to the German Empire, Bellocq had to require a passport and visa to cross the Franco-German border in order to get married in Saverne, before returning to France. Following the assassination of Archduke Franz Ferdinand on 28 June 1914, rumors of war began growing, so Bellocq, foreseeing war, decided to take his wife to Saverne, rather than leaving her alone in Paris.

Bellocq, a responsible captain and a Catholic leader with values and moral principles, most likely tried to return to France, but failed to do so because the border was closed (France had to close the borders following Germany's mobilization). Therefore, during the general mobilization at the outbreak of the First World War, Bellocq did not join his unit (the 106th Infantry Regiment), so he was declared insubordinate in April 1915, before receiving a statute of limitations in December 1937, which means that he did not fight in the War, not for a minute. Usually, deserters are caught and arrested by the gendarmerie, but Bellocq was never located because he was stuck in German Alsace. It is unknown exactly what happened, but as a French citizen, Bellocq was likely arrested by the Germans and interned, and the Albrecht family were probably worried themselves, for the sole reason that they were sheltering a French son-in-law, which was enough to make them suspected of being Francophilic.

The amnesty of 1920, for all acts of insubordination, allowed Bellocq to return to France without any risk, but he maintained close relations with his in-laws; for instance, in 1948, Christian Albrecht, his father-in-law, transferred his shares in a Parisian business located on rue du Repos to Bellocq and Marie-Marguerite.

== Death ==
Bellocq died in 12th arrondissement of Paris on 5 September 1959, at the age of 74.

== Career statistics ==
France score listed first, score column indicates score after each Bellocq goal.

List of international goals scored by Henri Bellocq
No.	Date	Venue	Opponent	Score	Result	Competition
1	15 May 1910	Arena Civica, Milan, Italy	Italy	1–2	2–6	Friendly match

== Honours ==
Étoile des Deux Lacs

- FGSPF Football Championship
  - Champions (6): 1904–05, 1905–06, 1906–07, 1910–11, 1911–12, and 1912–13
- Trophée de France:
  - Champion (2): 1907 and 1912
  - Runner-up (2): 1911
