= Brébion =

Brébion is a French surname. Notable people with the surname include:

- Gaston Brébion (1887–1970), French footballer
- Maximilien Brébion (1716–1797), French architect
- Paula Brébion (1861–1952), French singer and actress
