= Henri Mouton (footballer) =

French footballer (1881–1962)

Personal information
- Full name: Henri Léon Mouton
- Date of birth: 20 April 1881
- Place of birth: Morsain, Aisne, France
- Date of death: 10 March 1962 (aged 80)
- Place of death: Savigny-sur-Orge, France
- Height: 1.71 m (5 ft 7 in)
- Position: Forward

Senior career*
Years	Team	Apps	(Gls)
1907–1911	Étoile des Deux Lacs		
1912	Gallia de Soissons		

International career
1909–1910	France	5	(1)
- * Club domestic league appearances and goals

Henri Léon Mouton (20 April 1881 – 10 March 1962) was a French footballer who played as a forward for Étoile des Deux Lacs and the French national team between 1907 and 1911.

== Playing career ==
=== Club career ===
Born in Morsain, Hauts-de-France, on 20 April 1881, Mouton played his entire football career in the patronage clubs, most notably at the Étoile des Deux Lacs between 1907 and 1911, one of the many Catholic clubs affiliated with the Gymnastic and Sports Federation of French Patronages (FGSPF), whose general secretary Charles Simon, was also the head of the Étoile club. Mouton's qualities were his height of 1.71 meters tall, being stocky, energetic, passionate, and a "loudmouth", which was normal at the patronages, where there is no academic game and football was played in a hasty manner. He also has a good head game, which at the time was quite rare, especially in attack, and he never hesitated to take the ball with his head in a time where many were reluctant to do so, since the leather balls of those times were heavier. Like all the players of the patronages, Mouton practiced athletics, and he distinguished himself in the long jump as well as in the shot put, which meant that he had strength and energy to spare.

Together with Auguste Tousset, Henri Bellocq, Maurice Olivier, and Jean Ducret, Mouton was a member of the Étoile team that won the FGSPF Football Championship in 1907 and 1911, and these victories allowed the club to compete in the inaugural edition of the Trophée de France in 1907, an inter-federation national competition organized by the CFI, which had just been founded by Simon. In the final of this tournament on 9 May 1907, Mouton scored at least one goal to help Étoile claim an 8–3 victory over the Bordeaux-based FC Simiotin, winners of the Amateur Athletic Federation (FAA), thus becoming the first winner of a trophy that had been donated by Pierre de Coubertin himself. On 11 June 1911, Mouton started in the final of the 1911 Trophée de France, which ended in a loss to CA Paris.

=== International career ===
On 20 January 1907, Mouton played for a FGSPF team made up of players from the patronages in a friendly against the English club North London AFC, helping his side to a 4–2 win. Despite winning multiple titles with Étoile in 1907, he was not called up for the French national team because the national coach of the time, the northerner André Billy of USFSA, preferred players from the Nord. He was such an unpreferred player, that the USFSA only selected him as a member of the would-be France C squad, which was originally listed to compete in the football tournament of the 1908 Olympic Games, but Mouton ended up not traveling to London because the USFSA decided to send only two instead of three teams.

It was only when the USFSA was replaced by Simon's CFI that Mouton finally became an undisputed starter, playing in the first five matches of the CFI reign, from 1909 until May 1910, all of which ending in losses. He only scored once, on his debut, in a friendly against Belgium, doing so from a header, on a cross from Maurice Meunier. His replacement was the great Eugène Maës.

== Later life ==
In October 1911, Mouton returned to his native lands, in the Aisne, where he had married a "countrywoman" in 1909, and where he played in the Gallia de Soissons team. In 1927, after the First World War, he returned to the Paris region to see his son play at the Patronage Olier.

He settled in Savigny-sur-Orge, where he died on 10 March 1962, at the age of 80.

== Career statistics ==
France score listed first, score column indicates score after each Mouton goal.

List of international goals scored by Henri Mouton
No.	Date	Venue	Opponent	Score	Result	Competition
1	9 May 1909	Stade du Vivier d'Oie, Brussels, Belgium	Belgium	1–2	2–5	Friendly match

== Honours ==
Étoile des Deux Lacs

- FGSPF Football Championship
  - Champions (6): 1906–07, 1910–11
- Trophée de France:
  - Champion (1): 1907
  - Runner-up (1): 1911
