= Maurice Meunier =

French footballer (1890–1971)

Personal information
- Full name: Maurice Eugène Meunier
- Date of birth: 27 January 1890
- Place of birth: 18th arrondissement of Paris, France
- Date of death: 27 February 1971 (aged 81)
- Place of death: Courbevoie, France
- Position: Forward

Senior career*
Years	Team	Apps	(Gls)
1908–1910	Étoile des Deux Lacs		
1910–1914	CASG Paris		
1918–1919	FC Lyon		

International career
1909	France	1	(0)
- * Club domestic league appearances and goals

Maurice Eugène Meunier (27 January 1890 – 27 February 1971) was a French footballer who played as a forward for Étoile des Deux Lacs and the France national team in the early 20th century.

== Playing career ==
Born in the 18th arrondissement of Paris on 27 January 1890, Meunier was seventeen when he joined the ranks of his nearby club Étoile des Deux Lacs in 1907, one of the many Catholic clubs affiliated with the Gymnastic and Sports Federation of French Patronages (FGSPF), whose general secretary Charles Simon, was also the head of the Étoile club. At EDL, he practiced several sports, especially athletics, specialising in the 110-metre hurdles event, in which he established a FGSPF record of 18,4 seconds, which stood for over two decades. He joined the club's football team in the 1908–09 season, where he played on the right wing, only so he could stay fit during the winter.

On 14 March 1909, Meunier scored a goal to help his side to a 3–2 victory over Union Saint-Gilloise, which earned his first (and only) international cap for France in a friendly against these same Belgians in Brussels on 9 May 1909. Despite not having prior experience at international level of any kind, Meunier put out a good performance, delivering a decisive cross that was converted into a goal by his club teammate Henri Mouton in an eventual 5–2 loss.

In 1910, Meunier signed for CASG Paris, which is the club of Société Générale, a bank with no sporting ambitions, and whilst there, he became the head of the automobile department, since he knew how to drive despite having no license.

== Later life ==
Mobilized at the outbreak of the First World War, Meunier was discharged after the perforation of an eardrum, due to the explosion of a shell nearby, but whose fragments did not hit him, and he was then assigned to an automobile service, allowing the transport of troops, weapons, and food until the end of the War. (Note: Some sources wrongly state that he died for France on 27 October 1914, but that was a different Maurice Meunier.)

In May 1918, Meunier, now in FC Lyon, started in the first-ever final of the Coupe de France, which ended in a 0–3 loss to Olympique Pantin. In the summer of 1919, the 29-year-old Meunier was a member of the French committee that went to the Inter-Allied Games in Paris, a large sports competition organized in celebration of the Allied victory in the War, where he won the 110m hurdles after improving his personal record to 16,8 seconds.

== Death ==
In 1929, Meunier settled in Courbevoie, where he died on 27 February 1971, at the age of 81.

== Honours ==
FC Lyon

- Coupe de France:
  - Runner-up: 1917–18
