= Faroux =

Faroux is a French surname. Notable people with the surname include:

- Bernard Faroux, French cinema and television man
- Charles Faroux (1872–1957), French automotive engineer and journalist
- Fernand Faroux (1887–1918), French footballer
- Josuah Faroux (born 1994), French trampolinist
