= Félix Vial =

French footballer

Personal information
- Date of birth: 14 August 1894
- Place of birth: 12th arrondissement of Paris, France
- Date of death: 25 January 1915 (aged 20)
- Place of death: Vienne-le-Château, France
- Position: Left winger

Senior career*
Years	Team	Apps	(Gls)
1911–1912	CA Vitry		

International career
1911	France	1	(0)
- * Club domestic league appearances and goals

Félix Vial (14 August 1894 – 25 January 1915) was a French footballer who played as a left winger for CA Vitry and the French national team in the early 1910s. Even though he had an ephemeral life, which ended at the hands of the First World War, he remains the youngest player in the history of the French national team, aged 17 years and 75 days.

== Biography ==
Vial played for CA Vitry during the 1911–12 season. The match reports referred to him as "F. Vial", to distinguish him from his brother Georges, which initially caused some confusion with Henri Vialmonteil, who at the time was called "Vial" in short. On 17 October 1911, after only one championship match, the 17-year-old Vial was called up to the French national team for a friendly match against Luxembourg, being selected by the CFI as a last-minute replacement to Jules Verbrugge, who did not want to travel to Luxembourg, following a good performance in a trial match.

Vial thus earned his first and last international cap against Luxembourg on 29 October 1911, and in doing so at the age of 17 years and 75 days, he became the youngest player in the history of the French national team, and even though a full century has passed since his debut, he still is the holder of this record, with the one who came the closest being Eduardo Camavinga in 2020, at the age of 17 years and 9 months. He played this match as a winger alongside his club teammate Viallemonteil, and despite the 4–1 victory, the French newspaper L'Auto credited him with a poor performance, stating that "Vial was pitiful". Two days later, he took part in a match for his club against Red Star FC where he performances poorly again, thus failing to confirm "the choice of the CFI selection committee, showing himself to be much inferior to his colleagues".

== Death ==
Following the outbreak of the First World War in July 1914, Vial became a second-class private of the 161st regiment, being "killed by the enemy" during the First Battle of Champagne on 25 January 1915, at the age of 20, near Vienne-le-Château in Argonne (Marne). However, the weekly newspaper Sporting only reported his death a year later, in March 1916, stating that "the international F. Vial, of CA Vitry, died on the field of honor".
