= Simon Sollier =

French footballer (1890–1955)

Personal information
- Full name: Simon Joseph Auguste Sollier
- Date of birth: 6 April 1890
- Place of birth: 5th arrondissement of Paris, France
- Date of death: 1 July 1955 (aged 65)
- Place of death: Villers-sur-Coudun, France
- Height: 1.71 m (5 ft 7 in)
- Position: Defender

Senior career*
| Years | Team | Apps | (Gls) |
| 1908–1909 | Club athlétique de Paris 14 | | |
| 1909–1911 | CA Vitry | | |
| 1913–1914 | Etoile du XIIIème | | |

International career
| 1909–1911 | France | 5 | (0) |
- * Club domestic league appearances and goals

Simon Joseph Auguste Sollier (6 April 1890 – 1 July 1955) was a French footballer who played as a defender for CA Vitry and the French national team in the early 1910s.

== Playing career ==
=== Club career ===
Born in the 5th arrondissement of Paris on 6 April 1890, (Note: Some sources wrongly claim that he was born on 2 October 1891.) Sollier first played for Club athlétique de Paris 14, a team based in the 14th arrondissement which was affiliated with the USFSA. He joined its first team in 1908, but in the following year, he joined the ranks of CA Vitry, which was affiliated with the FCAF. Together with Henri Vascout and Étienne Jourde, he played a crucial role in the CA Vitry team that won back-to-back FCAF Championships in 1910 and 1911. This qualified the club to compete in the Trophée de France; they reached the 1910 final and lost 0–2 to Patronage Olier.

Sollier was described as having "a good kick, played with composure, quickly". At the end of 1911, Sollier was sent to Nancy to do his military service, thus disappearing from Vitry's line-ups. He returned to football two years later, in 1913, this time with a more modest club, Etoile du XIIIème. Outside football, Sollier worked as a typographer in a printing works.

=== International career ===
On 22 May 1909, the 19-year-old Sollier earned his first and only international cap against England amateurs, which ended in a 0–11 loss. Sollier and Gaston Brébion, the two fullbacks of France, were blamed for this humiliating result by the local press, who stated that they were the team's weak point, "especially in the first half, where they committed serious mistakes and even managed two own goals". The English sources for this match do not mention an own goal; the reference is probably to the opening goal of the match, when Sollier "screwed" a clearance under the charge of Vivian Woodward, to whom the goal is traditionally attributed.

The following year, Sollier played a further three friendly matches for France, all of which ended in losses. This included a heavy 1–10 defeat to England, although the local press stated that he "had very sure saves" and even that he "lived up to his reputation and saved difficult situations". His fifth and last selection came against Hungary, which ended in yet another loss (0–3); this time he was criticized by journalists, who suggested that he had to give a gift to the FCAF's leaders, the Chailloux brothers (Henri and Louis).

== Later life ==
Sollier was mobilized at the outbreak of World War I as a sergeant in the 103rd Infantry Regiment. He was captured on 22 August 1914, in Ethé, in Wallonia, during the Battle of the Frontiers. He was held in Cassel and was released four years later, on 20 July 1918, with suspected tuberculosis.

== Death and legacy ==
Sollier died in Villers-sur-Coudun on 1 July 1955, at the age of 65.

Like many other French international football players from the start of the 20th century, Sollier was the victim of mistakes by historians, being initially given the first name André. This error persisted until the 21st century, even appearing in the Equipe de France de Football, l'Intégrale des 497 rencontres ("French Football Team, All 497 Matches"), a book published by the French Football Federation in 1991. This was the result of a confusion with Léon André Sollier, originally from Pantin, who died at the start of the First World War in 1914. It was not until 2022 that the French football historian Pierre Cazal found the initial S as his first name on several occasions in the French press of the time, and thus, following a quick glance at the digitized military records of conscripts, Simon Sollier was found.

== Honours ==
CA Vitry

- FCAF Championships
  - Champions (2): 1910 and 1911
- Trophée de France:
  - Runner-up (1): 1910
