= Fernand Faroux =

French footballer

Personal information
- Full name: Camille Fernand Faroux
- Date of birth: 13 July 1887
- Place of birth: Les Lilas, Paris, France
- Date of death: 30 July 1918 (aged 31)
- Place of death: 12th arrondissement of Paris, France
- Height: 1.63 m (5 ft 4 in)
- Position: Midfielder

Senior career*
Years	Team	Apps	(Gls)
1911–1918	Olympique de Pantin		

International career
1912	France	1	(0)
- * Club domestic league appearances and goals

Camille Fernand Faroux (13 July 1887 – 30 July 1918) was a French footballer who played as a midfielder for Olympique de Pantin and the French national team in the early 1910s.

== Career ==
Born on 13 July 1887 in Les Lilas, Paris, (Note: Some sources wrongly claim that he was born in 1891.) Faroux began his football career at his hometown club Olympique de Pantin in 1911, aged 24. The following year, on 7 March 1912, he earned his first (and only) international cap in a friendly match against Italy in Turin, helping France achieve its first-ever victory over the Italians (4–3).

During the outbreak of World War I in 1914, Faroux was mobilized within the 2nd Battalion of foot hunters, but following a fracture of the right humerus suffered in combat, he was reformed in 1915. He then played a crucial role in the Pantin team that won the 1916 Coupe de France, beating Étoile des Deux Lacs in the final.

Outside football, he worked as a tinsmith (making and selling tinplate objects).

== Death ==
Following a long and painful illness, Faroux died at his Parisian home on 30 July 1918, at the age of 31, a few weeks before the Armistice of 11 November 1918. He was buried two days later, on 1 August.

== Honours ==
- Coupe de France
  - Champions (1): 1916

== Bibliography ==
- Perry, Raphaël (2021). Bleus éphémères [Ephemeral blues] (in French). Paris: Hugo Sport. p. 39. ISBN 978-2-7556-9244-0.
