= Fresse =

- Commune
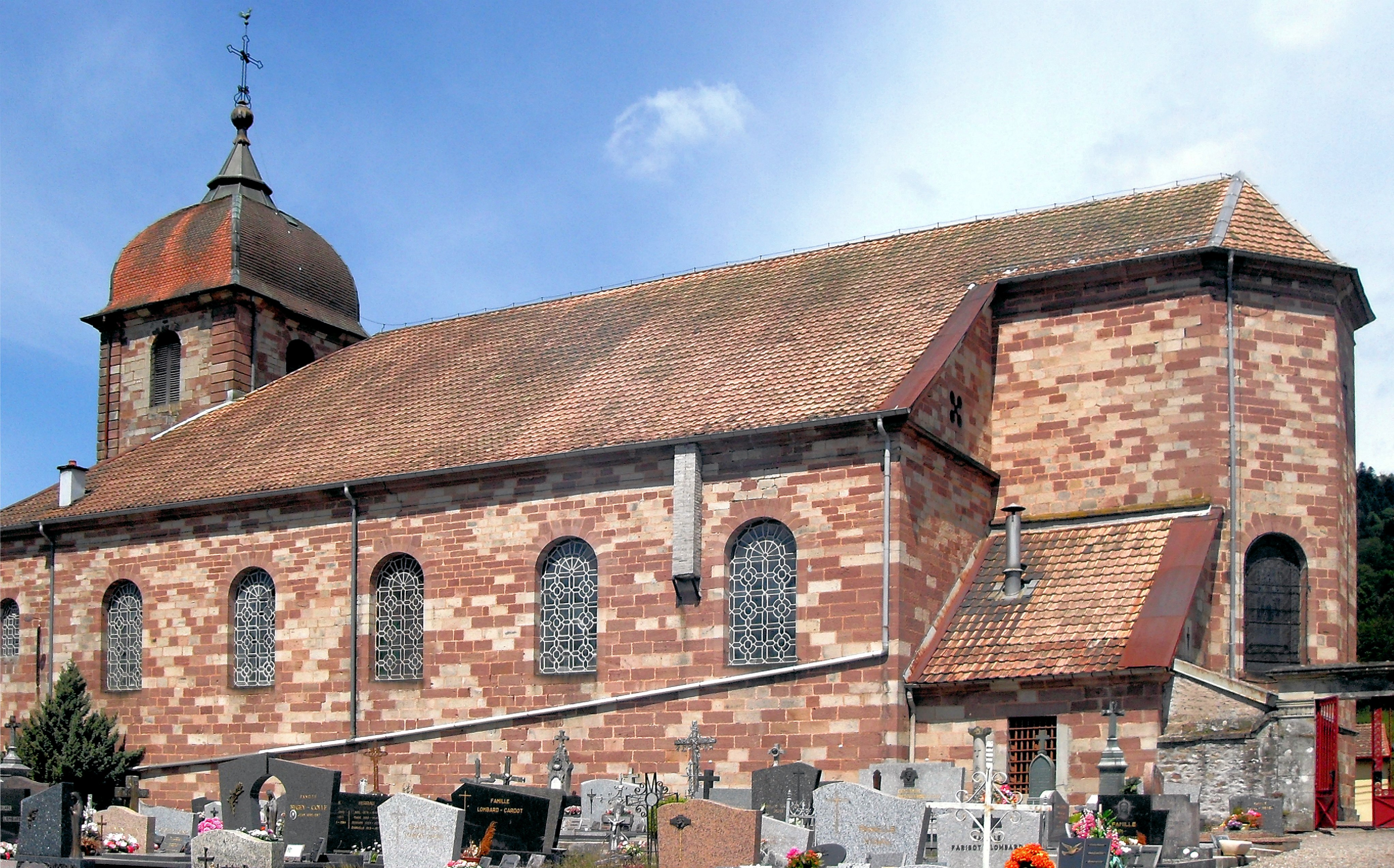
- The church in Fresse

- Coat of arms
- Location of Fresse
- Location within France Location within Bourgogne-Franche-Comté
- Coordinates: 47°45′30″N 6°39′29″E
- Country: France
- Region: Bourgogne-Franche-Comté
- Department: Haute-Saône
- Arrondissement: Lure
- Canton: Mélisey

Government
  - Mayor (2020–2026): Alain Dague
- Area^{1}: 27.15 km^{2} (10.48 sq mi)
- Highest elevation: 896 m (2,940 ft)
- Lowest elevation: 340 m (1,120 ft)
- Population (2023): 687
  - Density: 25.3/km^{2} (65.5/sq mi)
- Time zone: UTC+01:00 (CET)
  - Summer (DST): UTC+02:00 (CEST)
- INSEE/Postal code: 70256 /70270
- ^{1} French Land Register data, which excludes lakes, ponds, glaciers > 1 km^{2} (0.386 sq mi or 247 acres) and river estuaries.

Fresse (French pronunciation: [fʁɛs]) is a commune in the Haute-Saône department in the region of Bourgogne-Franche-Comté in eastern France.

== See also ==
- Communes of the Haute-Saône department
