= Villers-sur-Coudun =

- Commune
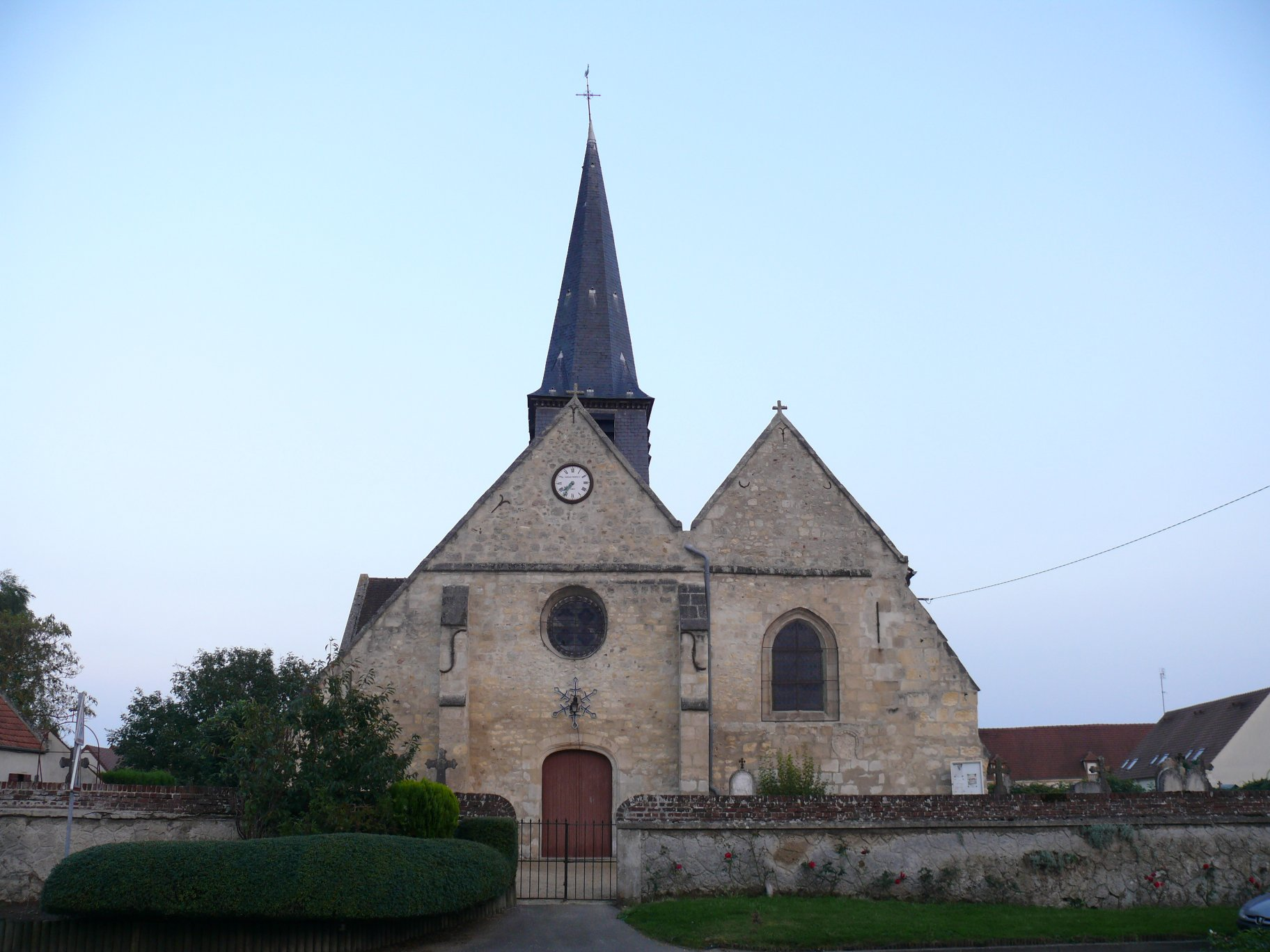
- The church in Villers-sur-Coudun
- Location of Villers-sur-Coudun
- Location within France Location within Hauts-de-France
- Coordinates: 49°29′00″N 2°48′15″E
- Country: France
- Region: Hauts-de-France
- Department: Oise
- Arrondissement: Compiègne
- Canton: Estrées-Saint-Denis
- Intercommunality: Pays des Sources

Government
  - Mayor (2021–2026): Antoine Barbet
- Area^{1}: 6.39 km^{2} (2.47 sq mi)
- Elevation: 59 m (194 ft)
- Highest elevation: 156 m (512 ft)
- Lowest elevation: 46 m (151 ft)
- Population (2023): 1,421
  - Density: 222/km^{2} (576/sq mi)
- Time zone: UTC+01:00 (CET)
  - Summer (DST): UTC+02:00 (CEST)
- INSEE/Postal code: 60689 /60150
- ^{1} French Land Register data, which excludes lakes, ponds, glaciers > 1 km^{2} (0.386 sq mi or 247 acres) and river estuaries.

Villers-sur-Coudun (French pronunciation: [vilɛʁ syʁ kudœ̃], literally Villers on Coudun) is a commune in the Oise department in northern France.

== Population ==
Historical population
Year	Pop.	±% p.a.
1968	354	—
1975	590	+7.57%
1982	1,008	+7.95%
1990	1,121	+1.34%
1999	1,286	+1.54%
2007	1,395	+1.02%
2012	1,384	−0.16%
2017	1,407	+0.33%
2023	1,421	+0.17%
Source: INSEE

== See also ==
- Communes of the Oise department
