= Vienne-le-Château =

- Commune
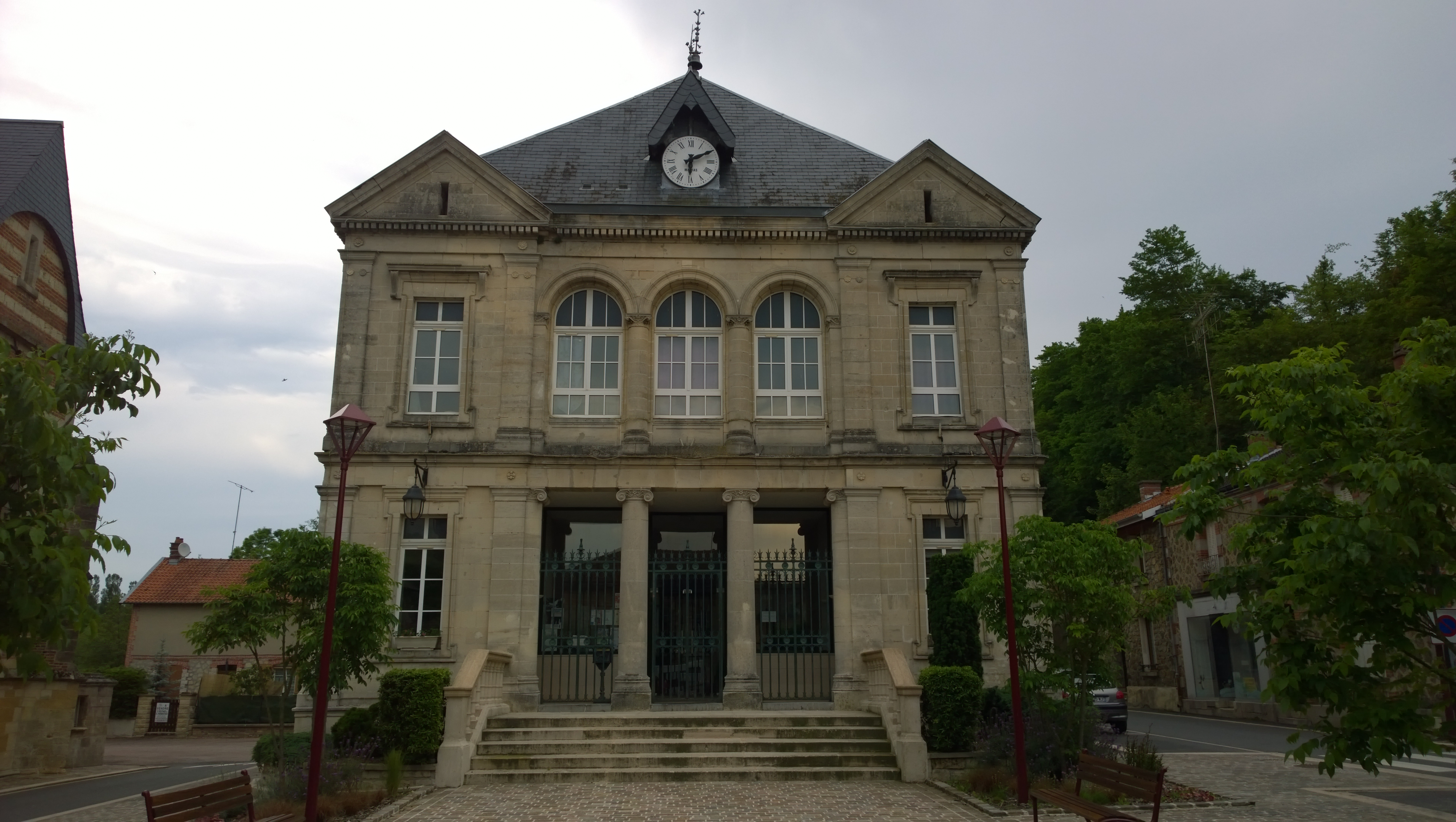
- The town hall in Vienne-le-Château

- Coat of arms
- Location of Vienne-le-Château
- Location within France Location within Grand Est
- Coordinates: 49°11′30″N 4°53′19″E
- Country: France
- Region: Grand Est
- Department: Marne
- Arrondissement: Châlons-en-Champagne
- Canton: Argonne Suippe et Vesle
- Intercommunality: Argonne Champenoise

Government
  - Mayor (2020–2026): Dominique Schneider
- Area^{1}: 51.36 km^{2} (19.83 sq mi)
- Elevation: 130 m (430 ft)
- Population (2023): 516
  - Density: 10.0/km^{2} (26.0/sq mi)
- Time zone: UTC+01:00 (CET)
  - Summer (DST): UTC+02:00 (CEST)
- INSEE/Postal code: 51621 /51800
- ^{1} French Land Register data, which excludes lakes, ponds, glaciers > 1 km^{2} (0.386 sq mi or 247 acres) and river estuaries.

Vienne-le-Château (French pronunciation: [vjɛn lə ʃato]) is a commune in the Marne department in north-eastern France.

== History ==
The village dates back to the 6th century when it was the possession of the Bishop of Verdun. A castle stood on a hill in the west of the town. It was destroyed in 959 by Count Grandpre. Rebuilt several times, only ruins remain. In the 12th century, the area was purchased by Count of Bar. The village was destroyed during the Great War.

== Culture and heritage ==
=== Religious heritage ===
L'église Saint-Pierre-Saint-Paul is a church built during the 16th century. Built in the style of a Latin cross, the choir and the crossing were repaired between 1680 and 1690. Further work was undertaken from 1740 to 1744 and 1785 to 1788 when the facade, pillars in the nave, vaults and steeple were renovated. During the Great War, the church served as a first-aid station and was badly damaged, with the northern transept gutted and the steeple had collapsed. The church was repaired from 1925 and reopened for worship in 1930. It became a protected monument in 1922.

=== Civil heritage ===
A castle was recorded here in the middle of the 11th century, belonging to the Count of Grandpré, and in the 13th century to the Count of Bar. In the 14th century, it became the property of the king of France. It was destroyed in 1810 and all that remains is the site with a moat and a motte and the courtyard.

=== Places of remembrance of the Great War ===
Le Camp de la Vallée Moreau
Around 3 km north of the town, is the site of a German Camp called the "West Moreau Valley", where troops held in reserve during World War One stayed. It was occupied from February 1915 until September 1918. In 1997, work started to reconstruct the camp.

La Nécropole Nationale de La Harazée
This military cemetery was created in 1915 during the Battle of Argonne and has bodies exhumed from two other cemeteries. It has been enlarged over the years, first in 1924 then again in 1935 and 1936. It contains the graves of 1,672 French soldiers from Great War and one from World War Two. The last renovation of the site occurred in 1963.

L'ossuaire de La Gruerie
The ossuary was created in 1923 and houses the remains of around 10,000 unnamed soldiers. The site was inaugurated on 7 July 1929. A stone wall, with the inscription Aux Morts de la Gruerie 1914-1918 stands over the ossuary with a niche containing a female statue with folded wings representing Victoria. With the face of Marianne and wearing a Phrygian cap, she holds the flame of remembrance in her right hand while her raised left arm and hand symbolise the collection of the dead. A basement lies below with a gallery with plaques to the dead. The statue is by Raoul Lamourdedieu.

== Gallery ==
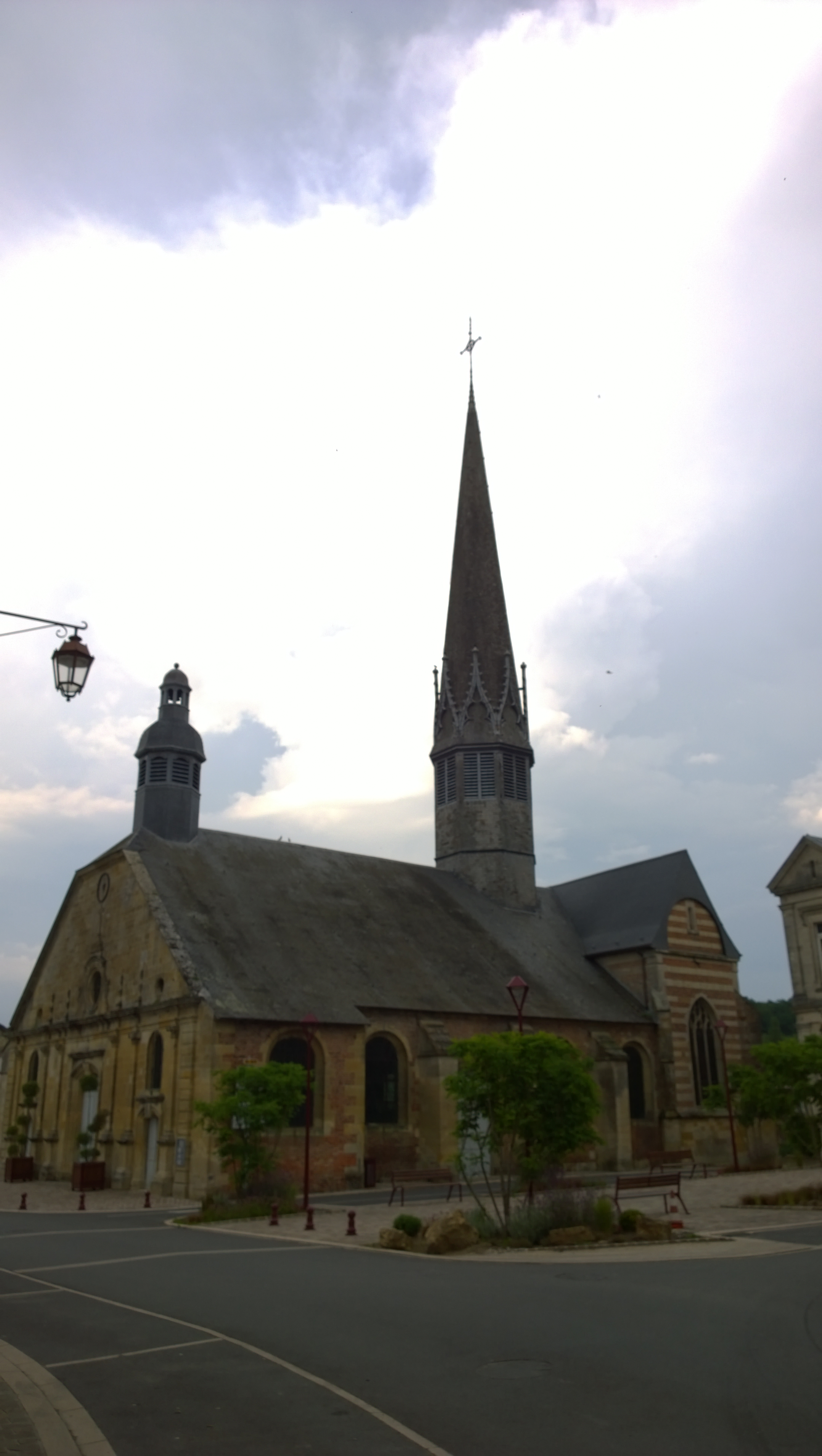
Church of Saint-Pierre-Saint-Paul

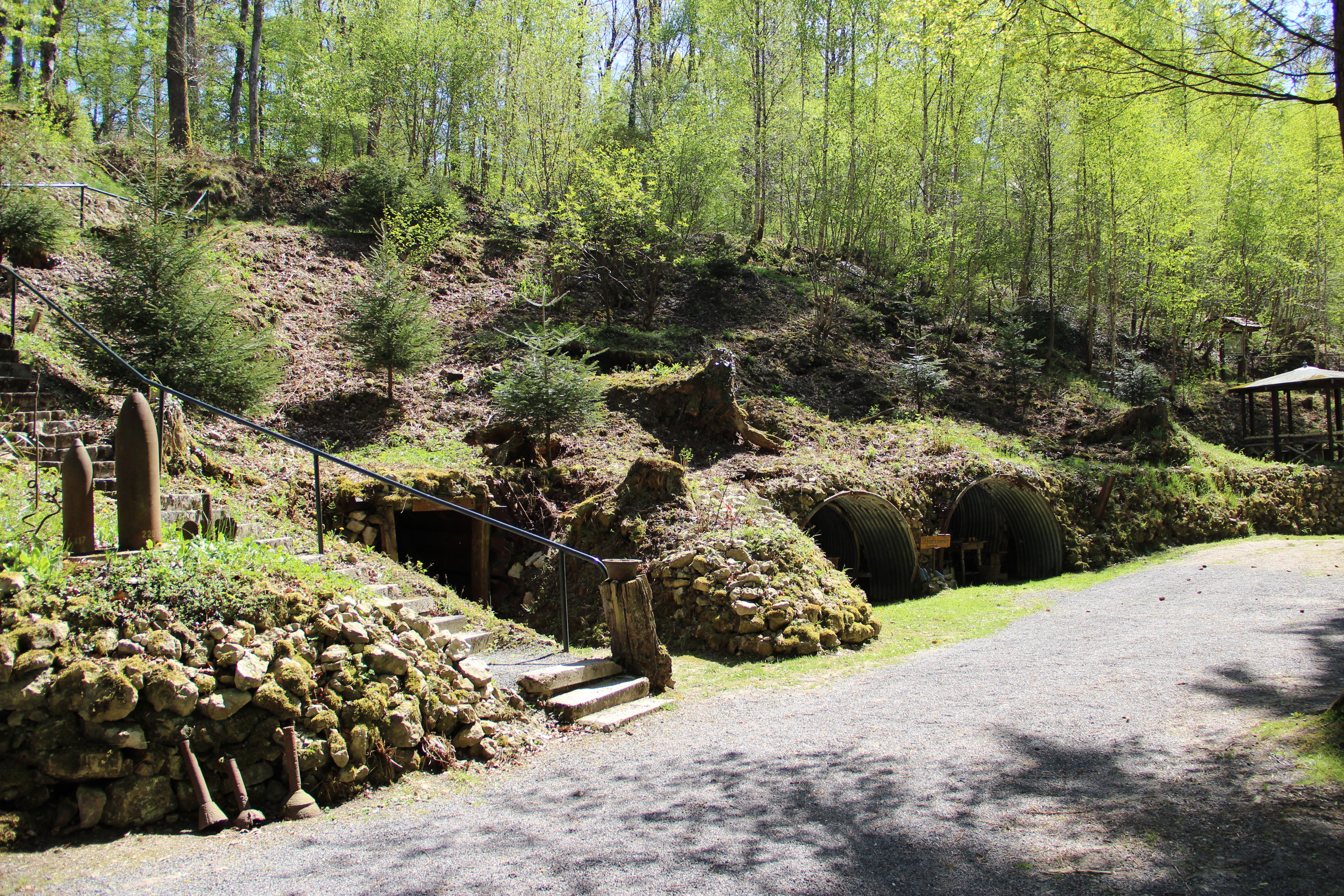
German camp

== See also ==
- Communes of the Marne department
