= Jean-Pierre LaFouge =

Philosopher and French literature Ph.D.

Jean-Pierre LaFouge is an associate professor of French at Marquette University. He is the author and editor of several books and numerous articles, dealing with topics of Christian spirituality, religious art, and Traditionalism.

== Biography ==
LaFouge was born in 1944 in Champagne, France. He studied philosophy at Nancy and taught philosophy in several lycées in France and in Morocco from 1962 to 1976. His academic career took him to the United States where he obtained a Ph.D. in French literature in 1986 from Indiana University, specializing in nineteenth- and seventeenth-century French and Orientalist Literature.

He is the author of several articles dealing with the relationship between art, Orientalism, philosophy and literature. LaFouge has also published a book on Eugène Fromentin, one on Jesuit spirituality, and worked on the revision of French to English translations of the writings of Traditionalist writer Frithjof Schuon.

== Bibliography ==
- Etude Sur L'Orientalisme D'Eugene Fromentin Dans Ses "Recits Algeriens" (Peter Lang Pub Inc, 1989)
- For God's Greater Glory: Gems of Jesuit Spirituality (World Wisdom, 2006)

== See also ==
- Frithjof Schuon
- Traditionalist School
- Orientalism
