= 1916 Coupe de France =

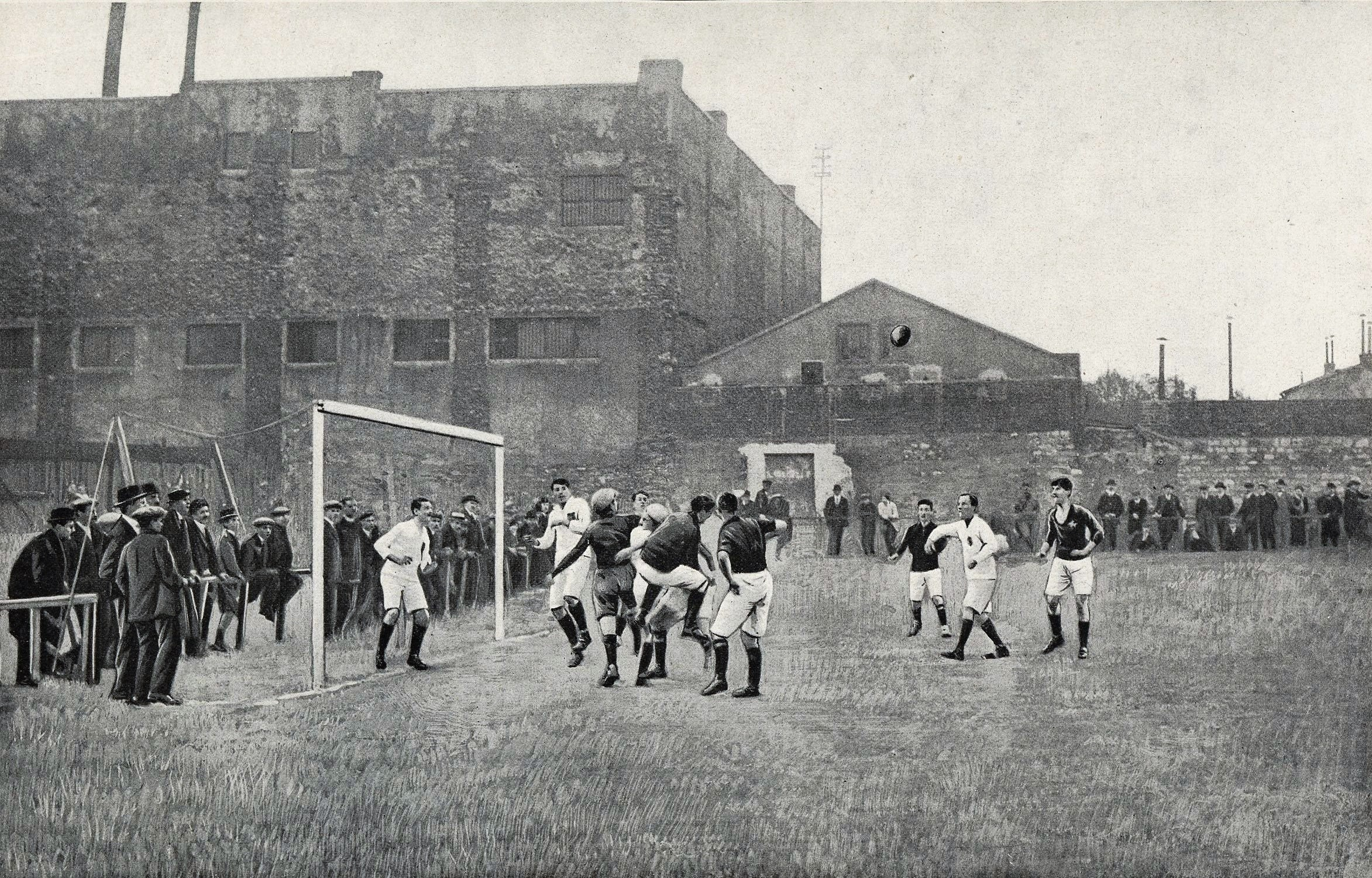
- Photo of the final between Olympique (light) and Étoile des Deux Lacs (dark).

Tournament details
- Country: France (CFI)
- Teams: 3

Final positions
- Champions: Olympique de Pantin (1st title)
- Runners-up: Étoile des Deux Lacs

Tournament statistics
- Matches played: 2
- Goals scored: 4 (2 per match)
- Top goal scorer: Delouis (2 goals)

The 1916 Coupe de France was a football competition organized by the French Interfederal Committee (CFI) between the champions of each federation that makes up the said committee. Due to its similarities to CFI's previous inter-federation national competition, the Trophée de France, which had been contested every year from 1907 until the outbreak of the First World War in 1914, many historians have labeled this tournament as its 9th and last edition. Some sources have wrongly claimed that this tournament was in fact the first unofficial edition of the Coupe de France, which was established in the following year by the CFI, but this is not true since the latter was open to all clubs from different federations.

It was won by Olympique de Pantin, the champions of the LFA, after claiming a 3–0 victory over the champions of FGSPF, Étoile des Deux Lacs, in the final. In the French press, this competition is described as the "French war championship" and its winner, Olympique, as the "French champion".

== Background ==
The outbreak of the First World War forced the various French federations involved in association football, including the CFI, to stop their usual competitions, but fortunately, this period was not excessively long because, from 1915 onwards, these sporting competitions and spectacles gradually resumed in France, first justified by the need to train the next generation of sports and military personnel and to celebrate the fraternity uniting the allies. Therefore, from the first months of the conflict, the CFI's four biggest football federations in France replaced the old cups with the so-called "wartime cups", with the USFSA replacing its national championship with the USFSA Coupe Nationale, the LFA replaced its championship with the Challenge de la Renommée, the FCAF replaced its championship with the Challenge de la Victoire, and the FGSPF replaced its championship with the FGSPF Coupe Nationale.

Finally, in 1915, the CFI decided to create a new competition integrating all new championship winners from all four federations, and although the USFSA refused to take part, the other three did. Given the mobilization of Frenchmen to the war, these "wartime cups" were mainly contested by players under the age of twenty. It was initially understood that Olympique Lillois, the winner of the 1914 Trophée de France, would offer that trophy, which had been donated by Pierre de Coubertin, to the winner of the tournament at the end of the war (which never happened), so in the meantime, the reward for the winners would instead be a Cup offered by the Paris Municipal Council, whose president wanted to give the CFI a tangible sign of its encouragement and its high approval.

== Participants ==
The Étoile des deux lacs won the 1916 FGSPF Coupe Nationale by beating the Bousbotte Association of Besançon in a closely contested final; the result was 2–1 after extra-time.

Olympique de Pantin won the LFA's Challenge de la Renommée for three years in a row between 1915 and 1917, and was thus the representative of the LFA champion. The champions of FCAF's 1915–16 Challenge de la Victoire was a certain Union Athlétique du 20ème, but in the end it was VGA Médoc, which had won its seven matches played in the Midi region, the club designated by the FCAF.

Clubs	Town	Federation
(Paris) Étoile des Deux Lacs	Paris	Gymnastic and Sports Federation of French Patronages (FGSPF)
(Bordeaux) VGA Médoc	Bordeaux	French Amateur Cycling Federation (FCAF)
(Paris) Olympique de Pantin	Pantin	Ligue de Football Association (LFA)

== Tournament ==
=== Semi-final ===
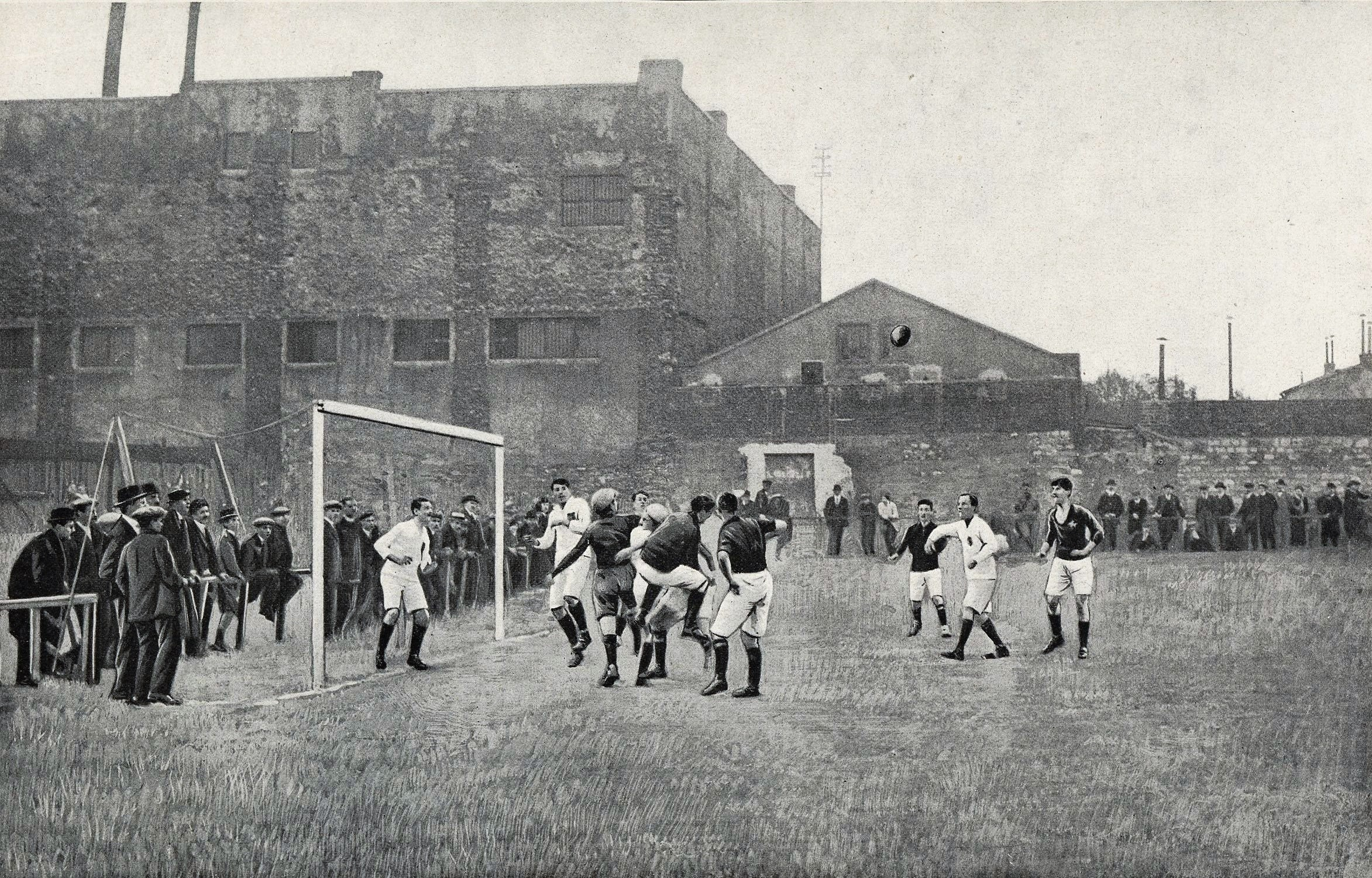
Photo of the final between Olympique (light) and Étoile des Deux Lacs (dark).

Due to being an odd number of participants, the CFI held a draw, in which FGSPF's Étoile received the bye to the final, which was going to be held either in Paris, in the case of victory for Olympique, or in Bordeaux, in the case of victory for Médoc. The semifinal was thus held between Olympique and Médoc on 6 May, and the journalists of L'Auto (the forerunner of L'Équipe) stated that "the many spectators who made the trip to the Parc des Princes did not regretted it because the match was very interesting during the full two hours of play it lasted".

Even though Médoc scored a goal ruled out for offside in the first half, neither side was able to break the deadlock within 90 minutes, and thus extra-time had to be played, during which it began to rain heavily, but while Olympique showed itself to be in its element, their opponents seemed bothered by it. In the middle of the first extra time, Olympique scored the only goal of the match thanks to a shot of Delouy that was "missed" by Saleh, one of Médoc's defenders, which caught his goalkeeper Godichon off guard. Another source states that during the first period of the "half-hour extension" granted by the referee, Olympique scored thanks to the clumsiness of two full-backs. The rain stopped almost at the same time as the first period of extra time ended, and despite Médoc's efforts in the second period, it was Olympique who scored again through Jacques, but the goal was disallowed. Olympique thus won by the score of 1–0 and advanced to the final.

7 May 1916
15:30

Olympique de Pantin	1 – 0	VGA Médoc
Delouis 98'	Report

Parc des Princes, Paris
Referee: Lebrun

=== Final ===
The final was held on 14 May 1916 at Stade Paris in Saint-Ouen, and Olympique defeated Étoile by a score of 3–0. The goals were scored by Delouis, Faroux and Quilleret. The match's revenue amounted to around 650 francs (currently around €1,500), most of which was to be used to send balls to the Western Front.

14 May 1916

Olympique de Pantin	3 – 0	Étoile des Deux Lacs
Delouis; Faroux; Quilleret Decoux; Fiévet, Daled; Webb, Michon, Bouvard; Faroux, Delouis, Quilleret, Jacques, François	Report	Bizouard; Gauthier, Thélu; Dépréaux, Gee, Zehuter; Marcelline, Hayden, Mullier, Michaud, Dupont

Stade Paris, Saint-Ouen
Attendance: 1,000

== See also ==
- Challenge de la Renommée
