= Jules Verbrugge =

French footballer (1886-1921)

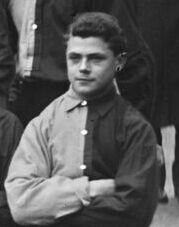
- Verbugge, 1906

Personal information
- Full name: Jules Louis Adrien Verbrugge
- Date of birth: 27 October 1886
- Place of birth: Paris, France
- Date of death: 22 February 1921 (aged 34)
- Place of death: Paris, France
- Height: 1.61 m (5 ft 3 in)
- Position: Forward

Senior career*
Years	Team	Apps	(Gls)
1905–1910	AS Française		
1910–1916	Red Star		

International career
1906–1910	France	4	(0)
- * Club domestic league appearances and goals

Jules Louis Adrien Verbrugge (27 October 1886 — 22 February 1921) was a French footballer who played as a forward for Red Star and the French national team.

== Early life ==
Jules Adrien Verbrugge was born in Paris on 27 October 1886, as the son of Cornelis Adriaan Verbrugge, a Dutch from Bergeijk and a shoemaker by trade, while the mother was described as a domestic cook. His father was not naturalized French, as proven by the fact that at the marriage in 1891, at the age of 53, authorization from the Dutch consulate had to be produced, which means that Jules Verbrugge could have opted for his father's nationality when he came of age, but he instead opted for that of his mother and completed his military service in France.

== Footballing career ==
=== Club career ===
In 1905, Verbrugge began his career playing as a winger for AS Française, being fast, lively, and piercing thanks to his lighter build of just 1.61 meters tall and weight of only 50 kg. However, instead of crossing, like most wingers at the time, he was mainly concerned with going straight to the goal and shooting, and this style was criticized as being too "personal". He did not hesitate to shoot from 25 meters, and took it upon himself to execute penalties, both of which being unusual for a winger.

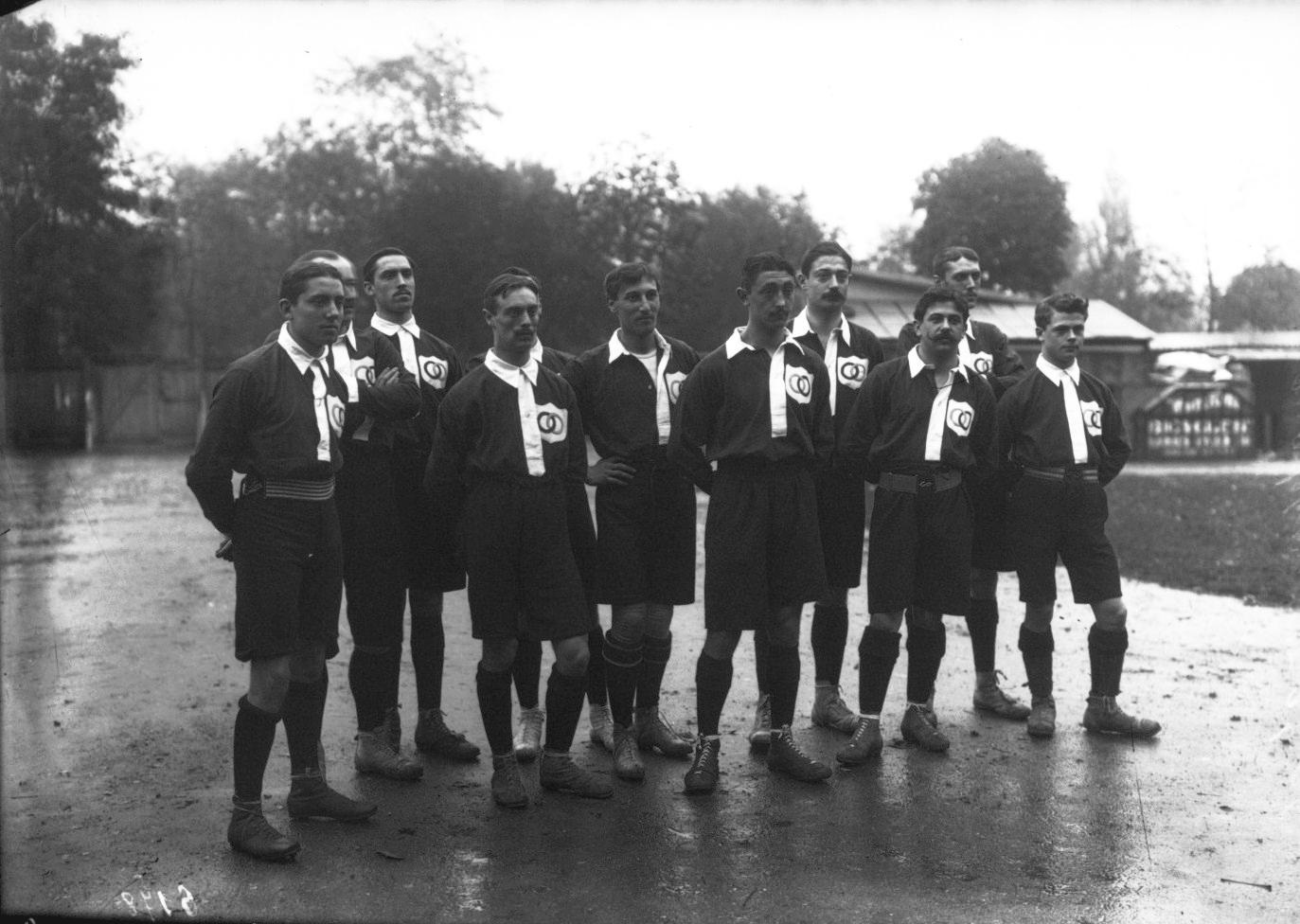
Verbrugge, far right, on the day of his debut for France, 1 November 1906

After disappearing from the football fields for a few years due to his military service, Verbruggeto reappeared in 1909, when he signed for Red Star, playing for the club until his death in 1921. Oddly enough, during the 1911–12 season, Verbrugge helped out at Red Star by pairing up at the back with Alfred Gindrat, in order to make up for the absences of Lucien Gamblin when he did not get leave from the Army. He then disappeared from the radar again, only to reappear after long periods of absence, such as in December 1913, after 8 months, without it being known whether he had been injured or just distancing himself from football.

=== International career ===
On 1 November 1906, the 20-year-old Verbrugge made his debut for France in a 15–0 loss to England Amateurs. Due to a mistake in his civil status that persisted through time, he was wrongly considered the youngest French international in the 2010s, at the age of 16 years and 306 days; this figure was the result of a confusion with a certain Julien Émile Verbrugghe, born in Roubaix on 26 December 1889. This information was then spread by several media outlets, especially in September 2020 during Eduardo Camavinga's first selection at the age of 17.

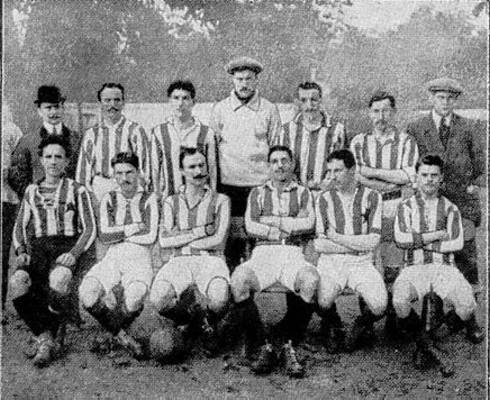
Red Star football team, 1910. Verbrugge is seated on the far right.

With Red Star joining the French Interfederal Committee (CFI) in 1910, Verbrugge found the opportunity to wear the national jersey again, in 1911, three times, but failed to shine in any of them. He was even severely criticized in one of them: "more and more stubbornly insisted on shooting directly instead of passing to his better-placed partners". In total, he made four international caps for France.

== Death ==
As a result of the First World War, Verbrugge joined the 71st Infantry Division of the French Army, and was wounded by a rifle bullet to the right leg, received at the very end of the First Battle of the Marne on 10 September 1914. This resulted in him being discharged and limping. In the absence of additional information, it remains unknown whether this injury, apparently not life-threatening, played a role in the player's premature death, on 22 February 1921, at the age of 34, which was not reported by the newspapers.
