= Jean Ducret =

French footballer (1887–1975)

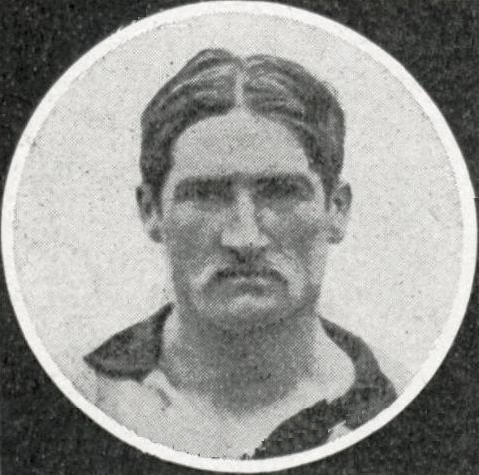
- Jean Ducret in 1913

Personal information
- Full name: Jean Ducret
- Date of birth: 27 November 1887
- Place of birth: Suresnes, France
- Date of death: 19 November 1975 (aged 87)
- Place of death: Vaucresson, France
- Position: Midfielder

Senior career*
Years	Team	Apps	(Gls)
	Puteaux	–	(–)
	Etoile des Deux Lacs	–	(–)
	Olympique Lillois	–	(–)
	Stade Français	–	(–)
	AS Français	–	(–)

International career
1910–1914	France	20	(3)
- * Club domestic league appearances and goals

Jean Ducret (27 November 1887 – 19 November 1975) was a French international footballer. He played as a midfielder and played for five teams, most notably Olympique Lillois and Stade Français. Ducret was one of the national team's first-ever permanent captains having served in the role 13 times in 20 appearances from 1910 to 1914. Ducret also scored three goals for the team, which included his first-ever against Italy in a 6–2 defeat in May 1910.
