= Maurice Olivier =

French footballer (1887-1978)

Personal information
- Date of birth: 10 January 1887
- Date of death: 15 May 1978 (aged 91)

International career
Years	Team	Apps	(Gls)
1910–1914	France	5	(0)

Maurice Olivier (10 January 1887 – 15 May 1978) was a French footballer. He played in five matches for the France national football team from 1910 to 1914. He was also named in France's squad for the football tournament at the 1912 Summer Olympics, but the French side withdrew from the competition.
