= Charles Simon (sports manager) =

French sports manager (1882–1915)

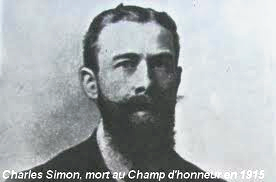
- Charles Simon in 1915

Secretary General of the FGSPF
- In office 1905–1915

President of the French Interfederal Committee
- In office 1907–1915
- Succeeded by: Henri Delaunay

Secretary General of the FGSPF
- In office 1911–1915
- Succeeded by: Armand Thibaudeau

Personal details
- Born: Charles Maurice Simon; 25 September 1882 16th arrondissement of Paris, France
- Died: 15 June 1915 (aged 32) Écurie, Pas-de-Calais, France

Charles Maurice Simon (25 September 1882 – 15 June 1915) was a French lawyer and a sports manager who served as the secretary general of the FGSPF and FICEP, from 1905 and 1911, respectively, until his death in 1915. In order to defend the development of football, he founded and presided over the short-lived French Interfederal Committee (CFI), which would later become the French Football Federation (FFF) in 1919. The name of Charles Simon has been attached to the Coupe de France since its creation in 1917.

In addition to sports, he was also a lover of the French language, poetry, and music.

== Early life and education ==
Charles Simon was born in the 16th arrondissement of Paris on 25 September 1882, (Note: Other sources wrongly claim that he was born on 29 June 1882.) into a bourgeois family originally from Normandy, as the son of Aimable Corentin Simon, a doctor in the 15th arrondissement of Paris, and Elise Mouchet, a housewife. He grew up in a modest home and had a hard-working childhood, which resulted in a humility that would mark Charles' personality, remaining a reserved person, even for his close friends throughout his life.

His family was rather inclined towards the masses, and therefore, Simon began frequenting the patronages very early on, notably that of the parish of Saint-Honoré d'Eylau in the 16th arrondissement. Simon was thus a fervent Catholic. He was then quick to join the FGSPF, then presided by the good doctor Paul Michaux, a surgeon at the Paris hospitals, who decided to hire Simon as his assistant in 1898, aged only 16.

After studying at the Lycée Buffon, Simon enrolled in the law faculty and obtained his degree in 1902, and after completing his military service, he registered for the internship on 2 December 1904. He was also a Laureate of the Faculty of Law of Paris.

== Sports managerial career ==
=== Early career ===
During his time at the parish of Saint-Honoré d'Eylau, Simon discovered the appeal and the educational interest of sports in its football team, the Étoile des Deux Lacs, which had been founded in 1898 by Father Abbé Biron, and who was thus quickly assisted by Simon and then by Henri Delaunay. Before Étoile's foundation in 1898, the young Simon might have played for Club Français, also based in Paris, because in January 1897, his surname appears in the line-up of CF's second team; Simon was only 14 years and three months old at the time, but that age was somewhat common in the second teams of those times. Either way, Simon eventually replaced Father Biron as the president of Étoile because in February 1903, he was the representative of Étoile in the USFSA's football commission. Étoile's first success under his presidency was being proclaimed champion of the patronages in 1904, and as such, the club then faced the champions of Paris, United SC on 1 May 1904, which ended in a 5–1 loss.

Despite being a good parishioner, his commitment to the FGSPF was not without ulterior motives either, because like so many Parisian clubs, he had good reasons not to be satisfied with the services of the USFSA, where he nevertheless sat on the football commission. As the president of Étoile, the very active Simon quickly climbed the ranks within the FGSPF, where alongside Michaux, he became president of the Association Football and Athletics Commission. On 15 July 1905, the federation was relocated to its first premises at 5 Place Saint-Thomas-d’Aquin, with Léon Lamoureux assuming administrative responsibilities on 14 November, working in tandem with Simon, who then became sports secretary general of the FGSPF in its 1905 congress.

=== Secretary General of the FGSPF ===
During his stint as the Secretary General of the FGSPF, Simon was the head of a great physical education movement that developed in the youth of the patronages, which kept growing from year to year, going from 700 gymnasts in its first competition in 1904, up to 120 societies and 4,000 gymnasts in 1915. In total, the FGSPF organized more than 20 gymnastics competitions between 1904 and 1914, along with many other sports competitions, such as athletics, fencing, tennis, and football championships, with the latter's inaugural edition being won by the association that he chaired, the Étoile des Deux Lacs in April 1905, a feat that was repeated by Étoile five more times for a total of two three-peats (1905–07 and 1911–13).

At the same time, Simon began campaigning at the international level in favor of Catholic sport, and therefore, in October 1905, he was FGSPF's representative for the upcoming Vatican Sports Congress in Rome, and when he returned to Paris, he brought with him the pontifical blessing of Pope Pius X, for all patronages and families. After this congress, which was attended by 900 athletes, Pope Pius X strongly encouraged foreign gymnasts to return, and Simon ensured that this wish was granted when this gathering was renewed in 1906, and again in 1908, despite the hostility of the French public authorities, which was joined by the USFSA, among others, whose opposition was based on the law concerning the separation of Church and State that had been promulgated on 9 December 1905, which kickstarted the war between secular footballers and the federation of patrons, each excluding the other.

"If the Union is afraid that being as strong as we are, we will seek to harm them, they are wrong. We are a physical education organization whose sole concern is to make the young people who come to us into robust men and we have too high an idea of our role to consider ourselves as entrepreneurs competing with the opposite house. On the contrary, we are always ready to extend a hand to those - wherever they come from - who work without ulterior motives for the physical regeneration of French youth."

— Simon in October 1906.

In October 1906, the "Paris Committee" reminded clubs that they must request the requalification of people who have been part of other federations (mainly the FGSPF) before requesting their admission to the USFSA; however, Ernest Weber, the star football journalist of L'Auto (the future L'Équipe), noted that this official statement was nothing, but a "good trick on the FGSPF". Simon thus visited the L'Auto newsroom to thank them, stating that the "ridiculous decision affecting the members of other federations made by the leaders of the Paris Committee has no value since it does not come from the power leaders of the USFSA", which Simon knew well from his short stay in their football commission back in 1903.

Simon, an ardent and tireless worker, worked every day, almost without taking a rest, and slowly built the FGSPF piece by piece, including the FGSPF regional unions of Algeria, Oran, and Tunisia, and these efforts were crowned with complete success. After the FGSPF's annual festival of 1906, IOC founder Pierre de Coubertin proposed Charles Simon to its general secretary, and although the latter rejected this offer, they remained friends. In 1909, Simon, who had already largely infiltrated Parisian sports life, was hired full-time by the FGSPF for a salary of 3,000 francs per year, thus becoming one of the first permanent directors appointed in the world of sport. At the outbreak of the First World War, the FGSPF had 43 regional unions, 1,650 societies, and more than 150,000 members.

=== French Interfederal Committee ===
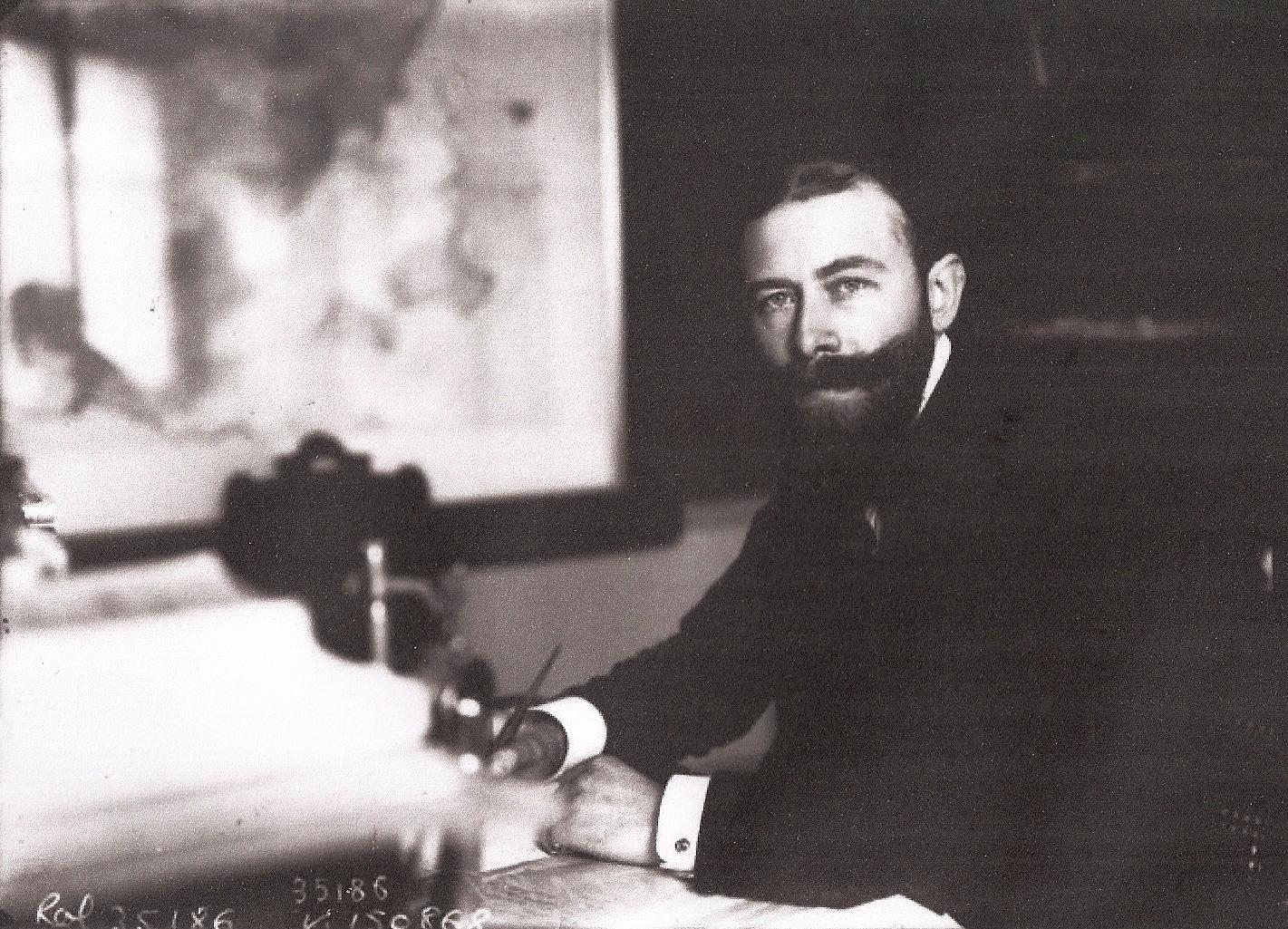
Simon, General Secretary of the FGSPF and founding Chairman of the CFI, in his office at 5, place Saint-Thomas-d'Aquin.

To defend football from the inertia of the USFSA, Simon decided to spearhead the establishment of the French Interfederal Committee (CFI) on 26 March 1907, becoming its first president. Created in principle to federate all the organizations worried or dissatisfied with the hegemonic attitude of the USFSA, the CFI, who was open to all without discrimination of any kind, was able to bring together a total of 490 sports societies (although not all of them played football), including the ones that had been excluded by the USFSA due to the latter's opposition to professionalism in sport; all of them regrouped under the banner of the CFI, who thus became a superstructure grouping the likes of FGSPF, FCAF, and Jules Rimet's LFA. Simon's CFI was then seen as a rival organization to the USFSA, and after they slammed the door on FIFA in June 1908, the CFI, on the lookout, rushed to take the vacated place. On 13 February 1908, Simon supported the CFI's application for membership in FIFA, and in December 1908, he went to London, to the FIFA headquarters, and obtained for the CFI the status of the sole French football representative recognized by FIFA. The headquarters of the CFI remained at the same location as the FGSPF: 5 Place Saint-Thomas-d'Aquin in Paris.

In 1907, Simon launched an appeal in the press to demand from the French Olympic Committee (COF), the right of the CFI to participate in the upcoming 1908 Summer Olympics, arguing that it was not reserved exclusively for the USFSA, and indeed, the rule of exclusivity granted to a single federation did not apply since the Olympic Games were not formally organized by FIFA. This appeal failed, but when the CFI joined FIFA, Simon was subsequently appointed secretary of the COF by Pierre de Coubertin himself, who then had excellent relations with Simon, who took advantage of the rules to register a second French team, hence why two French teams participated in the 1908 Olympics, one controlled by the USFSA and the other by CFI/FIFA.

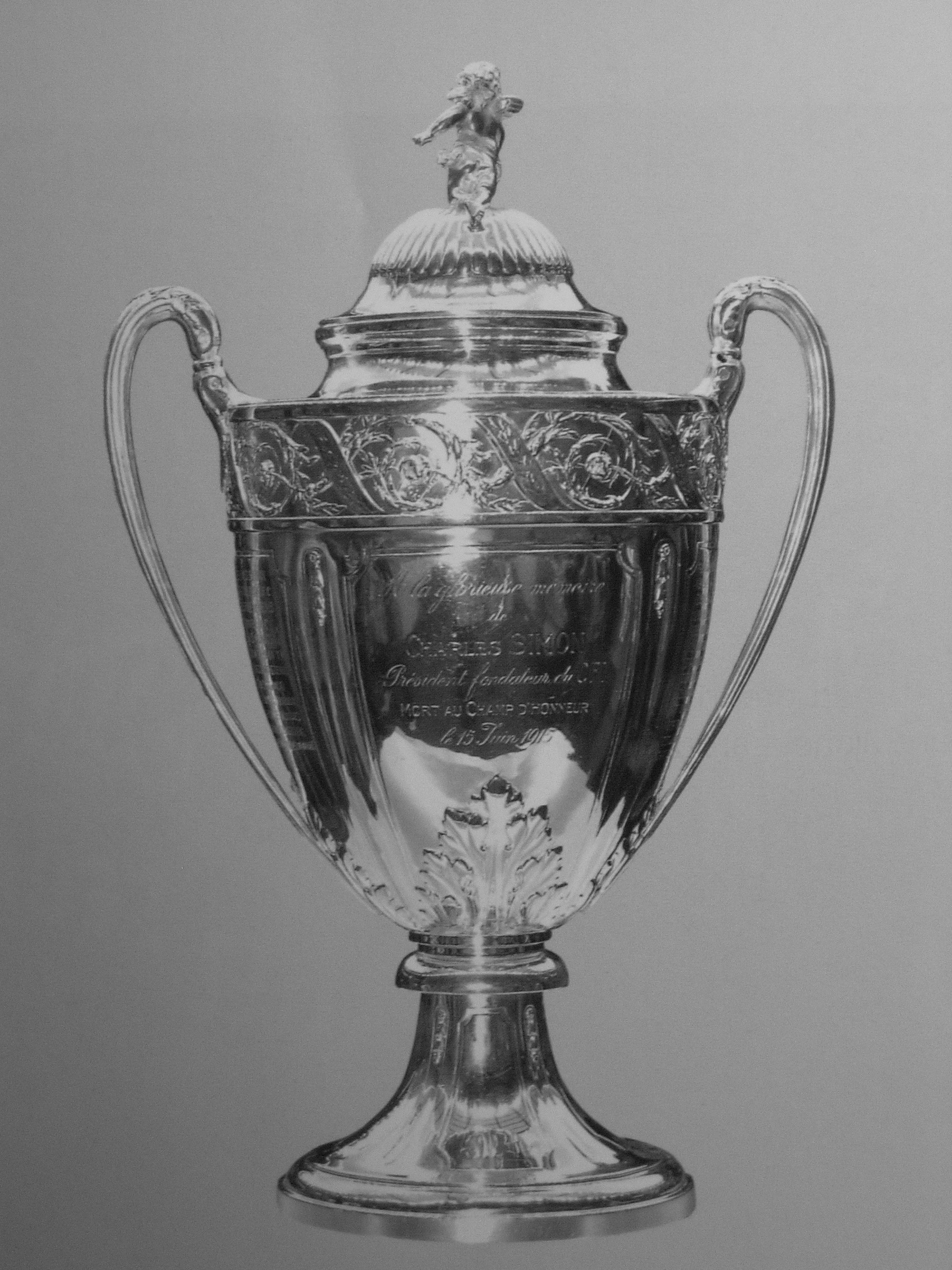
French Football Cup Trophy (Charles Simon Cup).

In 1907, Simon's CFI organized its inaugural championship, the so-called Trophée de France, which pits the champions of each federation that makes up the CFI against each other at the end of the season, and its inaugural edition in 1907 was won by Étoile, the champions of the FGSPF, after claiming an 8–3 victory over the Bordeaux-based FC Simiotin, winners of the Amateur Athletic Federation (FAA), and their reward was a trophy that had been donated by Pierre de Coubertin. All the federations making up the CFI kept their autonomy, so each of them had selectors for the French national team, but in December 1912, after successive mergers between rival federations, the selection committee (SC) of the CFI became composed of 12 members, including Simon, who in May 1909, chose the 11th player for a friendly match against Belgium.

In 1910, Simon took a trip of several months with his friend Louis Raveton, and together, they visited Greece, Asia Minor, Mount Athos, and Constantinople. The CFI gradually received the support of all football defenders, particularly that of Jules Rimet, founder of Red Star, who joined the CFI in 1912 with its LFA. In 1913, the USFSA had to capitulate and request its registration to the CFI, which means that at that time, Simon was the unofficial first president of a French Football Federation (almost, since it lacked the "socialists" of the FSAS).

=== UIOCEP ===
In 1911, at the end of FGSPF's annual competition (this time held in Nancy), which brought together 10,000 gymnasts and 250 flags, Simon, who had ensured the entire organization of this event, was then involved in the International Union of Catholic Works of Physical Education (UIOCEP), of which Michaux was elected vice-president, while Simon became the entity's first General Secretary, and as such, he ensured its balance and operation. It was then agreed that the head office of the UIOCEP would be that of FGSPF, located at Place Saint-Thomas d'Aquin 5, Paris. In December 1911, this union convened in Rome to establish its statutes with the encouragement of Pope Pius XI. Two years later, at the end of 1913, the first General Assembly of the Association of Athletes was held in Rome.

== Musical and writing career ==
His artistic sensitivity was heightened by listening to religious music, particularly ancient chants from the time of the cathedrals. In 1906, he participated with 6 friends in the creation of the Manécanterie des Petits Chanteurs à la Croix de Bois, a children's choir to revive the love of Gregorian chants, which was established in the 15th arrondissement; each member contributed 20 francs per quarter. The first rehearsal took place on 10 January 1907 and the first concert on 18 July 1907 at the Catholic Institute.

Nature inspired him to write poems, and in 1912, his first collection, La Flûte enguirlandée, was published by Jouve, as well as two plays in verse, Pierrots de France, a fairy tale, and L'Hôtellerie du Pot d'Etain, a comedy, completed in 1914 and which were to be performed in two Parisian theaters, but the outbreak of the First World War interrupted these projects.

== Military career and death ==
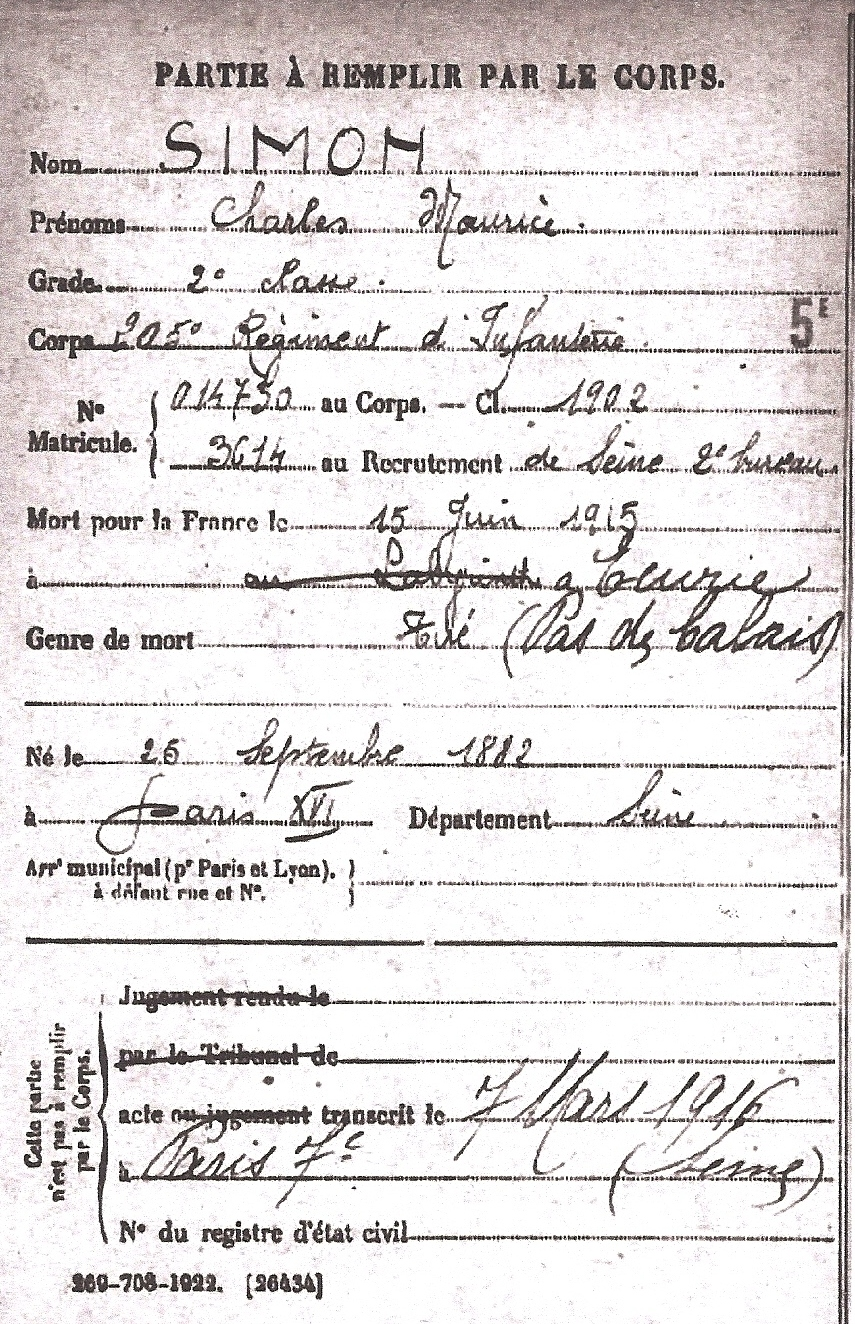
Death certificate of Charles Simon, who died for France in Écurie in 1915.

On 2 August 1914, Simon was mobilized in the 28th Infantry Regiment and joined Évreux as a sergeant. The troops were quickly sent by train to occupied Belgium, and the regiment took up position on the Sambre before it repositioned itself near Guise where it was ordered to prevent the enemy from crossing the bridges. This regiment experienced uninterrupted bombardments before the bloody hand-to-hand combat to defend every inch of ground. In September, he took part in the First Battle of the Marne, remaining there for four months in the Maricourt sector, training in trench warfare.

On 22 April 1915, he was recalled to the rear to rest before the Second Battle of Artois, during which many died; on 15 May alone, the 28th Regiment lost a sixth of its personnel on the outskirts of Aix-Noulette. On 26 May, the 28th regiment lost 848 men and 21 officers, including half of the 6th company, that of Simon, who was not among the soldiers who returned from a two-hour long hand-to-hand fight in the trenches that ended with the French retreating, overwhelmed by the number of German soldiers who were receiving reinforcement. Following an investigation into the circumstances of his disappearance in 1920, the Army awarded him a decoration, convinced that he was "killed by the enemy".

However, Simon had survived and then became a soldier in the 205th infantry regiment, registration number 3614, and was killed by bullets at Écurie, Pas-de-Calais, just two weeks later, on 15 June 1915, a mere three days from the end of the Second Battle of Artois. (Note: Coincidentally, a certain Adam Charles Simon, who was simply known as Charles Simon, died just a week prior, on 7 June 1915.) The transcription of his death took place in the 7th arrondissement of Paris. On 18 July, a gathering of civil and religious authorities attended the ceremony organized by the FGSPF in the Saint-Thomas-d'Aquin church where the band of the Union athlétique du chantier sounded the service in front of the flags of more than forty associations, including four from the provinces.

== Legacy ==
The Trophée de France and the FGSPF Football Championship, which had lasted for ten seasons, were interrupted by the war, but in 1916, the CFI relaunched an interfederal tournament on the same model as the Trophée de France, but simply renamed Coupe de France, in which Étoile lost the final 3–0 to Olympique de Pantin. This tournament did not last, however, and was replaced by the 1917–18 Charles Simon Cup, created by the CFI on the initiative of its new secretary general Henri Delaunay, which was named after Simon as a means to honor his memory. Paul Michaux, still the president of the FGSPF, even asked the goldsmith Chobillon for an object of art to honor the memory of his friend Simon. The final of the second edition on 6 April 1919, was refereed by Simon's friend Armand Thibaudeau, who replaced him as the UIOCEP's secretary general.

The CFI was officially renamed the French Football Federation (FFF) on 7 April 1919, with Jules Rimet as president and Henri Delaunay as general secretary.

The participation of the FGSPF in the various competitions organized in the Saint Damase courtyard of the Vatican earned Charles Simon the cross of the Order of St. Sylvester in July 1915, while the military medal was awarded to him posthumously in 1923. Pierre de Coubertin recognized him as "a remarkable organizer as well as an ardent apostle".

== Bibliography ==
- Hervet, Robert (1948). La Fédération Sportive de France (1898-1948) (in French). Paris: Henriot et Guyot. OCLC 66302325.
- Jouaret, Jean-Marie (2012). La fédération des sections sportives des patronages catholiques de France (1898-1998) (in French). Paris: L'Harmattan. ISBN 978-2-296-55969-1.
