= French Interfederal Committee =

- Sport: List: Association football; Athletics; Cycling
- Jurisdiction: France
- Abbreviation: FCAF
- Founded: 27 March 1907
- Headquarters: Paris
- Replaced: List: FFF (Football); FAF (Athletics)
- Closure date: 1919; 106 years ago

The French Interfederal Committee (French: Comité français interfédéral, CFI) is the direct ancestor of the French Football Federation (FFF), founded in 1919 by the transformation of the said committee.

== History ==
The first governing body of football in France was the USFSA, which was the country's sports governing body, founded in November 1890. The USFSA only managed amateur sports, so not boxing or cycling, which had the Union Vélocipédique de France (UVF). However, some UVF clubs founded sports sections other than cycling, and as a result, they left this federation and founded the French Amateur Cycling Federation (FCAF) in 1905, which had a football department. As for the professionals, there was the Federation of Athletic Societies of France, which changed its name to Federation of Professional Athletic Societies of France (FSAPF) in 1906. Furthermore, a myriad of federations appeared in regions that did not want to depend on Paris, which was so far away, such as FASO in the South-West. This disorder did not bother anyone because it was freedom in diversity, but then FIFA was founded and it stipulated that only one federation is recognized per country, so the USFSA joins FIFA and declares war on patronage.

In response, Charles Simon, general secretary of the Gymnastic and Sports Federation of French Patronages (FGSPF), founds the French Interfederal Committee (CFI) on 23 March 1907. The excluded federations regroup under the banner of the CFI, which was able to bring together, without making them disappear, all the federations managing football in France, except for the USFSA and the FSAPF, thus becoming a superstructure grouping FGSPF, FCAF, and the LFA, plus other regional federations, such as the Lyon and South-East Cycling and Athletics Federation (FCALSE), exceeding 400 members. The CFI was then seen as a rival organization to the USFSA due to the organization's constantly disagreeing with each other, mainly due to the latter's opposition to professionalism in sport. However, it was the USFSA who was on the right track, but then made a huge mistake: it slammed the door on FIFA in 1908. The CFI, on the lookout, rushed to take the vacated place, thus becoming France's sole federation recognized by FIFA. In 1912, the CFI made the strategic decision to focus exclusively on association football. The headquarters of the CFI remained at the same location as the FGSPF: 5 Place Saint-Thomas-d'Aquin in Paris.

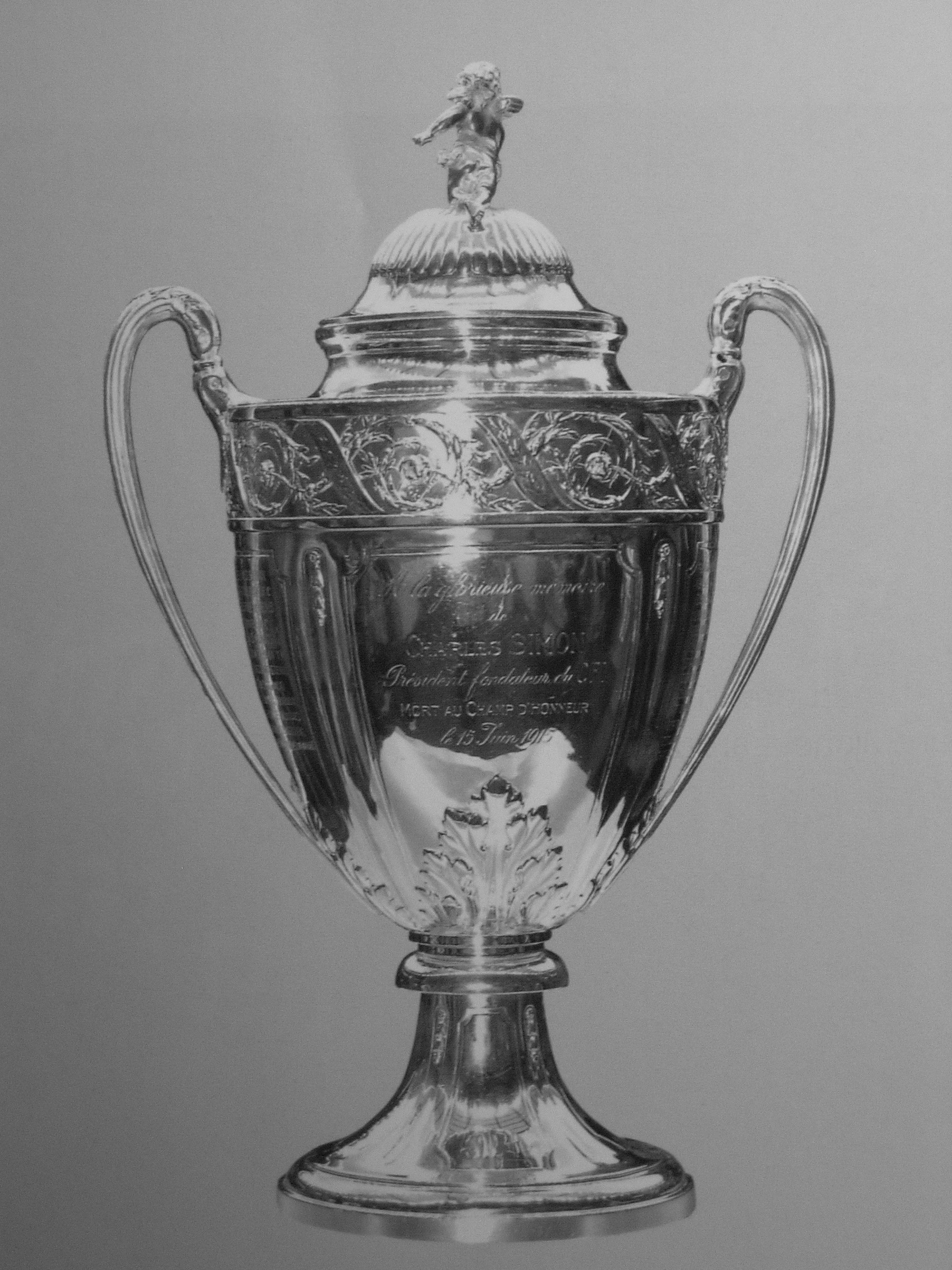
French Football Cup Trophy (Charles Simon Cup).

In 1907, the CFI organized its inaugural championship, the so-called Trophée de France, which featured a trophy donated by Pierre de Coubertin himself. Following the debacle at the 1908 Summer Olympics, in which France sent two teams, one controlled by the USFSA and another by FIFA, the CFI ruled that FIFA would now be responsible for the club's appearances in forthcoming Olympic Games and not the USFSA. Being a founding member of the International Olympic Committee (IOC), the USFSA disagreed with the ruling and, despite having three years to reach an agreement, the CFI and the USFSA failed to, which led to France not sending a football team to the 1912 Summer Olympics. The USFSA later developed friction with FIFA and the IOC, which led to disorganization, and in 1913, it was forced to take the humiliating step of applying for admission to the CFI, becoming semi-affiliated with it. All the federations making up the CFI kept their autonomy, so each of them had three selectors for a total of 12 selectors for the French national team.

The CFI gradually received the support of all football defenders and particularly that of Jules Rimet of Red Star, founder of the LFA (1910), who had joined the CFI in 1912. On 15 June 1915, Charles Simon passed away while on duty, and Henri Delaunay took over his responsibilities at the FGSPF and the CFI. The Trophée de France stopped that year but a similar competition was organized in 1916, under the name of Coupe de France, which was itself replaced by the 1917–18 Charles Simon Cup, created by the CFI in honor of the fallen hero. The CFI was officially renamed the French Football Federation (FFF) on 7 April 1919, with Jules Rimet as president and Henri Delaunay as general secretary. The agreement between CFI, USFSA, FCAF, and LFA was made because each federation had "recognized that the sport of football had nothing to gain from seeing its efforts dispersed among four federations that were tearing each other apart".

== Bibliography ==
- Groeninger, Fabien (2004). Sport, religion et nation, la fédération des patronages d'une guerre mondiale à l'autre (in French). Paris: L’Harmattan. ISBN 2-7475-6950-0.
- Hervet, Robert (1948). La Fédération Sportive de France (1898-1948) (in French). Paris: Henriot et Guyot. OCLC 66302325.
- Jouaret, Jean-Marie (2012). La fédération des sections sportives des patronages catholiques de France (1898-1998) (in French). Paris: L'Harmattan. ISBN 978-2-296-55969-1.
