= René Scheibenstock =

French footballer and manager

Personal information
- Date of birth: 20 September 1891
- Place of birth: Le Locle, Canton of Neuchâtel, Switzerland
- Date of death: 14 February 1966 (aged 74)
- Place of death: Mohammedia, Morocco
- Position: Forward

Senior career*
| Years | Team | Apps | (Gls) |
| 1908–1915 | SH de Marseille | | |
| 1915–1925 | Olympique de Marseille | | |
| 1925–1926 | Olympique de Marseille (reserve) | 3 | (3) |
| 1926–1927 | Olympique de Marseille | | |

Managerial career
- 1927–1928: Olympique de Marseille
- * Club domestic league appearances and goals

René Scheibenstock (20 September 1891 – 14 February 1966) was a French footballer who played as a forward for Stade Helvétique de Marseille and Olympique de Marseille in the 1910s and 1920s, His brothers Andreas, Charley, and Henri are also footballers. serving the latter as a captain and coach.

== Playing career ==
=== Stade Helvétique de Marseille ===
Born on 20 September 1891 in Le Locle, Canton of Neuchâtel, his family moved to Marseille at the turn of the century, where his older brothers founded Stade Helvétique, a sports club of Swiss and English immigrants.

Together with the Hattenschwyler brothers (Henri and Albert), Ernest Utiger, and William Widdington, the Scheibenstock brothers played a crucial role in the Helvétique team that won six consecutive Littoral championships from 1909 to 1914, three of which with a 100%-winning record (1910–12), and these victories qualified the club for the USFSA national championship, where it reached four finals and won three titles in 1909, 1911, and 1913, thus becoming Marseille's flagship club in the early 1910s. On 1 May 1910, he started as a forward in the 1910 USFSA national final, doing so alongside his older brother Andreas (defender); Helvétique lost 7–2 to US Tourquennoise. In order to distinguish the brothers, the French newspaper L'Auto (the forerunner of L'Équipe) refers to him as Scheibenstock II, probably due to being the youngest of the brothers.

In the preview of the 1911 USFSA national final, the line-up of SH only mentions one Scheibenstock, the defender, but in the end, both Andreas and René started in the final again, with the latter scoring once to help his side to a 3–2 win over Racing Club de France. On 27 April 1913, he started in the final of the USFSA national final, making some "nice runs and crosses" to help his side to a 1–0 win over FC Rouen.

The 1913–14 Littoral Championship was only decided on the last matchday, which pitted Helvétique against its main rival OM, and it was Scheibenstock who scored a late winner to seal a 3–2 victory, thus being declared the Littoral champion for the sixth consecutive time.

=== Olympique de Marseille ===
In 1914, Stade Helvétique had to close its doors due to a lack of opponents, since all of them had been mobilized on the front during the outbreak of the First World War, with the club eventually ceasing all activity in 1916. Their biggest rivals, Olympique Marseille, took advantage of its dissolution to incorporate several of the club's most prominent players, such as Marcel Vanco and three of the Scheibenstock brothers.

Charley, Henri, and especially René played a crucial role in helping OM win back-to-back regional championships in 1918 and 1919 (Littoral and Provence), and reaching the 1919 USFSA Coupe final; however, René missed the latter due to injury, and without him, OM lost 4–1 to Le Havre. On 10 August 1919, he participated in the constitutive assembly that approved the foundation of the Ligue de Provence.

Scheibenstock stayed loyal to OM for over a decade, from 1915 to 1927, scoring 26 goals in 76 official matches, as well as three goals in three matches for OM's reserve team. During this period, Scheibenstock became the captain of the first team, then coach in the 1927–28 season, and finally as president of the club's football committee.

== Later life ==
In November 1925, the French newspaper Le Miroir des sports stated that one of the Scheibenstock brothers who won the championship with SH de Marseille was now employed in a trading house in Marseille.

== Death ==
Scheibenstock died in Mohammedia, Morocco, on 14 February 1966, at the age of 74.

== Honours ==
SH de Marseille

- Littoral Championship:
  - Champions (6): 1909, 1910, 1911, 1912, 1913, and 1914
- USFSA Football Championship:
  - Champions (2): 1911, and 1913
  - Runner-up (1): 1910

Olympique de Marseille

- Littoral Championship:
  - Champions (1): 1918
- Provence Championship:
  - Champions (2): 1919 and 1921
- USFSA Coupe:
  - Runner-up (1): 1909
