= Andreas Scheibenstock =

French footballer

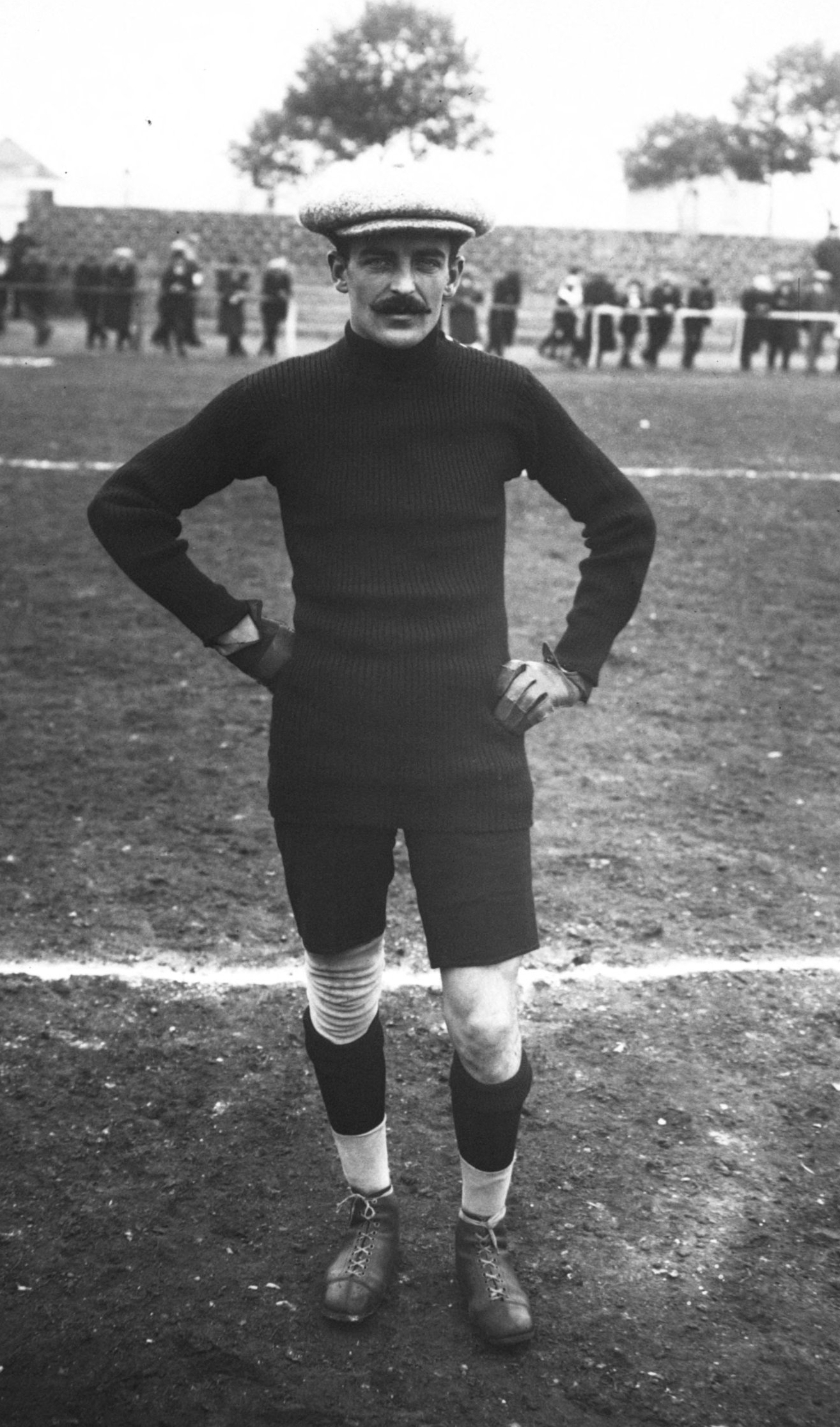
- Scheibenstock in 1913

Personal information
- Place of birth: Le Locle, Canton of Neuchâtel, Switzerland
- Date of death: Unknown
- Positions: Goalkeeper; defender

Senior career*
Years	Team	Apps	(Gls)
1908–1912	SH de Marseille		
1912–1913	CA Paris		
- * Club domestic league appearances and goals

Andreas Scheibenstock was a French footballer who played initially as a goalkeeper and later as a defender for Stade Helvétique de Marseille and CA Paris in the early 1910s. His brothers René, Charley, and Henri are also footballers.

== Playing career ==
Like so many other Swiss living in Marseille, the Scheibenstock brothers were members of the Cercle helvétique, which at the start of the century had around 130 and 160 members, who would meet there to read newspapers, play billiards, or organize parties, but on 22 July 1904, a group of young sports enthusiasts, including the Scheibenstock, founded the football section, which could only field 7 to 9 players during its first years of existence. Although it was formed in 1904, it was not until 6 November 1907 that the name Stade Helvétique was adopted and officially declared in the prefecture.

Together with the Hattenschwyler brothers (Henri and Albert), Ernest Utiger, and William Widdington, the Scheibenstock brothers played a crucial role in the Helvétique team that won six consecutive Littoral championships from 1909 to 1914, which allowed them to compete in the USFSA national championship, reaching four finals and winning three titles in 1909, 1911, and 1913, thus becoming Marseille's flagship club in the early 1910s. He was the team's starting goalkeeper in the 1909 final, helping his side to a 3–2 win over CA Paris, which marked the first time that a club from Marseille defeated a Parisian club. The journalists of the French newspaper L'Auto (the forerunner of L'Équipe) stated that he "made some very sure saves, but he was also served by a remarkable luck".

Despite these encouraging first titles with Helvétique, some "four or five of its best players" decided to leave the club, such as the left winger Glür and the centre-half Kramer, which forced them "to play their ex-goalkeeper Sherbenstock" as a full-back, starting as such in the 1910 USFSA national final, which ended in a 7–2 loss to US Tourquennoise on 1 May. He started this final alongside one of his brothers, who played as a forward (René), and in order to distinguish them, L'Auto refers to him as Scheibenstock I, probably due to being the oldest of the brothers.

In the preview of the 1911 USFSA national final, the line-up of SH only mentions one Scheibenstock, the defender, but in the end, both Andreas and René started in the final again, helping their side to a 3–2 win over Racing Club de France. Some sources state that his brother Henri was the one who started as a defender in this match, which is untrue, since Henri was a midfielder and only 17 at the time. In 1912, he left Helvétique to join CA Paris.

== Later life ==
In November 1925, the French newspaper Le Miroir des sports stated that SH de Marseille's "first Scheibenstock" was working as a restaurateur.

== Honours ==
SH de Marseille

- Littoral Championship:
  - Champions (4): 1909, 1910, 1911, and 1912
- USFSA Football Championship:
  - Champions (1): 1909 and 1911
  - Runner-up (2): 1910
