= Henri Scheibenstock =

French footballer

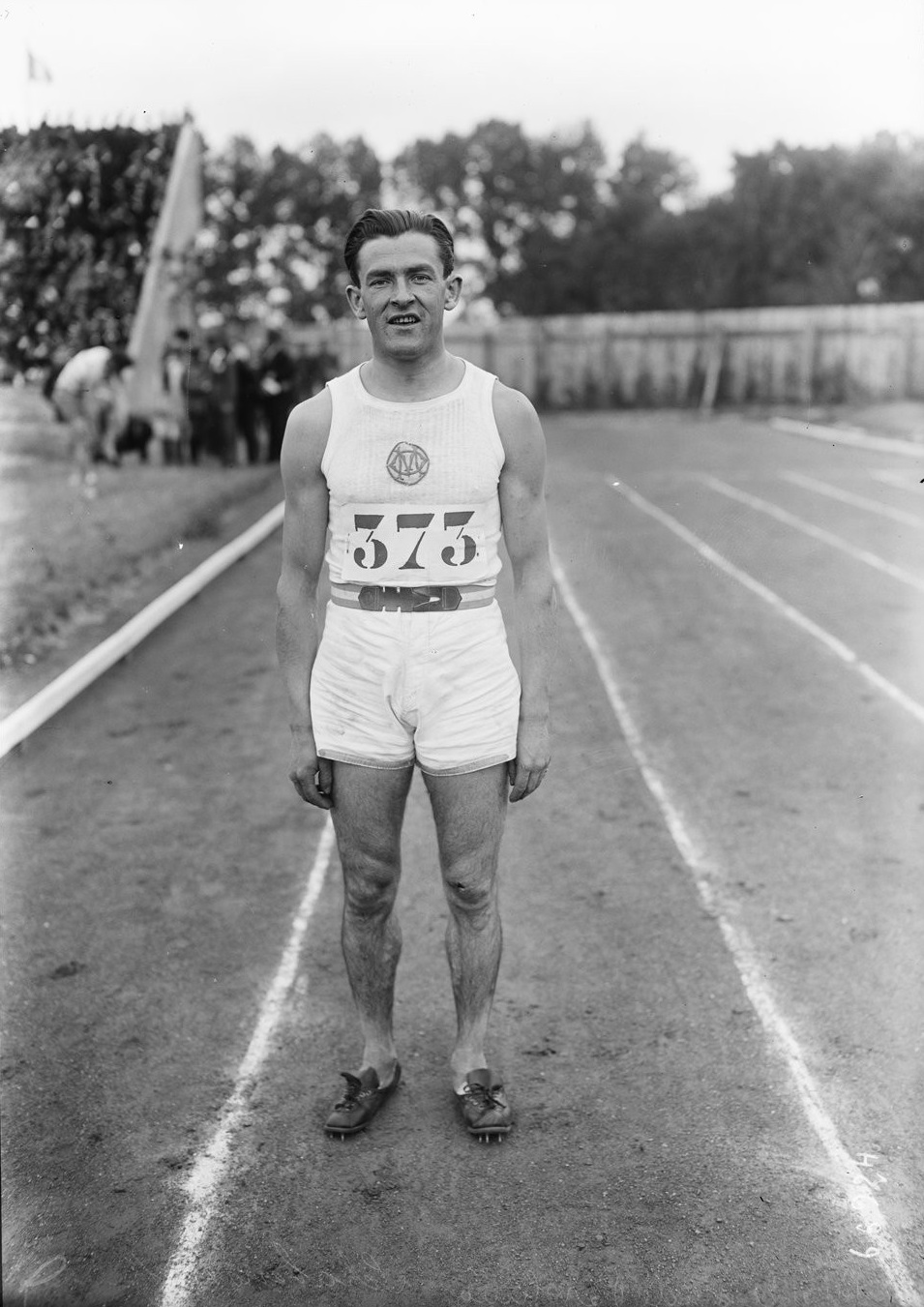
- Scheibenstock in 1921

Personal information
- Date of birth: 24 March 1894
- Place of birth: Le Locle, Canton of Neuchâtel, Switzerland
- Date of death: 8 May 1978 (aged 84)
- Place of death: Seysses, France
- Position: Midfielder

Senior career*
Years	Team	Apps	(Gls)
1910–1912	SH de Marseille		
1912–1914	Servette		
1914–1916	SH de Marseille		
1917–1923	Olympique de Marseille		
- * Club domestic league appearances and goals

Henri Scheibenstock (24 March 1894 – 8 May 1978) was a French footballer who played as a midfielder for SH de Marseille and Olympique de Marseille. His brothers Andreas, Charley, and René are also footballers.

== Playing career ==
Born on 24 March 1894 in Le Locle, Canton of Neuchâtel, his family moved to Marseille at the turn of the century, where his older brothers founded Stade Helvétique, a sports club of Swiss and English immigrants.

Together with the Hattenschwyler brothers (Henri and Albert), Ernest Utiger, and William Widdington, the Scheibenstock brothers played a crucial role in the Helvétique team that won six consecutive Littoral championships from 1909 to 1914, three of which with a 100%-winning record (1910–12), and these victories qualified the club for the USFSA national championship, where it reached four finals and won three titles in 1909, 1911, and 1913, thus becoming Marseille's flagship club in the early 1910s. However, he played a small role in these triumphs, as he constantly stayed on the sidelines, probably due to still being a teenager at the time, and thus having a weaker build than his older brothers. In the 1911 final against Racing Club de France (3–2), Helvétique started his brothers Andreas as a defender and René as a forward; however, some sources state that the defensive Scheibenstock was Henri, which is untrue, since Henri was a midfielder and only 17 at the time.

In 1912, Scheibenstock decided to return to his home country, where he reunited with his older brother Jean, who was licensed at Servette, and on 24 August 1913, the Scheibenstock brothers represented Servette at the 1913 Swiss athletics championships held in Geneva, in which Jean broke the Swiss pole vault record by three centimeters (2.88m), while Henri won the 110 meters hurdles with 18,2 seconds, doing so without knocking any hurdle down.

In mid-1914, Henri returned to Marseille, but just a few months later, Stade Helvétique had to close its doors due to a lack of opponents, since all of them had been mobilized on the front during the outbreak of the First World War, with the club eventually ceasing all activity in 1916. Their biggest rivals, Olympique Marseille, took advantage of its dissolution to incorporate several of the club's most prominent players, such as Marcel Vanco and three of the Scheibenstock brothers.

Charley, Henri, and especially René played a crucial role in helping OM win back-to-back regional championships in 1918 and 1919 (Littoral and Provence), and reaching the 1919 USFSA Coupe final, which ended in a 4–1 loss to Le Havre. Scheibenstock stayed loyal to OM for six years, from 1917 to 1923, scoring 8 goals in 49 official matches.

On 19 June 1921, Scheibenstock was a runner for OM in an athletics tournament held at Stade Pershing. On 14 and 16 July 1922, Scheibenstock participated in OM's international athletics meeting.

== Death ==
Scheibenstock died in Seysses on 8 May 1978, at the age of 84.

== Honours ==
SH de Marseille

- Littoral Championship:
  - Champions (4): 1911, 1912, 1913, and 1914

Olympique de Marseille

- Littoral Championship:
  - Champions (1): 1918
- Provence Championship:
  - Champions (2): 1919 and 1921
- USFSA Coupe:
  - Runner-up (1): 1909
