= Charley Scheibenstock =

French footballer (1886–1973)

Personal information
- Date of birth: 5 June 1886
- Place of birth: Le Locle, Canton of Neuchâtel, Switzerland
- Date of death: 18 October 1973 (aged 87)
- Position: Defender

Senior career*
Years	Team	Apps	(Gls)
1904–1915	SH de Marseille		
1915–1921	Olympique de Marseille		
- * Club domestic league appearances and goals

Charley Scheibenstock (5 June 1886 – 18 October 1973) was a French footballer who played as a defender for SH de Marseille and Olympique de Marseille. His brothers René, Andreas, and Henri are also footballers.

== Career ==
Like so many other Swiss living in Marseille, the Scheibenstock brothers were members of the Cercle helvétique, which at the start of the century had around 130 and 160 members, who would meet there to read newspapers, play billiards, or organize parties, but on 22 July 1904, a group of young sports enthusiasts, including the Scheibenstock, founded the football section, which could only field 7 to 9 players during its first years of existence. Although it was formed in 1904, it was not until 6 November 1907 that the name Stade Helvétique was adopted and officially declared in the prefecture.

Together with the Hattenschwyler brothers (Henri and Albert), Ernest Utiger, and William Widdington, the Scheibenstock brothers played a crucial role in the Helvétique team that won six consecutive Littoral championships from 1909 to 1914, three of which with a 100%-winning record (1910–12), and these victories qualified the club for the USFSA national championship, where it reached four finals and won three titles in 1909, 1911, and 1913, thus becoming Marseille's flagship club in the early 1910s. However, he played a small role in these triumphs, as he constantly stayed on the sidelines as his brothers played the final, including in 1909, in which the 23-year-old Charley witnessed his side achieve a 3–2 win over CA Paris, which marked the first time that a club from Marseille defeated a Parisian club.

In 1914, Stade Helvétique had to close its doors due to a lack of opponents, since all of them had been mobilized on the front during the outbreak of the First World War, with the club eventually ceasing all activity in 1916. Their biggest rivals, Olympique Marseille, took advantage of its dissolution to incorporate several of the club's most prominent players, such as Marcel Vanco and three of the Scheibenstock brothers.

Charley, Henri, and especially René played a crucial role in helping OM win back-to-back regional championships in 1918 and 1919 (Littoral and Provence), and reaching the 1919 USFSA Coupe final, in which he scored an own goal in an eventual 4–1 loss to Le Havre. Scheibenstock stayed loyal to OM for six years, from 1915 to 1921, scoring 3 goals in 21 official matches.

== Honours ==
SH de Marseille

- Littoral Championship (6): 1909, 1910, 1911, 1912, 1913, 1914

Olympique de Marseille

- Littoral Championship: 1918, 1919
- USFSA Coupe runner-up: 1909
