= William Widdington =

English footballer

Personal information
- Date of birth: unknown
- Place of birth: England
- Date of death: unknown
- Position: Forward

Senior career*
Years	Team	Apps	(Gls)
1908–1914	SH de Marseille		
- * Club domestic league appearances and goals

William Widdington was an English footballer who played as a forward for Stade Helvétique de Marseille in the early 1910s.

== Career ==
At some point between 1904 and 1907, Widdington joined the ranks of Stade Helvétique, a sports club made up of Swiss and English immigrants. On 27 December 1908, he started in the decisive match of the 1908–09 Littoral Championship against city rivals Olympique Marseille, scoring once to seal a 4–1 victory.

Together with the Scheibenstock brothers (Andreas, Charley, Henri, and René) and the Hattenschwyler brothers (Henri and Albert), Widdington played a crucial role in the Helvétique team that won six consecutive Littoral championships from 1909 to 1914, which qualified the club for the USFSA national championship, where it reached four finals and won three titles in 1909, 1911, and 1913, thus becoming Marseille's flagship club in the early 1910s. On 25 April 1909, he started in the 1909 USFSA national final, scoring twice to help his side to a 3–2 comeback victory over CA Paris, which marked the first time that a club from Marseille defeated a Parisian club. The following day, the journalists of the French newspaper L'Auto (currently known as L'Équipe) described him as "an excellent dribbler and good shooter". The following year, on 1 May, he started in the 1910 USFSA national final, hitting the woodwork in an eventual 7–2 loss.

On 27 April 1913, Widdington started in the USFSA national final in Rouen, helping his side to a 1–0 win over FC Rouen despite "placing a magnificent shot which grazes the post" and having an header narrowly saved by Maurice Cousinard. The following the journalists of L'Auto described him as the team's best forward, "who knows how to get rid of the ball at the right time; he lacks a shot without which he would be perfect. The 1913–14 Littoral Championship was only decided on the last matchday, which pitted Helvétique against its main rival OM, and it was Widdington who scored a late equalizer in an eventual 3–2 victory, thus being declared the Littoral champion for the sixth consecutive time.

== Death ==
Widdington was killed in World War I.

== Honours ==
SH de Marseille

- Littoral Championship:
  - Champions (6): 1909, 1910, 1911, 1912, 1913, and 1914
- USFSA Football Championship:
  - Champions (2): 1911, and 1913
  - Runner-up (1): 1910

== Bibliography ==
- Castagno, Gilles (2011). Olympique de Marseille: Histoire encyclopédique (1900-1939) [Olympique de Marseille: Encyclopedic History (1900-1939)] (in French). Paris: Beau livre. p. 700. ISBN 978-2-954-00230-9.
