= Scheibenstock =

Scheibenstock is a Swiss surname. Notable people with the surname include:

- Andreas Scheibenstock, Swiss footballer
- Charley Scheibenstock (1886–1973), Swiss footballer
- Henri Scheibenstock (1894–1978), Swiss footballer
- René Scheibenstock (1891–1966), Swiss footballer
