= Maurice Baudier =

French footballer (1897–1932)

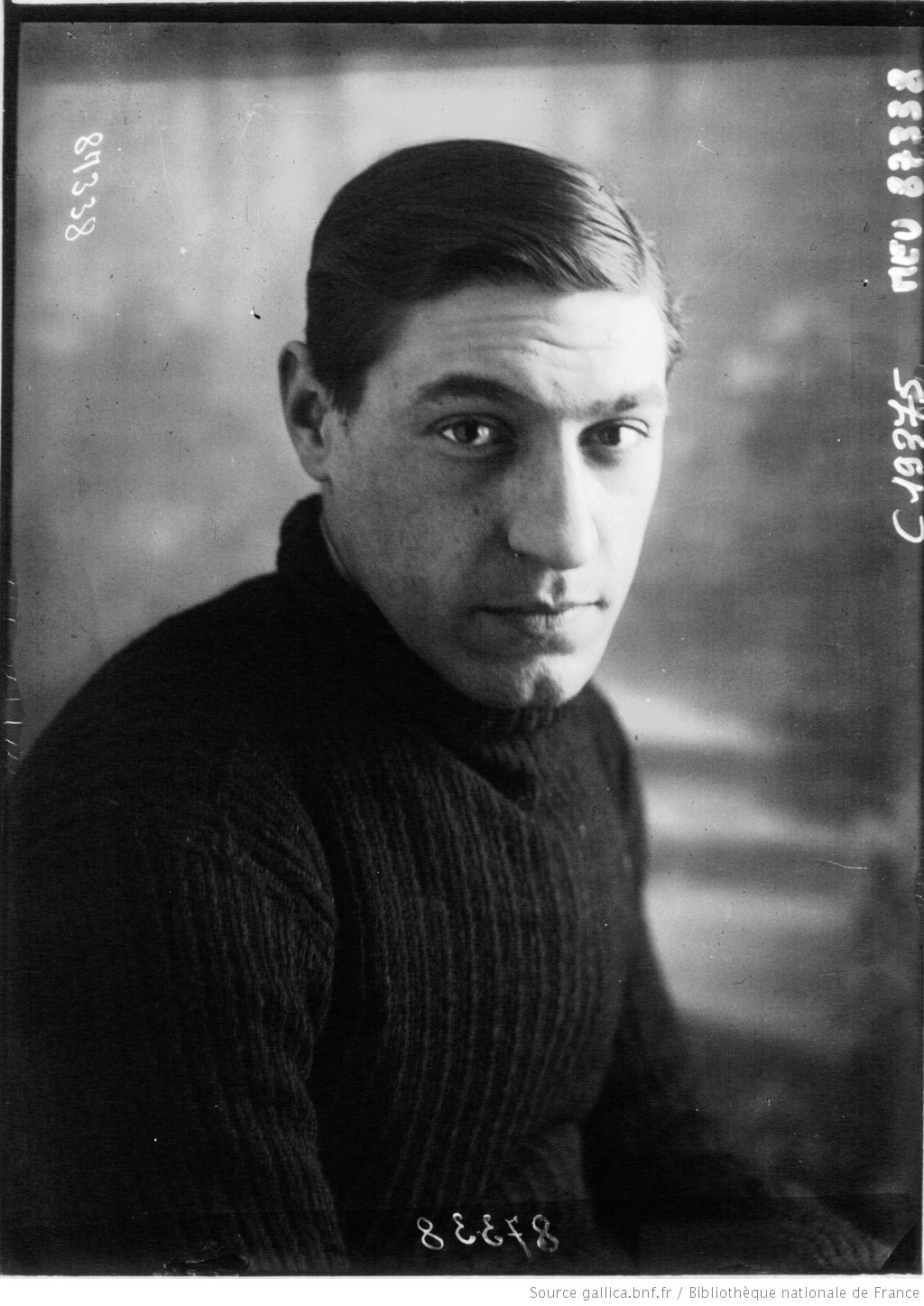
- Baudier in 1921

Personal information
- Full name: Maurice Camille Baudier
- Date of birth: 22 July 1897
- Place of birth: Avallon, Yonne, France
- Date of death: 21 March 1932 (aged 34)
- Place of death: 6th arrondissement of Paris, France
- Height: 1.61 m (5 ft 3 in)
- Position: Goalkeeper

Senior career*
Years	Team	Apps	(Gls)
1918–1922	CA Paris		

International career
1921	France	3	(0)
- * Club domestic league appearances and goals

Maurice Camille Baudier (22 July 1897 – 21 March 1932), sometimes incorrectly spelled as Maurice Beaudier, was a French footballer who played as a goalkeeper for CA Paris and the French national team in the 1920s.

He is the father of Jacques Baudier, a medal-winning athlete in the veterans categories, and an international sports judge.

== Early life ==
Born in Avallon, Yonne, on 22 July 1897, (Note: Some sources wrongly state that he was born on 1 January 1897.) Baudier fought in the First World War and received the War cross for his courage. In 1917, at the age of 20, Baudier was poisoned by trench gas and was 20% disabled in the lungs.

== Club career ==
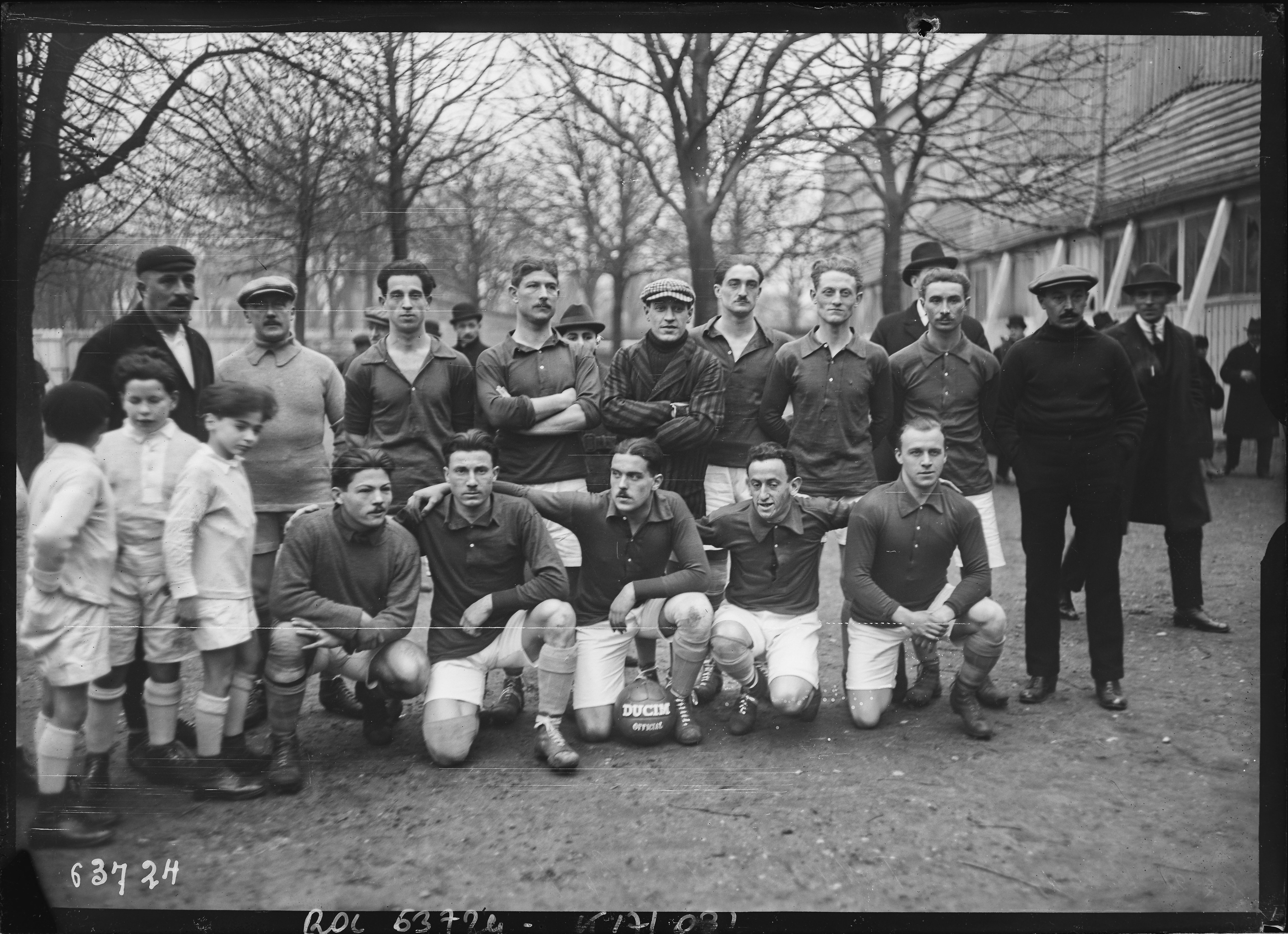
Baudier (standing in the center with his cap) with the French team at the Parc des Princes in 1921.

After the War ended in 1918, Baudier joined the ranks of CA Paris, and even though he was small for a goalkeeper (1,61 meters), he made up for it with his exceptional agility and sharp reflexes, being especially effective on low shots close to the ground.

Together with Marcel Vanco, Louis Mesnier, and Henri Bard, he was a member of the CA Paris team that won the Coupe de France in 1920, starting in the semifinals against VGA Médoc on 11 April 1920, in which he allowed the opponents to equalize after "receiving the ball badly" in an eventual 2–1 win. It was perhaps because of this mistake that he did not start in the final against Le Havre on 9 May, being replaced by the Swiss Ivan Dreyfus.

== International career ==
Baudier earned all of his three international caps for France within 30 days, from 8 February to 6 March 1921, in friendly matches against Ireland, Italy, and Belgium, all of which ending in losses with a total of 7 goals conceded.

== Death ==
He died in a hospital in the 6th arrondissement of Paris on 21 March 1932, at the age of 34.

== Honours ==
CA Paris

- Coupe de France: 1919–20
