= Parc des Princes =

Stadium in Paris, France

- UEFA
- Interactive map of Parc des Princes
- Address: 24 Rue du Commandant Guilbaud
- Location: Paris, France
- Owner: Council of Paris
- Capacity: 47,929
- Record attendance: 50,370 (France vs. Wales, 18 February 1989)

Construction
- Opened: 18 July 1897; 129 years ago
- Expanded: 23 April 1932; 94 years ago
- Demolished: 8 July 1967; 59 years ago
- Rebuilt: 23 April 1972; 54 years ago
- Architects: Roger Taillibert; Siavash Teimouri

Tenant
- Paris Saint-Germain (1974–present)

Website
- Parc des Princes

Le Parc des Princes (French pronunciation: [paʁk de pʁɛ̃s], lit. 'the Park of Princes') is an all-seater football stadium in Paris, France. It is located in the southwest of the French capital, within the 16th arrondissement, directly opposite the Stade Jean-Bouin. The stadium, with a seating capacity of 47,929 spectators, has been the home of French football club Paris Saint-Germain (PSG) since July 1974. The pitch is surrounded by four covered all-seater stands: Tribune Auteuil, Tribune Paris, Tribune Borelli and Tribune Boulogne.

The stadium's surroundings were once a forest that served as a private recreation area and hunting ground for the king's sons (the princes) for centuries, hence the name Parc des Princes. In 1852, the area was transferred to the Council of Paris. The first Parc was built there in 1897 as a velodrome, hosting prestigious cycling competitions including the Tour de France. Expanded in 1932, the second Parc adopted a more modern design to focus on other sports such as football, rugby union and rugby league.

Instigated by French president Charles de Gaulle and Minister of Sports Maurice Herzog, a project to rebuild the stadium to contemporary standards began on 8 July 1967, under the direction of Roger Taillibert and Siavash Teimouri. Georges Pompidou, who succeeded de Gaulle in 1969, officially inaugurated the stadium on 4 June 1972. The third Parc was one of the most advanced stadiums in Europe at the time, impressing with its futuristic lines, suspended concrete stands and formidable acoustics.

Before the opening of the Stade de France in 1998, the Parc was the home stadium of the France national football team and the France national rugby union team. PSG's record attendance at the Parc dates back to their 2–0 victory over Waterschei in 1983 in the UEFA Cup Winners' Cup in front of 49,575 spectators. The French football team's record attendance at the stadium was set in 1993, when 48,402 spectators watched their 2–1 FIFA World Cup qualification defeat by Bulgaria. However, the 50,370 spectators during French rugby union team's 31–12 victory over Wales in the 1989 Five Nations Championship holds the all-time attendance record at the Parc.

== History ==
=== Inauguration and Tour de France ===
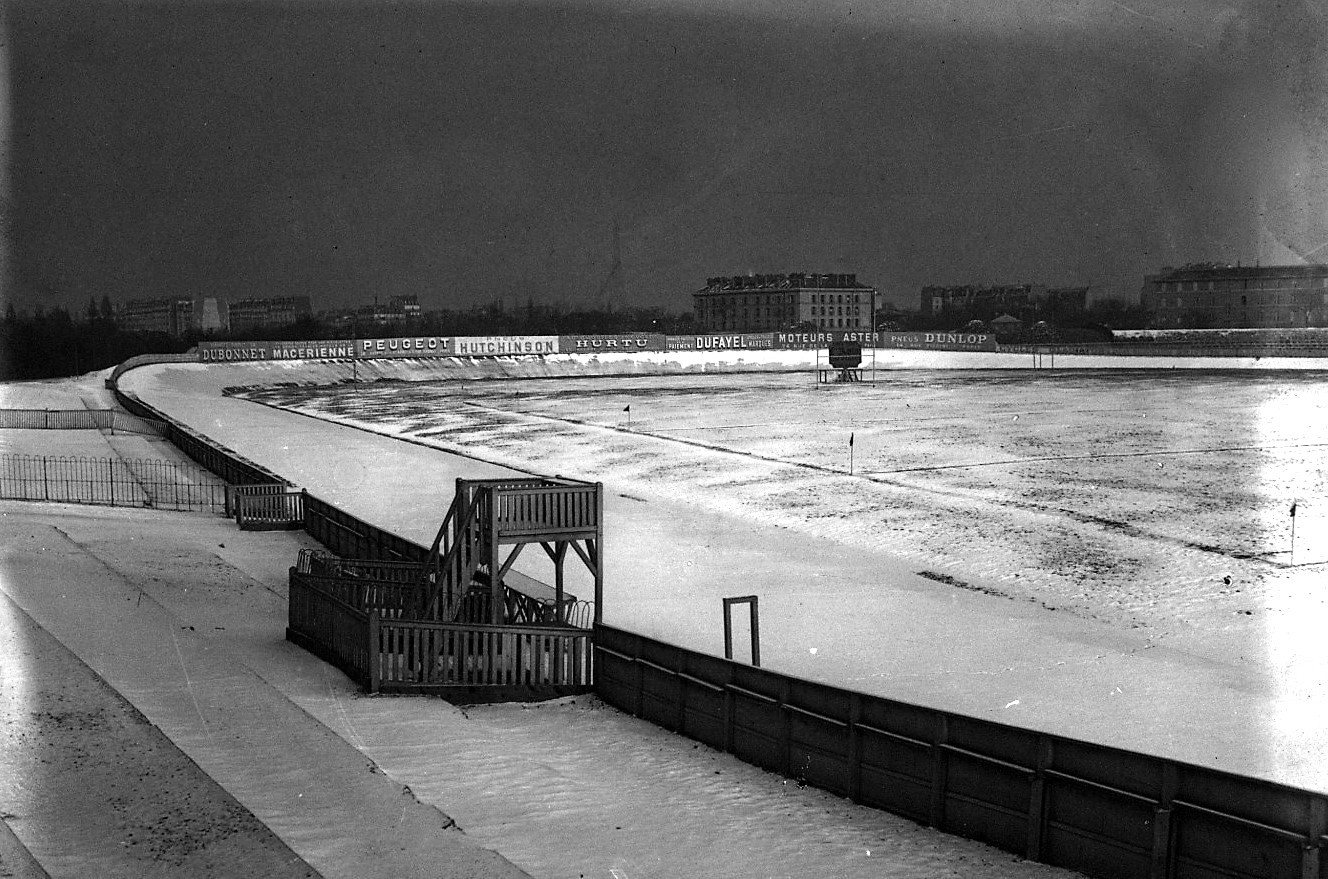
The Parc des Princes in 1908.

For centuries, the French royal family controlled the Forest of Rouvray, today a public park called the Bois de Boulogne, and used it as a private recreation area and hunting ground for the king's sons (the princes). Following the French Revolution of 1789, the area was taken over by the central government. In 1852, upon the declaration of the Second French Empire, Emperor Napoleon III ceded ownership to the Council of Paris. The Parc des Princes was built there on 18 July 1897, hence its name. It is the oldest stadium in Paris.

With a seating capacity for 3,200, the Parc was initially an open-air velodrome for track cycling, the most popular sport in France at the time. Henri Desgrange, a French cyclist and sports journalist, was appointed director of the stadium. The first match was played on 14 November 1897, pitting rugby union teams Union Athlétique of France and Swindon RFC of England. The first football match took place on 26 December 1897. In front of 500 spectators, Club Français won 3–1 against the English Ramblers. In 1899, the Parc hosted its first major cycling event, the Bol d'Or cycle race, followed by the 1900 UCI Track Cycling World Championships. However, the Vélodrome de Vincennes was chosen instead of the Parc to host the 1900 Summer Olympics.

Desgrange and his business partner Victor Goddet, who were making a name for themselves managing the Parc, founded the cycling newspaper L'Auto in 1900 to compete with rival sports magazine Le Vélo. In an attempt to counter the popularity of Le Vélo, Desgrange took up the idea of a colleague, Géo Lefèvre, to organize a large-scale race: the Tour de France. Goddet secured the necessary funding and the first edition of the race was held in July 1903, finishing at the Parc. The Tour was a resounding success and L'Auto dominated the sports press for the next forty years, while Le Vélo ceased publication in November 1904. From 1903 to 1967, the Tour completed its course on the 666-meter-long pink cycle track of the Parc. It also hosted eight further UCI Track Cycling World Championships between 1907 and 1964.

In September 1902, Racing Paris became the Parc's first tenant. A year later, a Parisian team lost 11–0 to their English counterparts in front of 984 spectators in the stadium's first international football match. The France national football team played their first match at the Parc on 12 February 1905, beating Switzerland 1–0. On 1 January 1906, the France national rugby union team played their first official match at the same venue. 10,000 spectators watched France lose 38–8 to the New Zealand All Blacks. Both national sides continued to play regularly there, but their main home stadium was the Stade Yves-du-Manoir until 1972. During the first decade of the 20th century, the Parc also hosted three Top 14 finals, four USFSA Football Championship finals, the 1905 Coupe Dewar final and several Six Nations Championship matches between 1910 and 1920.

The Parc's capacity was increased to 10,000 seats just before World War I. After the war, the stadium hosted its first Coupe de France final in 1919 between CASG Paris and Olympique de Paris in front of 10,000 spectators. In 1922, the Council of Paris refused funding to convert the Parc into an Olympic Stadium for the 1924 Summer Olympics. It was eventually expanded to 20,000 seats, but was still considered too small by the International Olympic Committee. Thanks to funding from Racing, who had moved there from the Parc in 1920, the Yves-du-Manoir was expanded to 60,000 spectators and was thus chosen to host the event.

=== Expansion and 1938 FIFA World Cup ===
Following the Olympic Games, the Council of Paris signed a 40-year concession contract with L'Auto in 1925. Goddet died shortly after, in 1926, and his shares in the newspaper passed to his sons, Jacques and Maurice. Desgrange and the Goddet brothers began a major expansion of the stadium in 1931. Work was completed nine months later on 23 April 1932, with a capacity of 40,000 spectators, including 26,000 seats, and four stands, two of them covered, surrounding the pitch. These were named Tribune Présidentielle (or Tribune L'Auto), Tribune Paris (or Tribune Tour de France), Tribune Auteuil and Tribune Boulogne. However, the length of the velodrome's pink track was reduced from 666 metres to 454.

The second Parc was inaugurated by tenants Red Star with a 4–2 win over Spanish side Athletic Bilbao in a friendly match on 9 October 1932. Racing also moved into the Parc, playing their first Ligue 1 match there on 23 October 1932 against Mulhouse. Stade Français joined Red Star and Racing later that year, and the three clubs shared the stadium until 1966. In rugby union, the Parc hosted France's 1937 FIRA Tournament final victory against Italy and two matches of the 1945–46 Victory Internationals. Several boxing matches were also held at the stadium. The first fight was on 12 June 1932, when French boxer Marcel Thil took the world middleweight title from American Gorilla Jones in front of 70,000 spectators. On 25 May 1946, the Parc hosted six more bouts, including the main event between French boxers Marcel Cerdan and Robert Charron, won by the former.

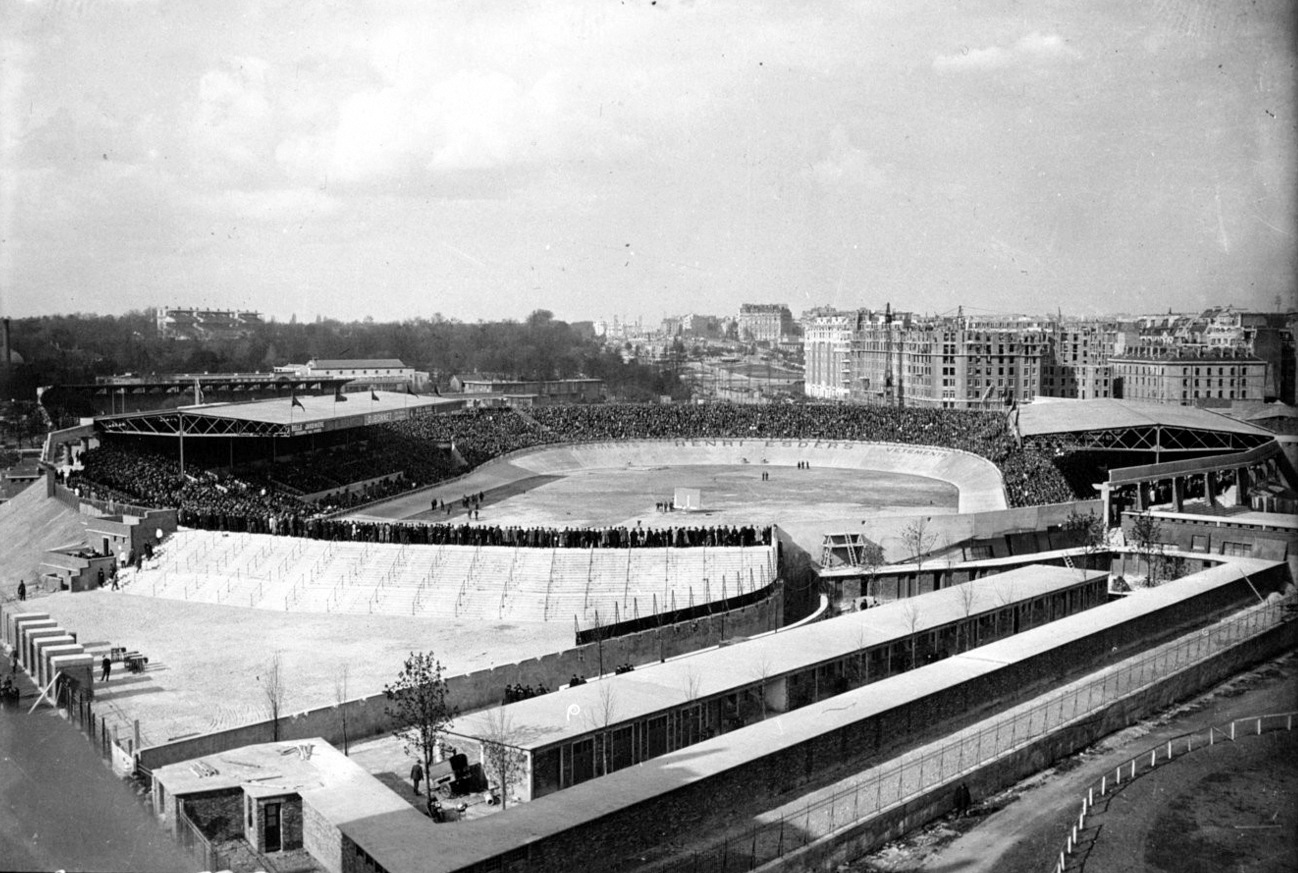
The Parc des Princes in 1932.

1938 was an eventful year for the Parc, beginning with the 1938 Coupe de France final, its second overall. It would again host the deciding match in 1940 and 1944. In June, the 1938 FIFA World Cup became the first major tournament held at the Parc since 1900. The stadium hosted the opening match between Switzerland and Germany, as well as Hungary's semi-final victory over Sweden, but the Yves-du-Manoir remained more important and was the venue for the final. Finally, on 10 December 1938, American soldiers remaining in France after World War I played the first American football game on French soil at the Parc in front of 25,000 spectators.

The 1939 Tour de France marked the last event at the stadium before World War II. It ended shortly before Nazi Germany invaded Poland. Plans were made for a Tour in 1940, and Desgrange hoped to host an American team for the first time, but these plans were put on hold following the German invasion of France. Desgrange died three months later, in August 1940, and full responsibility for L'Auto, the Tour, and the Parc fell to Jacques, his brother Maurice having sold his shares in L'Auto to a group of Nazi-sympathizing businessmen in the late 1930s. During the 1940s, despite the war, the Parc hosted four consecutive Top 14 finals between 1943 and 1946.

Jacques continued publishing during World War II, showing some sympathy for the occupying Germans. Upon the Liberation of France in 1944, he was accused of collaboration, L'Auto was closed, and its assets confiscated by the state. French publishing magnate Émilien Amaury came to his aid, and Jacques avoided jail. With Amaury's help, he eventually gained permission to launch a new sports newspaper, called L'Équipe, in 1946. Amaury also persuaded the authorities to return control of the Parc and the Tour to Jacques through L'Équipe the following year. In return, he had to cede 50% of his shares in L'Équipe to Amaury, who thus became a co-owner of the Tour. Events returned to the Parc soon after, starting with the 1947 Tour de France, the first edition since 1939. The 1948 Tour de France was another highlight; its finish at the Parc des Princes velodrome on 25 July 1948 was the first live television broadcast of the race.

=== First European final and reconstruction ===
The first night football match at the stadium, a friendly between Racing Paris and Brazilian club Bangu, took place on 23 April 1951. Racing lost 3–2. On 26 March 1952, the French Football Federation (FFF) organized the first international outdoor night sporting event. Under 120 floodlights, France lost 1–0 to Sweden at the Parc. The Parc subsequently hosted two Latin Cup in 1952 and 1955, including both finals, in which Spanish teams Barcelona and Real Madrid defeated French sides Nice and Reims. In between, the 1954 Rugby League World Cup final, the inaugural edition of the tournament, was played at the stadium on 13 November 1954. The France national rugby league team lost 16–12 to Great Britain.

The inaugural 1956 European Cup final was also held at the stadium, where Real Madrid again beat Reims on 13 June 1956. During that European campaign, Reims played most of their home matches at the Parc, and continued to do so occasionally until 1963, due to their own stadium being deemed too small. In 1960, France hosted the inaugural UEFA European Championship. The stadium saw Yugoslavia eliminate France in the semi-finals and then fall to the Soviet Union in the final. Between 1953 and 1967, before the stadium was rebuilt, the Parc hosted seven Coupe Charles Drago finals, two Trophée des Champions, the 1965 Coupe de la Ligue final and four Coupe de France finals.

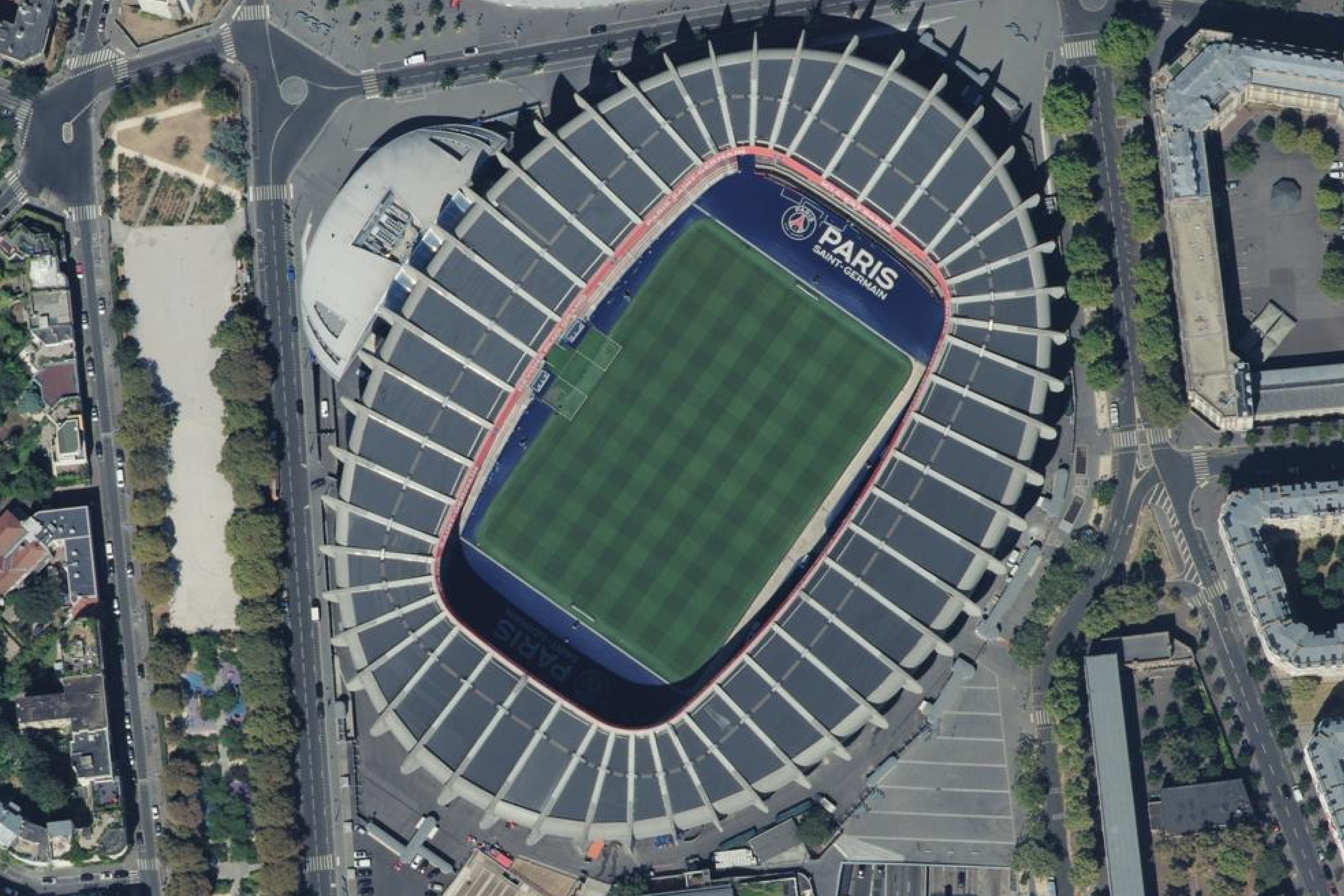
The Parc des Princes in 2018.

French president Charles de Gaulle and Minister of Sports Maurice Herzog pushed through a project to convert the Parc into a joint national football and rugby stadium, adapted to contemporary standards. Pursuing their vision, the Council of Paris did not renew Jacques's lease on the stadium when it expired in 1965. As a result, Jacques ran into financial difficulties that year and sold his remaining 50% shares in L'Équipe to Amaury, who became the owner of the Tour. In 1967, the state gave the green light to a third version of the Parc, with French architect Roger Taillibert chosen to lead the project, working closely with Iranian artist Siavash Teimouri. The 1967 Tour de France was the 54th and last time that the race was run on the Parc's pink track, which ceased to exist following reconstruction.

Demolition began on 8 July 1967 and work was completed on 23 April 1972. However, matches continued to be played there, albeit with reduced attendance, including the 1969 Trophée des Champions and the 1970 Championnat de France Amateur final. The latter, played on 14 June 1970 between Pierrots and Montélimar, was the last match at this second incarnation of the Parc. In a stadium surrounded by cranes, Paul Kohler scored the only goal of the match, giving Pierrots their second consecutive title. The Parc had previously hosted four other Championnat de France Amateur finals between 1965 and 1969.

With a seating capacity for 47,929 spectators and four covered stands, the third Parc impressed with its futuristic lines, suspended concrete stands and formidable acoustics. Equipped with an integrated video and sound system, it was one of the most advanced stadiums in Europe, also being the first to feature rooftop lighting on the continent. The Parc was the largest stadium in France, home to the national football and rugby union teams (1972–1997), the venue of the Coupe de France (1972–1997), the Top 14 (1974–1997) and the Coupe de la Ligue (1995–1997) finals, and hosted the Six Nations (1973–1997), until the construction of the Stade de France.

=== PSG and French national teams ===
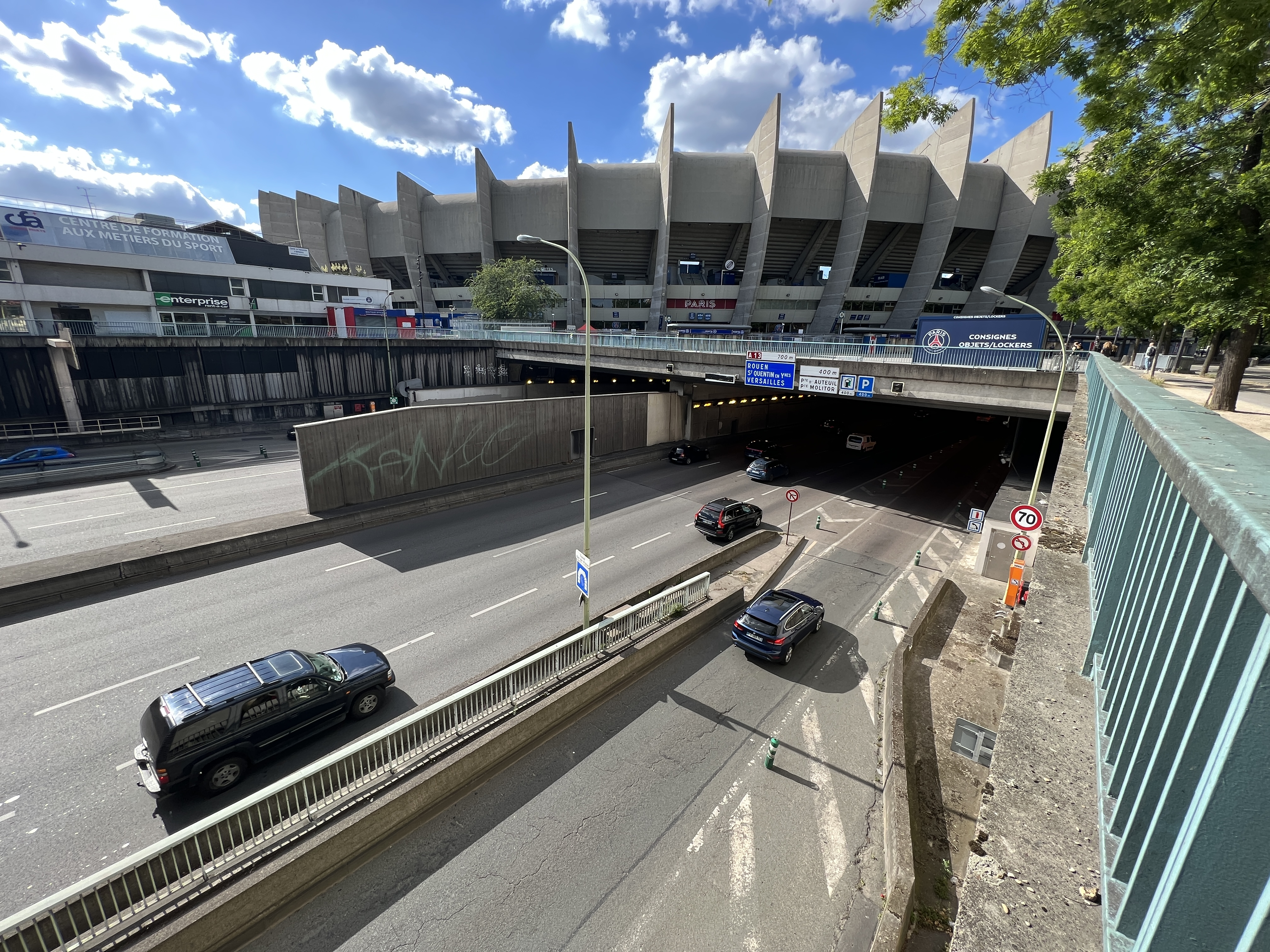
Exterior of the Parc des Princes in 2022.

On 25 May 1972, a friendly between the France Olympic football team and its Soviet counterpart was the first match played at the Parc. France lost 3–1. De Gaulle, who died in November 1970, did not live to see the final result. It was his successor, Georges Pompidou, who officially inaugurated the new national stadium at the 1972 Coupe de France final on 4 June 1972. The first rugby league match at the Parc was Australia's 9–5 victory over New Zealand in the 1972 Rugby League World Cup on 1 November 1972.

With Reims no longer among Europe's elite, Racing Paris and Stade Français both in lower divisions, and Red Star at Stade Bauer, the Parc needed a new tenant. Paris FC, fresh from a bitter split with PSG, took over in 1972. PSG played their first match at the Parc on 10 November 1973. They won 3–1 against Ligue 2 promotion rivals Red Star, with the club's first goal at the stadium being scored by Othniel Dossevi. PSG then won the Ligue 1 promotion play–offs 4–2 against Valenciennes at the Parc on 4 June 1974, coinciding with Paris FC's relegation. They moved to the stadium permanently in July 1974. Paris FC returned to Ligue 1 in 1978, sharing the Parc with PSG before being relegated in 1979. Racing Paris also shared the stadium from 1984 until their relegation from Ligue 1 in 1990. PSG became the Parc's sole tenant in 1997, when both French national teams moved to the Stade de France.

The 1975 European Cup final, played at the current Parc, went down in history as one of the most famous. Bayern Munich clinched the title by defeating Leeds United 2–0 in a highly controversial match. French referee Michel Kitabdjian did not send off Leeds midfielder Terry Yorath after a brutal foul, but also denied Leeds two clear penalties from Bayern captain Franz Beckenbauer and ruled out another goal for a dubious offside. The referee had to stop the game several times before the Germans scored twice in the final 20 minutes. The English fans began setting fire to the stands and throwing seats at the police. Bayern had to cut short their lap of honor. Twenty people were arrested and almost 50 fans and police officers were injured. Two more European finals followed. Anderlecht crushed Austria Wien 4–0 in the 1978 European Cup Winners' Cup final, while Liverpool defeated Real Madrid 1–0 in the 1981 European Cup final. It was also at the Parc that France, led by captain Michel Platini, won their first international title, becoming European champions at Euro 1984 after beating Spain 2–0 in the final.

A year earlier, underdogs had won their first major trophy against Platini's reigning Ligue 1 champions Saint-Étienne in the 1982 Coupe de France final at the Parc, one of the most iconic finals in the tournament's history. Nambatingue Toko opened the scoring for PSG, but Platini forced extra time and then gave Saint-Étienne the lead with his second goal of the night. Saint-Étienne were cruising towards the title when Dominique Rocheteau scored an unexpected equalizer against his former team in the dying seconds of the match. PSG fans invaded the pitch in joy, while PSG president Francis Borelli knelt and kissed the turf. After a 30-minute interruption, Dominique Baratelli saved Saint-Étienne's final attempt and Dominique Bathenay converted the winning penalty. In 1983, PSG beat Waterschei 2–0 at the Parc in the quarter-finals of the Cup Winners' Cup in front of 49,575 spectators, a club record that still stands today.

=== Stade de France and 1998 FIFA World Cup ===
During the 1980s, several major non-sporting events were held at the Parc. Pope John Paul II chose the stadium to celebrate Mass during his first visit to France on 1 June 1980, while French politician Jacques Chirac gave his election speech there for his 1981 presidential bid for the conservative Gaullist party Rally for the Republic (RPR). Towards the end of the decade, it also began hosting concerts, with Michael Jackson being the first to perform at the Parc in 1988 for his Bad World Tour, which attracted 130,000 spectators over two days.

The French rugby union team set the all-time attendance record at the Parc in 1989, when 50,370 spectators watched their 31–12 victory over Wales in the 1989 Five Nations Championship. The stadium also hosted England's iconic 19–10 quarter-final victory over France in the 1991 Rugby World Cup, remembered as one of the greatest and bloodiest matches in rugby history. In 1992, France was named as the host of the 1998 FIFA World Cup, the first on French soil since 1938, and the Stade de France, a new national stadium, was planned for the occasion in Saint-Denis, north of Paris. It was the beginning of the end of the Parc's status as the country's primary venue, although it continued to host several top-flight matches until 1998. PSG even considered moving to the Stade de France, but ultimately decided to stay at the Parc.

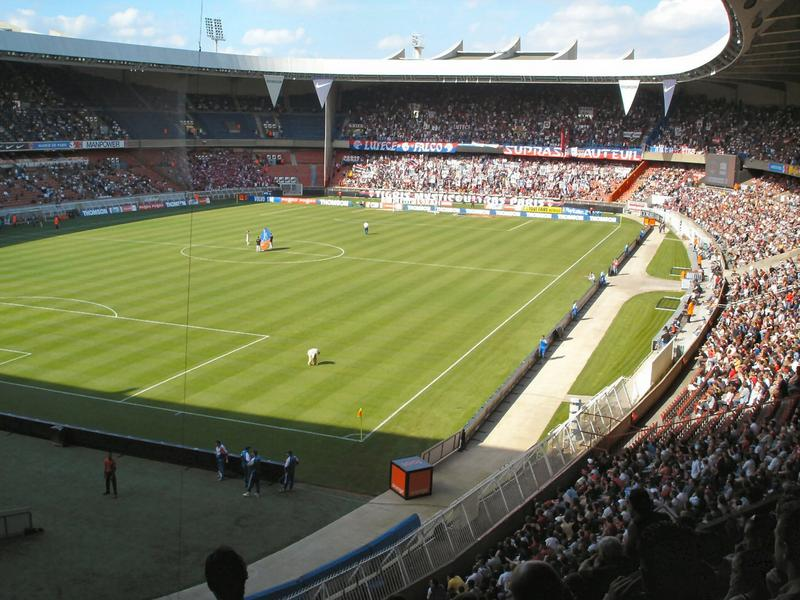
Interior of the Parc des Princes in 2004.

In 1993, French football suffered one of its most painful defeats in front of a team record 48,402 spectators. France needed a draw, while Bulgaria needed to win, to ensure qualification for the 1994 FIFA World Cup in the USA. With the score tied at 1–1 in the dying seconds of the match, French winger David Ginola had the ball by the corner flag. Instead of wasting time and letting the clock run out, he overhit a cross intended for Eric Cantona. The ball was collected by the Bulgarians, who launched a quick counterattack which resulted in Emil Kostadinov scoring the winning goal. France manager Gérard Houllier publicly blamed Ginola for the 2–1 defeat.

Construction of the Stade de France began in May 1995. In the same month, the Parc hosted Real Zaragoza's victory over Arsenal in the 1995 UEFA Cup Winners' Cup final. The stadium witnessed one of PSG's darkest moments in Europe in January 1997, when they were defeated 6–1 by Juventus in the first leg of the 1996 UEFA Super Cup. On 11 June 1997, the French football team drew 2–2 against Italy in the 1997 Tournoi de France in their final match at the Parc. They have returned to the stadium five times, for a total of 132 matches, 127 of them between 1905 and 1997. On 22 November 1997, the French rugby union team were crushed 52–10 by South Africa in their final match at the Parc. They have only played at the stadium once more, in 2007, for a total of 80 matches, 79 of them between 1906 and 1997.

The 81,000-capacity Stade de France opened with a friendly against Spain in January 1998, which France won with a solitary goal from Zinedine Zidane. In May 1998, just days before the start of the FIFA World Cup at the Stade de France, Inter Milan won the 1998 UEFA Cup final against Lazio. It was the last European football final to be played at the Parc. Two months later, Zidane scored twice at the Stade de France as France defeated Brazil 3–0 in the 1998 FIFA World Cup final to secure their first World Cup title. While the Parc hosted four group stage matches, one round of 16 match and the third-place play-off during the World Cup, it became, above all, the home of PSG after that. In the international stadium scene, the Parc was too small to host a UEFA Champions League final, and whenever the French national football team played outside of Saint-Denis, it was often in other cities.

=== 2024 Summer Olympics and potential PSG move ===
To date, the 2001 Heineken Cup final was the last European club final held at the Parc. English rugby union team Leicester Tigers were crowned European Rugby Champions Cup winners after defeating French champions Stade Français 34–30. The stadium also hosted five matches of the 2007 Rugby World Cup, including France's 34–10 defeat by Argentina in the bronze medal final. In November 2013, PSG reached an agreement with the Council of Paris to extend their lease on their stadium for a further 30 years, until 2043, based on a fixed rent plus a variable share of their revenue. They subsequently completed a three-year renovation of the stadium ahead of UEFA Euro 2016. Its current capacity was kept unchanged, but the seats were improved to be larger and more comfortable. During the tournament, four group stage matches and one round of 16 match were played at the Parc.

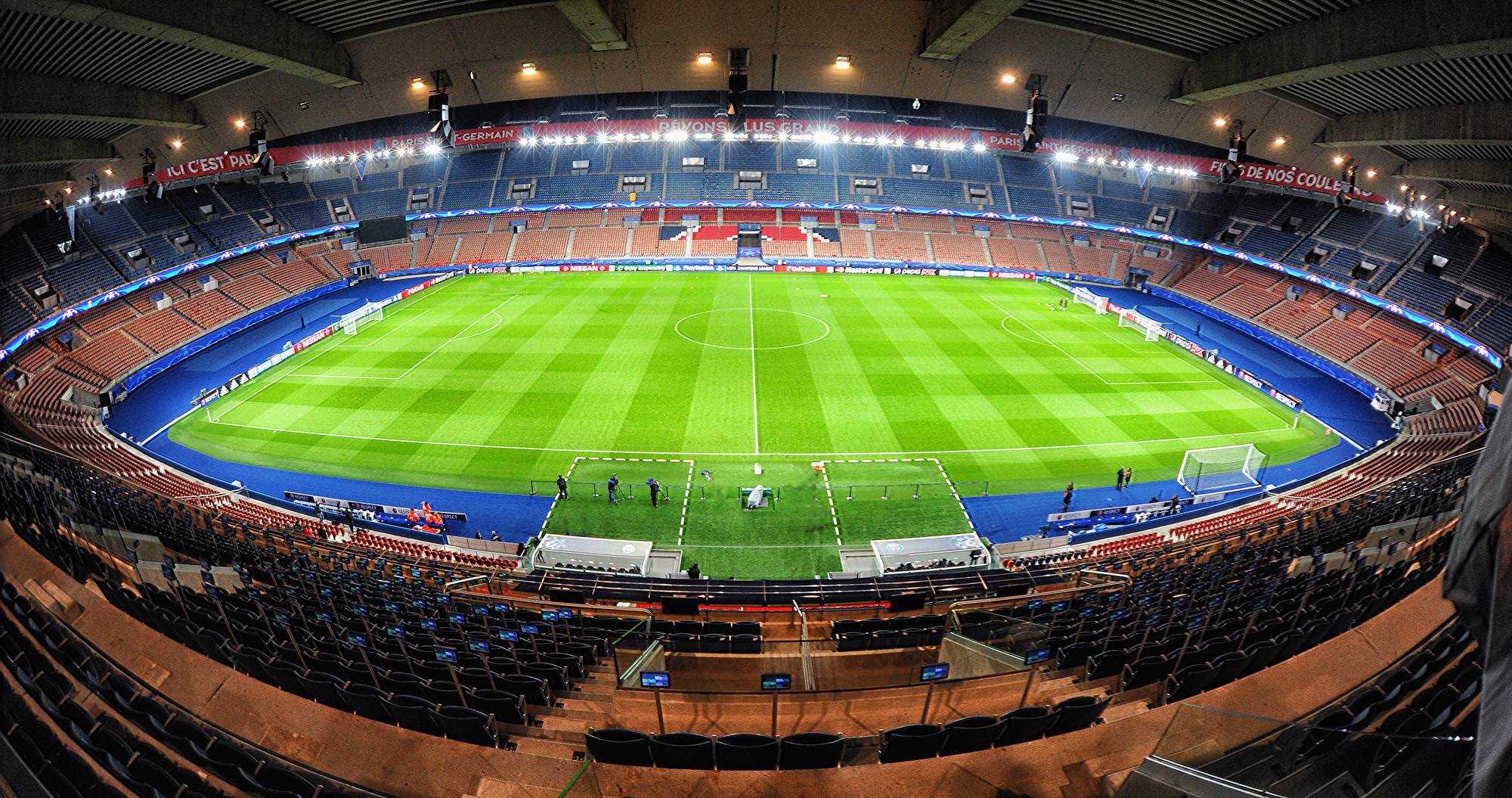
Playing field of the Parc in 2010.

The 2019 FIFA Women's World Cup became the first women's tournament held at the stadium, where France defeated South Korea in the opening match. The Parc then hosted four further group stage matches, a round of 16 match, and France's quarter-final elimination against the United States. The 2023 Trophée des Champions, won by PSG 2–0 against Toulouse, was the first edition to be played at the Parc since 1969.

After being snubbed twice in 1900 and 1924, the Parc was selected as the host of the 2024 Summer Olympics. Both the men's and women's football tournaments were held at the stadium. A total of ten matches were played there, including six group stage matches, two quarter-finals, and both finals. In the men's final, Spain secured their second gold medal with a 5–3 extra-time victory over host country France, while the United States clinched their record fifth gold medal by beating Brazil 1–0 in the women's final.

The 2016 renovation work increased PSG's stadium revenue from €20 million to €100 million, but the club was interested in purchasing the Parc to increase its capacity to 60,000 in the coming years and establish itself as one of Europe's leading teams. PSG considered three options: expanding the Parc, moving to the Stade de France, or building a new stadium. In 2023, after the Council of Paris rejected the club's bid to acquire the Parc, a purchase of the Stade de France was explored. PSG abandoned the proposal in January 2024, citing logistical, financial, and cultural reasons. The club confirmed its plans to leave the Parc and build a new stadium in February 2024.

In 2026, the newly elected Mayor of Paris Emmanuel Grégoire asked councilors to reconsider the previous stance of ending negotiations with PSG to maintain the club at the venue.

== Former and current tenants ==
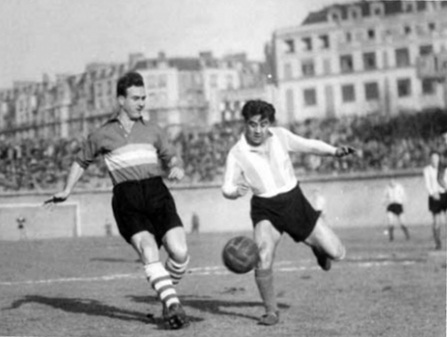
Racing Paris (dark jersey) against Argentine club Racing Club de Avellaneda (light jersey) at the Parc des Princes in 1950.

Team	Parc des Princes	Record Attendance	Source
(France) Racing Paris	1902–1920; 1932–1966; 1984–1990	39,749 vs. Reims, 17 January 1954	
(France) Red Star	1932–1966	33,324 vs. Rouen, 19 April 1953	
(France) Stade Français	1932–1966	38,562 vs. Strasbourg, 16 February 1958	
(France) Paris FC	1972–1974; 1978–1979	40,650 vs. Saint-Étienne, 27 April 1979	
France national football team	1972–1997	48,402 vs. Bulgaria, 17 November 1993	
France national rugby union team	1972–1997	50,370 vs. Wales, 18 February 1989	
(France) Paris Saint-Germain	1974–Present	49,575 vs. Waterschei, 13 March 1983	

== Major sporting events ==
=== Cycling races ===
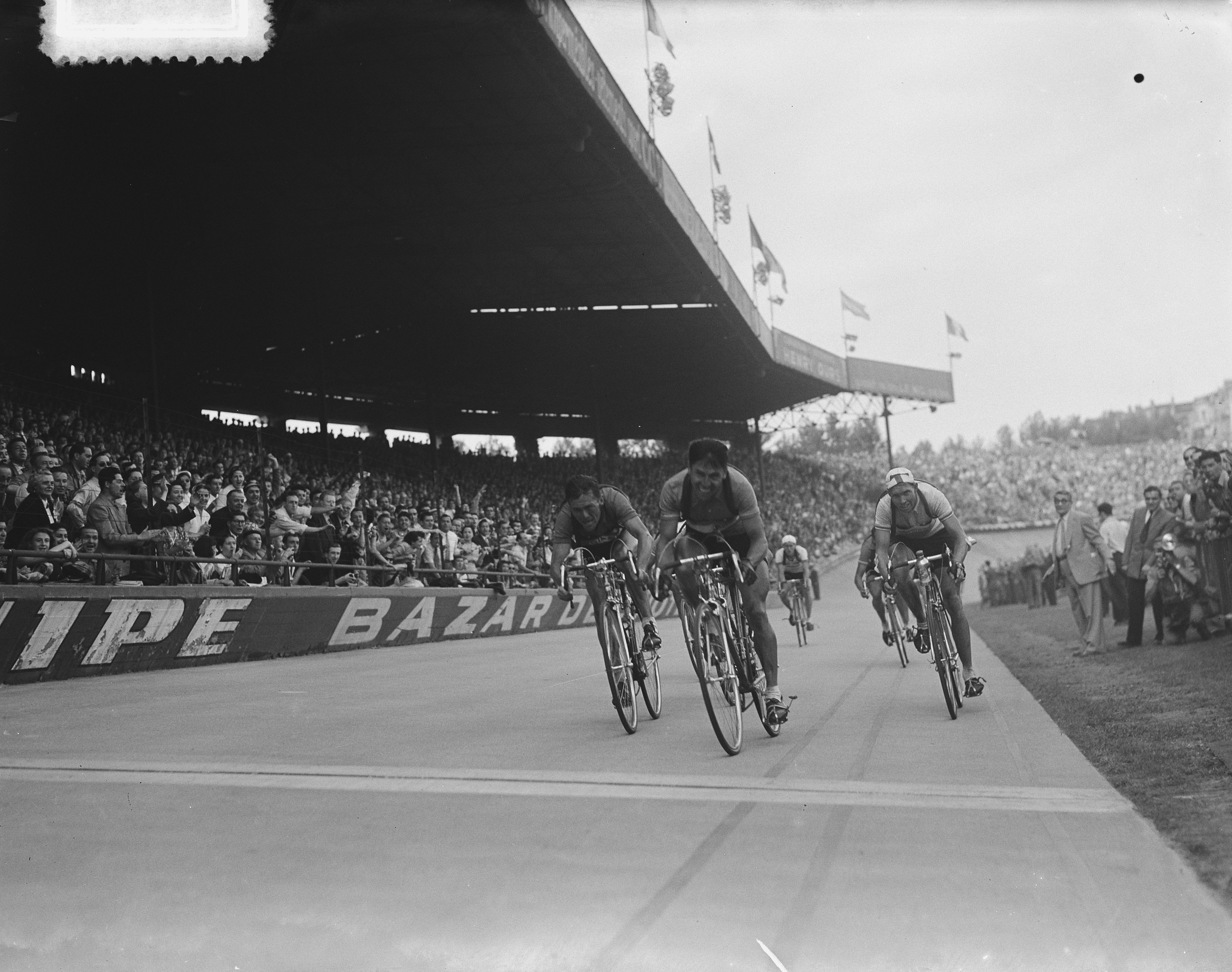
Finish line of the 1952 Tour de France at the Parc des Princes.

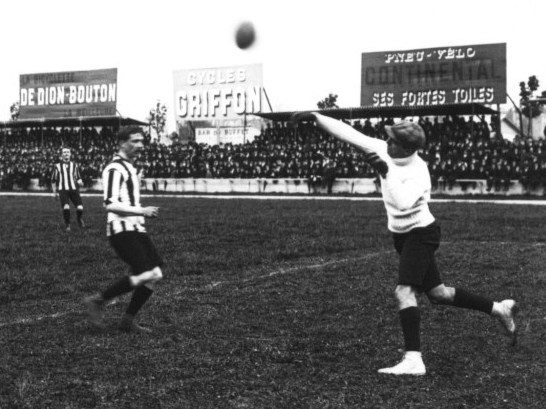
USFSA Football Championship final between Tourcoing and SH Marseille in 1910.

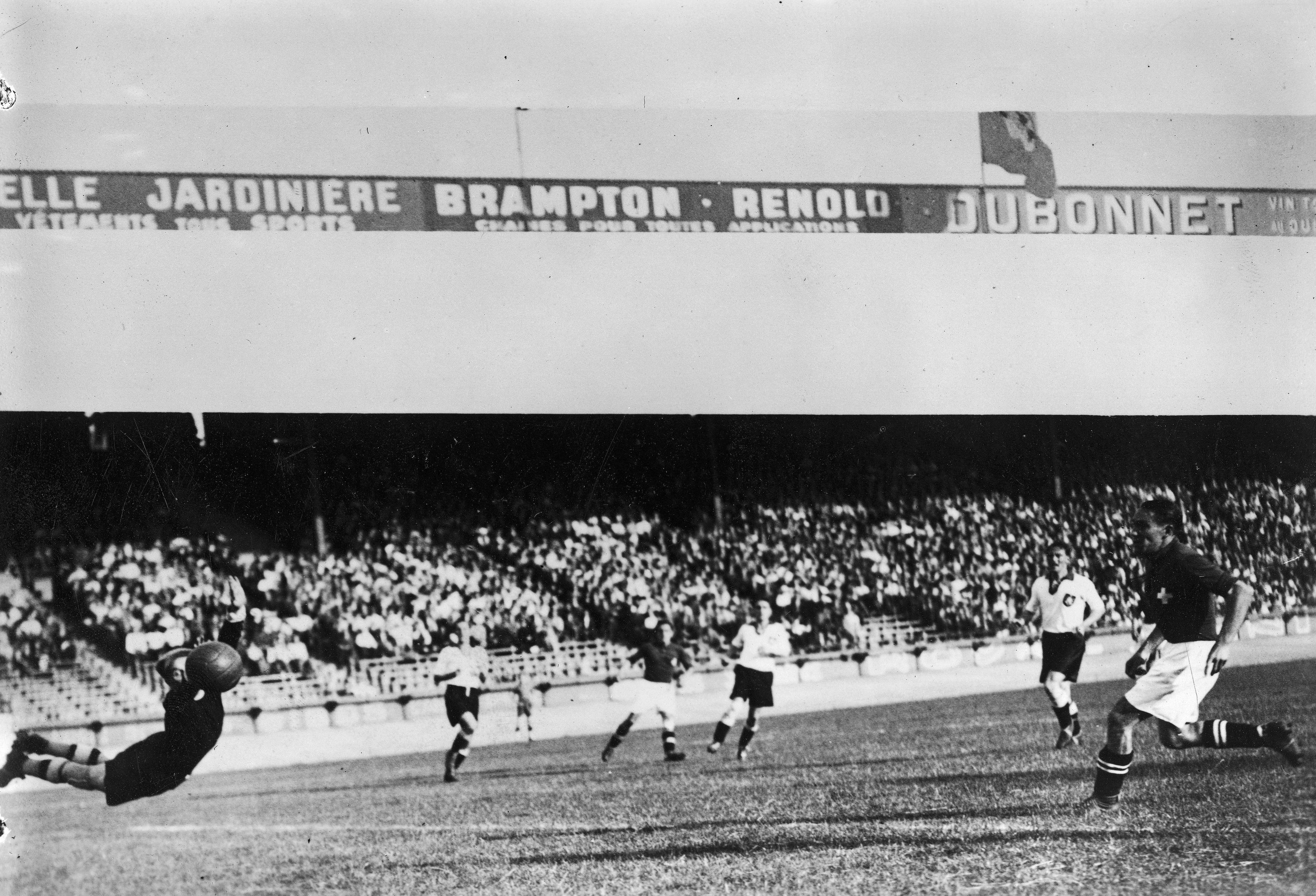
Germany vs. Switzerland during the opening match of the 1938 FIFA World Cup.

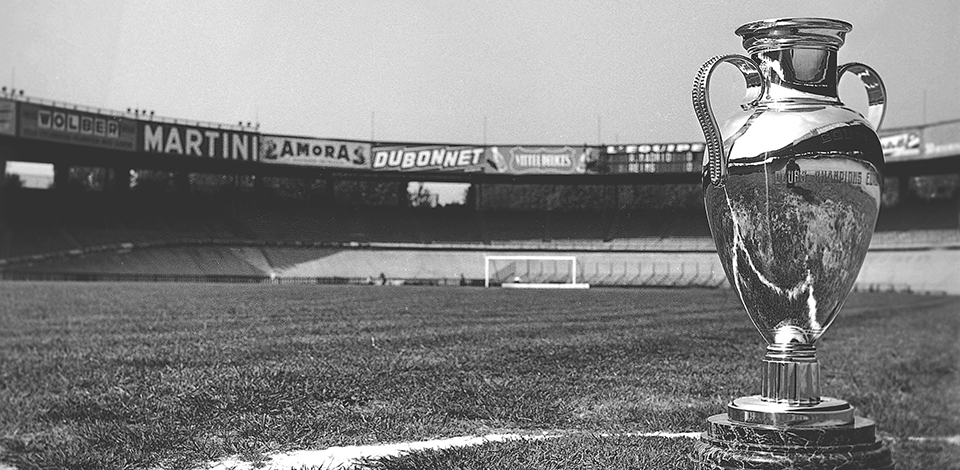
Presentation of the trophy at the Parc ahead of the 1956 European Cup final.

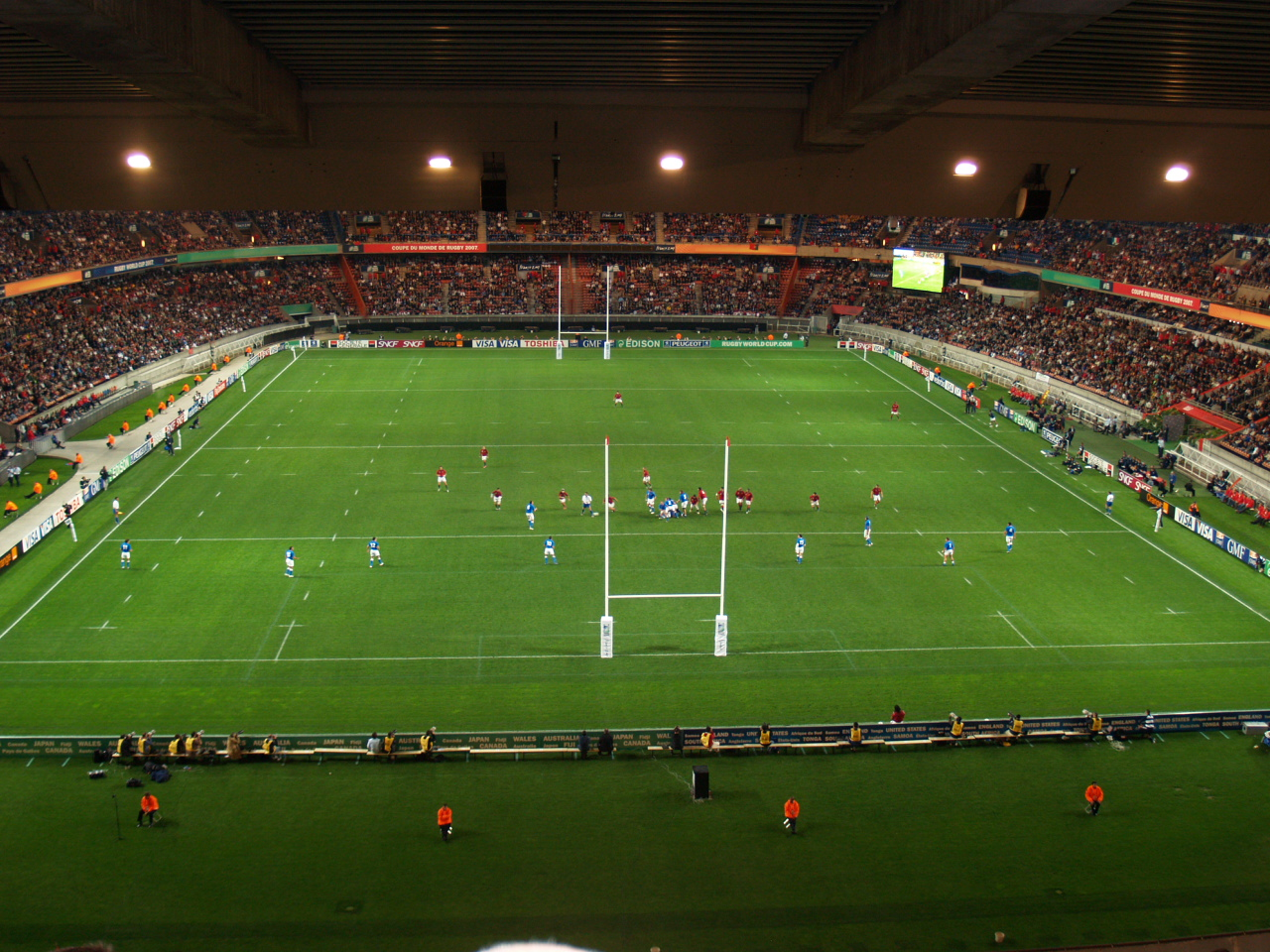
Italy vs. Portugal in the pool stage of the 2007 Rugby World Cup group stage.

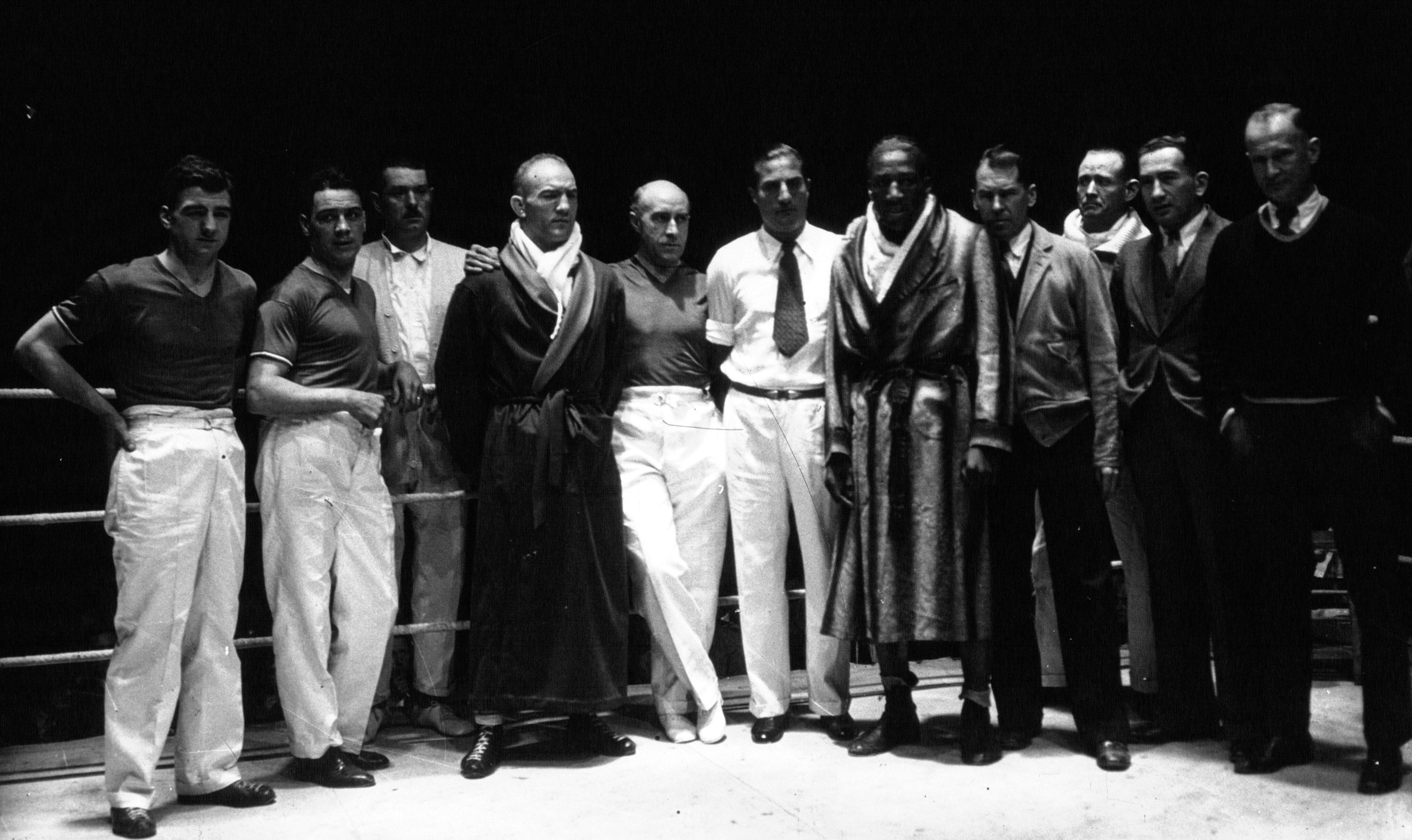
Boxing match between Marcel Thil and Gorilla Jones at the Parc des Princes in 1932.

Event	Editions	Years
Bol d'Or	1	1899
UCI Track Cycling World Championships	9	1900, 1907, 1922, 1924, 1933, 1947, 1952, 1958, 1964
Tour de France	54	1903–1967

=== Football tournaments ===
Event	Editions	Years
FIFA World Cup	2	1938, 1998
UEFA European Championship	3	1960, 1984, 2016
FIFA Women's World Cup	1	2019
Summer Olympic Games	2	2024 (M), 2024 (W)

=== Football finals ===
Event	Editions	Years
USFSA Football Championship	4	1903, 1905, 1907, 1910
Coupe Dewar	1	1905
Coupe de France	33	1919, 1938, 1940, 1944, 1963, 1965, 1966, 1967, 1972–1997
Latin Cup	2	1952, 1955
Coupe Charles Drago	7	1953, 1954, 1955, 1956, 1957, 1959, 1961
Trophée des Champions	4	1956, 1959, 1969, 2023
UEFA Champions League	3	1956, 1975, 1981
UEFA European Championship	2	1960, 1984
Championnat de France Amateur	5	1965, 1966, 1968, 1969, 1970
Coupe de la Ligue	4	1965, 1995, 1996, 1997
UEFA Cup Winners' Cup	2	1978, 1995
UEFA Super Cup	1	1996
UEFA Europa League	1	1998
Summer Olympic Games	2	2024 (M), 2024 (W)

=== Rugby tournaments ===
Event	Editions	Years
Six Nations Championship	31	1910, 1911, 1912, 1913, 1914, 1920, 1973–1997
FIRA Tournament	1	1937
Victory Internationals	1	1945–46
Rugby League World Cup	2	1954, 1972
Rugby World Cup	2	1991, 2007

=== Rugby finals ===
Event	Editions	Years
Top 14	31	1902, 1906, 1910, 1943, 1944, 1945, 1946, 1974–1997
FIRA Tournament	1	1937
Rugby League World Cup	1	1954
European Rugby Champions Cup	1	2001

=== Boxing matches ===
Date	Match	Winner	Attendance
12 June 1932	Marcel Thil vs. Gorilla Jones	Thil	70,000
25 May 1946	Marcel Cerdan vs. Robert Charron	Cerdan	
25 May 1946	Laurent Dauthuille vs. Jean Pankowiak	Dauthuille	
25 May 1946	Baby Day vs. Gustave Degouve	Degouve	
25 May 1946	Georges Martin vs. Denis Juliani	Martin	
25 May 1946	Prevost vs. Andre Gonnet	Prevost	
25 May 1946	Victor Buttin vs. Shali Said Kaddour	Kaddour	

== Other uses ==
=== Films ===
Since the 1930s, the Parc des Princes has appeared in several films.

Title	Release Date	Director	Genre	Leading Actor	Source
(France) The Five Cents of Lavarede	1939	(France) Maurice Cammage	Comedy	(France) Fernandel	
(France) Five Red Tulips	1949	(France) Jean Stelli	Crime	(France) René Dary	
(France) Rue des prairies	1959	(France) Denys de La Patellière	Comedy	(France) Jean Gabin	
(France) Moi y'en a vouloir des sous	1973	(France) Jean Yanne	Comedy	(France) Jean Yanne	
(France) Death of a Corrupt Man	1977	(France) Georges Lautner	Crime	(France) Alain Delon	
(France) Dead Tired	1994	(France) Michel Blanc	Comedy	(France) Michel Blanc	
(France) La Belle Verte	1996	(France) Coline Serreau	Science fiction	(France) Coline Serreau	
(France) Didier	1997	(France) Alain Chabat	Comedy	(France) Jean-Pierre Bacri	
(France) Paparazzi	1998	(France) Alain Berbérian	Comedy	(France) Patrick Timsit	
(France) En plein coeur	1998	(France) Pierre Jolivet	Crime	(France) Gérard Lanvin	
(France) My Wife Is an Actress	2001	(France) Yvan Attal	Romance	(France) Charlotte Gainsbourg	
(France) Trois Zéros	2002	(France) Fabien Onteniente	Comedy	(France) Gérard Lanvin	
(France) Monique: toujours contente	2002	(France) Valérie Guignabodet	Comedy	(France) Albert Dupontel	
(France) Les 11 commandements	2004	(France) François Desagnat	Comedy	(France) Michaël Youn	
(France) Les 11 commandements	2004	(France) Thomas Sorriaux	Comedy	(France) Michaël Youn	
(France) My Best Friend	2006	(France) Patrice Leconte	Comedy	(France) Daniel Auteuil	
(France) Micmacs	2009	(France) Jean-Pierre Jeunet	Comedy	(France) Dany Boon	
(France) La Dream Team	2016	(France) Thomas Sorriaux	Comedy	(France) Medi Sadoun	
(France) Classico	2022	(France) Nathanaël Guedj and (France) Adrien Piquet-Gauthier	Comedy	(France) Ahmed Sylla	
(France) Quatre Zéros	2024	(France) Fabien Onteniente	Comedy	(France) Gérard Lanvin	

=== Concerts ===
Since the 1980s, the Parc des Princes has hosted several major concerts.

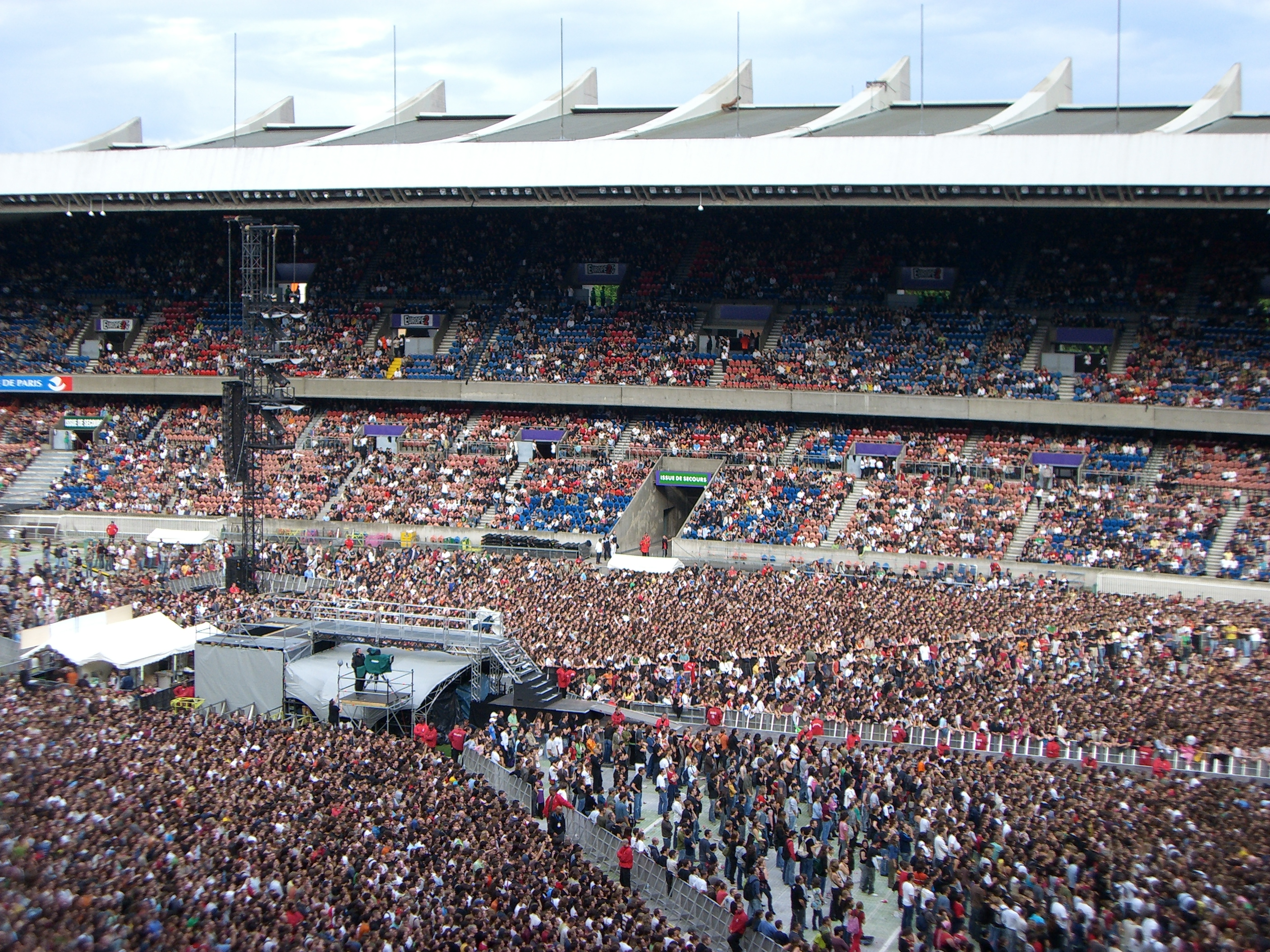
Before the Muse concert in June 2007.

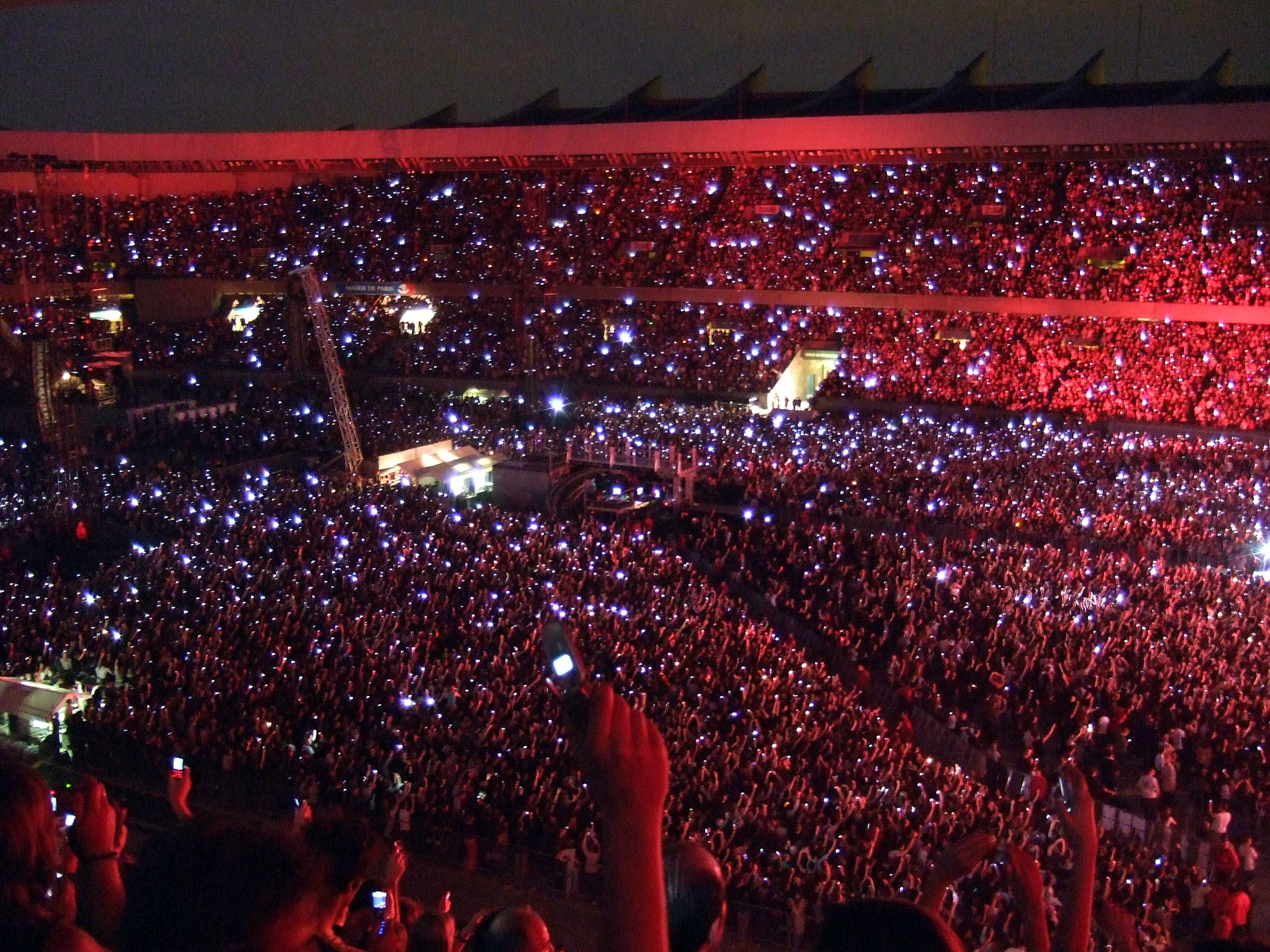
During the Muse concert in June 2007.

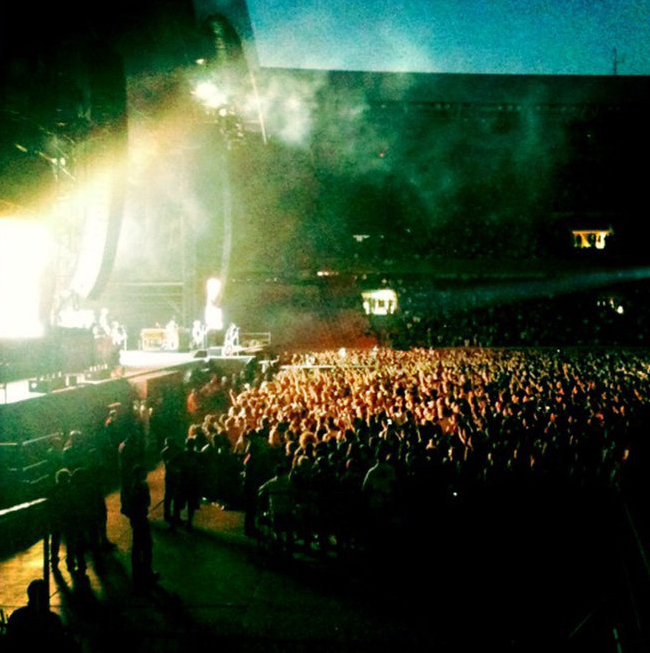
Green Day concert in June 2010.

Name	Tour	Date	Attendance	Source
(United States) Michael Jackson	Bad	27 June 1988	63,000	
(United States) Michael Jackson	Bad	28 June 1988	63,000	
(United States) Prince	Nude Tour	16 June 1990	45,677	
(England) The Rolling Stones	Steel Wheels/Urban Jungle Tour	22 June 1990		
(England) The Rolling Stones	Steel Wheels/Urban Jungle Tour	23 June 1990		
(England) The Rolling Stones	Steel Wheels/Urban Jungle Tour	25 June 1990		
(France) Johnny Hallyday	Retiens ta nuit	18 June 1993		
(France) Johnny Hallyday	Retiens ta nuit	19 June 1993		
(France) Johnny Hallyday	Retiens ta nuit	20 June 1993		
(England) David Bowie	Earthling Tour	14 June 1997		
(United States) Michael Jackson	HIStory World Tour	27 June 1997	65,000	
(United States) Michael Jackson	HIStory World Tour	29 June 1997	55,000	
(Republic of Ireland) U2	PopMart Tour	6 September 1997	53,519	
(France) Johnny Hallyday	Plus près de vous	10 June 2003		
(France) Johnny Hallyday	Plus près de vous	11 June 2003		
(France) Johnny Hallyday	Plus près de vous	14 June 2003		
(France) Johnny Hallyday	Plus près de vous	15 June 2003		
(United States) Red Hot Chili Peppers	Roll on the Red Tour	15 June 2004		
(United States) Metallica	Madly in Anger with the World Tour	23 June 2004		
(England) Iron Maiden	Eddie Rips Up the World Tour	25 June 2005		
(England) Robbie Williams	Close Encounters Tour	17 June 2006		
(England) Muse	Black Holes and Revelations Tour	23 June 2007		
(England) Genesis	Turn It On Again: The Tour	30 June 2007	49,606	
(United States) Red Hot Chili Peppers	Stadium Arcadium World Tour	6 July 2007	48,713	
(Germany) Tokio Hotel	1000 Hotels World Tour	21 June 2008		
(United States) Bruce Springsteen	Magic Tour	27 June 2008	40,661	
(England) Mika	Dodgy Holiday Tour	4 July 2008	55,000	
(United Kingdom) Coldplay	Viva la Vida Tour	7 September 2009	50,335	
(France) Suprême NTM		19 June 2010	35,000	
(United States) Green Day	21st Century Breakdown World Tour	26 June 2010	35,000	
(France) DJ Snake		11 June 2022	60,000	
(France) Dadju		18 June 2022	50,000	

== See also ==
- Camp des Loges
- Stade Georges Lefèvre
- Campus PSG

Events and tenants
Preceded by All 8 venues used for the 1934 FIFA World Cup, matches on the first day were all played at the same time	FIFA World Cup; Opening match venue 1938	Succeeded by Estádio do Maracanã; Rio de Janeiro
Preceded by first stadium	European Cup; Final venue 1956	Succeeded by Estadio Santiago Bernabéu; Madrid
Preceded by first stadium	European Nations' Cup; Final venue 1960	Succeeded by Estadio Santiago Bernabéu; Madrid
Preceded by Heysel Stadium; Brussels	European Cup; Final venue 1975	Succeeded by Hampden Park; Glasgow
Preceded by Olympisch Stadion; Amsterdam	European Cup Winners' Cup; Final venue 1978	Succeeded by St. Jakob Stadium; Basel
Preceded by Santiago Bernabéu Stadium; Madrid	European Cup; Final venue 1981	Succeeded by De Kuip; Rotterdam
Preceded by Parken Stadium; Copenhagen	UEFA Cup Winners' Cup; Final venue 1995	Succeeded by King Baudouin Stadium; Brussels
Preceded by Two-legged final	UEFA Cup; Final venue 1998	Succeeded by Luzhniki Stadium; Moscow
