= André Poullain =

French footballer (1893–1954)

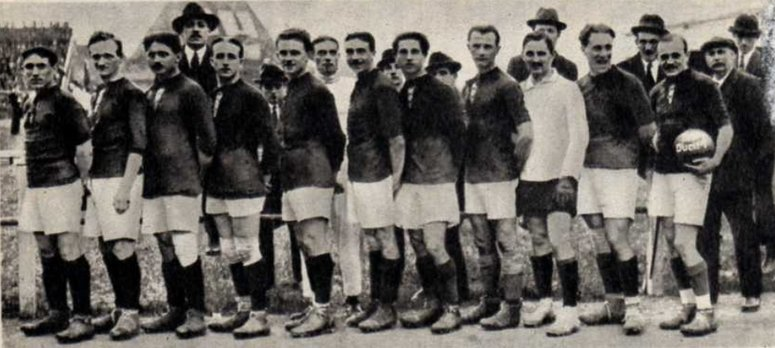
- André Poullain (fifth, from the left) in 1920

Personal information
- Date of birth: 25 November 1893
- Place of birth: 18th arrondissement of Paris, France
- Date of death: 11 June 1954 (aged 60)
- Place of death: Noisy-le-Grand, France
- Position: Forward

Senior career*
Years	Team	Apps	(Gls)
1909–1914	Club des Sports; Athlétiques		
1917–1920	CA Paris		

International career
1913	France	3	(2)
1918–1919	France military	3	(0)
- * Club domestic league appearances and goals

André Poullain (25 November 1893 – 11 June 1954) was a French footballer who played as a forward for CA Paris and the French national team in the 1910s.

== Playing career ==
=== Club des Sports Athlétiques ===
Born in the 18th arrondissement of Paris on 25 November 1893, (Note: Some sources wrongly state that he was born in 1885.) Poullain began playing football as a 9-year-old with his friends, Dartoux and Landauer, doing so with a paper ball in the rue des Rosiers, in Saint-Ouen, near the headquarters of the CSA (Club des Sports Athlétiques), and on one occasion, in 1909, this group of kids faced the first team of CSA, replacing their opponents who had failed to turn up, and won. That same evening, Dartoux and Landauer signed for CSA, while Poullain joined the second team, before reaching the first team the following year, in 1910, aged 19.

With the CSA, which had joined the Ligue de Football Association (LFA) in 1910, Poullain faced the best Parisian clubs, and even played some friendlies in the ranks of Jules Rimet's Red Star AC, alongside Eugène Maës, but he did not impose himself because of his style, which was always discussed, since he placed efficiency above technique, often shooting on goal, including from afar, which was uncommon at the time. He was thus criticized for his lack of technique, especially dribbling, which he compensated for with a lot of passion, being described as "passionate, courage personified". On 20 February 1912, he started for a first division team in a 3–0 friendly victory over a second division team, forming a good attacking partnership with his teammate Parize.

=== International career ===
Despite his lack of technique, his game married that of Maës, who was basically a "target man" or "poacher", and therefore, on 27 February 1913, both of them were called up by France for a friendly match against England amateurs at Colombes, which ended in a 1–4 loss; Poullain scored his side's only goal in the 75th minute, with a shot from 25 meters out that beat the English goalkeeper Horace Bailey, a 1912 Olympic champion.

Two weeks later, on 9 March, he earned his second international cap against Switzerland, but this time without Maës, thus failing to contribute in a 4–1 win. In his third and last appearance for France, however, he once again played alongside Maës, scoring once and assisting another to help his side to an 8–0 win over Luxembourg, which still is the joint-largest winning margin achieved at home by France.

=== Wartime football ===
At the end of August 1914, still in the early stages of the First World War, Poullain was taken prisoner and was transferred to the Altengrabow camp, near Magdeburg, where he found several fellow international footballers, such as Henri Lesur, Charles Renaux, Victor Denis, among others, who joined forces to form a team, but the games were often interrupted by the German sentries because the prisoners were not being allowed to cross the barbed wire that separated the barracks. The Germans had little concern for taking care of the sick, so when Poullain fell ill, he was repatriated back to France, where he returned to playing football, this time at CA Paris, from 1917. Poullain went on to wear the national jersey again, but this time unofficially, in a friendly against Belgium on 21 April 1918 (2–5), alongside Devaquez and Darques, and his old comrade Dartoux.

In the summer of 1919, Poullain was a member of the French committee that went to the Inter-Allied Games in Paris, a large sports competition organized in celebration of the Allied victory in the War, being listed as a member of the football team, whose squad was formed by soldiers who had participated in the War. He started in the opening two matches, helping France to achieve victories over Romania (4–0) and Italy (2–0), but he was then injured and missed the final, being replaced by Paul Deydier who scored the opening goal in an eventual 2–3 loss to Czechoslovakia.

=== Later career ===
Together with Marcel Vanco, Louis Mesnier, and Henri Bard, Poullain was a member of the CA Paris team that won the Coupe de France in 1920, scoring two goals in the quarterfinals against Red Star, following it up with another brace in the semifinals to help his side to a 2–1 win over VGA Médoc on 11 April 1920; his second goal was described as "an unstoppable shot". He then started in the final on 9 May, which ended in a 2–1 win over Le Havre.

== Later life and death ==
In November 1925, Poullain was working as an employee at Les Halles.

Poullain died in Noisy-le-Grand on 11 June 1954, at the age of 60.

== Career statistics ==
France score listed first, score column indicates score after each Poullain goal.

List of international goals scored by André Poullain
No.	Date	Venue	Opponent	Score	Result	Competition
1	15 May 1910	Stade Colombes, Colombes, France	England amateurs	1–4	1–4	Friendly match
2	20 April 1913	Stade Bauer, Saint-Ouen, France	Luxembourg	2–0	8–0	Friendly match

== Honours ==
=== Club ===
CA Paris

- Coupe de France:
  - Champions (1): 1919–20

=== International ===
France

- Inter-Allied Games
  - Runner-up (1): 1919
