= Baudier =

Baudier is a French surname. Notable people with the surname include:

- Jean-Nicolas Baudier (1766–1847), French politician
- Louis Étienne Baudier de Royaumont (1854–1918), French journalist, publishing director, man of letters, novelist, playwright, and historian
- Maurice Baudier (1897–1932), French footballer
- Michel Baudier (c. 1589–1645), French historian
- Paul Baudier (1881–1962), French painter, engraver, and illustrator
