= Siavash Teimouri =

Iranian architect, artist and scholar (born 1937)

- Born: 22 June 1937 (age 89); Tehran, Imperial State of Iran
- Education: University of Tehran; École nationale supérieure des Beaux-Arts
- Occupations: Architect, Architectural Historian, Artist and Scholar.
- Notable work: Parc des Princes; East-west line of RER
- Awards: French Association Architects' prize (1967).

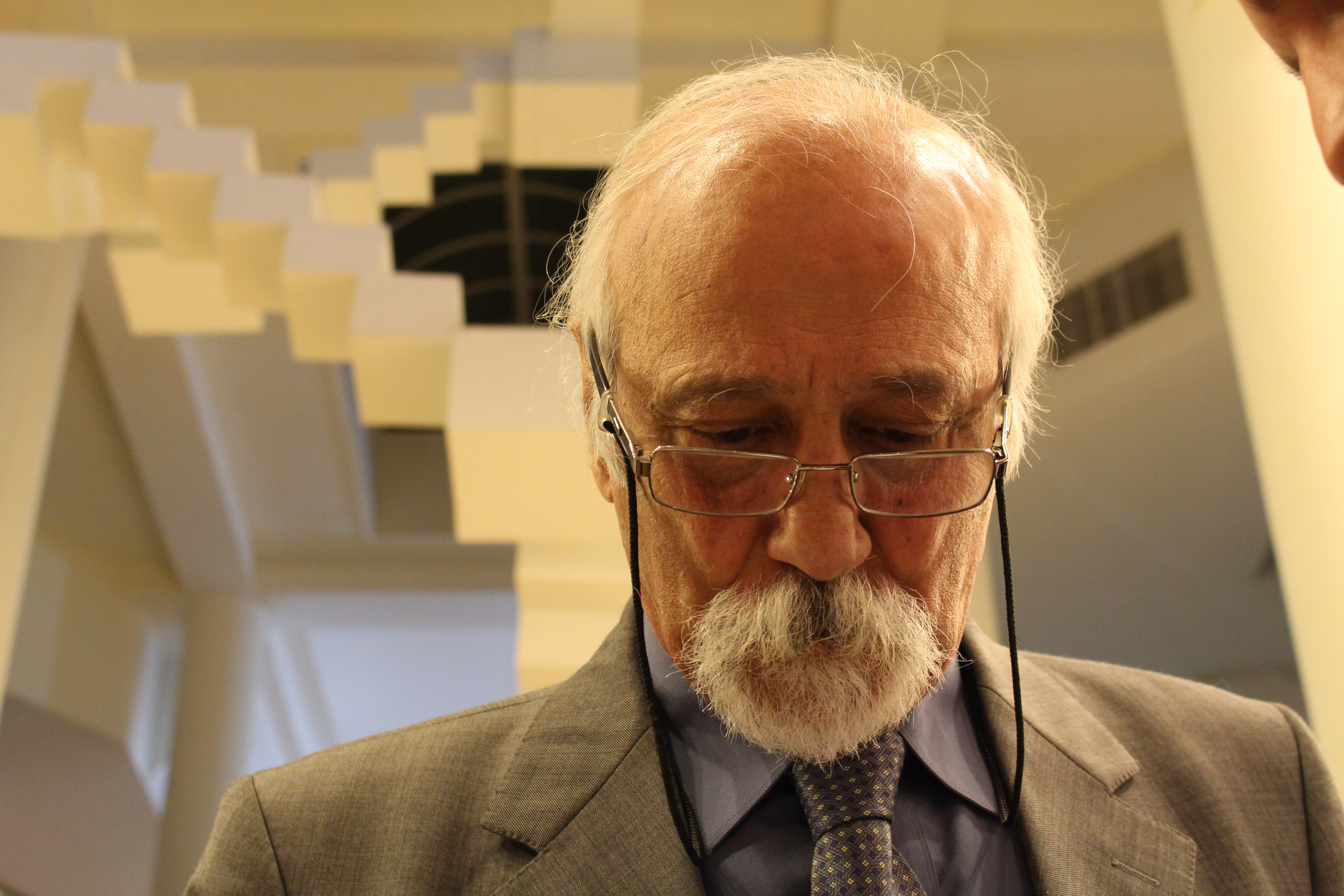

Siavash Teimouri (Persian:سیاوش تیموری) (born 22 June 1937) is an Iranian architect, artist and scholar. Born in Tehran, Iran, he graduated from the College of Fine Arts, University of Tehran with the highest mark under the supervision of Hooshang Seyhoun. He was then granted a scholarship to pursue his education in France in 1962, where he studied at École nationale supérieure des Beaux-Arts and graduated with a Diploma of Architecture (DPLG) in 1969 under the supervision of Le Corbusier. He worked with world-class architects of his time and received the French Association Architects' Prize in 1967. He is a member of the French Society of Architects and the board of trustees of Iran's Architects' Association.

During his time in France, he worked as draftsman and architect with renowned architects such as Roger Taillibert, Michel Marot, Georges Candilis, and Jean Frottier. Upon his return to Iran in the late 60's, he was invited by the then president of the University of Tehran, Fazlollah Reza, for lectureship in architecture. He was founder and CEO of Farmoum Consulting Engineers and serves as a professor in various universities in Iran. He is the author of numerous articles and books on architecture and arts, has several designs awards and recognitions, and is known among the influential postmodern architects.

== Partial list of projects ==
- Residential complexes in Villejuif, France
- Sun Tower apartment building in Nice, France
- Chateau Périgord apartment building in Nice, France
- Sports Stadium in Limoge, France
- Parc des Princes stadium, in Paris, France
- Buildings in Arras, France
- Industrial and cinematographic centre, St Germain En Laye
- Health centre affiliated with the University of Paris, faculty of Medicine
- Villefranche and Marina Bais des Anges leisure ports
- St Denis institution in Reunion Island
- Indoor swimming pool of Casino Deauville, France
- Centre for training paralysed children in Montroda, France
- Centre for development of mind and body in Font Romeu, France
- Campus les Violettes near Chateau Amboise (winner of the smallest building with highest efficiency)
- Designer and chief supervisor of RER, the commuter rail in Paris, France
