= Marcel Vanco =

French footballer (1895–1987)

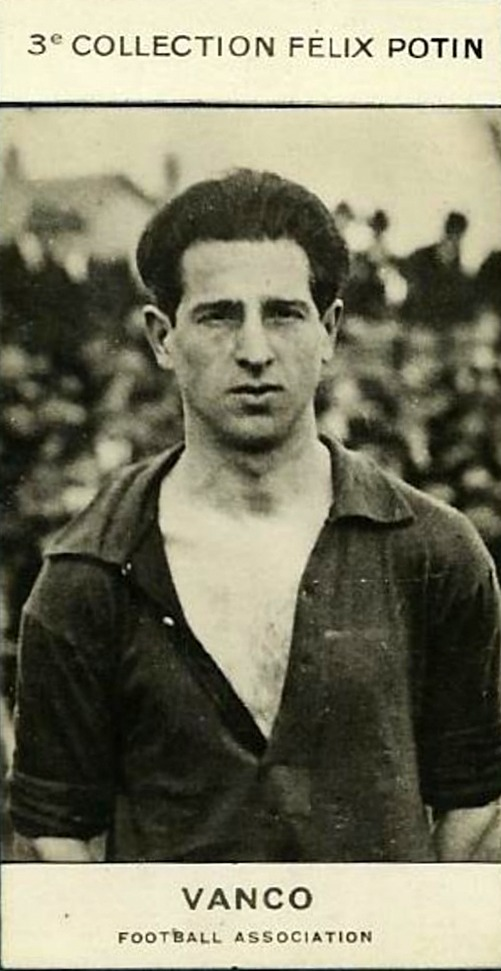
- Marcel Vanco in 1922

Personal information
- Full name: Joseph Marcel Vanco
- Date of birth: 19 March 1895
- Place of birth: Marseille, France
- Date of death: 10 July 1987 (aged 92)
- Place of death: Croix, Nord, France
- Position: Defender

Youth career
- 1909–1912: SH de Marseille

Senior career*
Years	Team	Apps	(Gls)
1912–1914	SH de Marseille		
1914–1918	Olympique de Marseille		
1918–1923	CA Paris		
1923–1928	RC Roubaix		

International career
1920–1923	France	8	(0)
- * Club domestic league appearances and goals

Joseph Marcel Vanco (19 March 1895 – 10 July 1987) was a French footballer who played as a defender for Olympique de Marseille, CA Paris, RC Roubaix, and the French national team in the 1910s and 1920s.

== Career ==
=== SH de Marseille ===
Born in Marseille on 19 March 1895, Vanco began his football career in 1909, aged 14, in the youth ranks of his hometown club Stade Helvétique de Marseille, a team made up of Swiss and English immigrants, reaching the first team in 1912, and on 27 April 1913, the 18-year-old Vanco was one of only two French players who started in the final of the USFSA national championship, providing an assist to Mouren for the only goal of the match in a 1–0 victory over FC Rouen. After the match, the journalists of L'Auto (the forerunner of L'Équipe) stated that "Vanco, in the center, contributed very intelligently with his interiors, but at no time did he place a trully dangerous shot".

=== Olympique de Marseille ===
In 1914, Stade Helvétique had to close its doors due to a lack of opponents, since all of them had been mobilized on the front during the outbreak of the First World War, with the club eventually ceasing all activity in 1916. Their biggest rivals, Olympique Marseille, took advantage of its dissolution to incorporate several of the club's most prominent players, such as Vanco and three of the Scheibenstock brothers. However, while the Scheibenstocks remained in France due to their status as Swiss, which remained neutral during the War, Vanco was mobilized twice, fighting in the War in 1915–16 and 1917–18, where he notably took part in the battle of Verdun in 1916. In total, he scored 4 goals in 9 official matches for OM.

=== CA Paris ===
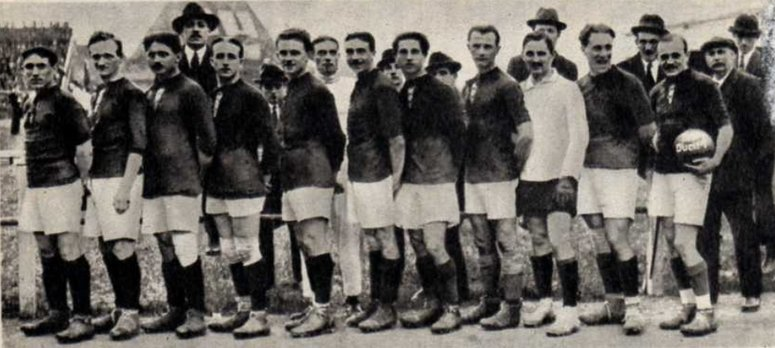
Vanco (fourth from right) with the CA Paris team that won the 1920 Coupe de France.

When the War ended in 1918, Vanco returned to Paris to study veterinary medicine, and while there, he played for CA Paris, and together with André Poullain, Louis Mesnier, and Henri Bard, he was a member of the CA Paris team that won the Coupe de France in 1920, helping his side to a 2–1 win over VGA Médoc in the semifinals on 11 April 1920, followed by another 2–1 win over Le Havre in the final on 9 May.

Vanco stayed loyal to the club for five years, from 1918 to 1923, when he decided to move to RC Roubaix, where he retired in 1928, aged 33, as one of the oldest players in Marseille football at the time. While there, he played alongside the likes of Georges Verriest, Raymond Wattine, and Raymond Dubly.

=== International career ===
On 28 March 1920, the 25-year-old Vanco made his debut for France in a friendly match against Belgium, helping his side to a 2–1 win. His next three international appearances came against British teams, with only the latter ending in a win (2–1) over England amateurs. He was thus part of the first French team that defeated England.

In total, he earned eight international caps between 1920 and 1923, all of which being friendlies at home, making his last appearance on 28 October 1923 against Norway, already as a Roubaix player.

== Death ==
Outside football, Vanco was working as a veterinarian in Roubaix in 1925. He died in Croix, Nord on 10 July 1987, at the age of 92, and was buried in the Roubaix cemetery.

== Honours ==
SH de Marseille

- Littoral Championship: 1913, 1914
- USFSA Football Championship: 1913

CA Paris

- Coupe de France: 1919–20
