= Charles Renaux =

French footballer (1884–1971)

Personal information
- Date of birth: 31 December 1884
- Place of birth: Roubaix, France
- Date of death: 17 October 1971 (aged 86)
- Place of death: Roubaix, France

International career
Years	Team	Apps	(Gls)
- France

Charles Renaux (31 December 1884 – 17 October 1971) was a French footballer. He competed in the men's tournament at the 1908 Summer Olympics.
