= 1920 Coupe de France final =

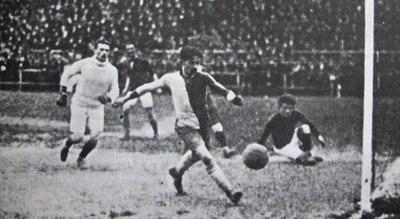
- CA Paris - Le Havre 1920
- Event: 1919–20 Coupe de France
CA Paris	Le Havre
2	1
- Date: 9 May 1920
- Venue: Stade Bergeyre, Paris
- Referee: Edmond Gérardin
- Attendance: 7,000

The 1920 Coupe de France final was a football match held at Stade Bergeyre, Paris on 9 May 1920, that saw CA Paris defeat Le Havre AC 2–1 thanks to goals by Henri Bard.

== Match details ==
9 May 1920

CA Paris	2–1	Le Havre
Bard ?' ?'		Thorel ?'

Stade Bergeyre, Paris
Attendance: 7,000
Referee: Edmond Gérardin

GK	(Switzerland) Ivan Dreyfus
DF	(France) Marcel Vanco
DF	(France) Louis Mesnier
DF	Charles McDewitt
DF	(France) Maurice Bigué
MF	(France) André Allegre
MF	(France) Raoul Dupé
FW	(Switzerland) Robert Pache
FW	(France) André Poullain
FW	(France) Henri Bard (c)
FW	(France) Ernest Gravier
Manager:
? Assistant Referees: Fourth Official:

GK	(France) Drancourt
DF	(France) Grivel
DF	(France) Henri Gibbon (c)
DF	(France) Victor Dial
DF	(France) Fernand Mérieult
MF	(France) Maurice Avenel
MF	(France) Raymond Cantais
FW	(France) Robert Accard
FW	(France) Louis Blouin
FW	(France) Alfred Thorel
FW	(France) Bernard Lenoble
Manager:
?

== See also ==
- 1919–20 Coupe de France
