= Ivan Dreyfus =

Swiss footballer (1884–1975)

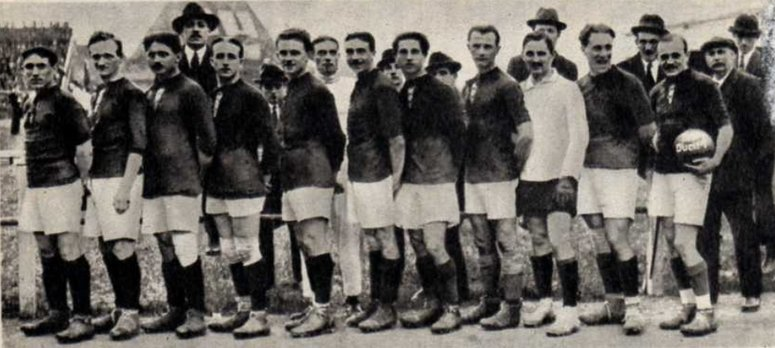
- Dreyfus (third, from the left) in 1920

Personal information
- Date of birth: 24 June 1884
- Place of birth: Aarburg, Switzerland
- Date of death: 8 February 1975 (aged 90)
- Place of death: Neuilly-sur-Seine, Switzerland
- Position: Goalkeeper

Senior career*
Years	Team	Apps	(Gls)
1906–1914	Servette		
1918–1920	CA Paris		

International career
1908–1913	Switzerland	6	(0)
- * Club domestic league appearances and goals

Ivan Dreyfus (24 June 1884 – 8 February 1975) was a Swiss footballer who played as a goalkeeper for Swiss national team between 1908 and 1913, and for CA Paris in the early 1920s.

== Early life and education ==
Ivan Dreyfus was born in Aarburg on 24 June 1884, as the eighteenth child of a Jewish family who had taken refuge in Switzerland after the annexations of Alsace–Lorraine. As the son of a well-off family, he was sent to England to complete his studies, doing so in Shrewsbury and Oxford, where he developed an deep interest in football. He spoke fluent French, German, and English.

== Career ==
After returning to his mother's home in Nyon, Dreyfus began studying medicine in Geneva, joining the ranks of Servette FC in the 1906–07 season, not only as a doctor, but also as a goalkeeper, helping his side win its first Swiss championship in 1907. He stayed there for eight years, until the 1913–14 season. Despite having a Jewish name, he was accepted into Genevan society, which was not particularly Jewish-friendly.

On 8 March 1908, the 23-year-old Dreyfus made his debut for Switzerland in a friendly match against France in Geneva, conceding two goals in a 1–2 loss. The following day, the journalists of the French newspaper L'Auto (the forerunner of L'Équipe) stated that he "had to perform real feats to prevent numerous goals". The following month, on 5 April, he started in a friendly against Germany, which was playing their first-ever match that day, helping his side to a 5–3 victory; it is said that while making a save, he hurled "mustard and sauce at Becker's tuxedo, which he had rented for twelve marks". He went on to earn a further four caps for Switzerland, keeping only one clean-sheet, in a 3–0 win over Italy.

As a dual French-Swiss national, Dreyfus served for France during the First World War. Once the conflict was over, he returned to football, playing with CA Paris between 1918 and 1920. The club's starting goalkeeper fell ill before the quarter-final of the 1919–20 Coupe de France, so Dreyfus replaced him despite having no training and helped his side reach the final, which ended in a 2–1 win over Le Havre. The following day, the journalists of L'Auto stated that "Dreyfus had little to do".

== Later life ==
Following the occupation of France by Nazi Germany during World War II, Dreyfus, then the owner of a clinic in Paris, joined the French Resistance. During a mission on 12 March 1943, he was arrested and transferred to the Alderney camps, where he used his skills as a doctor to care for the sick and wounded, for which he was decorated at the Buckingham Palace by the Polish government.

Once the conflict was over, Dreyfus took over the management of the famous Barth Foundation, which he passed on to one of his sons in 1973.

== Death ==
Dreyfus died in Neuilly-sur-Seine on 8 February 1975, at the age of 90.

== Honours ==
CA Paris

- Coupe de France:
  - Champions (1): 1919–20
