= Louis Mesnier =

French footballer (1884–1921)

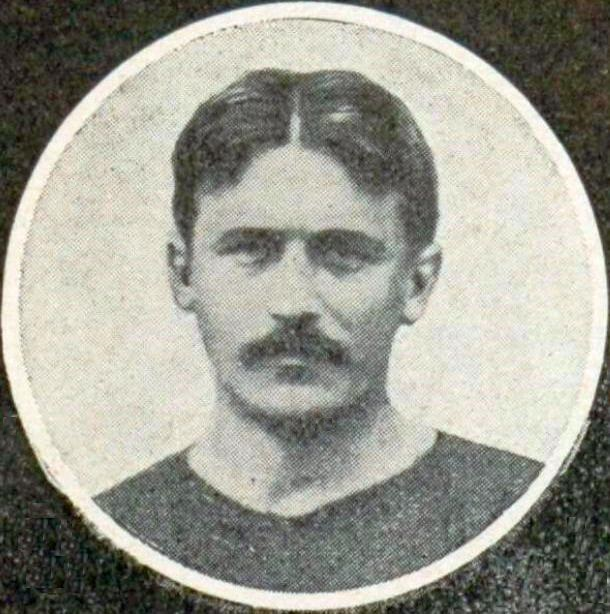
- Louis Mesnier circa 1900

Personal information
- Full name: Louis Mesnier
- Date of birth: 15 December 1884
- Place of birth: Angers, France
- Date of death: 8 October 1921 (aged 36)
- Place of death: Paris, France
- Position: Winger

Senior career*
Years	Team	Apps	(Gls)
	CA Paris	–	(–)
	FC Paris	–	(–)

International career
1904–1913	France	14	(6)
- * Club domestic league appearances and goals

Louis Mesnier (15 December 1884 – 8 October 1921) was a French international footballer. He is primarily known for scoring the first international goal for France, which he accomplished in the team's first-ever match against Belgium in 1904. Mesnier finished his international career with 14 appearances and six goals. He also captained the team on four occasions. Domestically, Mesnier played for CA Paris and FC Paris. With Cercle Athlétique, he won the Coupe de France in 1920.
