= 1909 USFSA Football Championship =

Tournament details
- Country: France
- Dates: 7 March – 25 April
- Teams: 17

Final positions
- Champions: SH Marseille (1st title)
- Runners-up: CA Paris

Tournament statistics
- Matches played: 16
- Goals scored: 91 (5.69 per match)

The 1909 USFSA Football Championship was the 16th staging of the USFSA Football Championship. The tournament was held on the road between 7 March and 25 April 1909. The tournament was won by SH Marseille after beating CA Paris 3–2 in the final.

== Tournament ==
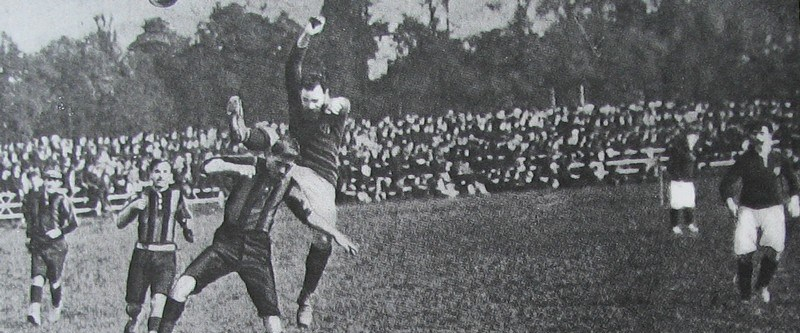
Final : SH Marseille - CA Paris.

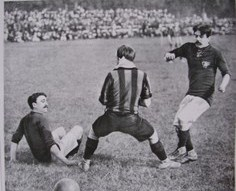
Final : SH Marseille - CA Paris.

=== First round ===
- Stade rennais 11–1 Club Malherbe Caennais

=== 1/8 Finals ===
- Stade rennais 5–1 Le Havre AC
- CA Paris 17–1 Angers Université Club
- FC Lyon 5–2 Racing Club Franc-Comtois de Besançon
- Racing Club de Reims 4–1 Amiens SC
- Stade nantais université club 1–0 Stade toulousain
- US Tourcoing 3–0 Cercle des Sports Stade Lorrain
- Stade Bordelais UC 2–1 Olympique de Cette
- SH Marseille - Stade Raphaëlois (Raphaëlois forfeited)

=== Quarterfinals ===
- CA Paris 8–3 Stade rennais
- Stade Bordelais UC 4–0 Stade nantais université club
- US Tourcoing 3–0 Racing Club de Reims
- SH Marseille 12–0 FC Lyon

=== Semifinals ===
- CA Paris 1–0 US Tourcoing
- SH Marseille - Stade Bordelais UC (Bordeaux forfeited)

=== Final ===
At the time, only clubs from Paris, the North and Normandy had reached the final, so CA Paris reaching the final proves the development of football in Southern France. They found themselves leading two goals to one at half-time, but SH Marseille, who fielded a team with 10 Swiss players and one English men, reversed the situation in the second half thanks to a brace from Widdington, thus winning their first title of champion of France.

25 April 1909

SH Marseille	3–2	CA Paris
Burkhardt; Widdington	Report	Verlet pen.' Devic

Stade du Matin, Colombes
Referee: A. Collier
