= 1910 USFSA Football Championship =

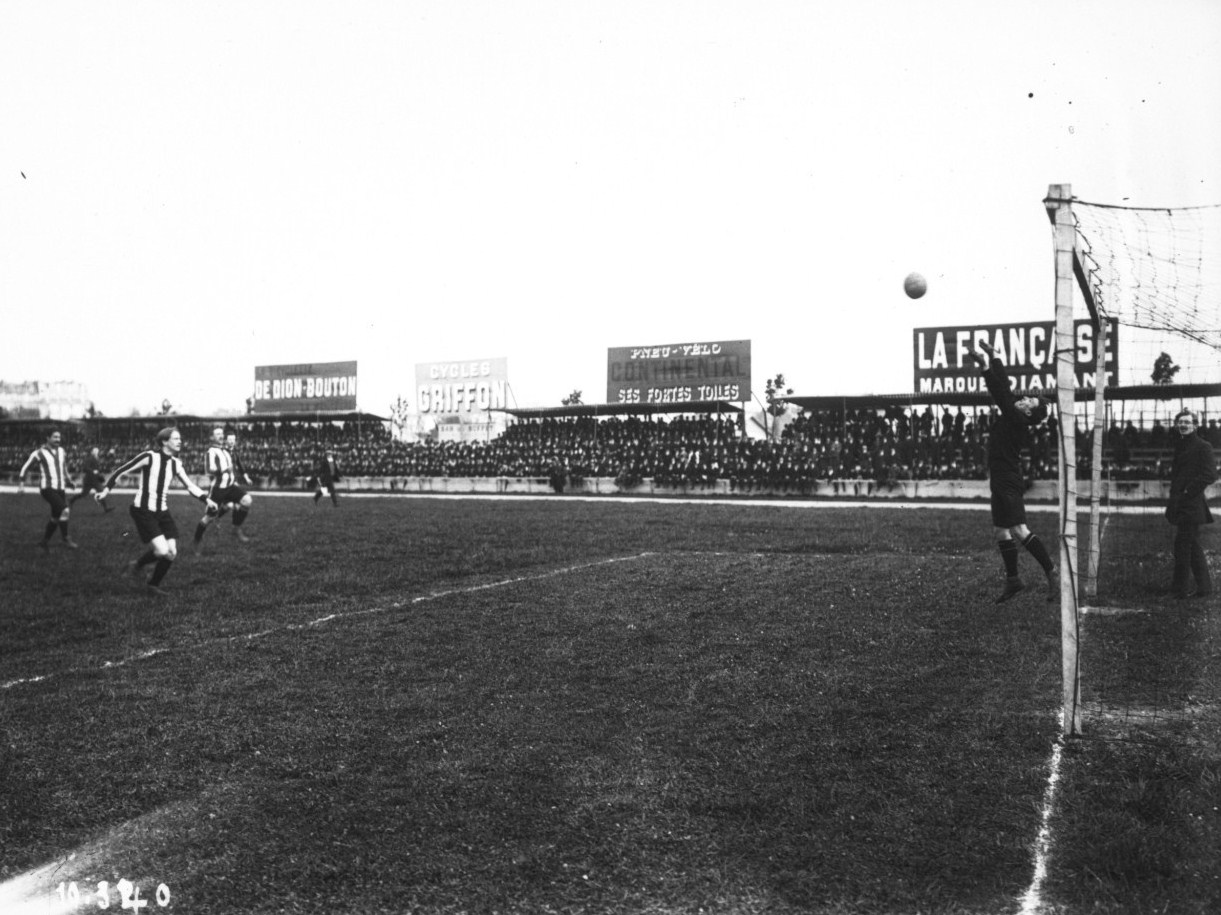

Statistics of the USFSA Football Championship in the 1910 season.

== Tournament ==
=== First round ===
- Cercle des Sports Stade Lorrain 1-1 Racing Club de Reims (match replayed)
- Cercle des Sports Stade Lorrain 2-1 Racing Club de Reims
- Amiens SC 5-0 FC Rouen
- US Le Mans 4-1 Union sportive de Tours
- FC Rouen 6-1 Amiens SC

=== 1/8 Finals ===
- US Tourcoing 5-0 Football club de Braux
- Stade Bordelais UC 3-1 Stade nantais université club
- Olympique de Cette 3-1 Stade toulousain
- SH Marseille 11-0 AS Cannes
- Lyon Olympique 4-1 Racing Club Franc-Comtois de Besançon
- Stade français 3-0 SM Caen
- Union sportive Servannaise 7-1 US Le Mans
- Amiens SC 8-1 Cercle des Sports Stade Lorrain

=== Quarterfinals ===
- Stade Bordelais UC 3-1 Olympique de Cette
- Union sportive Servannaise 2-0 Stade français
- US Tourcoing 5-0 Amiens SC
- SH Marseille 5-0 Lyon Olympique

=== Semifinals ===
- US Tourcoing 3-0 Union sportive Servannaise
- SH Marseille 4-1 Stade Bordelais UC

=== Final ===
- US Tourcoing 7-2 SH Marseille
