= 1911 USFSA Football Championship =

Statistics of the USFSA Football Championship in the 1911 season.

== Tournament ==
=== First round ===
- Racing Club Franc-Comtois de Besançon 0-3 FC International Lyon
- Racing Club de Reims 5-0 Cercle des Sports Stade Lorrain
- Angers Université Club 12-0 Union sportive de Tours
- Amiens SC 1-6 FC Rouen

=== 1/8 Final ===
- RC France 3-1 AS Trouville-Deauville
- Olympique Lillois 8-1 Football club de Braux
- Olympique de Cette 3-1 Stade toulousain
- SH Marseille 9-0 Stade Raphaëlois
- FC International Lyon 2-1 Sporting Club Dauphinois
- .Union sportive Servannaise 0-2 Angers Université Club
- FC Rouen 2-1 Racing Club de Reims
- Sport athlétique bordelais 6-0 Sporting Club angérien

=== Quarterfinals ===
- FC Rouen 4-1 Olympique Lillois
- RC France 1-0 Union sportive Servannaise
- Olympique de Cette 3-0 Sport athlétique bordelais
- FC International Lyon 0-2 SH Marseille

=== Semifinals ===
- Olympique de Cette 0-4 SH Marseille
- FC Rouen 1-2 RC France

=== Final ===
- SH Marseille 3-2 RC France
