= 1913 USFSA Football Championship =

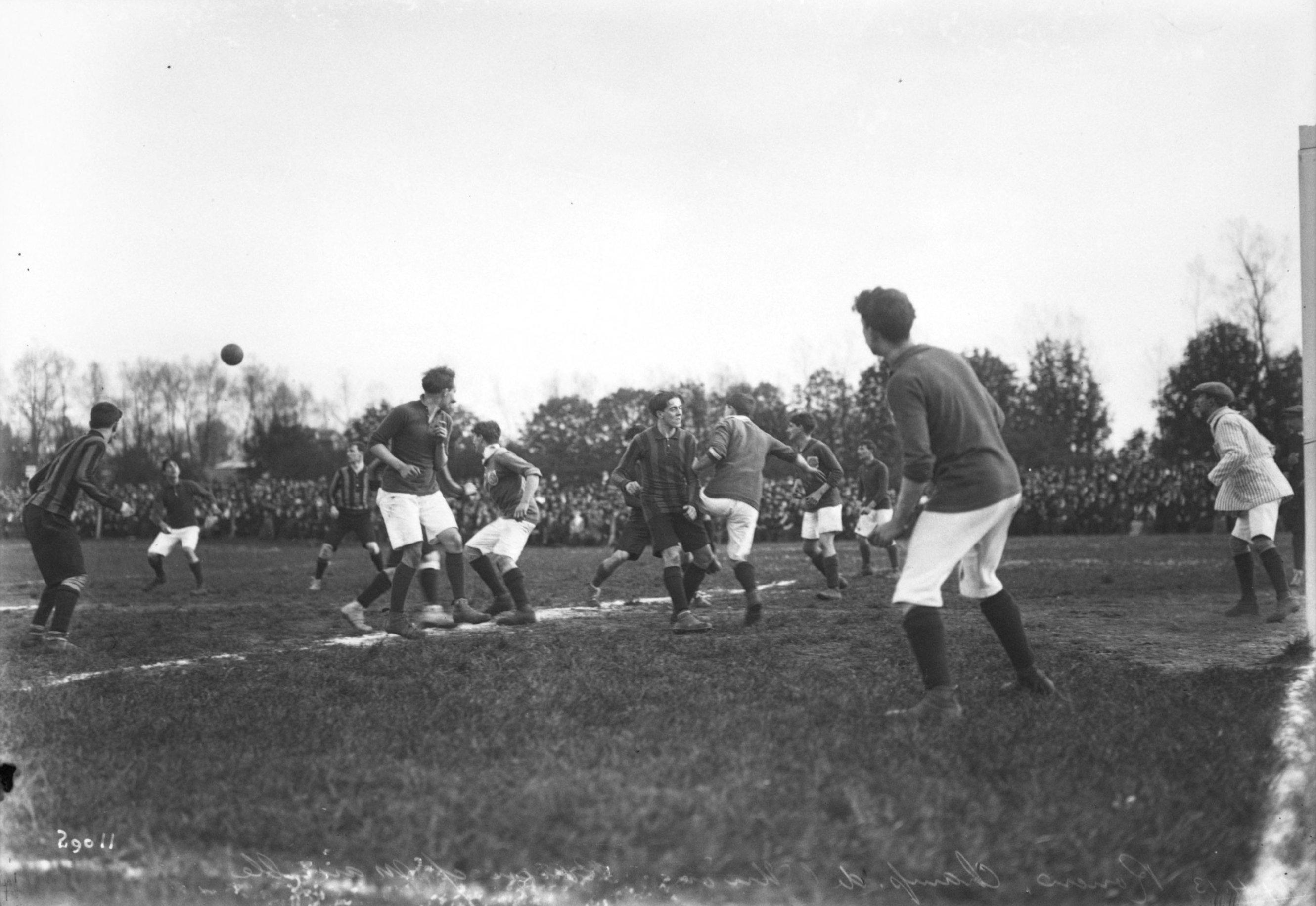
The final of the 1913 USFSA football championship between FC Rouen and SH Marseille.

Statistics of the USFSA Football Championship in the 1913 season.

== Tournament ==
=== First round ===
- Stade Bordelais UC - Stade limousin (forfeit)
- Lyon OU 5-1 Football Club de Grenoble
- Football club de Braux 2-0 Cercle Sportif de Remiremont
- AS Trouville-Deauville 3-1 US Le Mans

=== 1/8 Final ===
- Stade toulousain 1-4 Stade Bordelais UC
- Lyon OU 1-5 Stade Raphaëlois
- Union sportive Servannaise 4-0 CASG Orléans
- Amiens SC 0-1 FC Rouen
- Olympique Lillois 2-0 Football club de Braux
- SH Marseille 15-0 Stade issoirien
- CASG Paris 1-0 AS Trouville-Deauville
- Olympique de Cette - Angers Université Club (forfeit)

=== Quarterfinals ===
- CASG Paris 3-1 Union sportive Servannaise
- Olympique de Cette 6-1 Stade Bordelais UC
- FC Rouen 2-1 Olympique Lillois
- SH Marseille 4-1 Stade Raphaëlois

=== Semifinals ===
- SH Marseille 2-1 Olympique de Cette
- FC Rouen 8-1 CASG Paris

=== Final ===
- SH Marseille 1-0 FC Rouen
