= Stade Helvétique de Marseille =

Stade Helvétique
- Full name: Stade Helvétique de Marseille
- Nickname: Les Helvétiques Les Suisses
- Founded: 22 July 1904
- Dissolved: 1932
- Ground: Stade des Patronages
Home colours

Stade Helvétique de Marseille, commonly abbreviated to Stade Helvétique or SH Marseille, was a French football club founded on 22 July 1904 under the name of La Suisse. On 19 July 1907 the club was renamed to the Stade Helvétique de Marseille. The club was dissolved in 1932 due to the Wall Street crash.

== History ==
The club was created on 22 July 1904 by a committee of the gymnastics from Switzerland who had existed in Marseille for nearly twenty years. They climbed to the first round of the Championnat du Littoral de l'USFSA in 1906 and after some recruits came to reinforce the team in 1908, the Helvétiques finally won their first local title in 1909 and thus played in their first Championnat de France USFSA. In the final, the club won against CA Paris (3–2), giving the strange spectacle of ten Swiss and an Englishman becoming champions of France. This was the first success of a club from Marseille against a Parisian club; the Stade Helvétique then became the leading club from Marseille, thus masking the other clubs in the city, Olympique included.

The following season, the club reached the Championnat de France final, again Their opponents, US Tourcoing, showed no mercy and thrashed the club 7–2.

In 1911, the Club found themselves in the National final again. At the Stade de l'Huveaune, the club beat Racing Club de France 3–2. In 1912, the club lifted its fourth consecutive Littoral title. Stade Raphaëlois, champion of the Côte d'Azur de l'USFSA and National champion that year, eliminated the club in two matches (0–0, 2–1).

In 1913, the club found the lustre of the National finals. Facing FC Rouen, and after extra time, the club won 1–0. This was the third and last USFSA national title for the club. Given the large number of foreigners who made up the team, they were not allowed to participate in the Trophée de France, which brings together the champions of the various federations.

At the last pre-war season, the club was eliminated in the quarterfinals by FC Lyon (3–2). The Great War made a clean sweep in Marseille for Olympique de Marseille who benefitted the most from the legacy of the Stade Helvétique, by making Marseille a football town. The club, like many others, closed its doors in 1914 due to lack of competition and ceased operations in 1916.

The club was restored in 1927 with a change of kit, now wearing the same kit of the Swiss football team, red with a white cross. The club, no longer having its stadium located at the Prado, played its games at the Stade de l'Huveaune or at the Stade Montfuron. The club intended to acquire land in the place of the now Stade Velodrome thanks to a raffle where the ticket was hidden by one of the organizers. The 1929 crisis considerably weakened the Swiss community living in Marseille and led to the final dissolution of the club in 1932.
