= Henri Vascout =

French footballer (1886–1936)

Personal information
- Birth name: Benoni Waskou
- Date of birth: 17 February 1886
- Place of birth: 10th arrondissement of Paris, France
- Date of death: 6 May 1936 (aged 50)
- Place of death: 14th arrondissement of Paris, France
- Height: 1.64 m (5 ft 5 in)
- Position: Midfielder

Senior career*
Years	Team	Apps	(Gls)
1909–1912	CA Vitry		
1912–1913	Red Star		
1913–1914	CA Vitry		
1915–1919	Stade Rennais		
1919–1922	CA Vitry		

International career
1910–1911	France	7	(0)
1912–1913	Paris	2	(0)
- * Club domestic league appearances and goals

Henri Vascout (né Benoni Waskou; 17 February 1886 – 6 May 1936) was a French footballer who played as a midfielder for CA Vitry and the French national team in the 1910s.

== Early life ==
Benoni Waskou was born in the 10th arrondissement of Paris on 17 February 1886, (Note: Some sources state that he was born in 1885.) to an unknown father and Marie-Marguerite Waskou (1856–?), (Note: Waskou is most likely an abbreviation of a more complex name, such as Waskowski or even of Waskowicz, similar to how Raymond Kopa was an abbreviation of Kopaszewski.) a seamstress who was a descendant of a family originally from Poland, specifically Lwow (currently known as Lviv). His mother had four children, all out of wedlock, with Benoni being the youngest, while his mother's older sister, Marie-Louise Vaskou, (Note: It remains unclear why the sisters have differences in the spelling of their surnames.) had no children, despite being married. It was perhaps because of this that in 1907, Benoni was adopted by his aunt, with the surname "Vaskou" being later Frenchitized as Vascout.

Vascout was born into a very Catholic family, and likewise, all of his family members have Christian first names, including his half brothers and sisters; Benoni, however, is Jewish, which implies that his unknown father was Jewish as well. Bothered by his first name, he decided to change it to Henri, which was a personal choice from either his adoptive mother or him.

== Club career ==
Vascout began his career at CA Vitry, which was affiliated with the FCAF. Together with Simon Sollier and Étienne Jourde, he was a member of the CA Vitry team that won back-to-back FCAF Championships in 1910 and 1911, which qualified the club to compete in the Trophée de France, reaching the 1910 final, which they lost 0–2 to Patronage Olier. Throughout his career, the local press often wrongly misspelled his surname as Vaskou or even Waskou.

Vascout stayed at CA Vitry for three years, from 1909 until 1912, when he moved to Red Star, with whom he played for one season. In 1913, he returned to Vitry, where he quickly became the team's captain. Despite being only 1.64 meters, he was a very combative and aggressive player, who was capable of passing accurately; for instance, he once scored from 25 meters. During the First World War, he was stationed in Brittany, where he played with Stade Rennais for four years, from 1915 until 1919. During this period, he was described by the press as "marvelous", "phenomenal", and even "the best was still and always Vascout".

Together with Lucien Leclercq, Charles Robert Ruesch, and George Scoones, he was a member of the Stade Rennais team that won the Coupe des Alliés in 1915–16, a knockout competition contested during World War I, starting in both the semifinals, a 3–0 victory over Le Havre, and in the final, helping his side to a 7–1 trashing of CS Terreaux. Two years later, he helped Stade Rennais reach the semifinals of the 1918–19 Coupe de France, which ended in a 4–3 loss to CASG Paris; the local press highlighted him as one of the team's best players.

In 1919, Vascout returned to CA Vitry, with whom he played for a further three years, until 1922, when he retired, aged 36.

== International career ==
On 16 April 1910, the 24-year-old Vascout made his international debut for France in a friendly match against England amateurs in Brighton, which ended in a 10–1 loss. The following month, on 15 May, he made his second appearance in a friendly against Italy in Milan, which ended in another heavy loss (6–2). In 1911, Vascout earned a further five caps for a total of seven, helping his side to only one victory, against Luxembourg on 29 October 1911.

In December 1912, Vascout was selected to play for a Paris selection (LFA) in a friendly against a London XI, which ended in a 0–2 loss. On 1 November 1913, he played for Paris in a friendly against a London League XI, scoring an own goal in a 0–5 loss. A few weeks later, on 28 November, he was suspended "for life" after "shoving" a referee, whose mother hit him with an umbrella. Despite the life ban, he was retained, and a few years later, in 1917, he was selected to play a friendly against Switzerland in Geneva on 27 November, but the Swiss backed out at the last minute.

== Death and legacy ==
Vascout died in the 14th arrondissement of Paris on 6 May 1936, at the age of 50. In his obituary, he was described as "belonging to that generation of robust, hard-working footballers, with unfailing stamina, and who were never found wanting".

== Honours ==
CA Vitry

- FCAF Championships
  - Champions (2): 1910 and 1911
- Trophée de France:
  - Runner-up (1): 1910
