= George Scoones =

English footballer and manager

Personal information
- Full name: George William Scoones Senior
- Date of birth: 9 June 1886
- Place of birth: Saint Helier, Jersey
- Date of death: 27 January 1940 (aged 53)
- Position: Midfielder

Senior career*
Years	Team	Apps	(Gls)
1912–1922	Rennes	87	(20)
Total		87	(20)

Managerial career
- 1920–1922: Rennes
- * Club domestic league appearances and goals

George William Scoones (9 June 1886 – 27 January 1940) was an English professional footballer who played as a midfielder for Stade Rennais and who later became its manager.

== Career ==
Born on 9 June 1886 in Saint Helier, one of the twelve parishes of Jersey, Scoones moved to the Brittany in the early 1910s, where he joined the ranks of Stade Rennais, with whom he played for a full decade, from 1912 until 1922. In total, he scored 20 goals in over 80 appearances.

At the time, the figure of the coach as we know it today did not yet exist, so it was Scoones, as a connoisseur of the much more advanced English football, who dictated the tactics to be followed and made up the line-ups, going as far as giving "theoretical lectures on association football and its rules" to all the players in the club's ranks. When the First World War broke out in 1914, most of his teammates were mobilized to the front, but Scoones remained in Brittany due to his status as a British citizen, becoming the captain of Rennes' weakened squad.

Together with Lucien Leclercq, Charles Robert Ruesch, and Henri Vascout, he was a member of the Stade Rennais team that won the Coupe des Alliés in 1915–16, a knockout competition contested during World War I, starting in the final against CS Terreaux on 4 June, helping his side to a 7–1 victory. The following year, on 13 May 1917, he captained Rennais to the final of the 1916–17 LFA Interfederal Cup, in which he scored a goal "after a spectacular run" in an eventual 2–1 loss to AS Française. His goal was very contested, being definitively validated only after a five-minute discussion between the referee and the linesman.

In February 1918, he had to return to England to carry out his military service with the British Army. It was not until January 1919, nearly a full year later, that he played another match for Rennes. He then played a crucial role in helping Stade Rennais Rennes win back-to-back regional titles in 1919 and 1920, as well as reaching the semifinals of the 1918–19 Coupe de France, which ended in a 4–3 loss to CASG Paris; the local press highlighted him as one of his team's best players.

In 1920, Scoones began working as Rennes' player-coach, a position that he held for two years, until 1922. Under his leadership, the club reached the 1922 Coupe de France final, which ended in a 2–0 loss to Red Star. At the end of the second-half, both he and Red Star's Raoul Marion were sent off by the referee. In total, he oversaw Rennes in 32 matches, which ended in 22 victories, 5 draws, and 5 losses.

== Death and legacy ==
Scoones died on 27 January 1940, at the age of 53.

Scoones had at least one son, George William Scoones, also born in Saint Helier, on 18 November 1910, and he also played for Stade Rennais in the mid-1930s.

== Honours ==
Stade Rennais

- Coupe des Alliés:
  - Champions: 1915–16
- Interfederal Cup
  - Runner-up (1): 1916–17
- Brittany Football League:
  - Champions (2): 1919 and 1920
- Coupe de France:
  - Runner-up (1): 1921–22

== Bibliography ==
- Loire, Claude (1998). Le Stade rennais, fleuron du football breton [Stade Rennais, the flagship of Breton football] (in French). Apogée. ISBN 2-84398-000-3.
