= Étienne Jourde =

French footballer (1891-1921)

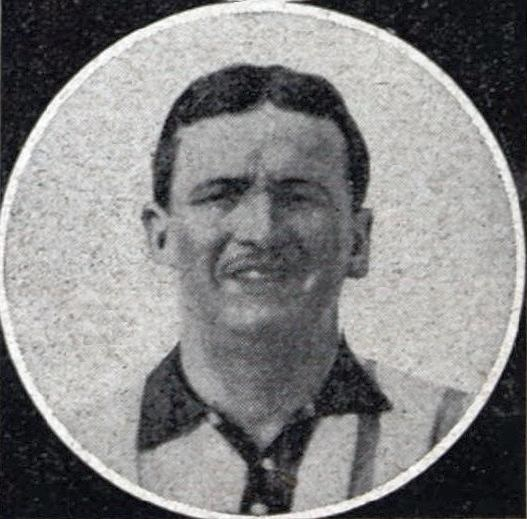
- Jourde in 1914

Personal information
- Full name: Étienne Jean Jourde
- Date of birth: 13 August 1891
- Place of birth: 13th arrondissement of Paris, France
- Date of death: 20 October 1921 (aged 30)
- Place of death: Bordeaux, France
- Height: 1.70 m (5 ft 7 in)
- Position: Striker

Senior career*
Years	Team	Apps	(Gls)
1909–1912	CA Vitry		
1912–1913	CASG Paris		
1916–1921	VGA Médoc		

International career
1910–1914	France	8	(1)
- * Club domestic league appearances and goals

Étienne Jean Jourde (13 August 1891 – 20 October 1921) was a French footballer who played as a striker for CASG Paris, CA Vitry, and VGA Médoc. He also played eight matches for the French national team between 1910 and 1914. He is one of six players to captain the team on his debut, and remains the youngest captain of the French team at the age of 20 years and 3 months.

== Early life ==
Étienne Jourde was born on 13 August 1891 in the 13th arrondissement of Paris, as the son of Baptiste Jourde and Marie Comte, living in the capital, at 24 rue du Moulin-des-Prés. Outside of football, Jourde worked as a photoengraver.

== Footballing career ==
Jourde began his football career at CA Vitry in 1909, when the club moved from USFSA to FCAF, which allowed him to play a leading role, and he was not yet 19 when he won the FCAF Championship in 1910. This victory allowed the club to compete in the CFI's Trophée de France, reaching the final in 1910, which they lost 0–2 to Patronage Olier.

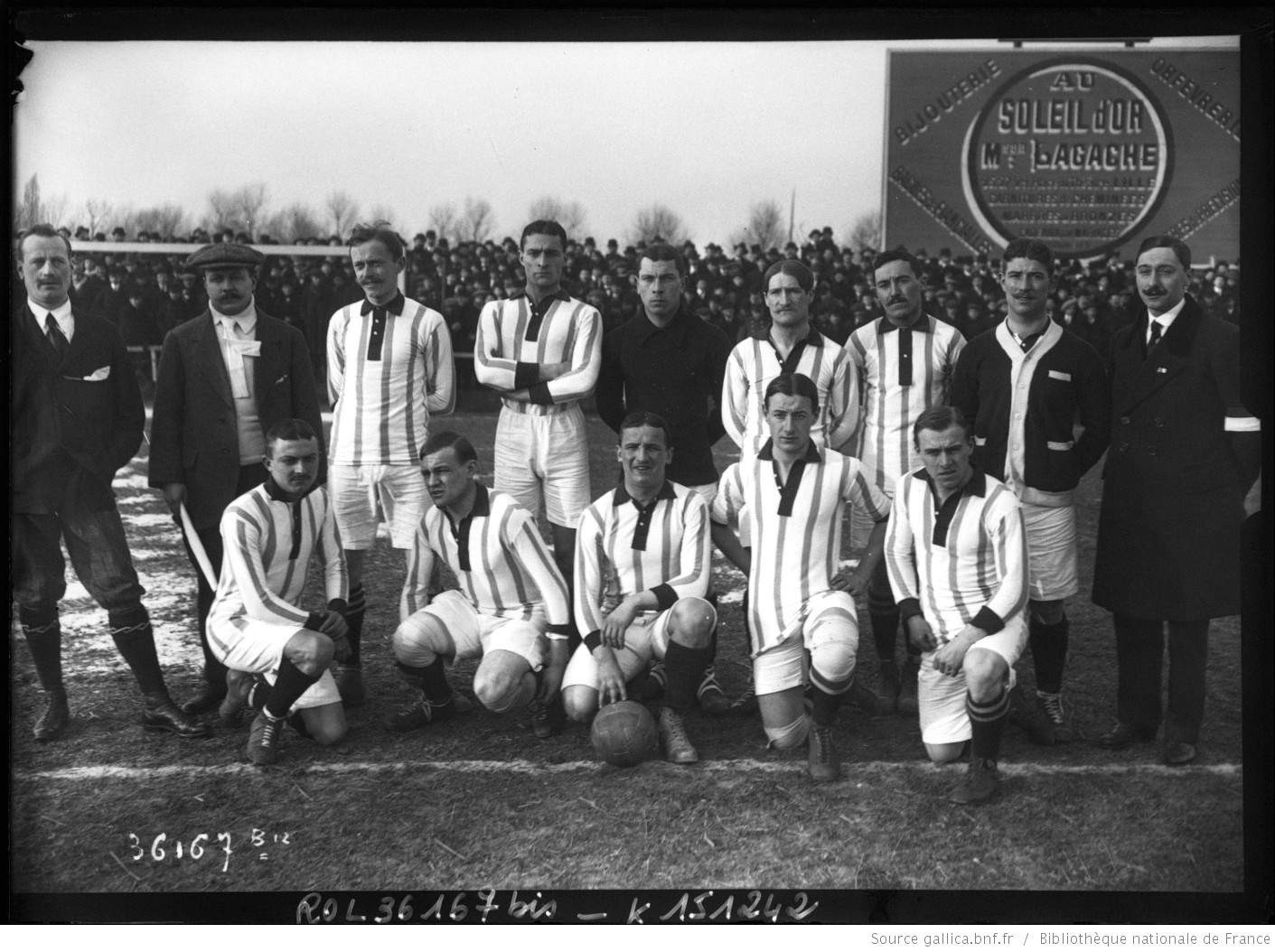
Jourde (third player crouching, holding the ball) with the French team in 1914.

This resulted in the CFI opening the doors of the French national team to the 20-year-old Jourde, who played his first international match in a friendly against Belgium on 3 April 1910, captaining his side to a 4–0 loss, thus becoming one of only six players to captain the team on his debut, and in doing so at the age of 20 years and 3 months, he also became the youngest captain of the French team, a record that he still holds. In his fifth appearance for France on 17 March 1912, Jourde helped his team achieve its first-ever win over Italy (4–3). He was named in France's squad for the football tournament at the 1912 Summer Olympics, but the French side withdrew from the competition.

Jourde had to wait nearly two years for his next cap on 25 January 1914, in a friendly against Belgium, with his selection being heavily criticized by chauvinistic northern journalists who wanted Albert Eloy in his place, but perhaps because of that, Jourde delivered his best match with a French jersey, scoring two goals (one having been wrongly attributed to Henri Bard) and providing an assist to help his side to a 4–3 win; he who until then had never managed to score or provide an assist. In total, he played eight matches for France, three times as a midfielder (right or left), three times as a winger (left), and twice as a center forward. Blocked at center forward by Eugène Maës, at midfielder by Louis Mesnier or Ernest Gravier, and on the wing by Marcel Triboulet, and then Raymond Dubly, Jourde still found a way to find his own little place, without inspiring enthusiasm, but without disappointing either.

== Military career ==
Jourde was called up for the First World War as a conscript of the class of 1912, joining the 19th Battalion of Foot Chasseurs on 2 August 1914 and being wounded in the right thigh twice (21 August 1914 and 21 February 1916), which caused his switch to the still fledgling aviation. It was during a training course at the Cazaux base that he decided to leave Paris, where he worked as a photoengraver, and settle in Aquitaine, where he retrained in the sale of wines and spirits. Having become a licensed pilot, he was piloting a B11 on the front when he was shot down between the lines in August 1918, but thanks to his composure, however, he was able to get out of this situation unscathed. It was reported that "he sworn to make the Boches pay dearly for this mishap; having already two Boches to his credit".

Jourde played with VGA Médoc for five years, from 1916 until he died in 1921. During the 1919–20 Coupe de France, VGAM knocked out Montpellier and CASG Paris to reach the semifinals, which ended in a 1–2 loss to the eventual champions CA Paris.

== Death ==
Jourde died at the Pellegrin Hospice in Bordeaux, following an emergency operation that went wrong, on 20 October 1921, at the age of just 30, and was buried in Arcachon.

One of his teammates at CA Vitry, Henri Vialmonteil, exercised the same profession (photoengraver), played alongside him in their 4–3 win over Italy, and was also diminished by injuries and had a premature death in 1937, at the age of 44. However, they were very different players: Jourde was hard-working and valiant, but not very talented, while Vialmonteil was brilliant and gifted, but inconsistent.

== Honours ==
CA Vitry

- FCAF Championship:
  - Champions (2): 1910 and 1911
- Trophée de France:
  - Runner-up (1): 1910
