= 1915–16 Coupe des Alliés =

Tournament details
- Country: France (USFSA)
- Teams: 16

Final positions
- Champions: Stade Rennais (1st title)
- Runners-up: CS Terreaux

Tournament statistics
- Matches played: 15
- Goals scored: 59 (3.93 per match)

The 1915–16 Coupe des Alliés (English: 1915–16 Allied Cup) was the second edition of the Coupe des Alliés, a knockout football competition contested by French clubs during the First World War. It was organized by the Union des Sociétés Françaises de Sports Athlétiques (USFSA) and won by Stade Rennais, who defeated CS Terreaux 7–1 in the final.

== Overview ==
The second edition of the competition was contested by the winners of 8 regional championships, which means that the finals of those championships were therefore the round of 16 of the Coupe des Alliés. One side of the bracket was contested by the clubs of Western France and Paris, while the other half was made up of clubs from Eastern France, mostly from the region of Provence-Alpes-Côte d'Azur due to the war zones near the border with Germany.

=== Western France and Paris ===
In the final of the Paris zone, Red Star Amical Club and CASG Paris drew at 1, but Red Star refused to play extra time because three of its players had to return to work in their arms factory, so CASG was declared the winner. In the final of the Normandy region, Le Havre defeated FC Rouen by an unknown score, while the Northwestern region (Brittany/Pays de la Loire) was won by Stade Rennais after beating Union Sportive Raonnaise in December 1915; Armoricaine de Brest on 8 January; and then US Le Mans 4–1 in the final. In the final of the Southwestern region (Occitania/Nouvelle-Aquitaine), VGA Médoc defeated Stade Toulousain 8–0. In the quarterfinals, VGA Médoc was set to face Stade Rennais in Nantes, but the match ended up taking place in Bordeaux, with Rennais winning 2–0. The other quarterfinal was contested by the champions of Paris and Normandy, which ended in a 4–2 win to the latter, thus setting a semifinal between Le Havre and Stade Rennais.

=== Eastern France ===
The participation of clubs from the East of France was much more limited because of the War, so only two regional committees entered the tournament, Rhône-Alpes and Provence-Alpes-Côte d'Azur. The only known fact from the latter championship is the winner, a club called International FC Nice, while the semifinals of the Rhône-Alpes championship were contested by three clubs from Lyon and one from Marseille. In the first semifinal on 11 January, FC Lyon scored the opening goal in the 5th minute via Mortier, but ended up losing 2–4 to CS Terreaux. The second semifinal on 12 January was a Choc des Olympiques, in which Olympique de Marseille led Olympique Lyonnais 2–0 at half-time, but then Lyon's best player, the forward Joseph Delvecchio, had to leave because of an injury, and since there were no substitutions at the time, Lyon had to play the rest of the match with 10 men and ended up suffering a resounding 9–1 loss. In the Rhône-Alpes final, Terreaux defeated Marseille by a score of 4–2.

=== Top four ===
In the semifinals of the tournament, Stade Rennais scored three first-half goals against Le Havre to seal a 3–0 win on 14 May 1916, with the French newspaper L'Ouest-Eclair describing it as a "victory for Stade Rennais and Brittany". In the other semifinal, CS Terreaux defeated FC Nice by a score of 2–1. On 3 June, in the eve of the final, Stade Rennais defeated US Servannaise 8–0, thus finishing the season with 20 victories out of 19, and with a total of 125 goals scored and only 14 conceded, including five wins at the Coupe des Alliés, with 20 goals scored and only 1 conceded.

In the final, Stade Rennais played in red jerseys with black facings and was captained by Scoones, who led his team to a comfortable 7–1 victory over CS Terreaux, with L'Auto stating that the best player on the field was the forward "Leclercq, without a shadow of a doubt", while Terreaux's best players were the David brothers and André Bellon. The final was refereed by the Belgian Lebrun, whose work was described as "impeccable" and led "to general satisfaction". A local newspaper from Côtes-du-Nord described the success obtained by Stade Rennais as a "Breton victory", while also delivering a particularly flattering portrait of the flagship team of the capital, stating "it can currently be considered the most select and best organized provincial club".

=== Results ===
Round of 16
February 1916 – Parc des Sports, Sannois
(Brittany) Stade Rennais	4
US Le Mans	1
11 January 1916 – Bordeaux
(Aquitaine) VGA Médoc	8
(Toulouse) Stade Toulousain	0
10 April 1916 – Paris
CASG Paris	1
(Paris) Red Star Amical Club	1
? 1916 –
(Normandy) Le Havre	?
(Normandy) FC Rouen	?
? 1916 – ?
International FC Nice	?
?	?
? 1916 – ?
?	?
?	?
12 January 1916 – Marseille
Olympique de Marseille	9
Olympique de Lyon	1
11 January 1916 – Lyon
FC Lyon	2
(Lyon) CS Terreaux	4

Quarter-finals
March 1916 – Bordeaux
(Brittany) Stade Rennais	2
(Aquitaine) VGA Médoc	0
30 April 1916 – Sanvic
CASG Paris	2
(Normandy) Le Havre	4
? 1916 – ?
International FC Nice	?
?	?
13 February 1916 – Lyon
Olympique de Marseille	2
(Lyon) CS Terreaux	4

Semi-finals
14 May 1916 – ?
(Brittany) Stade Rennais	3
(Normandy) Le Havre	0
? 1916 – Lyon
International FC Nice	1
(Lyon) CS Terreaux	2

Final
4 June 1916 – Stade Jean-Bouin, Paris
(Brittany) Stade Rennais	7
(Lyon) CS Terreaux	1

=== Quarter-finals ===
30 April 1916

(Normandy) Le Havre	4 – 2 (a.e.t.)	CASG Paris
Louivert (1–0) (2–2) (3–2) (4–2)	Report	Bard (1–1); Bouillon (1–2)

Sanvic, Le Havre, Normandy
Referee: Monsieur Labat

Note: After 90 minutes, the game was tied at 1, with Paris scoring its second goal in extra time, but then Le Havre scored three goals in quick succession to seal the win.

=== Semi-final ===
? 1916

(Lyon) CS Terreaux	2 – 1	International FC Nice
??	Report	?

14 May 1916

(Brittany) Stade Rennais	3 – 0	(Normandy) Le Havre
Dayot - Claise, Betfert - Ruesch, Vascout, Bétrancourt - van Ramdouck, Ory, Gauvin, Leclercq, Moulin	Report	Frémont - Corlay, Herremann - Léibar, Lemaire, Steinhauser - Accard, Louivert, Verhaege, Ollivier, Mevel

Attendance: About 300
Referee: M. Slawick

=== Final ===
4 June 1916
15:00

(Brittany) Stade Rennais	7 – 1	(Lyon) CS Terreaux
? Dayot - Claise, Betfert - Scoones, Vascout, Bétrancourt - van Ramdouck, Ory, Gauvin, Leclercq, Moulin	Report1; Report2	? G. David - F. David, Déléard - Morel, Bellon, Rossier - Chapelle, Jacquelin, Chapuis, Menchetti, Béraud

Stade Jean-Bouin, Bois de Boulogne, Paris
Attendance: About 1500
Referee: M. Lebrun
