= 1916–17 LFA Interfederal Cup =

Tournament details
- Country: France (LFA)
- Teams: 3

Final positions
- Champions: AS Française (1st title)
- Runners-up: Stade Rennais

The 1916–17 LFA Interfederal Cup (French: 1916–17 Coupe interfédérale) was a football competition organized by the Ligue de Football Association (LFA) between the champions of each federation that makes up the said committee. It has the particularity of being open to all associations, and the press of the time considers the competition as the "real French war championship". It was won by AS Française, who defeated Stade Rennais 2–1 in the final.

== Paris ==
=== First round ===
AS Amicale, USA Clichy, Enghien Sports, CA Boulonnais, CA Vitry, CA XIVe, and US Suisse were exempt from the first round.

The first round matches are:

15 October 1916	JA de Saint-Ouen	0 – 3	Gallia Club
			Nicolas; Bel

15 October 1916	AS Française	2 – 1	Olympique de Plantin	Stadium de la rue Olivier-de-Serres, Paris
14 h 30				Attendance: 500

15 octobre 1916	Étoile des deux lacs	2 – 4	Racing Club de France
	? ?		Trentesaux; Motthey; Carlier

15 October 1916	Club sportif des Sourds-Muets	0 – 24	CA Paris

15 October 1916	Club Français	Forfeit.	Stade Français

15 October 1916	Red Star	1 – 2	CASG Paris
	Charles		Tremblay; Dateda	Referee: Géo Napier

15 October 1916	Paris Star	2 – 1	Stadium athlétique de Paris
				Referee: M. Neuens

15 October 1916	Étoile sportive de Saint-Maur	5 – 0	Margarita Club du Vésinet

15 October 1916	Club sportif des Epinettes	0 – 4	Union sportive de l'Île-Saint-Denis
				Referee: M. Plagnes

=== Second round ===
1 November 1916	Gallia Club	0 – 5	AS Française	Parc des Princes, Paris
14 h 30		.

1 November 1916	CA Paris	4 – 2	Racing Club de France	Stade de Charentonneau, Maisons-Alfort.
		.

1 November 1916	Stade Français	5 – 0	AS Amicale	Saint-Cloud

1 November 1916	USA Clichy	6 – 3	Enghien Sports	Clichy
		.

1 November 1916	CA Boulonnais	3 – 1	CA Vitry	Vitry-sur-Seine

1 November 1916	CA XIVe	1 – 6	US Suisse	Le Chevaleret, Ivry

1 November 1916	CASG Paris	4 – 0	Paris Star	Stadium Jean-Bouin, Paris
14 h 30

1 November 1916	ES Saint-Maur	4 – 2	US Île-Saint-Denis	Saint-Maur-des-Fossés

=== Quarts de Final ===
31 December 1916	CA Paris	1 – 3	AS Française	Stade de Charentonneau, Maisons-Alfort
14 h 15				Referee: R. Boulton

31 December 1916	Stade Français	3 – 2	USA Clichy	La Faisanderie, Saint-Cloud
14 h 15

31 December 1916	CA Boulonnais	5 – 3	US Suisse	Stadium de Saint-Ouen
14 h 15

31 December 1916	CASG Paris	4 – 1	ES Saint-Maur	Stadium Jean-Bouin, Paris
14 h 15

=== Semi-Finals ===
22 April 1917	AS Française	3 – 2	Stade Français	La Faisanderie, Saint-Cloud
14 h 30

18 February 1917	CASG Paris	8 – 0	CA Boulonnais	Stadium Jean-Bouin

=== Final ===
29 April 1917	AS Française	4 – 1	CASG Paris	Stadium de la rue Olivier-de-Serres, Paris
14 h 45				Referee: Géo Napier

== Province ==
=== First round ===
The LFA established the schedule for the first round in September 1916. For the first provincial round played on October 15, 1916, the Terreaux Sports Club, the Albert Football Club Vernon, Le Havre AC and the Stade Toulousain are exempt.

15 October 1916	International FC Nice	5 – 0	Racing Club de Toulon	Parc des Sports, Rennes

15 October 1916	Olympique de Marseille	3 – 0	Racing Club de Marseille	Stadium de l'Huveaune, Marseille
				Referee: M. Lamy

15 October 1916	Football Club Nîmois	2 – 1	Football Union Nîmois	Nîmes

15 October 1916	VGA Médoc	forfeit	Bons Gars de Bordeaux
				Referee: M. Castan
Note: An unofficial match took place despite the withdrawal of the Bons Gars de Bordeaux, ending with a 5-0 victory for VGA Médoc.

15 October 1916	Arago sport orléanais	forfeit	Gambetta Club orléanais

15 October 1916	Stade Rennais	5 – 1	US Le Mans	Rennes
			Tessier	Attendance: 1000; Referee: Tommy Peree

15 October 1916	Amiens AC	5 – 1	Stadium amiénois	Amiens

15 October 1916	Le Havre Sports	2 – 2	Patronage Laïque Havrais	Le Havre

=== Second round ===
The second round matches are:

1 November 1916	Stade Rennais	21 – 0	Gambetta Club orléanais	Rennes

19 November 1916	Le Havre AC	2 – 0	Le Havre Sports
	? Leiber

1 November 1916	Amiens AC	–	Albert Football Club de Vernon	Paris

12 November 1916	VGA Médoc	–	Stadium toulousain	Parc du Jard, Mérignac

1 November 1916	CS Terreaux	8 – 0	FC Nîmes	Lyon
	Flauguais; Menchetti; Chapelle			Referee: M. Méru

Contrary to the Interfederal Cup regulations, which provide extra time during a draw, the Olympique de Marseille - International Football Club de Nice match was replayed. Since International FC de Nice was half an hour late, the Marseille team would not have been able to take the last train to Marseille.

19 November 1916	International FC Nice	2 – 2	Olympique de Marseille	Nice
	? ?		René Scheibenstock ?

24 December 1916	Olympique de Marseille	3 – 0	International FC Nice	Stadium de l'Huveaune, Marseille
				Referee: (England) Private Daniels
Note: Match replayed. The first match ended in a draw.

=== Quarter finals ===
The quarter-finals only concern clubs from the West of France. Olympique de Marseille and Club sportif des Terreaux, representatives of the East of France, meet directly in the semi-finals.

17 December 1916	Amiens AC	0 – 0	Le Havre AC	Stadium Brancion, Vanves

21 January 1917	Le Havre AC	3 – 0	Amiens AC	Terrain de Sanvic, Le Havre
14 h 45	Louiver; Leiber; Lang			Referee: Géo Napier

21 January 1917	Stade Rennais	Forfeit	VGA Médoc

=== Semi-Finals ===
31 December 1916	Olympique de Marseille	1 – 0	CS Terreaux	Stadium de l'Huveaune, Marseille
		·		Referee: (England) Private Daniels

18 February 1917	Stade Rennais	4 – 3	Le Havre AC	Stadium de Saint-Ouen
14 h 15

=== Provincial final ===
Olympique de Marseille forfeits, due to refusal of permissions in the Marseille squad, despite a request for postponement from the club, rejected by the LFA.

18 March 1917	Stade Rennais	Forfeit	Olympique de Marseille	Stade de Charentonneau, Maisons-Alfort.

== National final ==
The Interfederal Cup final saw AS Française, winner of the Paris region, face Stade Rennais, winner of the provincial final, at the Stade de la rue Olivier-de-Serres in Paris.

13 May 1927 Final	AS Française	2 – 1	Stade Rennais	Stadium de la rue Olivier-de-Serres, Paris
15 h 25	Soïka; Handjian (pen.)		George Scoones	Referee: Géo Napier
