= Henri Vialmonteil =

French footballer (1892-1937)

Personal information
- Full name: Henri Antoine Viallemonteil
- Date of birth: 2 April 1892
- Date of death: 16 January 1937 (aged 44)
- Position: Forward

Senior career*
Years	Team	Apps	(Gls)
1909–1911	Etoile Sportive du XIIIème		
1911–1914	CA Vitry		

International career
1911–1913	France	6	(2)
1912	Paris	1	(0)
1915–1916	France (unofficial)	4	(3)
- * Club domestic league appearances and goals

Henri Antoine Viallemonteil (2 April 1892 – 16 January 1937) was a French footballer who played as a forward for CA Vitry and the French national team from 1910 to 1914, scoring two goals in six matches for the latter.

Vialmonteil was widely regarded as one of the most technically gifted French players of the early 20th century, being compared to the likes of Matthias Sindelar or Héctor Scarone.

== Footballing career ==
=== Early career ===
Vialmonteil began his football career at Etoile Sportive du XIIIème before moving to CA Vitry for the 1911–12 season. Due to his name being too long, he was initially often called Vial, until Félix Vial became a regular in the same club. On 8 December 1912, Vialmonteil played for a Paris selection (LFA) in a friendly match against a London XI.

On 29 October 1911, the 19-year-old Vialmonteil made his international debut for France in a friendly match against Luxembourg, scoring once to help his side to a 4–1 victory. In his fourth international appearance in Turin on 17 March 1912, Jourde helped his team achieve its first-ever win over Italy (4–3). He was named in France's squad for the football tournament at the 1912 Summer Olympics, but the French side withdrew from the competition. In the rematch against Italy in Saint-Ouen on 12 January 1913, France won again (1–0), with Vialmonteil providing the game-winning assist to Eugène Maës. In total, he played six matches for France, and only lost once.

=== Later career ===
A fall from a horse in April 1913 broke both his leg and his career, because the fracture took a long time to heal, but this did not bring only disadvantages, because Viallemonteil, as a result, escaped military service, thus escaping being assigned to the front, because the bone callus on his right leg worried the review board. He was eventually able to return to the fields, moving from club to club, as the French Interfederal Committee (CFI) regulations allowed during the War: Red Star FC, CA Paris, and Club Français.

In January 1915, he played two matches for a France-Belgium representative team against Italy, scoring one goal in both games (6–2 loss, and 2–3 win). On 12 March 1916, Vialmonteil, alongside Darques, Henri Bard, and Marcel Triboulet, played for France in an unofficial match against Belgium, which ended in a 1–4 loss. He was also a member of the FCAF team that contested the Journées du Poilu Sportif in 1916, scoring a penalty kick against the USFSA team in the quarterfinals on 22 April, in an eventual 2–6 loss.

At the end of the War, Viallemonteil returned to his old club of Vitry, and despite being a little thicker and slower, he played there until 1922. Shortly after retiring, he became a photoengraver for the French newspaper Le Miroir des sports.

=== Playing style ===
Vialmonteil was a brilliant passer, operating behind the attack line, but he was also quite capable of scoring. In 1912, he was described as having "a scientific game", although he could "disappoint his supporters with his slowness". In the weekly Le Plein Air, he was even openly criticized for succumbing to the temptation of personal play: "Extremely confident in his knowledge of dribbling, he passed one or two opponents, but always found a third or fourth to block his path. And there was nothing to be done to make him see reason!".

== Death ==
Vialmonteil died very suddenly from a heart attack at home, on 16 January 1937, at the age of 44.

One of his teammates at CA Vitry, Étienne Jourde, exercised the same profession (photoengraver), played alongside him in their 4–3 win over Italy, and was also diminished by injuries and had a premature death in 1921, at the age of 30. However, they were very different players: Jourde was hard-working and valiant, but not very talented, while Vialmonteil was brilliant and gifted, but inconsistent.

== Career statistics ==
=== International goals ===
France score listed first, score column indicates score after each Vialmonteil goal.

List of international goals scored by Henri Vialmonteil
No.	Date	Venue	Opponent	Score	Result	Competition
1	29 October 1911	Stade Achille Hammerel, Luxembourg City, Luxembourg	Luxembourg	1–1	4–1	Friendly match
2	18 February 1912	Stade de Paris, Saint-Ouen, France	Switzerland	4–0	4–1	Friendly match

=== International (unofficial) goals ===
France score listed first, score column indicates score after each Vialmonteil goal.

List of international goals scored by Henri Vialmonteil
No.	Date	Venue	Opponent	Score	Result	Competition
1	1 January 1915	Arena Civica, Milan, Italy	Italy	1–3	2–6	Friendly match
2	3 January 1915	Piazza d'armi, Turin, Italy	Italy	1–0	3–2	Friendly match
3	22 April 1916	Stade Brancion, Paris, France	(France) USFSA	?	2–6	Journées du Poilu Sportif quarterfinal
