= Eugène Maës =

French footballer (1890–1945)

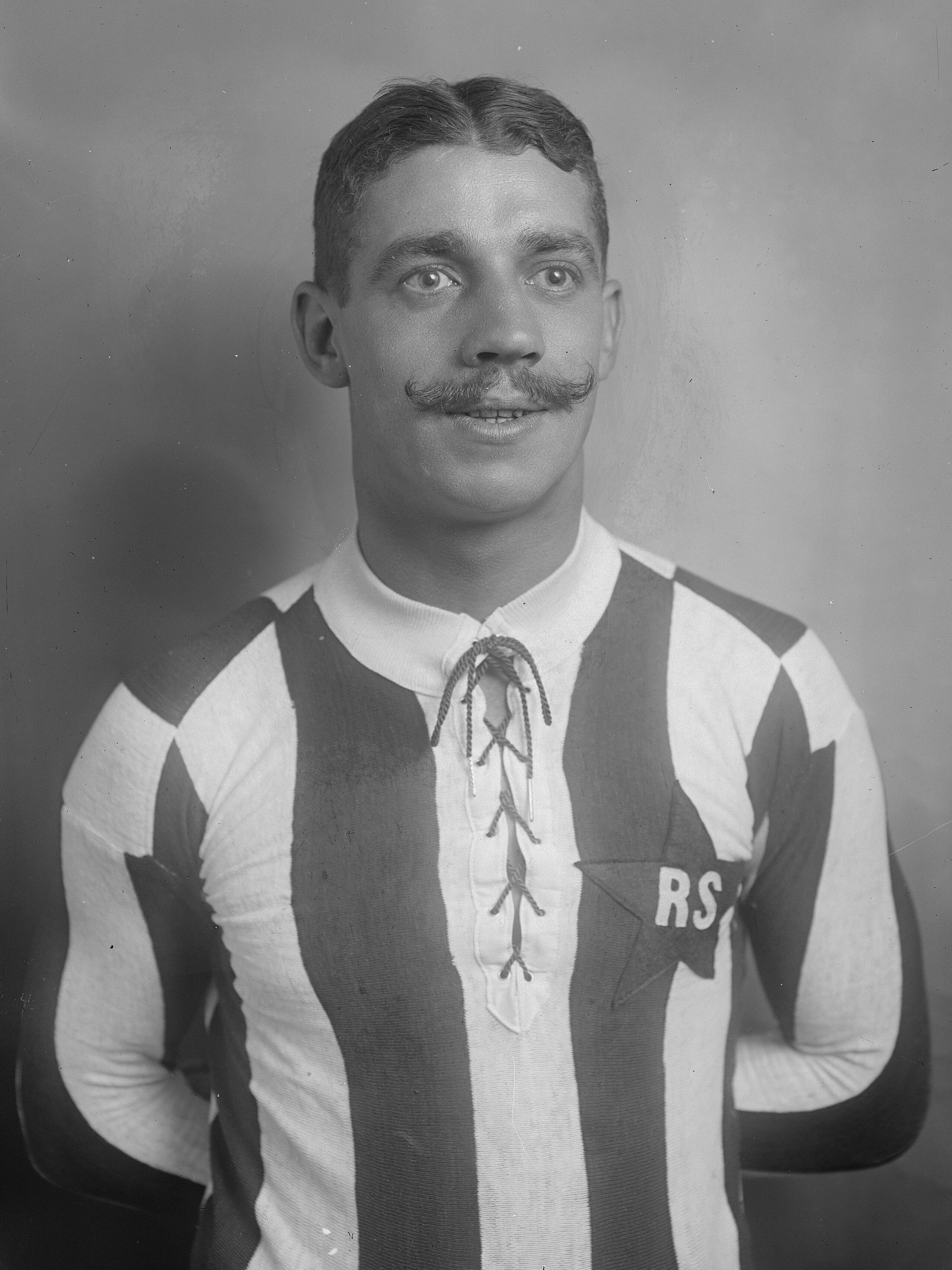
- Maës with Red Star in 1919

Personal information
- Date of birth: 15 September 1890
- Place of birth: Paris, France
- Date of death: 30 March 1945 (aged 54)
- Place of death: Mittelbau-Dora, Ellrich, Germany
- Height: 1.88 m (6 ft 2 in)
- Position: Forward

Senior career*
| Years | Team | Apps | (Gls) |
| 1907–1910 | Patronage Olier | 46 | (70) |
| 1910–1914 | Red Star | 61 | (94) |
| 1919–1930 | Caen | 168 | (258) |
| Total | | 275 | (422) |

International career
| 1911–1913 | France | 11 | (15) |
- * Club domestic league appearances and goals

Eugène Maës (15 September 1890 – 30 March 1945) was a French footballer who played as a forward for Patronage Olier, Red Star, and the France national team between 1905 and the outbreak of the First World War in 1914, scoring 15 international goals in just 11 caps. He is widely regarded as the first great French center-forward, being nicknamed Tête d'Or for his unrivaled heading game.

== Early life ==
Eugène Maës was born in Belle Époque Paris on 15 September 1890, and he began playing football in the Luxembourg Gardens in Paris with his friends in 1902, aged 12.

== Career ==
=== Patronage Olier ===
In 1905, the 15-year-old Maës joined the Patronage Olier, one of the many Catholic clubs affiliated with the FGSPF, where he already held the position of centre forward. He played a crucial role in helping Olier win the FGSPF Football Championship in 1908, beating Cadets de Bretagne 8–0 in the final held in Rennes on 26 April. This victory allowed the club to compete in the second edition of the Trophée de France in 1908, then the most prestigious Cup in France, where the 17-year-old Maës scored his side's third and final goal in a 3–0 win over the Parisian champion of the FCAF, SM de Puteaux, in the final on 3 May. Maës helped Olier win both titles again in 1910, beating Bons Gars Bordeaux 11–0 in the FGSPF final held in Bordeaux, and beating CA Vitry 2–0 in the Trophée de France final on 29 May, with Maës scoring the opening goal in the latter.

=== Red Star ===
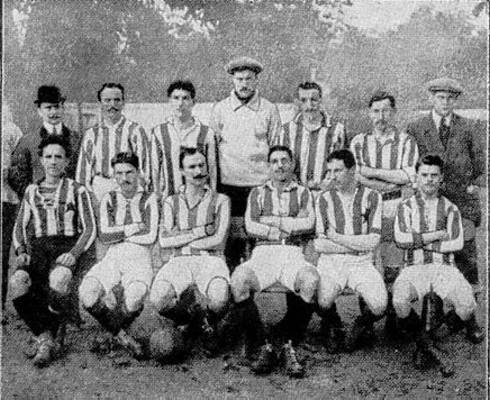
Maës (seated, fourth from the left) with Red Star in 1910.

Aided by his height of 1.80 meters tall, he was particularly renowned for his heading game and surprising leap, thanks to which he scored many goals, thus earning the nickname Tête d'Or (golden head). He was also particularly known for having made a specialty of scoring goals with the "goalkeeper charge", the action of jostling the goalkeeper to prevent him from having the ball, which was tolerated by the rules of the time. His goalscoring prowess eventually drew the attention of Jules Rimet's Red Star, a newly ambitious club that had recently founded the Ligue de Football Association (LFA) and which was about to open a new stadium in Saint-Ouen, so they signed him in 1910, aged only 19, to assure goals to the team.

Maës quickly became one of the most important players of the great Red Star team of the early 1910s, which included the likes of René Fenouillère, Pierre Chayriguès, and the captain Lucien Gamblin. They were runner-ups in the LFA Football Championship in 1911, but then won it in 1912. In the subsequent Trophée de France in 1912, he lost the final to Étoile des deux lacs, during which Maës scored his team's only goal in a 3–1 loss. This meant that he managed to score in each of the three finals of the Trophée de France that he had played. The club took advantage of their 1912 LFA victory to meet the greatest European teams of the time, including a narrow defeat (2–1) at home against the English professionals Tottenham in 1913. During the four seasons preceding the war, Maës scored goals in the Paris championship, the highest level of the time.

== International career ==
In December 1910, shortly after being transferred from the Patronage Olier to the wealthy Red Star, the French Interfederal Committee (CFI) offered the 20-year-old Maës his first selections for the French national team, making his debut in a friendly match against Hungary on 1 January 1911, and playing his second match against England in the inauguration of the Saint-Ouen stadium (currently known as Stade Bauer), both of which ending in 3–0 losses.

In his third cap on 9 April 1911, Maës scored his first goal for France, netting a brace in a 2–2 draw with Italy, each time through the "goalkeeper charge", even when the latter had blocked the ball. This was the start of a 7-game goalscoring streak for France: a goal against Switzerland in Geneva (another charge on the goalkeeper) and Belgium in Brussels (rebound), and then a goal in Saint-Ouen against both Belgium (with a header) and Switzerland on 18 February 1912. After this match, he was described by the daily newspaper L'Auto (the ancestor of L'Equipe) as "the best center-forward on the continent". With his 4th goal in Brussels, Maës became France's all-time top scorer, breaking the previous record of three goals held by André François.

In the next match against Italy in Turin on 17 March 1912, Maës obtained a very late military leave, so he only arrived on site on the day of the match, at 5 A.M., but a sleepless night had not disturbed him since he managed to score a hat-trick to help France achieve its first-ever victory over the Italians (4–3). He scored his goals with a long shot, a header, and then the winner in the 66th minute, in which he "snatched" the ball from the hands of the Italian goalkeeper, Vittorio Faroppa, who was accused of being responsible for the defeat by the Italian newspapers, which headlined "the Faroppa disaster". It took 82 years for France to defeat Italy in Italy again, doing so in 1994. He was a reserve team member at the 1912 Summer Olympics but did not appear on the field.

In the rematch against Italy in Saint-Ouen, France won again (1–0), and once again thanks to Maës, who scored the only goal of the match; his 7th straight match with a goal for France. In March against Switzerland, Maës, his former teammates Chayriguès and Alfred Gindrat, plus Maurice Bigué and Henri Bard, threatened to boycott the match if they did not get a bonus, so they were therefore temporarily sidelined and returned in April against a weak Luxembourg, against which he scored 5 goals in an 8–0 victory (including two headers), a French record that remains unbroken and that was only matched by Thadée Cisowski against Belgium in 1956. This was his last match for France; the midfielders Jean Ducret, Louis Mesnier, and Gaston Barreau were the ones who played the most with Maës.

A young prodigy of the Lost Generation, Maës was the first true goalscorer of the French national team. If not for his combat injury during the War, which obliged him to retire from professional football, Maës could certainly have been one of the best players in the history of the French national team. During his short international career of just two years, he scored 15 goals in just 11 caps, resulting in a ratio of 1.36 goals per game, which is the second-best ratio for a player with at least 5 matches for France, only behind Just Fontaine with 1.43; furthermore, neither Maës nor Fontaine took any penalty kicks. He remained the highest scorer in France's history for nearly 17 years, from April 1911 until it was broken by Paul Nicolas in February 1928.

== Later career ==
Like so many of his teammates, Maës was mobilized during the First World War, fighting in Belgium, where he was pierced by a bullet in the chest at the very beginning of the conflict, on 29 August 1914. Despite this, he kept eating and smoking as if nothing had happened, which led his coach Roland Richard to state "What will I have left with such a tough lad who never quits!". While convalescing in Caen, he met his future wife, Yvonne Bertheaux. He returned to the front with the rank of corporal in April 1915, distinguished himself during the Second Battle of Artois, and received the Croix de Guerre. However, 17 French internationals died during the War. During his leaves, he continued playing, and the sports press praised his military exploits.

On his return from the battlefields, Maës still played for Red Star in the 1918–19 season. Demobilized in August 1919, he settled in Caen, where he played at the Stade Malherbe from the resumption of competitions in 1919 and until 1930, when he retired at the age of 40. During his time there, he helped the club win seven Normandy Championships, including six in a row between 1920 and 1925, and a seventh in 1928. Through his experience, he quickly established himself as the team captain, which at the time had the duty of dictating the tactics to be followed and making up the line-ups since the figure of coach as we know it today did not yet exist.

In 1933, the retired Maës received the gold medal from the French Football Federation (FFF).

== Later life ==
While playing at Stade Malherbe, Maës, who was a good swimmer and practiced diving, took over the management of the Berteaux swimming school on the banks of the Orne in 1920, before replacing his father-in-law as its owner in 1924 and eventually renaming it le Lido. He modernized its infrastructure and created sporting events, such as the Traversée de Caen à la nage or the Régates de la Société nautique de Caen. In 1928, he also transformed the school into a dance hall very popular with the people of Caen. A lifeguard and then swimming instructor, Maës taught thousands of Caen residents about the pleasures of the water from 1919 to 1940.

During the Second World War, he was one of those rare sportsmen who resisted by continuing to train young Caen residents in swimming, rescue, and first aid.

== Death ==
His swimming school was opposite the Château de la Motte, which was the local headquarters of the Gestapo, run by Harald Heyns, so Maës often rubbed shoulders with Gestapo personalities on the banks of the Orne, including Heyns' mistress, Marie-Clotilde de Combiens, also known as the "Black Angel of the Gestapo" because she did not hesitate to denounce several people to the Nazis. No longer able to stand her attitude, Maës, who always had a "strong personality", declared his feelings to her, so she denounced him to the Gestapo for anti-German and Gaullist remarks, which led to his arrest in Caen on 21 June.

Deported to the Royallieu-Compiègne internment camp on 17 September, he was then transferred to the Mittelbau-Dora concentration camp in Ellrich, where he died on 30 March 1945, at the age of 54.

== Legacy ==
Throughout his life, Maës was distinguished on several occasions: he received the gold and silver medals of Physical Education, the silver medal of the Association of Swimming Teachers of France, and the gold medal of the National Federation of Rescue and First Aid.

A street in the city of Caen near the Stade de Venoix was named after him on 29 October 1954. Following restructuring work, the Caen nautical stadium was also named after him in May 2014.

== Career statistics ==
Scores and results list France's goal tally first, score column indicates score after each Maës goal.

List of international goals scored by Eugène Maës
| No. | Date | Venue | Opponent | Score | Result | Competition |
|---|---|---|---|---|---|---|
| 1 | 9 April 1911 | Stade Bauer, Saint-Ouen, France | Italy | 1–0 | 2–2 | Friendly |
| 2 | 9 April 1911 | Stade Bauer, Saint-Ouen, France | Italy | 2–1 | 2–2 | Friendly |
| 3 | 23 April 1911 | Parc des Sports, Geneva, Switzerland | Switzerland | 2–5 | 2–5 | Friendly |
| 4 | 30 April 1911 | Uccle Stadium, Brussels, Belgium | Belgium | 1–6 | 1–7 | Friendly |
| 5 | 28 January 1912 | Stade Bauer, Saint-Ouen, France | Belgium | 1–0 | 1–1 | Friendly |
| 6 | 18 February 1912 | Stade Bauer, Saint-Ouen, France | Switzerland | 3–0 | 4–1 | Friendly |
| 7 | 17 March 1912 | Campo Torino, Turin, Italy | Italy | 1–0 | 4–3 | Friendly |
| 8 | 17 March 1912 | Campo Torino, Turin, Italy | Italy | 2–1 | 4–3 | Friendly |
| 9 | 17 March 1912 | Campo Torino, Turin, Italy | Italy | 4–3 | 4–3 | Friendly |
| 10 | 12 January 1913 | Stade Bauer, Saint-Ouen, France | Italy | 1–0 | 1–0 | Friendly |
| 11 | 20 April 1913 | Stade Bauer, Saint-Ouen, France | Luxembourg | 1–0 | 8–0 | Friendly |
| 12 | 20 April 1913 | Stade Bauer, Saint-Ouen, France | Luxembourg | 3–0 | 8–0 | Friendly |
| 13 | 20 April 1913 | Stade Bauer, Saint-Ouen, France | Luxembourg | 4–0 | 8–0 | Friendly |
| 14 | 20 April 1913 | Stade Bauer, Saint-Ouen, France | Luxembourg | 7–0 | 8–0 | Friendly |
| 15 | 20 April 1913 | Stade Bauer, Saint-Ouen, France | Luxembourg | 8–0 | 8–0 | Friendly |

== Honours ==
Patronage Olier

- FGSPF Football Championship: 1908, 1910
- Trophée de France: 1908 and 1910

Red Star

- LFA Football Championship: 1912; runner-up 1911, 1913
- Trophée de France runner-up: 1912

Caen

- Normandy Championship (7): 1920, 1921, 1922, 1923, 1924, 1925, 1928
