= André Bellon =

French footballer

Personal information
- Full name: André Bellon
- Place of birth: Lyon, France
- Position: Defender

Senior career*
Years	Team	Apps	(Gls)
?–1916	CS Terreaux		
1916–1918	FC Lyon		
- * Club domestic league appearances and goals

André Bellon was a French footballer who played as a defender for FC Lyon in the mid-1910s. He is best known for playing in the first-ever Coupe de France final in 1918, which Lyon lost.

== Early life ==
André Bellon was born in France to Philippe André Auguste Bellon (1849–1918), a native of Molines-en-Queyras, and Elisabeth Anne Marie Berge. He had an older brother who was dead at birth in 1884, while André was born either in the late 1880s or early 1890s.

== Football career ==
Very little is known about his life; Bellon was playing football for the Lyon-based CS Terreaux (founded in 1911) in the 1915–16 Coupe des Alliés, playing a fundamental role in helping the team win five games on its way to the final, including a 4–2 win over Olympique de Marseille in the quarter-finals. Ahead of the final, the French newspaper L'Auto described Bellon as "the best center-half that we have ever seen in Lyon, with remarkable dribbling, knows how to take advantage of all the opponent's mistakes, and an impeccable and far-sighted game distributor". The final ended in a 1–7 loss to Stade Rennais, with L'Auto stating that Terreaux's best players were the David brothers and André Bellon. The following season, Bellon moved to another team from Lyon, FC Lyon, and also helped them reach the final of the Coupe des Alliés in 1916–17, and even though it ended in a 4–1 loss to CASG Paris, L'Auto highlighted the defensive performances of Bellon and Mortier.

The following season, in the second round replay of the 1917–18 Coupe de France against AS Lyonnaise on 18 November, Bellon scored an equalizer in terrible weather conditions to force another replay played a week later, which Lyon won 5–0. In the quarterfinals on 3 February 1918, he once again netted an equalizer in the second half of a 2–1 win over Stade Rennais on neutral ground in Paris. He thus helped his side reach the Coupe de France final, held on 5 May in Paris, which they lost 0–3 to Olympique Pantin.

Two weeks earlier, on 23 April, Bellon played a friendly match between the French and foreign residents of Lyon, which ended in a 2–4 win to the latter side.

== Honours ==
FC Lyon

- Coupe de France:
  - Runner-up: 1917–18
- Coupe des Alliés:
  - Runner-up: 1916–17
