= 1918 Coupe de France final =

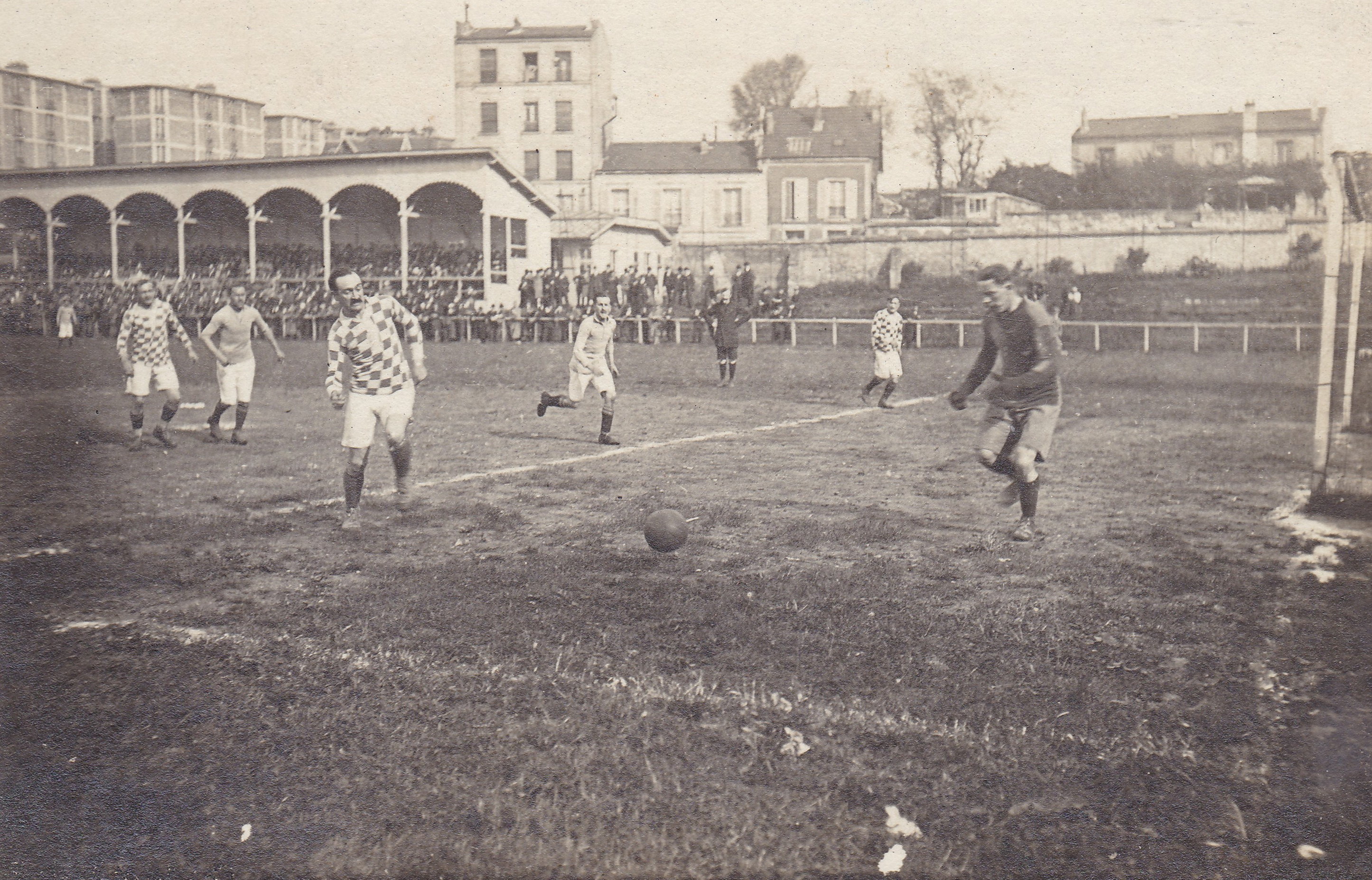
- Event: 1917–18 Coupe de France
| Olympique Pantin | FC Lyon |
| 3 | 0 |
- Date: 5 May 1918
- Venue: Parc des Princes, Paris
- Referee: Jacques Battaille
- Attendance: 2,000

The 1918 Coupe de France final was a football match held at Légion Saint-Michel field, Paris on May 5, 1918, that saw Olympique de Pantin defeat FC Lyon 3–0 thanks to goals by Émile Fiévet (2) and Louis Darques.

== Match details ==
5 May 1918

| Olympique Pantin | 3–0 | FC Lyon |
|---|---|---|
| Fiévet ?' ?'; Darques ?' |

Légion Saint-Michel field, Paris
Attendance: 2,000
Referee: Jacques Battaille

OLYMPIQUE DE PANTIN:
| GK | (Belgium) René Decoux |
| DF | (Belgium) Edouard Van Roey |
| DF | (Belgium) Lambrechts |
| DF | (Belgium) Henk Van Steck |
| DF | (France) Charles Olivan |
| MF | (France) Julien Lina |
| MF | (France) Jules Dewaquez |
| FW | (France) Paul Landauer |
| FW | (France) Louis Darques (c) |
| FW | (France) Émile Fiévet |
| FW | (France) Henri Delouys |
Manager:
? Assistant Referees: Fourth Official:

FC LYON:
| GK | (Luxembourg) Paul Weber |
| DF | (France) Louis Orvain |
| DF | (France) André Bellon |
| DF | (France) Louis Allemand |
| DF | (France) Roger Ebrard (c) |
| MF | (France) Maurice Meunier |
| MF | (France) Alexis Soulignac |
| FW | (France) Jacques Salmson |
| FW | (France) Henri Bard |
| FW | (France) André Weber |
| FW | G. Richer |
Manager:
?

== See also ==
- 1917–18 Coupe de France
