= Émile Fiévet =

French footballer (1886–1952)

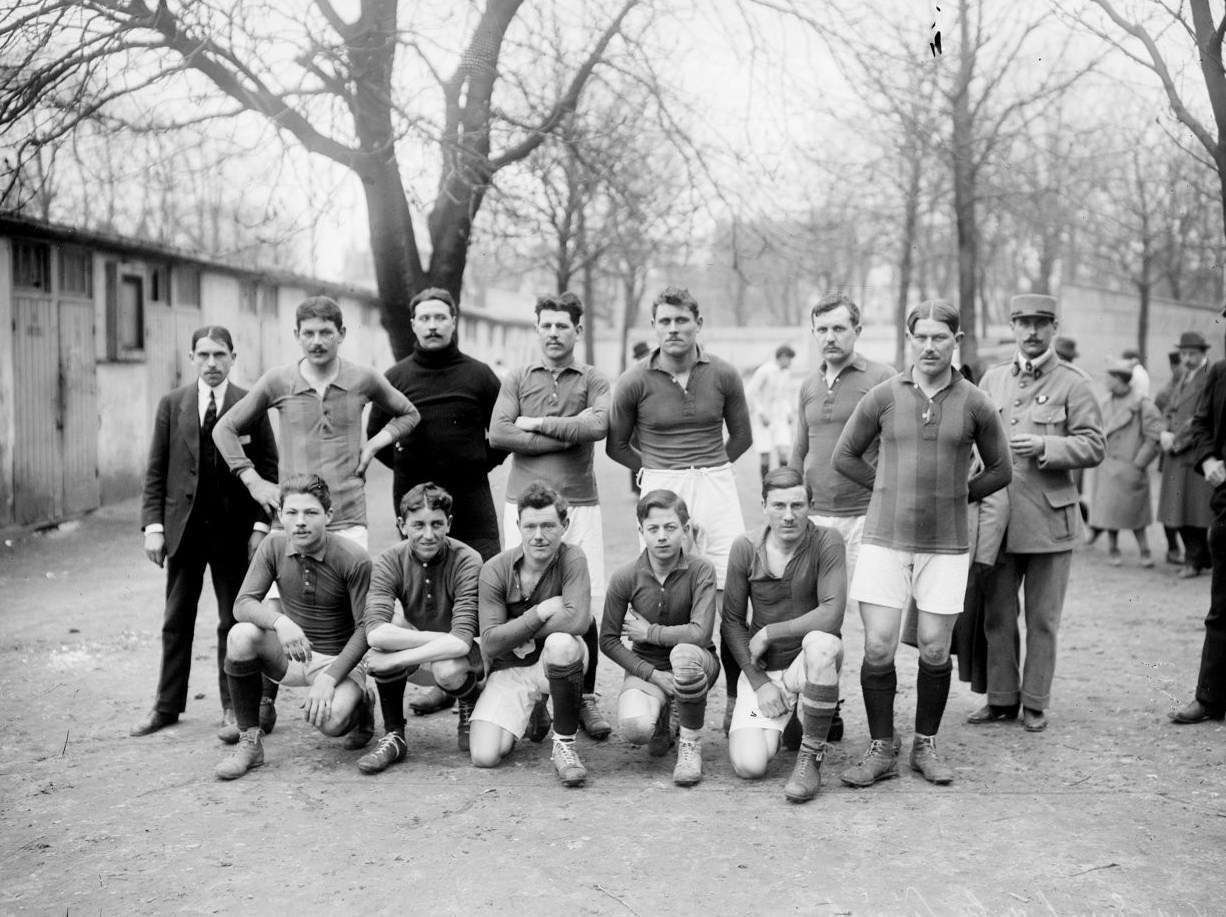
- Olympique before the 1919 Coupe de France final. Fiévet is the third player standing, arms crossed.

Personal information
- Full name: Émile Léon Victor Fiévet
- Date of birth: 25 May 1886
- Place of birth: Pantin, France
- Date of death: 23 November 1952 (aged 66)
- Place of death: Paris, France
- Position: Defender

Senior career*
Years	Team	Apps	(Gls)
1911–1919	Olympique de Pantin		

International career
1912	France	1	(0)
- * Club domestic league appearances and goals

Émile Léon Victor Fiévet (25 May 1886 – 23 November 1952) was a French footballer who played as a defender for Olympique de Pantin and the French national team in the 1910s. He is best known for scoring a brace in the first-ever Coupe de France final in 1918.

== Career ==
Born on 25 May 1886 in Pantin, Fiévet began his football career at his hometown club Olympique de Pantin in 1911, aged 25. The following year, on 7 March 1912, he earned his first (and only) international cap in a friendly match against Italy in Turin, helping France achieve its first-ever victory over the Italians (4–3). A few months later, he was selected by the French Interfederal Committee (CFI) for the football tournament at the 1912 Olympic Games in Stockholm, but at the last moment, France withdrew. The official reports wrongly refer to him as Paul Achille Fiévet, born on 21 April 1886.

Together with René Decoux, Henri Delouys, and Louis Darques, he was a member of the great Pantin team of the late 1910s, which won the 1916 Coupe de France after beating Étoile des Deux Lacs 3–0 in the final, and then reached the first-ever Coupe de France final in 1918, scoring twice to help his side to a 3–0 win over FC Lyon. In doing so, he became the author of the first goal and the first brace in the history of Coupe de France finals.

The following year, Fiévet helped his side reach another cup final, this time losing 3–2 to CASG Paris.

== Death ==
Fiévet died in Paris on 23 November 1952, at the age of 66.

== Honours ==
Olympique de Pantin

- Coupe de France:
  - Champions (1): 1916
- Coupe de France (Coupe Charles-Simon):
  - Champions (1): 1917–18
  - Runner-up (1): 1918–19

== Bibliography ==
- Perry, Raphaël (2021). Bleus éphémères [Ephemeral blues] (in French). Paris: Hugo Sport. p. 38. ISBN 978-2-7556-9244-0.
