= Coupe des Alliés =

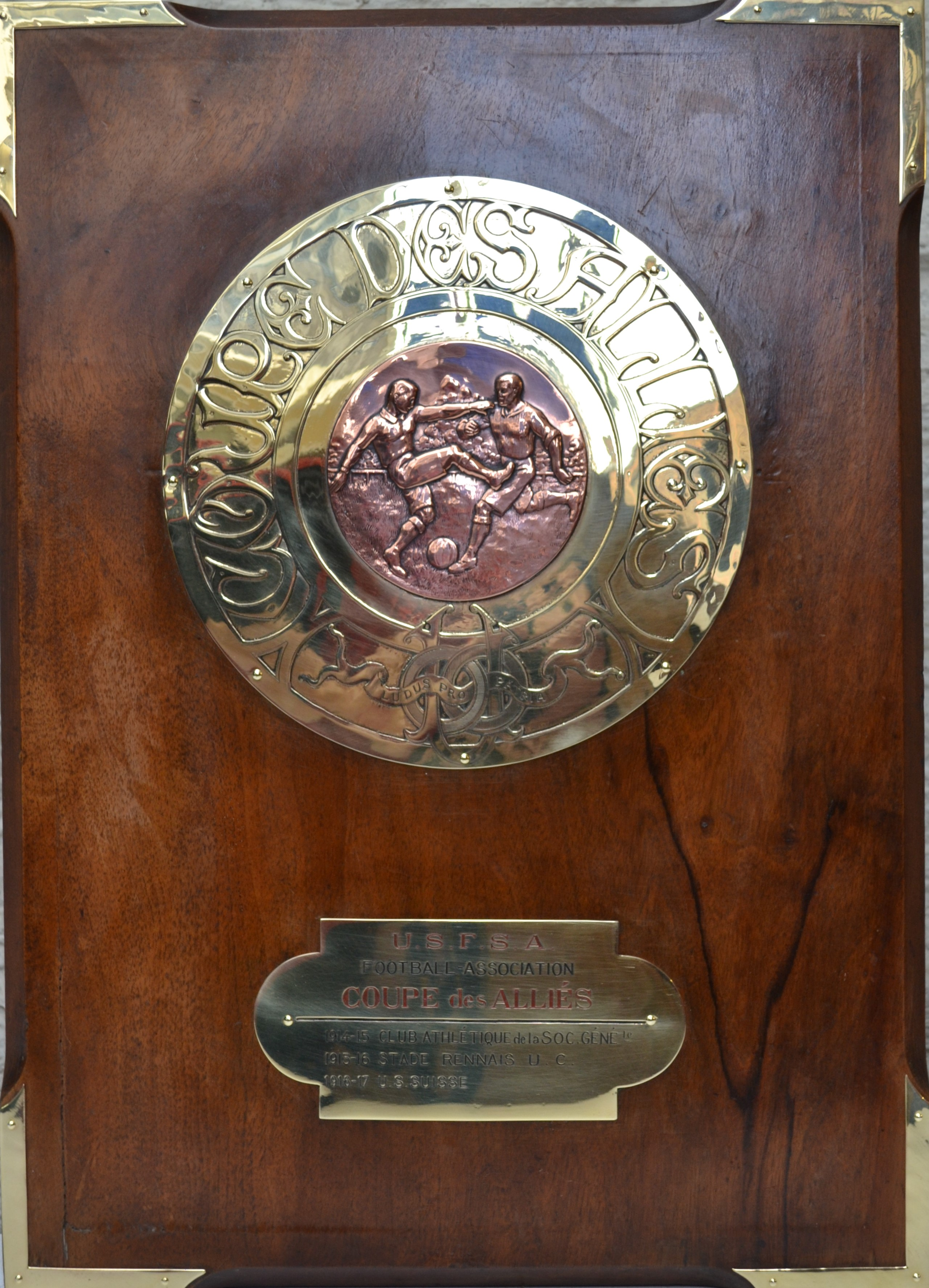
- The Coupe des Alliés Trophy
- Organiser(s): USFSA
- Founded: 1915
- Abolished: 1918; 108 years ago
- Region: France
- Teams: 8 to 16
- Last champions: CASG Paris (1917)
- Most championships: CASG Paris (2 titles)

The Coupe des Alliés (English: Allied Cup) was an knockout football competition contested by French clubs. It was contested annually during the First World War between 1915 and 1918, and it was organized by USFSA (the predecessor of the French Football Federation), which opened this competition for all teams from all federations.

The Coupe des Alliés was one of the so-called French "wartime" football competitions during WWI, together with the USFSA Coupe Nationale (1915–19), the FGSPF Coupe Nationale (1915–18), the Challenge de la Renommée (1915–19), and the FCAF's Challenge de la Victoire (1915–16).

== History ==
After having ceased in the fall of 1914 due to the outbreak of the First World War, sporting competitions and spectacles in France gradually resumed from 1915 onwards, first justified by the need to train the next generation of sports and military personnel and to celebrate the fraternity uniting the allies. Furthermore, in times of War, when so many French families are grieving the death or disappearance of a loved one at the Western Front, sports became their best source for escapism from the ongoing conflict, and the country's favorite sport was football. Therefore, from the first months of the conflict, the four federations administering football in France set up "wartime" competitions, with the USFSA creating a knockout cup which they called Coupe des Alliés to not only celebrate the fraternity uniting the allies, but to also give it an undeniable patriotic added value. This cup thus gave some activity back to football clubs whose championships had been interrupted by the War. Given the mobilization of Frenchmen to the war, these "wartime" competitions were mainly contested by players under the age of twenty.

== 1915 Coupe des Alliés ==
In the inaugural championship in 1915, the final was contested by CA Paris, which at the time had a formidable team that even had some international footballers, and by CASG Paris, who was competing in its first-ever final of any kind. The underdogs scored twice in the first-half thanks to a brace from Juste Brouzes, but in the second half, the referee Battaille awarded a penalty kick to CA Paris, which was converted by Henri Vialmonteil to cut the deficit down to 1–2. CASG then scored a third goal via Julien Devicq, but CA Paris responded with their second goal, and then pressed for the equalizer throughout the last 15 minutes, but CASG was able to resist their opponents' intense siege thanks to the efforts of their defensive trio: Jou, Lavenir and Leroy; and only failed to score a fourth because of CA Paris' goalkeeper Marcel Evrard. CASG Paris thus won the 1915 title with a score of 3–2. The French newspaper L'Auto described the final as "particularly interesting".

=== Results ===
8 March 1915
Final

CASG Paris	3 – 2	CA Paris
Brouzes (1–0); Devicq (3–1)	Report1; Report2	Viallemonteil (2–1) ? (3–2)

Referee: Mr. Battaille

== 1915–16 Coupe des Alliés ==
The second edition was won by Stade Rennais after beating CS Terreaux 7–1 in the final, with L'Auto stating that the best player on the field was the forward "Leclerc, without a shadow of a doubt", while Terreaux's best players were the David brothers and André Bellon.

1915–16 Coupe des Alliés
Stade Rennais
First title

== 1916–17 Coupe des Alliés ==
In 1917, two similar events took place, one organized by the USFSA, and the other by the LFA under the title of Interfederal Cup, with the latter having great success in terms of club participation. In the USFSA, the Brittany championship was contested by four clubs, with the defending champions Stade Rennais receiving CASG Saint-Malo on 5 November 1916, while US Rennaise received Stade Lavallois on 12 November, and the winners then met on 3 December. Olympique de Marseille defeated RC Marseille in the first round (6–1), then RCB Dijon (0–6) before withdrawing in the quarter-finals before facing NSC Nice. In the semifinals, NSC Nice faced FC Lyon in Marseille, in which the two teams found themselves in a stalemate because they were evenly matched, and it was only in the sixth period of extra-time that Lyon managed to break the deadlock with an "unstoppable shot" from André Weber.

In the final, FC Lyon faced CASG Paris, and both sides were flawed, since Lyon was missing Chadelaud, while CASG had neither Marion nor Vandendey due to injuries. As soon as the whistle was blown by M. Gemain, an official referee who belonged to the committee of Brittany, CASG quickly entered in action with several attacks, and despite the efforts of Lyon's goalkeeper Bétemps and its defenders, André Bellon and Mortier, CASG managed to score the opening goal with a "very pretty" strike from Paul Deydier. CASG then scored three goals via Lorilleux and Robyns to lead Lyon 4–0 at half-time, so they relaxed in the second half, and this allowed Weber to score a consolation goal for Lyon in a 4–1 loss. CASG Paris thus won its second title in three years (1915 and 1917).

=== Results ===
7 May 1917
Final

CASG Paris	4 – 1	FC Lyon
Deydier (1–0); Lorilleux (2–0); Robyns (3–0)	Report1	A. Weber (1–4)

Referee: M. Gemain (Brittany)

== Legacy ==
After the Coupe des Alliés and the 1916–17 LFA Interfederal Cup, the French Interfederal Committee (CFI) decided to bring the two rival Federations into agreement by taking charge of organizing an Interfederal event, the so-called 1917–18 Charles Simon Cup, created in memory of the recently deceased president of the CFI.

The 1916 Coupe des Alliés was the first trophy in the history of Stade Rennais, but it took over a century to reach the club's museum. The trophy was initially presumed lost until it was finally found in 1980 in Rouen, at a garage sale, by Guy Morat, a retired banker and an amateur antique dealer. In 2020, a few months after the club launched its museum, the Roazhon Park legends gallery, Morat gave the Coupe des Alliés to his nephew, who then presented it to the club's president Jacques Delanöe, who had recently launched an appeal to recover the club's first two Coupe de France (1965 and 1971), which was successful since the club was able to get its hands on both trophies again. Rennes' triumphant campaign at the 2018–19 Coupe de France meant that the club went from zero trophies in the display to now having four.

== See also ==
- Challenge International du Nord (1898–1914)
- Pyrenees Cup (1910–1914)
- 1916–17 LFA Interfederal Cup
