= 1919 Coupe de France final =

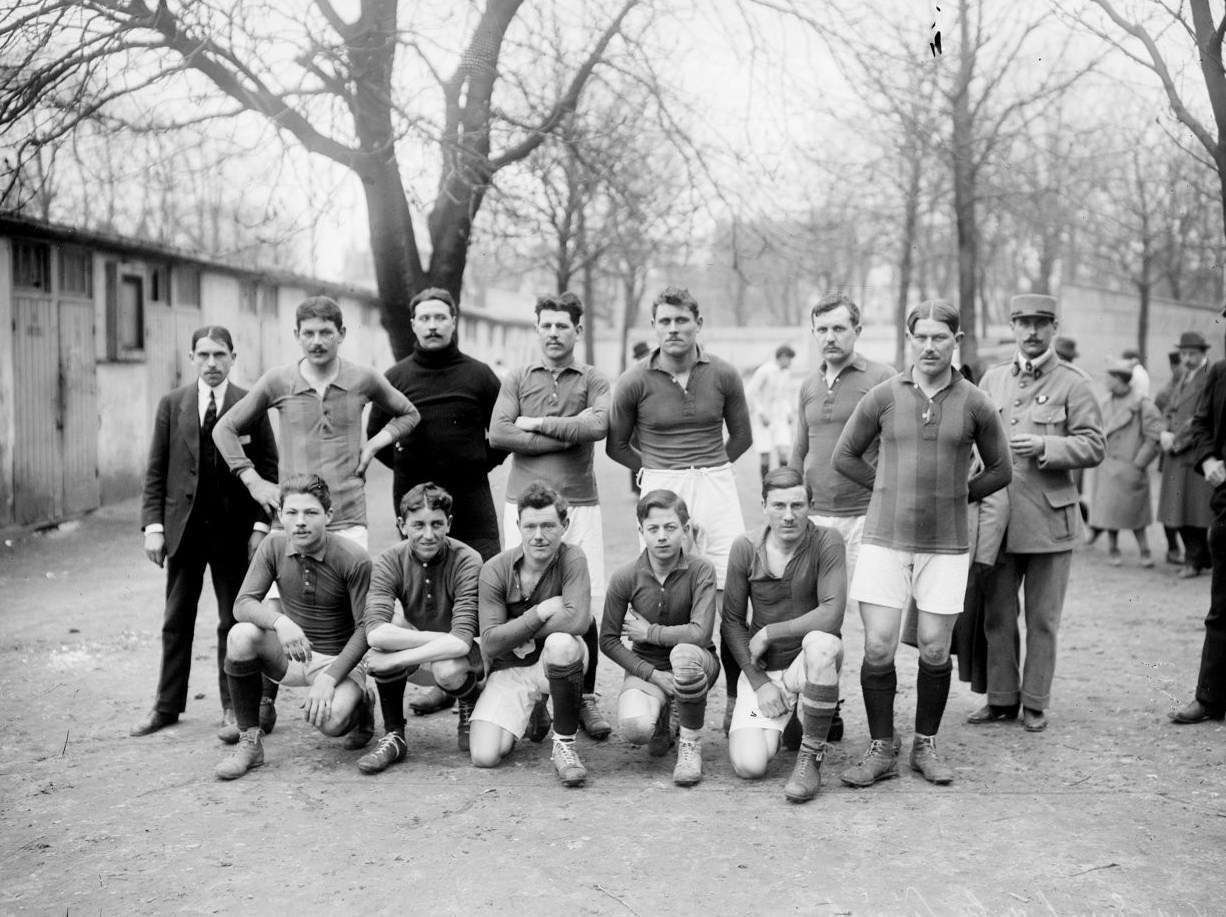
- Olympique de Paris team
- Event: 1918–19 Coupe de France
CASG Paris	Olympique de Paris
3	2
- After extra time
- Date: 6 April 1919
- Venue: Parc des Princes, Paris
- Referee: Armand Thibaudeau
- Attendance: 7,000

The 1919 Coupe de France final was a football match held at Parc des Princes, Paris on 6 April 1919, that saw CASG Paris defeat Olympique de Paris 3–2 thanks to goals by Émilien Devic and Louis Hatzfeld (2).

== Match details ==
6 April 1919

CASG Paris	3–2 (a.e.t.)	Olympique de Paris
Devic 20'; Hatzfeld 110' 118'		Darques 60'; Dewaquez 100'

Parc des Princes, Paris
Attendance: 10,000
Referee: Armand Thibaudeau

CASG PARIS:
GK	(France) Lucien Ganneval
DF	(England) John Mentha (c)
DF	(France) Célestin Frizon
DF	(England) Chris Hadden
DF	(France) Alphonse Schmer
MF	(France) Émilien Devic
MF	(France) Eugène Devicq
FW	(France) Paul Deydier
FW	(England) Louis Hatzfeld
FW	(France) Jean Boyer
FW	(France) Julien Devicq
Manager:
? Assistant Referees: Fourth Official:

OLYMPIQUE DE PARIS:
GK	(France) Joseph Blochet
DF	(France) Émile Fiévet
DF	(France) Henri Vasselin
DF	(France) Marcel Jousserand
DF	(France) Maurice Ninot
MF	(Belgium) Henk Van Steck
MF	(France) Jules Dewaquez
FW	(France) Paul Landauer
FW	(France) Marcel Mainguet
FW	(France) Louis Darques (c)
FW	(France) Eugène Dartoux
Manager:
?

== See also ==
- 1918–19 Coupe de France
