= Joseph Delvecchio =

French footballer (1885–1971

Personal information
- Birth name: Joseph Del Vecchio
- Date of birth: 23 June 1885
- Place of birth: Alfortville, France
- Date of death: 20 March 1971 (aged 85)
- Place of death: Conflans-Sainte-Honorine, France
- Height: 1.57 m (5 ft 2 in)
- Position: Left winger

Senior career*
Years	Team	Apps	(Gls)
1908–1914	AS Alfortvillaise		

International career
1910	France	1	(0)
- * Club domestic league appearances and goals

Joseph Del Vecchio (23 June 1885 – 20 March 1971) was a French footballer who played as a left winger for AS Alfortvillaise and the French national team in the early 1910s.

== Early life ==
Born on 23 June 1885 in Alfortville, as the son of an Italian immigrant mason, he was naturalized as Joseph Del Vecchio in 1894.

== Sporting career ==
Del Vecchio began his football career at his hometown club AS Alfortvillaise, a club affiliated to the FCAF, and which later merged with some other local clubs to form AS Amicale in 1912. On 17 May 1909, he started for Alfortville in the final of the 1909 FCAF Football Championship, scoring his side's second goal in an eventual 2–4 loss to Star Club de Caudry. Despite his small height of only 1.57 meters, he was described as "quick and crosses well, but too small, has no weight".

In late 1908, the French national team was taken over by Charles Simon's CFI, to which the FCAF belonged, so in January 1909, the FCAF demanded no less than five of its players in CFI's future French team. Eventually, Del Vecchio and his teammate Eugène Petel were called up by the French national team for a friendly match against Belgium at Gentilly on 3 April 1910, which ended in a 0–4 loss. Outside football, Delvecchio worked as a locksmith, and he was also an athlete in his spare time; for instance, in April 1910, he participated in a billiards competition held by AS Alfortvillaise, in which he faced a certain Petit in the 5th round and a certain Wagner in the 8th round.

Del Vecchio was also called up for the friendly against England amateurs at the Goldstone Ground, but he was unable to become available for the trip to Brighton due to his position as a locksmith, so he had to be replaced at the last-minute by Auguste Tousset, and was never called up again.

== Later life and death ==
During the outbreak of World War I in August 1914, Delvecchio was mobilized within the 76th Regiment infantry, where he rose in rank to become corporal before returning home to Alfortville. (Note: During the War, a certain Delvecchio played for Olympique Lyonnais in the 1915–16 Coupe des Alliés, but it was most likely a different person.)

Delvecchio died in Conflans-Sainte-Honorine on 20 March 1971, at the age of 85.

== Honours ==
AS Alfortvillaise

- FCAF Football Championship
  - Runner-up (1): 1909

== Bibliography ==
- Perry, Raphaël (2021). Bleus éphémères [Ephemeral blues] (in French). Paris: Hugo Sport. p. 33. ISBN 978-2-7556-9244-0.
