= Raymond Frémont =

French footballer (1890–1960)

Personal information
- Full name: Raymond Eugène Frémont
- Date of birth: 7 December 1890
- Place of birth: Croixdalle, France
- Date of death: 17 August 1960 (aged 69)
- Place of death: Le Havre, France
- Position: Goalkeeper

Senior career*
| Years | Team | Apps | (Gls) |
| 1914–1926 | Le Havre | | |

International career
| 1919 | France | 1 | (0) |
- * Club domestic league appearances and goals

Raymond Eugène Frémont (7 December 1890 – 17 August 1960) was a French footballer who played as a goalkeeper for Le Havre for over a decade, from 1914 until 1926. He also played one match for the French national team.

== Playing career ==
Born on 7 December 1890 in the Seine-Maritime town of Croixdalle, Frémont joined the ranks of Le Havre AC in 1914, aged 24. Two years later, he was a member of the Le Havre AC team that participated in the 1915–16 Coupe des Alliés, a knockout competition contested during the First World War, starting in the semifinals, which ended in a loss to the eventual champions Stade Rennais.

Frémont eventually established himself as the team's starting goalkeeper, playing a crucial role in helping Le Havre win the 1919 USFSA Football Championship, beating Olympique de Marseille 4–1 in the final in May 1919. The following year, Le Havre reached the 1920 Coupe de France final, but he did not play in the final, which they lost 2–1 to CA Paris. He stayed at Le Havre for over a decade, from 1914 until 1926, when he retired at the age of 36.

On 9 Mar 1919, the 28-year-old Frémont earned his first international cap for France in a friendly match against Belgium at Uccle on 9 March 1919, which was the country's first-ever match after the end of the First World War; he conceded two goals in a 2–2 draw.

== Death ==
Frémont died in Le Havre on 17 August 1960, at the age of 69.

== Honours ==
Le Havre AC

- USFSA Football Championship:
  - Champions (1): 1919
- Coupe de France:
  - Runner-up (1): 1920
