= Ligue de Football Association =

- Sport: Association football
- Jurisdiction: France
- Abbreviation: LFA
- Founded: 1910
- Headquarters: Paris
- President: Jules Rimet
- Replaced: FFF (Football)
- Closure date: 1920s; 0 days' time

The Ligue de Football Association (lit. 'Association Football League', LFA) was a French federation bringing together football clubs.

== History ==
The LFA was founded on 27 August 1910 by four dissident clubs of the USFSA: Cercle Athlétique de Paris, Red Star Amical Club, US Suisse Paris, and Paris Star. These clubs left the USFSA because the latter refused to join the French Interfederal Committee (CFI), which had represented France at FIFA for three years. The founding members were Georges Caizac, Mac Cabe, Vaury, Henri Beau, Robert Desmarets, Michel Fontaine, and the president of Red Star Jules Rimet. The latter took over the presidency of the newly created LFA, leaving his post at Red Star because he felt that he could "not be responsible for a club and represent all football clubs at the same time".

The LFA quickly joined the CFI, which made its players eligible for selection in the French national team (except the French Olympic team, which was still exclusively managed by the USFSA) and which allowed its clubs to participate in the Trophée de France. In 1913–14, the LFA controlled a three-level championship exclusively centered on Paris and its suburbs, with the first level having twelve clubs, the second 20, and the third 36.

In October 1917, the Ligue du Midi de Football Association (LFMA), bringing together clubs from the South-West and Languedoc, was refused recognition by the USFSA, so they affiliated with the LFA. Similarly, the Ligue de Lorraine de Football Association (LEFA) joined the LFA, which "nationalized" itself and organized its first national French Championship, won by the southerners of Vie au Grand Air du Médoc. In the following year, in 1918, the LFA also created a regional league for the clubs of Paris, the Ligue de Paris, whose first president was Dosogne, who was appointed unanimously, and it was vice-presided by Henri Gasqueton, the president of the LFMA. The name was later changed to Ligue Parisienne de Football Association (LPFA).

The LPFA played a decisive role in the constitution of the FFFA in 1919, taking on the role of the new Paris League from 7 July 1919 onwards. Under the influence and weight of Jules Rimet's LFA, the CFI gradually only dealt with football, thus directly paving the way, after the war, for the creation of the French Football Federation (FFF).

== LFA Football Championship ==
LFA French Football Championship
- Founded: 1910
- Abolished: 1919; 106 years ago
- Region: France
- Number of teams: 6 to 10
- Last champions: Red Star Amical Club (1919)
- Most successful club(s): CA Paris-Charenton (2 titles)

The LFA French Football Championship was an amateur football competition organized by the Ligue de Football Association (LFA). It was held every year from 1910 until the outbreak of the First World War in 1914, and since the LFA was a member of the CFI, the winner of the LFA Football Championship competed for the CFI's Trophée de France. During the War, the LFA organized and held two "wartime" competitions, the Challenge de la Renommée (1914–19), and the 1916–17 LFA Interfederal Cup. After the War, the LFA organized two more championships in 1918 and 1919, this time national.

=== 1910–11 LFA Championship ===
The inaugural LFA Championship was contested by six known participants, including the four founding clubs of the LFA: Red Star Amical Club, CA Paris-Charenton, US Suisse Paris, and Paris Star, plus CS athlétiques and FEC Levallois. The title was won by CA Paris after beating Red Star in the final on 12 March 1911, in Charentonneau, in front of a thousand spectators. Afterwards, the French newspaper La Presse stated that CA Paris was "one of the best amateur clubs in France".

12 March 1911
15:00
Final

CA Paris-Charenton	1 – 0	Red Star AC
Payot 1–0' Coulon - Verlet, C. Bilot - Bigué, Cyprès, G. Bilot - Bourdon, Devic, Mesnier, Gravier, Payot	Report1; Report2	Wooley - Heyting, Gindrat - Nicolaï, Rhéart, Gamblin - Verbrugge, Denis, Maës, Haazem, Morel

Stade de Charentonneau, Maisons-Alfort, France
Attendance: Approximately 1,000
Referee: Mr. Barette

=== 1911–12 LFA Championship ===
In 1912, Red Star, then led by their infamous captain Lucien Gamblin and their sports director/coach Roland Richard, was crowned LFA champion. The club took advantage of this victory to meet the greatest European teams of the time, including a narrow defeat (2–1) at home against the English professionals Tottenham in 1913.

=== 1912–13 LFA Championship ===
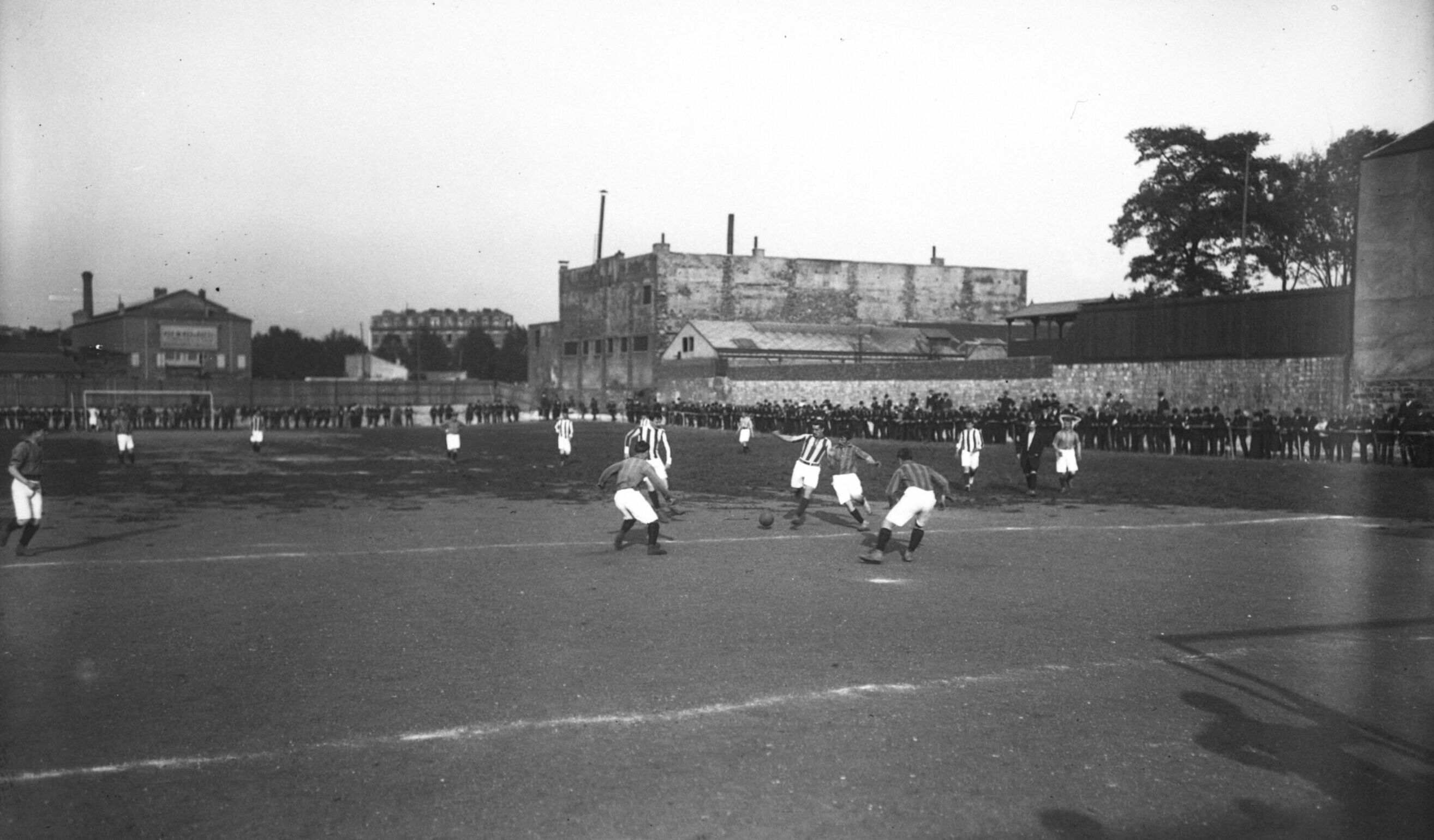
Red Star facing CA Vitry on 22 September 1912 at the Stade Bauer.

The 1912–13 LFA Championship was contested by 10 teams: Red Star AC, CA Paris, US Suisse, Olympique de Pantin, CA Vitry, CS athlétiques, JA Saint-Ouen, Etoile sportive du XIIIe, FEC Levallois, and Club de Levallois. In the last matchday of the championship, CA Paris sealed its second LFA title with a 4–1 win over Club de Levallois, thus finishing at 50 points, five more than runner-up Red Star.

=== 1913–14 LFA Championship ===
The 1913–14 LFA Championship was contested by 8 teams, which were the same as the previous edition minus Etoile sportive du XIIIe and Club de Levallois. The title was won by FEC Levallois with 24 points, four more than runner-up US Suisse.

=== 1914–19 Challenge de la Renommée ===
During the War, the LFA organized the Challenge de la Renommée, with a total of fourteen teams participating in its second edition in 1915–16. The first three editions of the competition between 1914–15 and 1916–17 were all won by Olympique de Pantin. The 1917–18 edition was won by Club Français, beating US Suisse in the final, and the last edition in 1918–19 was won by Red Star AC. The last edition was contested by sixteen teams divided into two groups.

=== 1916–17 Interfederal Cup ===
During the War, the LFA organized the 1916–17 Interfederal Cup, which was open to teams from other federations, and was won by AS Française.

=== 1917–18 LFA Championship ===
In mid-1917, the Ligue de Lorraine de Football Association (LEFA) joined the LFA, which "nationalized" itself and organized its first national French Championship, won by the southerners of Vie au Grand Air du Médoc, beating the Parisians of Club Français, who had eliminated the Lorraine champion.

=== 1918–19 LFA Championship ===
The 1918–19 LFA Championship was both its second national tournament and also its last overall. In the last matchday, Red Star AC sealed the title after a 4–4 draw with direct rivals CA Paris.

== Titles ==
Edition	Winners	Runner-up	Venue
1910–11	CA Paris-Charenton	Red Star AC	Stade de Charentonneau
1911–12	Red Star AC		
1912–13	CA Paris-Charenton (2)	Red Star AC	
1913–14	FEC Levallois	US Suisse Paris	
1917–18	VGA Médoc	Club Français	
1918–19	Red Star AC	CA Paris	

=== Winners of the Challenge de la Renommée ===
Edition	Winners
1914–15	Olympique de Pantin
1915–16	Olympique de Pantin (2)
1916–17	Olympique de Pantin (3)
1917–18	Club Français
1918–19	Red Star AC
