= Patronage Olier =

Football club in France

- Full name: Patronage Olier
- Founded: 1895
- Ground: Stade Châtenay-Malabry
- League: FGSPF Football Championship

The Patronage Olier is a football club founded in 1895, and located in Paris, France.

== History ==
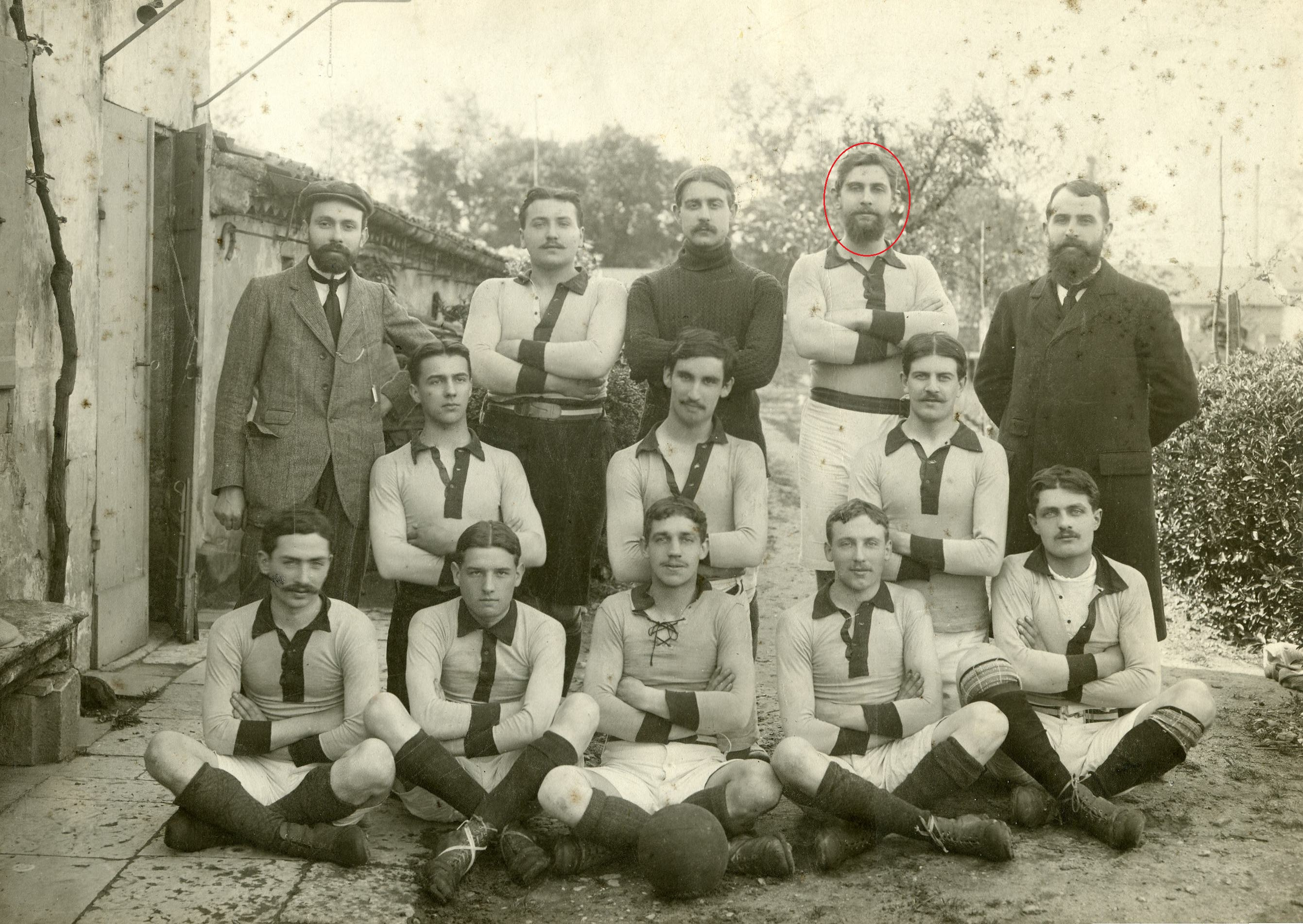
The Olier Patronage team around 1910.

In 1895, Abbot Gaston Simard de Pitray, a Sulpician, founded a football team that he placed under the patronage of Jean-Jacques Olier, priest of Saint-Sulpice, in 1641, hence its name as Patronage Olier. Being one of the many Catholic clubs affiliated with the Gymnastic and Sports Federation of French Patronages (FGSPF), Patronage Olier won the FGSPF Football Championship in 1908, beating Cadets de Bretagne 8–0 in the final held in Rennes on 26 April. This victory allowed the club to compete in the 1908 Trophée de France, in which they defeated the Bordeaux champion of FASO (Montrepos Athletic Society) in the semifinals by a score of 12–2. In the final on 3 May 1908, Patronage Olier defeated the Parisian champion of the FCAF, the SM de Puteaux, by a score of 3–0, with goals scored by Carlier, Bienvenu and Eugène Maës.

Patronage Olier won its second FGSPF championship in 1910, beating Bons Gars Bordeaux 11–0 in the final held in Bordeaux. The club then won the 1910 Trophée de France, beating CA Vitry 2–0 in the final on 29 May, courtesy of goals from Maës and Darlavoix (own goal). Patronage Olier won its third and final FGSPF championship in 1914, beating Bons Gars Bordeaux 3–1 in the final held in Paris. In the subsequent Trophée de France, the club was knocked out in the semifinals by VGA Médoc (2–3).

Patronage Olier was one of the 48 clubs that participated in the inaugural Coupe de France in 1917–18, making its debut on 4 November 1917, which ended in a 2–1 loss to Paris Star.

In 1941, Gaston de Pitray handed the keys of the PO to Maurice Perrenet, a Sulpician like him, who continued Gaston de Pitray's work until his retirement in 1974.

== Notable players ==
On 9 May 1909, Henri Guerre and Ernest Tossier became the first (and only) players in the club's history to play for the French national team, earning their first and final international cap for the Blues in a friendly match against Belgium at Brussels, which ended in a 2–5 loss.

Eugène Maës began his career at Patronage Olier, playing with them for five years between 1905 and 1910; he went on to score 14 goals for the French national team between 1911 and 1914, becoming the country's all-time top scorer at the time.

== Honours ==
- FGSPF Football Championship
  - Champions (2): 1908, 1910, and 1914
- Trophée de France
  - Champions (2): 1908 and 1910
