= USA Clichy =

Football club in France

- Full name: Union sportive et amicale de Clichy
- Short name: USA Clichy
- Founded: 1900
- Ground: Stade municipal Nelson Paillou
- League: USFSA Paris championship
Home colours

The Union sportive et amicale de Clichy, abbreviated to USA Clichy, is a French Association football club founded in 1900, and located in Clichy, in Hauts-de-Seine.

== History ==
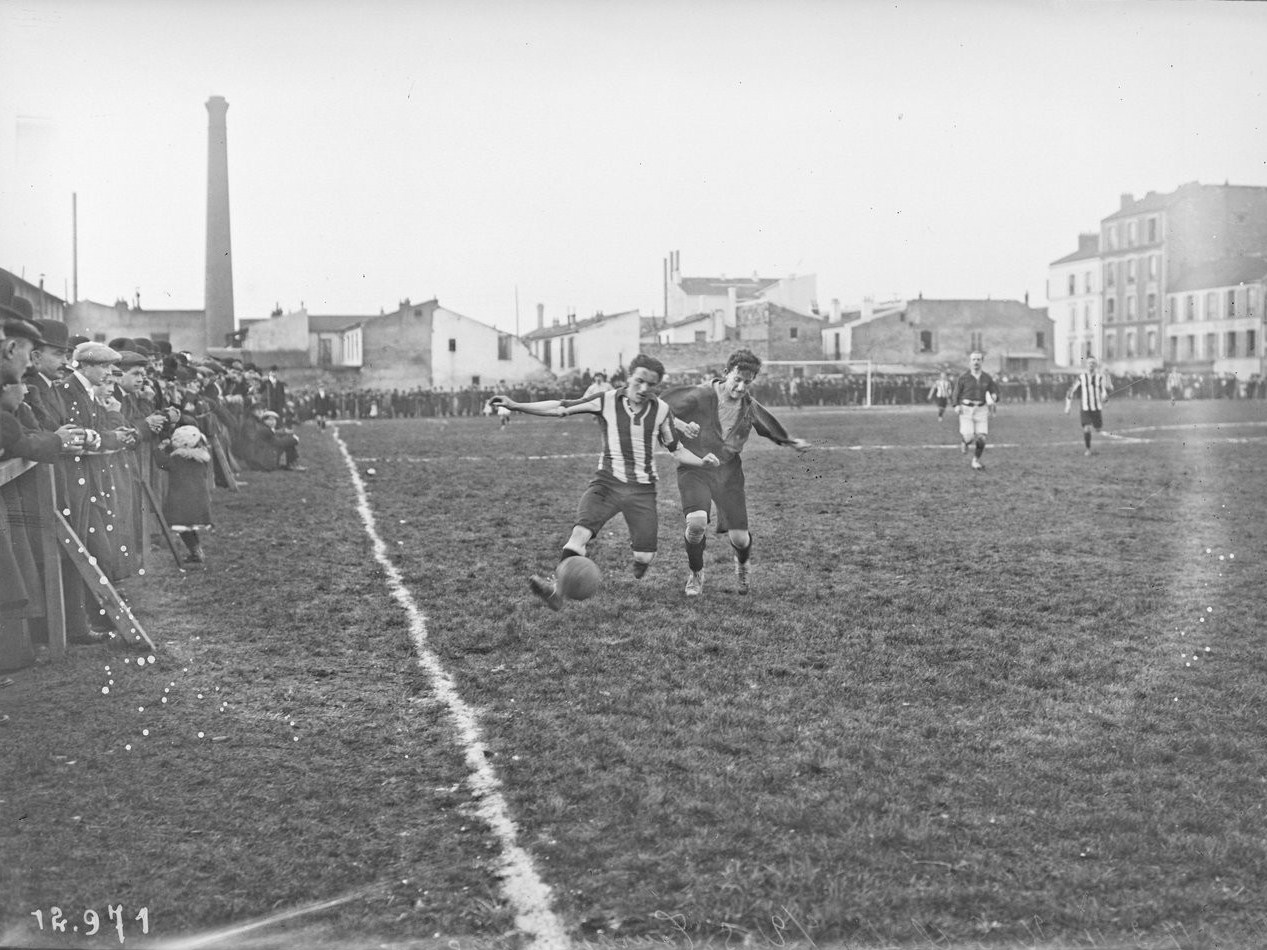
US Clichy during a 3–0 victory in a friendly match against US Tourquennoise in Levallois on 19 March 1911.

The Union sportive de Clichy was founded in 1900, and following its creation, the club registered with the USFSA; it adopted the red and black colors, in homage to the Paris Commune.

From 1909 to 1914, the club competed in the first series of the USFSA Paris championship, and during this period, Clichy never Clichy because of the dominated of the likes of Racing Club de France, CASG Paris, and AS Française. However, US Clichy finished runner-up in Paris in the 1910–11 season, being the only club not to lose to the champion, RC France. The club also played in the Coupe Dewar, a Parisian competition in which it reached the finals in 1911, and in 1914, losing the former in extra-time (0–1) to Club athlétique de Paris 14, and the latter 5–1 to the same club.

Before the start of the 1913–14 season, USA Clichy merged with another club from Clichy, the Sporting Club amical, and took the name of Union sportive et amicale de Clichy. USA Clichy was one of the 48 clubs that participated in the inaugural Coupe de France in 1917–18, being knocked out in the round of 16 by AS Française (13–0). Two years later, the club reached the quarter-finals of the competition after beating Étoile des Deux Lacs, ASPO Châteauroux and FC Rouennais, but then lost to Le Havre AC in Rouen by the score of 3–2.

USA Clichy was one of the first clubs registered with the French Football Federation in 1919, and its affiliation number is therefore n°5. In 2015–16, the club played in the Promotion d’Honneur de Paris.

== Honours ==
USA Clichy

- Coupe Dewar:
  - Runner-up (1): 1911 and 1914
