= Lucien Leclercq =

French footballer and referee (1897–1971)

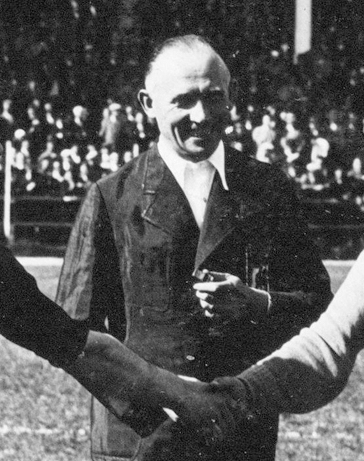
- Leclerc at the 1938 FIFA World Cup

Personal information
- Full name: Lucien Jean Leclercq
- Date of birth: 16 January 1897
- Place of birth: Tourcoing, France
- Date of death: 14 June 1971 (aged 74)
- Place of death: Lille, France
- Position: Forward
- Stade Rennais
Refereeing career
Years		Role
International
Years	League	Role
1934–1938	FIFA listed	Referee

Lucien Jean Leclercq (16 January 1887 – 14 June 1971) was a French footballer who played for Stade Rennais in the mid-1910s, and later a referee who oversaw 13 international matches between 1934 and 1938, including two in the 1938 FIFA World Cup in France.

== Playing career ==
Born in Tourcoing on 16 January 1897, Leclercq was a member of the Stade Rennais team that participated in the Coupe des Alliés in 1915–16, a knockout competition contested during the First World War, which given the mobilization of Frenchmen to the war, was mainly contested by U20 players, such as the 19-year-old Leclercq, who started in both the semifinals, a 3–0 victory over Le Havre, and in the final, helping his side to a 7–1 trashing of CS Terreaux, with the journalists of the French newspaper L'Auto (currently known as L'Équipe) stating that that the best player on the field was the forward "Leclercq, without a shadow of a doubt".

== Refereeing career ==
After retiring, Leclercq became a referee, making his international debut on 4 November 1934, aged 37, in a friendly between Switzerland and the Netherlands, which ended in a 4–2 win for the Dutch. The following year, on 5 May 1935, he officiated the 1935 Coupe de France final in Colombes, which saw Olympique de Marseille claim the title with a 3–0 victory over his former club Stade Rennais. During the final, Rennes scored from a free-kick, which he disallowed due to an offside from André Chauvel. Two years later, he refereed another club final, but this time in a international tournament held in Paris, which saw Bologna defeat Chelsea 4–1.

In total, Leclercq oversaw 13 international matches between 1934 and 1938, including one in the 1938 FIFA World Cup qualification, and two in the tournament itself. He officiated a first round clash between Czechoslovakia and the Netherlands, with the Czechs winning 3–0 after extra-time, and the semifinal between Hungary and Sweden at the Parc de Princes in Paris, which ended in a 5–1 victory for the Magyar, who went on to lose the final.

Throughout his career, Leclercq oversaw a total of 12 Olympique de Marseille matches, which ended in 5 wins, 4 draws, and 3 losses for OM.

== Death ==
Leclercq died in Lille on 14 June 1971, at the age of 74.

== Honours ==
Stade Rennais

- Coupe des Alliés:
  - Champions: 1915–16
