= Vittorio Faroppa =

Italian footballer

Personal information
- Full name: Vittorio Faroppa
- Date of birth: 29 August 1887
- Place of birth: Turin, Italy
- Date of death: 11 November 1958 (aged 71)
- Place of death: Turin, Italy
- Position: Goalkeeper

Senior career*
Years	Team	Apps	(Gls)
190?	Virtus Torino	?	(0)
1908–1914	Piemonte	15	(0)
1914–1915	Juventus	6	(0)

International career
1912	Italy	1	(0)

Managerial career
- 1933–1934: Grosseto
- 1934–1935: Genoa
- 1936–1939: Siena
- 1939–1940: Alessandria
- 1946–1947: Udinese
- 1948–1949: Valle d'Aosta
- * Club domestic league appearances and goals

Vittorio Faroppa (Italian pronunciation: [vitˈtɔːrjo faˈrɔppa]; 29 August 1887 – 11 November 1958) was an Italian footballer who played as a goalkeeper. On 17 March 1912, he represented the Italy national football team on the occasion of a friendly match against France in a 4–3 home loss.
