= CS Terreaux =

Football club in France

- Full name: Club sportif des Terreaux
- Short name: CS Terreaux
- Founded: 1911
- Dissolved: 1929
- Ground: Lyon
- League: USFSA Football Championship

The Club sportif des Terreaux, abbreviated to CS Terreaux was a football team based in Lyon, which participated in the USFSA Football Championship before joining the Rhône Sportif multi-sports club in 1929.

== History ==
Club sportif des Terreaux was founded in 1911 by a group of young people who love sports, most of whom were currently mobilized. It was named after the district of Lyon in which the club was formed. CS Terreaux quickly established itself in the region's sporting circles, and in 1912, the club won a third-series football championship for teams with one or two years of existence, mainly thanks to the camaraderie that united all of its members. In the following year, in 1913, the club won the second-series after defeating AFC de Saint-Étienne in a promotion match, thus becoming one of the six first-series teams of the Lyon committee. In the following year, in 1914, the club won the Lyon championship after beating FC Lyon, Olympique Lyonnais, and AS Lyonnaise.

As such, they were set to compete at the 1915 USFSA Football Championship, but the club's meteoric rise was interrupted by the outbreak of the First World War in July 1914, which halted both the USFSA and the Lyon championships. In order to give some activity back to these football clubs, the USFSA created the Coupe des Alliés (1915–18), and CS Terreaux reached the final of the 1915–16 edition, after defeating the likes of AS Lyonnaise (3–1), FC Lyon (4–2), Olympique de Marseille (4–2), and International FC Nice (2–1). In the final, which was held at on 4 June 1916, CS Terreaux lost to Stade Rennais by a score of 1–7. The French newspaper L'Auto stated Terreaux's best players were the David brothers and André Bellon.

CS Terreaux played in the inaugural Coupe de France in 1917–18, making its debut in November 1917, against Olympique de Marseille, which played the first 10 minutes of the match with only nine men. Terreaux had already faced OM twice, winning on both occasions: 4–2 at the 1915–16 Coupe des Alliés, and then 5–2 at the 1916–17 LFA Interfederal Cup; but this time, it was OM that came out on top with a 2–0 victory.

CS Terreaux's best performance at the Coupe de France came in the following season, in 1918–19, beating US Saint-Bruno (Lyon) by a score of 5–0 in the first round on 6 October 1918; then FC de Lyon (2–1) in the round of 32; and then Alliance Vélo Sportive (7–1) in the round of 16 held in Auxerre; before losing to VGA Médoc (3–1) in the quarter-finals held in Paris.

In the 1919 USFSA Football Championship, the last of its kind, CS Terreaux reached the semifinals, where they once again faced Olympique de Marseille, and once again lost, this time by a score of 6–1.

== Decline and collapse ==
In 1929, CS Terreaux merged with the multi-sports club Rhône Sportif Terreaux (1919), led by the emblematic Abbot Antoine Firmin, who directed the Parochial patronage of Terreaux, which was affiliated with the Gymnastic and Sports Federation of French Patronages (FGSPF), and Abbé Firmin distinguished himself in particular by its fierce opposition to Professionalism in association football.

== Honours ==
- Coupe des Alliés
  - Runner-up (1): 1915–16
