= Maurice Bigué =

French footballer (1886-1972)

Personal information
- Date of birth: 3 July 1886
- Date of death: 25 April 1972 (aged 85)

International career
Years	Team	Apps	(Gls)
1911–1914	France	6	(0)

Maurice Bigué (3 July 1886 – 25 April 1972) was a French footballer. He played in six matches for the France national football team from 1911 to 1914. He was also named in France's squad for the football tournament at the 1912 Summer Olympics, but the French side withdrew from the competition.
