= Émilien Devic =

French footballer (1888–1944)

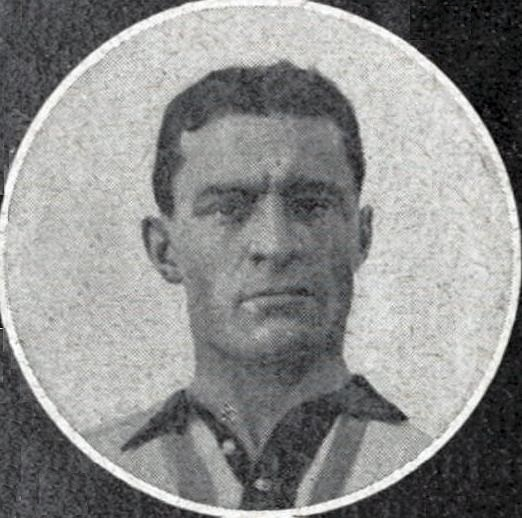

Personal information
- Date of birth: 16 November 1888
- Place of birth: Romainville, France
- Date of death: 21 August 1944 (aged 55)
- Position: Midfielder

International career
Years	Team	Apps	(Gls)
1911–1921	France	9	(2)

Émilien Devic (16 November 1888 – 21 August 1944) was a French footballer. He played in nine matches for the France national football team from 1911 to 1921. He was also named in France's squad for the football tournament at the 1912 Summer Olympics, but the French side withdrew from the competition. Devic was a French Resistance member during the Second World War and was shot by German forces in 1944.
