= Charles Robert Ruesch =

Swiss footballer

Personal information
- Place of birth: Switzerland
- Position: Defender

Senior career*
Years	Team	Apps	(Gls)
1904–1905	Athletic Club		
1915–1916	Stade Rennais		
- * Club domestic league appearances and goals

Charles Robert Ruesch was a Swiss footballer who played as a defender for Athletic Club.

== Biography ==
Born in Switzerland, Ruesch moved to Madrid for unknown reasons, and in 1903, he represented Athletic Madrid (currently known as Atlético Madrid) in a foot race through the streets of Madrid organized by Manuel Rodríguez Arzuaga, who donated a trophy valued at 500 pesetas to the winner, the so-called Copa Rodríguez Arzuaga; Ruesch won the race, being closely followed by four teammates, all of them members of the Athletic Madrid, which was thus proclaimed champion of the tournament. Copa Rodríguez Arzuaga quickly became the main athletics tournament in Madrid, with Ruesch and Athletic participating again in the 1904 edition, which was won Sociedad Gimnástica. On 22 April 1905, Athletic's Ruesch won the third edition of the Copa Rodríguez Arzuaga with a time of 40.09 seconds, narrowly ahead of Gimnástica's José Nougués (40.10) and Athletic's Jerónimo López (41.01), doing so in front of a thousand spectators.

In 1905, Athletic Madrid loaned some of its players to Athletic Bilbao to reinforce the Basque team in the 1905 Copa del Rey, such as Ruesch, Javier Prado, Tomás Murga, and Miguel de Valdeterrazo. Madrid to join Athletic Bilbao, where he played for the club's football section, starting in the 1905 Copa del Rey final, which ended in a 0–1 loss to Madrid FC.

At some point after 1905, Ruesch moved to Rennes, France, where he became the first foreign player in the history of Stade Rennais in 1916.

== Honours ==
Athletic Club

- Copa del Rey:
  - Runner-up (1): 1905
