= CA Vitry =

Football club in France

- Full name: Club athlétique de Vitry
- Short name: CA Vitry
- Founded: 1897
- Ground: Stade Roger Couderc
- League: FCAF Football Championship
Home colours	Away colours

The Club athlétique de Vitry, abbreviated to CA Vitry, is a football team founded in 1897, and located in Vitry-sur-Seine in the southern suburbs of Paris, France.

== History ==
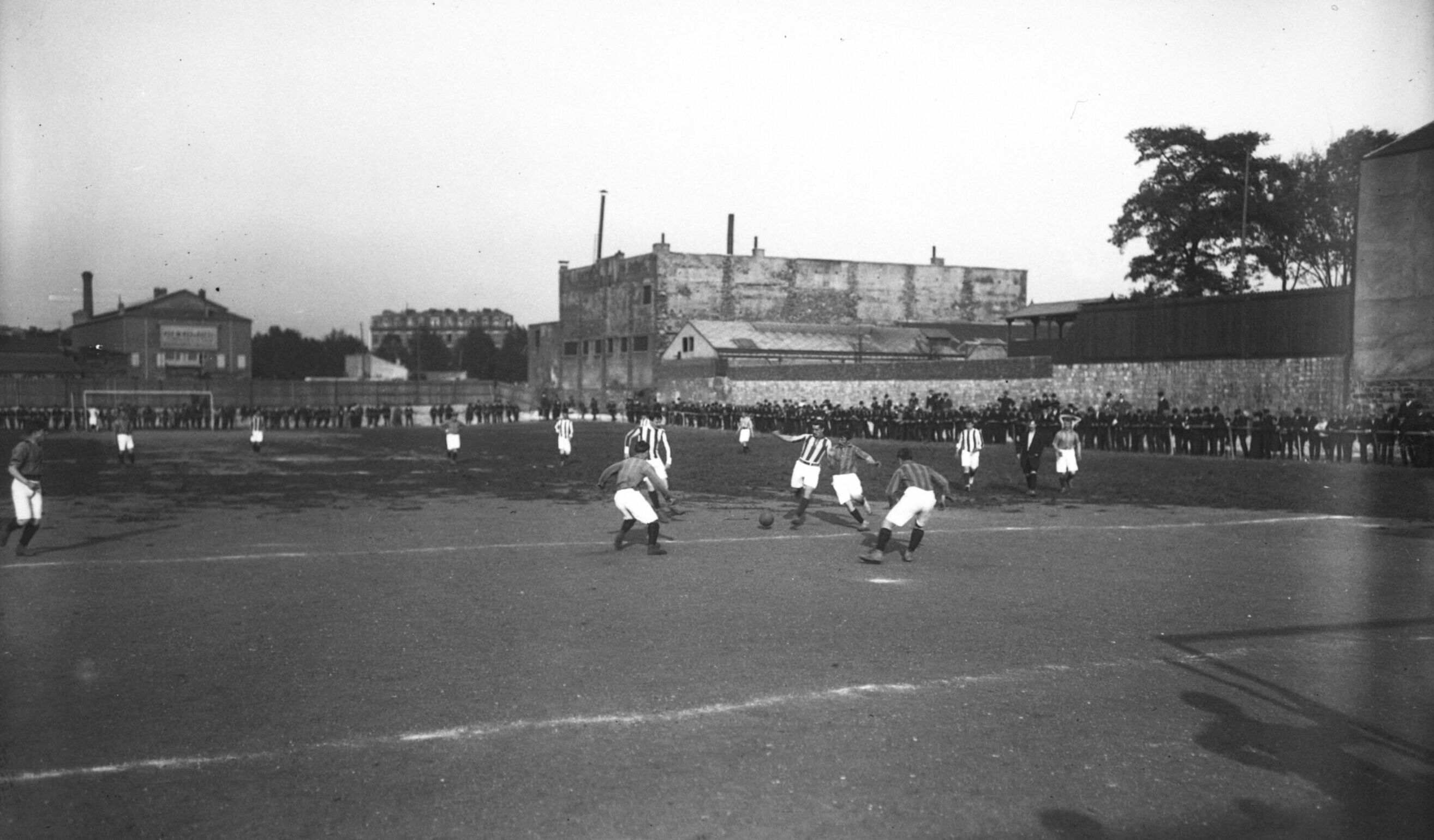
Red Star AC facing CA Vitry on 22 September 1912 at the Stade Bauer.

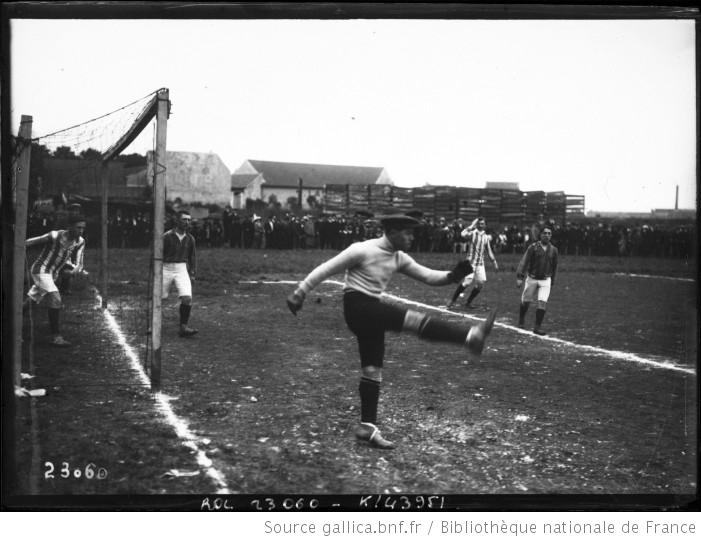
Photo of the CA Vitry team against RC Luxembourg in 1912.

Club athlétique de Vitry was founded in 1897. Affiliated with the French Amateur Cycling Federation (FCAF), CA Vitry won the FCAF Championship twice in 1910 and 1911. These victories allowed the club to compete in the Trophée de France, reaching the 1910 final, which they lost 2–0 to Patronage Olier. The team that lined up in the final was: Chasselin - CH. Darlavoix, Sollier - Georges, Vascout, Spaiser - Moreau, Jourde, Boutefoy, Bergeron, Bourgenno.

In the Coupe de France, CAV's best performance dates back to the 1925–26 season, in which the club played a semi-final at the Stade Pershing in front of 20,000 spectators on 28 March 1926. Vitry was eliminated by the champion of the Franche-Comté-Bourgogne League, the AS Valentigney by a score of 2–1.

In the 1920s, CA Vitry played a few seasons among the Parisian elite by competing in the Paris championship of the Parisian League, and Vitry remained among the Parisian elite until 1927, when they were relegated to Promotion, level 2 behind Honor. CA Vitry played in the Division of Honor almost every year between 1949 and 1966, before leaving the regional elite following a relegation.

In 2022, the club was promoted to Championnat National 3, but two years later, in 2024, the club was relegated back to Régional 1.

The colors of CA Vitry are yellow and green. In 1917, during the LFA's Challenge de la Renommée, the club played with a green and gold striped jersey.

== Infrastructure ==
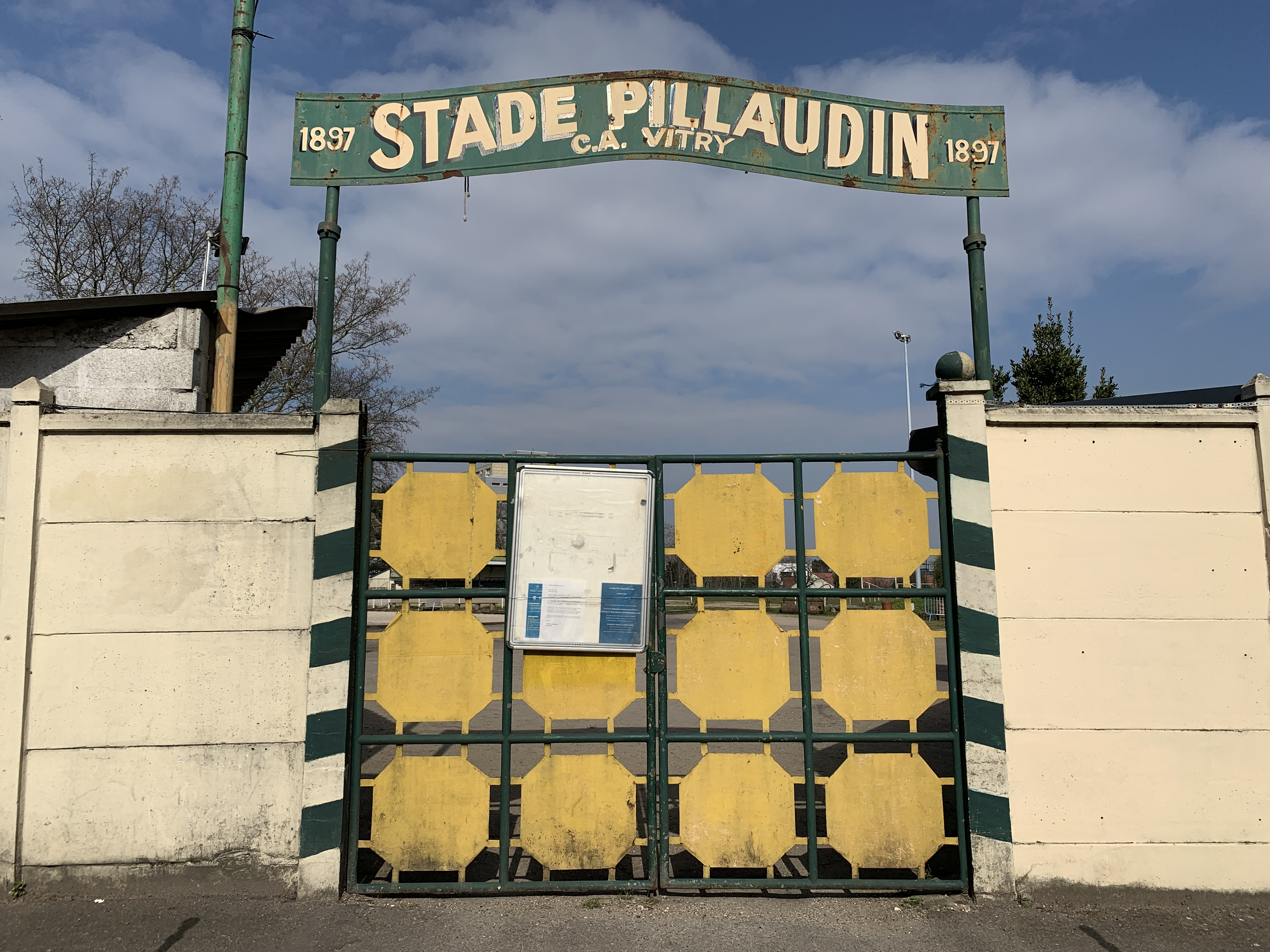
Entrance to the Pillaudin stadium in Vitry-sur-Seine.

=== Head office ===
The club's headquarters are located at the old Pillaudin stadium, located on Avenue de la République in the north of the town of Vitry-sur-Seine.

=== Stadiums ===
CA Vitry played for a long time at the Pillaudin stadium, which is now obsolete. Nowadays, the club trains at the Gabriel-Péri stadium, the city's main stadium, as well as at the interdepartmental sports park in Choisy-le-Roi, in Val-de-Marne. It plays its home matches at the Roger Couderc stadium, located at 97 rue Auber in Vitry.

== Honours ==
- FCAF Championship
  - Champions (2): 1910 and 1911
- Trophée de France
  - Runner-up (2): 1910
