= 1917–18 Coupe de France =

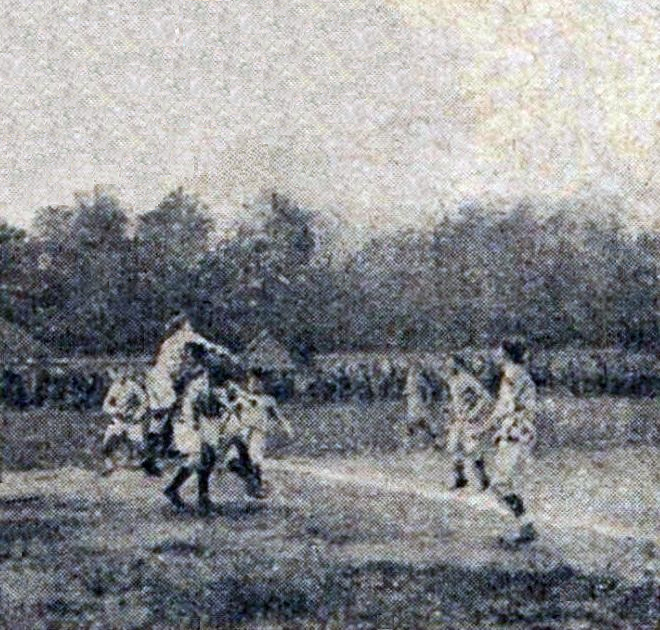
- The finale

Tournament details
- Country: France
- Teams: 48

Final positions
- Champions: Olympique Pantin (1st title)
- Runners-up: FC Lyon

The 1917–18 Coupe de France (officially Coupe Charles–Simon 1917–18) was the first season of the most prestigious cup competition in France. The competition was open to all clubs who were affiliated with an organisation that was a member of the Comité français interfédéral (CFI). The cup was named after Charles Simon, the Secretary-General of the CFI at the outbreak of World War I, who died in battle in 1915.

Forty-eight clubs competed in the cup and Olympique Pantin defeated FC Lyon 3–0 in the final.

== First round ==
Teams from the north and east of France were unable to compete due to World War I. Thirty-two teams competed in this round with sixteen others being given byes to the next round. The matches were played on a regional basis on 7 October 1917.

| Team 1 | Score | Team 2 |
|---|---|---|
| Alliance Vélo Sportive | 6–1 | AJ Auxerroise |
| USA Clichy | 4–1 | Avenir Gentilly |
| UA Cognac | 1–0 | Vie Grand Air Médoc |
| Raincy Sports | 4–3 | CA Boulonnais |
| Olympique Saint-Chamonais | 2–4 | AS Lyonnaise |
| Lyon Olympique Universitaire | 4–1 | Éveil Sportif Dijon |
| ES Mont-de-Marsan | 3–1 | ISC Toulouse |
| Légion Saint-Michel | 8–0 | US Voltaire |
| Paris Star | 3–1 | London County SC |
| Racing Club France | 7–0 | Margarita Club Vésinet |
| Standard AC | 5–1 | Championnet Sports |
| Tour Auvergne | 8–0 | Entente Rennaise |
| Jeunes Chaumont | 1–3 | SS Stade Jean Macé |
| Cercle Athlétique Vitry | 2–3^{1} | British Aviation FC |
| Cadets Bretagne | 4–0^{2} | US Le Mans |
| Olympique Marseille | 7–0^{3} | Herculis Monaco |

Notes

- Note 1: British Aviation were disqualified after a protest from the Union des Sociétés Françaises de Sports Athlétiques. Vitry qualified for the Second round.
- Note 2: The match was due to be played at Le Mans but they had the match postponed and the tie is reversed. Bretagne had the match on 14 October postponed. The CFI award the match to the Cadets.
- Note 3: Monaco had the game postponed to 21 October but withdraw due to a lack of players. The FFF website announced the result as 7–0 to Marseille.

== Second round ==
The sixteen teams that received a bye joined the sixteen winners of the First Round. The matches were played on 4 November 1917 and on a regional basis if possible.

| Team 1 | Score | Team 2 |
|---|---|---|
| AS Brestoise | 4–1 | Tour Auvergne |
| Raincy Sports | 7–0 | Cercle Athlétique de Vitry |
| FC Lyon | 2–2^{aet} | AS Lyonnaise |
| Alliance Vélo Sportive | 2–3 | Lyon Olympique Universitaire |
| Olympique Marseille | 2–0 | CS Terreaux |
| ES Mont-de-Marsan | 5–1 | UA Cognac |
| Olympique Pantin | 4–1 | Légion Saint-Michel |
| AS Française | 13–0 | USA Clichy |
| Cercle Athlétique Paris | 6–1 | CA 14ème arrondissement |
| CA Société Générale | 5–0 | Stade Français |
| Club Français | 2–2^{aet} | Standard AC |
| Étoile Deux Lacs | 2–1 | Gallia Club |
| Paris Star | 2–1 | Patronage Olier |
| Havre Athletic Club | 0–5 | Racing Club France |
| Stade Rennais UC | 3–1 | Cadets Bretagne |
| Union Sportive Suisse | 15–0 | SS Stade Jean Macé |

== Second round first replays ==
The matches were played on 18 November 1917.

| Team 1 | Score | Team 2 |
|---|---|---|
| AS Lyonnaise | 1–1^{aet} | FC Lyon |
| Standard AC | 1–5 | Club Français |

== Second round second replay ==
The match was played on 25 November 1917.

| Team 1 | Score | Team 2 |
|---|---|---|
| FC Lyon | 5–0 | AS Lyonnaise |

== Third round ==
The matches were played on 2 December 1917.

| Team 1 | Score | Team 2 |
|---|---|---|
| Raincy Sports | 2–0 | ES Mont-de-Marsan |
| Olympique Marseille | 0–2 | FC Lyon |
| Lyon Olympique Universitaire | 1–5 | Olympique Pantin |
| AS Française | 8–1 | Étoile Deux Lacs |
| CA Société Générale | 11–0 | Paris Star |
| Club Français | 3–1 | Union Sportive Suisse |
| Racing Club France | 4–1 | Cercle Athlétique Paris |
| Stade Rennais UC | 7–3 | AS Brestoise |

== Quarterfinals ==
The matches were played on 3 February 1918. FC Lyon-Stade Rennais was played at a neutral venue.

| Team 1 | Score | Team 2 |
|---|---|---|
| FC Lyon | 2–1 | Stade Rennais UC |
| Olympique Pantin | 3–2^{aet} | Club Français |
| AS Française | 4–2 | Racing Club France |
| CA Société Générale | 4–1 | Raincy Sports |

== Semifinals ==
The semifinals were both played on 3 March 1918 at neutral venues.

| Team 1 | Score | Team 2 |
|---|---|---|
| Olympique Pantin | 4–1 | CA Société Générale |
| FC Lyon | 4–1 | AS Française |

== Final ==
5 May 1918

| Olympique Pantin | 3–0 | FC Lyon |
|---|---|---|
| Fiévet ?' ?'; Darques ?' |

Légion Saint-Michel field, Paris
Attendance: 2,000
Referee: Jacques Battaille
