= Henri Bard =

French footballer (1892-1951)

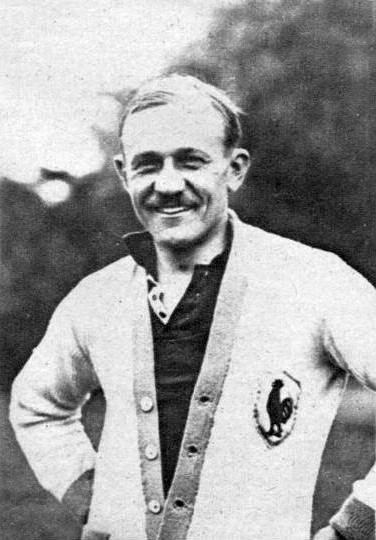
Bard in 1920

Henri Louis Bard (29 April 1892 – 26 January 1951) was a French professional footballer.

Born in Lyon, Bard started his career in Switzerland, when his parents lived there. His first club was Servette. From 1911 he played as forward for Racing Club de France. Two years later he became a member of the France national team.

In 1918 he became a member of Paris club Cercle Athlétique. With this team he won the French Cup in 1920, when he scored both of his team's goals in the final against Le Havre AC. From 1922 to 1925 he played again for Racing Club.

He won 18 caps for France (eight for while in Racing, ten while in Cercle Athlétique) and scored 6 goals from February 1913 to October 1923. World War I interrupted his international career for five years.

He also played for the French team during the Olympic Games of 1920.
