= Olympique de Paris =

- Full name: Olympique de Paris
- Founded: 1908 (as Olympique de Pantin)
- Dissolved: 1926 (merged Red Star Saint-Ouen)
- Ground: Stade Bergeyre; Paris
- Capacity: 15,000
Home colours	Away colours	Third colours

Olympique de Paris was a French association football team based in Paris which existed from 1908 to 1926. Founded with the name Olympique de Pantin, it won the Coupe de France in 1918 and played in the finals in 1919 and 1921. It merged with Red Star Saint-Ouen in 1926.

== History ==
=== Names ===
- 1908–1918 – Olympique de Pantin
- 1918–1926 – Olympique de Paris

== Honours ==
- Coupe de France
  - Winners: 1917–18
  - Runners-up: 1918–19, 1920–21
- Tournoi du Nouvel An
  - Winners (1): 1925
- Tournoi de Pâques
  - Winners (1): 1925
- Tournoi de Pentecôte de Paris
  - Runners-up (1): 1925
