= French Amateur Cycling Federation =

- Sport: List: Association football; Athletics; Cycling
- Jurisdiction: France
- Abbreviation: FCAF
- Founded: 1905
- Headquarters: Paris
- Replaced: List: FFF (Football); FAF (Athletics)
- Closure date: 1919; 106 years ago

The French Cycling and Athletics Federation (French: Fédération Cycliste des Amateurs de France, FCAF) is a French sports federation from the early 20th century. Named the French Amateur Cycling Federation when it was created, it became the French Cycling and Athletics Federation in 1911.

The USFSA, the sports governing body in France, only managed amateur sports, so not boxing or cycling, which had the Union Vélocipédique de France (UVF). However, some UVF clubs founded sports sections other than cycling, and as a result, they left this federation and founded the FCAF, which was initially entirely devoted to cycling, but quickly opened up to athletic sports and set up the FCAF Football Championship in 1906.

== FCAF Football Championship ==
FCAF French Football Championship
- Founded: 1905
- Abolished: 1914; 111 years ago
- Region: Gironde and Paris
- Number of teams: 4
- Last champions: VGA Médoc (1914)
- Most successful club(s): VGA Médoc (3 titles)

The FCAF French Football Championship is a French football competition organized by the French Cycling and Athletics Federation (FCAF). It was contested by the clubs affiliated to this federation, which were mainly located in the North, Gironde, and the Paris region, and it was held annually between 1905 and 1914. In 1907, the FCAF became a member of the French Interfederal Committee (CFI) and the winner of the FCAF Football Championship competed for the Trophée de France, a competition organized by the CFI.

=== 1908–09 season ===
In the semifinals, Star Club de Caudry beats Iris Club Croisien (1–0) at Sin-le-Noble. In the final on 16 May 1909, SC Caudry won the title after defeating the Association sportive d'Alfortville, the champions of the Paris region, by a score of 4–2.

=== 1909–10 season ===
The CA Vitry won the Paris championship on 1 May 1910.

In the semifinals on 8 May 1910, CA Vitry defeated VGA Médoc 5–1 in Bordeaux, while RC Saint-Quentin, champion of Aisne, was set to face Iris Club Croisien, champion of North, in Cambrai, but Iris did not appear and Saint-Quentin thus won by forfeit. In the final on 22 May 22, CA Vitry won the title with a 4–2 win over Saint-Quentin.

== Titles ==
Edition	Winners
1905–06	SM Puteaux
1906–07	SM Puteaux (2)
1907–08	SM Puteaux (3)
1908–09	Star Club de Caudry
1909–10	CA Vitry
1910–11	CA Vitry (2)
1911–12	VGA Médoc
1912–13	VGA Médoc (2)
1913–14	VGA Médoc (3)
