= CASG Paris =

French football club

- Full name: Club Athlétique de Société Générale
- Nicknames: Les Banquiers (The Bankers); Les Généraux (The Generals)
- Founded: 1903; 123 years ago
- Dissolved: 1951; 75 years ago
- Ground: Stade Jean-Bouin
- Chairman: Grézaud Victor
- Manager: Grézaud Victor
Home colours

Club Athlétique de Société Générale, also known as CASG Paris, is a French football club based in Paris. Founded in 1903 it was the sporting club for the bank Société Générale and they got the nickname "The Bankers". In 1917 the team played with a sky blue and white striped jersey. The club changed its name in 1919 to Club athlétique des sports généraux (Athletic Club of General Sports) after the request of FFF. Since then people called them "The Generals". The club were two-times winners of the Coupe de France, in 1919 beating Olympique de Paris by 3–2 and 1925 by defeating FC Rouen by 3–2 (replay match of a previous 1–1 draw), as well as winning the Union des Sociétés Françaises de Sports Athlétiques' Coupe des Alliés in 1915 and 1917, and three successive Coupe Nationales, between 1915 and 1917. The club was dissolved in 1951 as it merged with the Union Athlétique du XVIe Arrondissement (Athletic Union of the 16th district) and in the later years rugby became its only occupation.

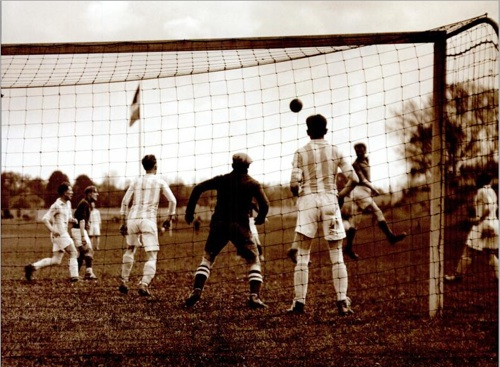
Final of the Coupe de France 1925 against FC Rouen

== Revival ==
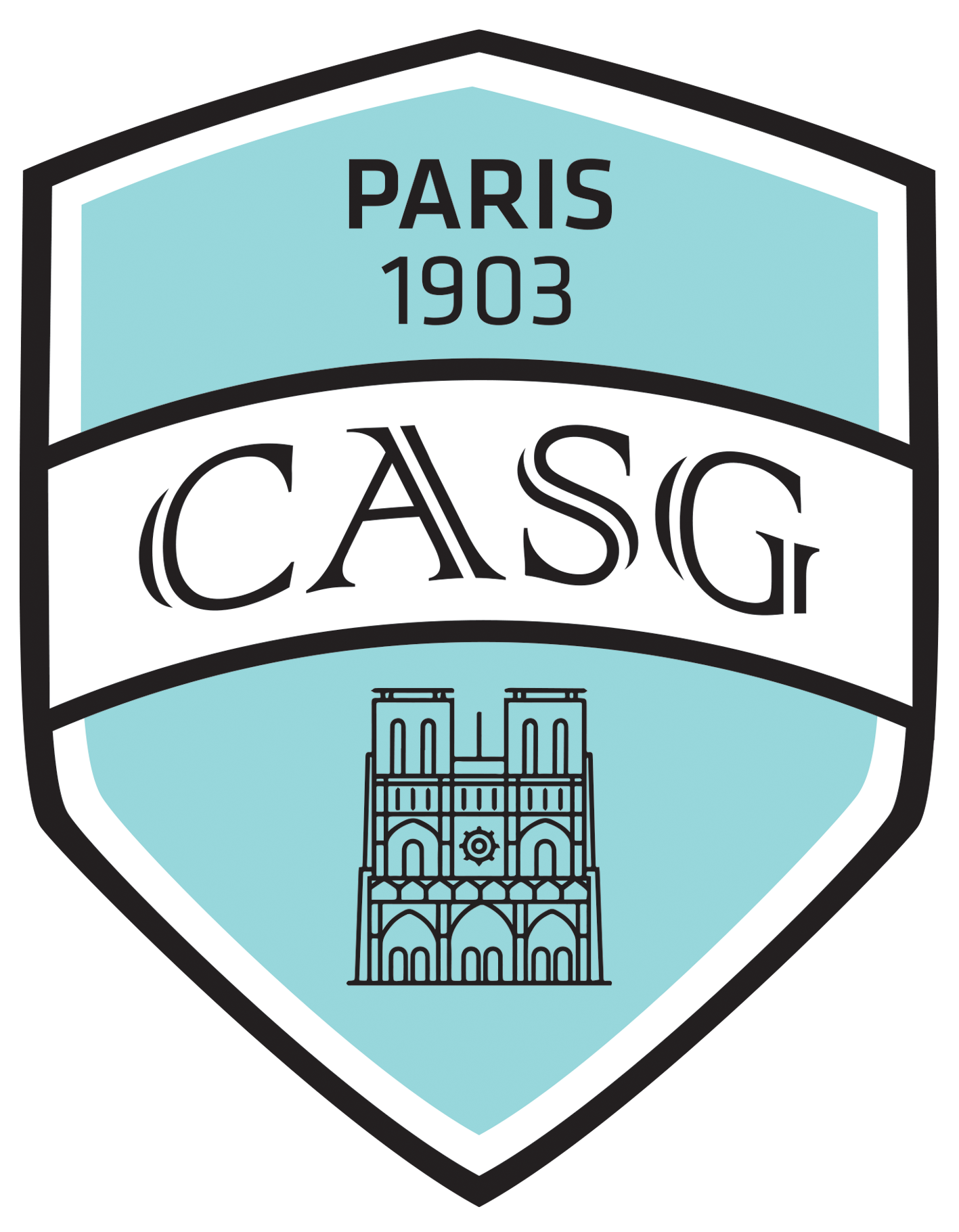
The logo after the club's revival.

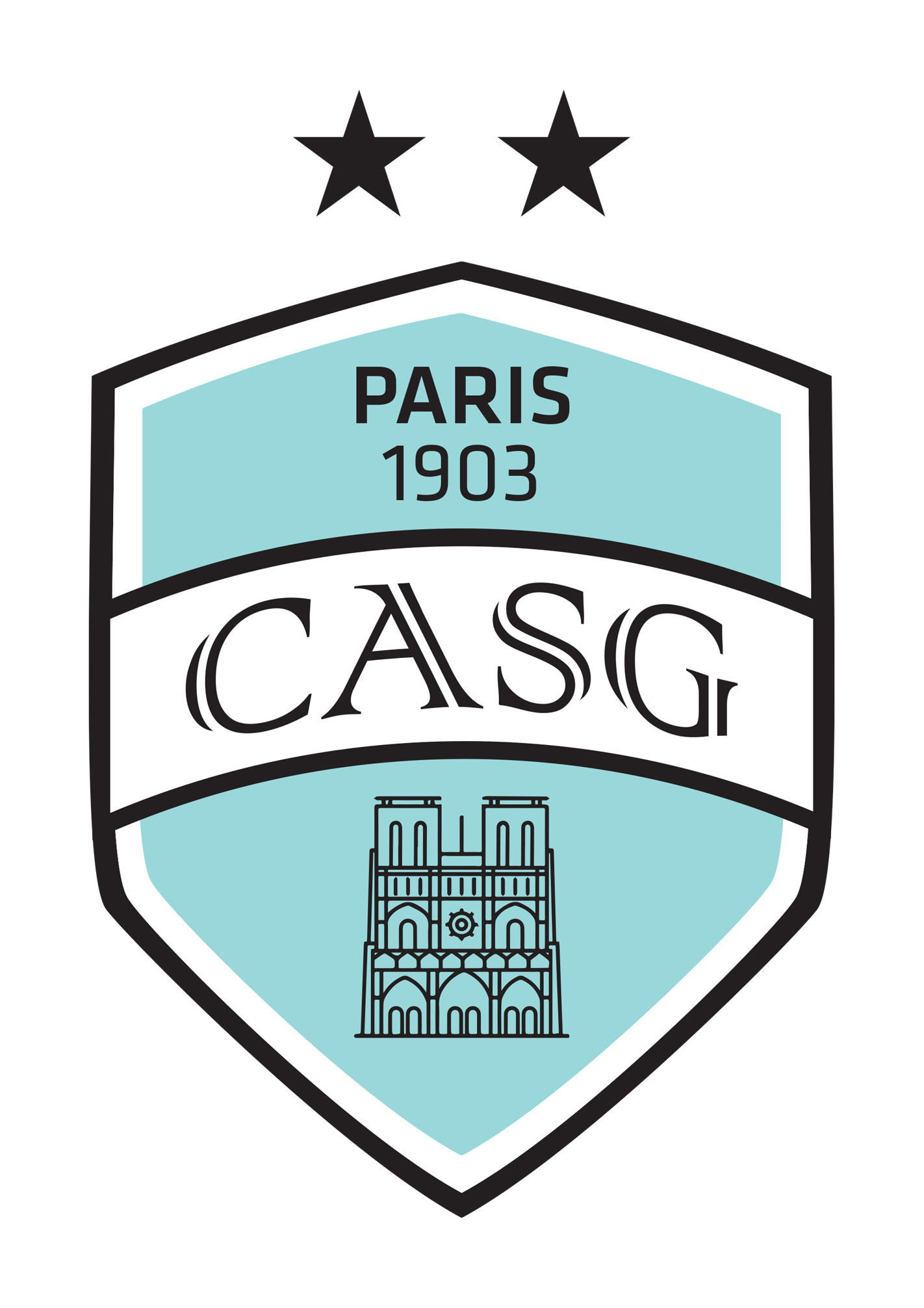
The same logo, but with two stars.

In 2020, the club was revived by Grézaud Victor, who is currently its president and owner.

== Honours ==
- Coupe de France: 2

1919, 1925

- Coupe des Alliés: 2

1915, 1917

- Coupe Nationale: 3

1915, 1916, 1917
