= Vie au Grand Air du Médoc =

Former French sports club

Vie au Grand Air du Médoc (VGAM) was a French football and sports club based in Mérignac, France. Apart from football, it organised cricket, hockey, tennis, cycling, basketball and swimming teams. The motto of the VGAM was "bien faire et laisser dire" ("well done and said").

The club moved to the Stade du Jard ("Stadium of the Jard") in Mérignac, commonly known as the Parc de la Vie au Grand Air, which was a thirteen hectare sports complex.

== Awards ==
- Champion France (CFAF): 1912, 1913, 1914
- Finalist Trophée de France: 1913
- Champion DH Southwest: 1921, 1922

== History ==
VGA Médoc reached the finals of the Trophée de France in 1913, after defeating FC Rouen 2–1 in the semi-finals on 12 May. On 18 May, VGA was defeated by CA Paris 2–1 at the Stade du Jard. In the following season, it reached the 1914 Trophée de France finals and lost to Olympique Lillois 4–1.

After the First World War, VGA shined in the Coupe de France, reaching the semi-finals in 1919 and 1920 and the quarter-finals in 1922. VGA won two championship titles in the Division d'Honneur du Sud-Ouest in 1921 and 1922, before leaving in the regional elite competition in 1925.
