= Gasqueton =

Gasqueton is a French surname. Notable people with the surname include:

- Edouard Gasqueton, French footballer
- Etienne Gasqueton (1886–1973), French footballer
- Henri Gasqueton (1886–1972), French footballer
- Lionel Gasqueton (1891–1966), French footballer
