= Château d'Agassac =

Wine domain in Ludon-Médoc

Coordinates: 44.9675°N 0.6088°W

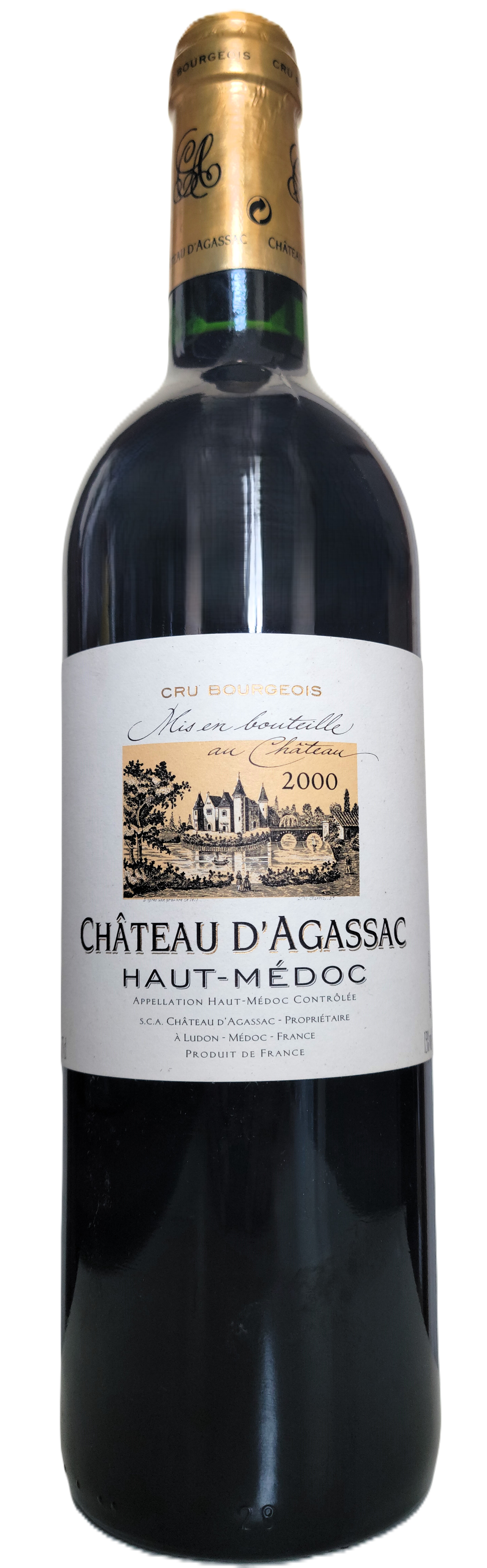
Grand Vin 2000

Château D'Agassac is a Haut-Médoc wine estate located in the village of Ludon-Médoc in the Médoc, 15 minutes away from the city of Bordeaux in France. Its red wine is a Cru Bourgeois ranked "Cru Bourgeois Exceptionnel" in the historic Bordeaux Wine Official Classification of 1932. The property is also a leader in enotourism.

== History ==
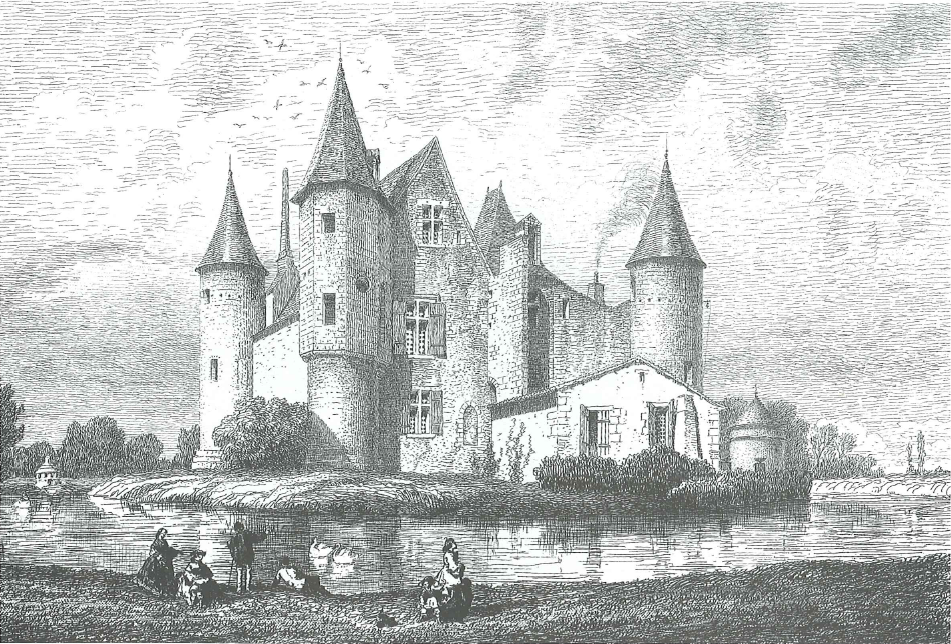
Lithography of Château D'Agassac by Léo Drouyn in 1865

According to a local tradition, a Latin inscription found in the underground galleries of the Château dates its construction back to the 13th century. But the first of its known lords was Guillaume-Raymond d'Agassac in 1172, Lord of Blanquefort.

Beginning in 1238, the Gaillard de Gassac Family was the owner of the seigniory of Agassac which extended more than 800 hectares. The lord was the vassal of the king of England. In 1357, the seigneury was sold to the lordship of Albret and some members of the family came to Agassac, such as Arnaud Amadieu I, Charles II of Albret or Jean II of Albret. From 1580 to 1841, the property belonged to Pommiers Family. One of its members was President of Guyenne Parliament house.

In 1792, the first vines were planted and the winery was created.

In 1841, the estate was purchased by Marcel Richier, a French agricultural engineer. During the 19th century, wines of the property were sold abroad under Château Ludon and Château Pomiès.

In 1961 two members of Capbern-Gasqueton Family, Philippe Capbern-Gasqueton and Henry Capbern-Gasqueton, purchased Château D'Agassac. At the same time, Philippe Capbern-Gasqueton was the owner of Château Calon-Ségur, one of fourteen Troisièmes Crus Classés (Third Growths) in the Bordeaux Wine Official Classification of 1855 in Saint-Estèphe, and Château du Tertre, one of eighteen Cinquièmes Crus (Fifth Growths) in the Bordeaux Wine Official Classification of 1855 in Saint-Estèphe.

In 1996, the winery was purchased by the international insurance group Groupama, who began renovating the estate.

== Geology and Terroir ==
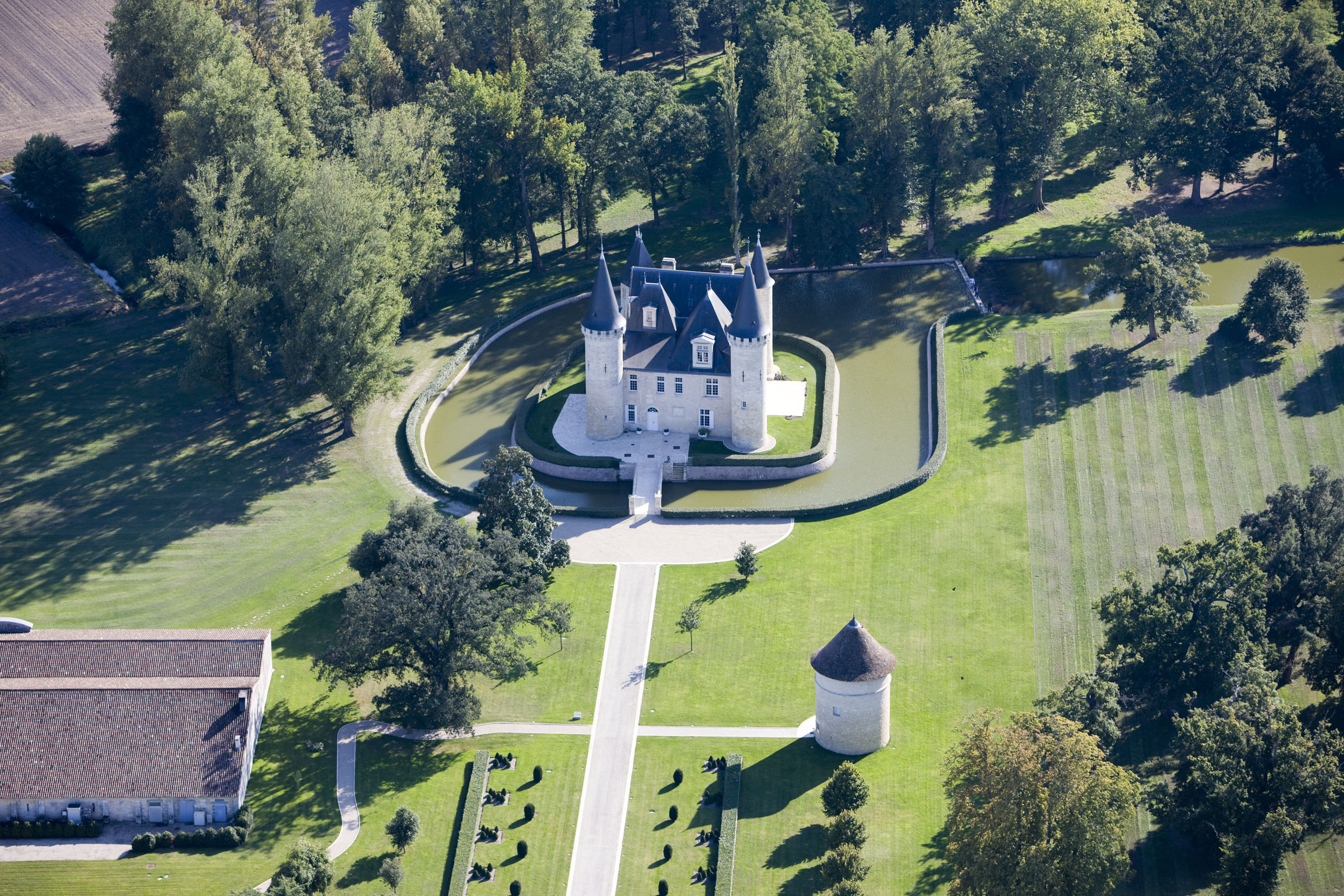

The estate is situated in the southern part of Ludon-Médoc between two gravelly outcrops and an area of sandy gravel.

The first outcrop consists of extremely fine gravel from the river and is characteristic of the commune of Ludon-Médoc. This gravelly structure, which can reach depths of up to 3 meters, lends itself to draining of water and results in a considerably early ripening of the grapes in this part of the vineyard.

The second outcrop is made up of large Gunz gravel which forms a carpet 6 meters deeper than the first outcrop. However, given the greater proportion of clay, it lends itself to full-bodied wines with a more firm backbone.

== Viticulture ==
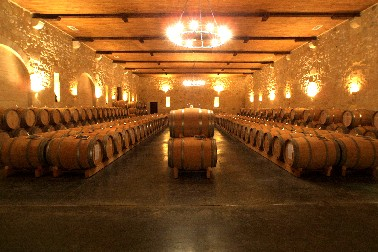
Wine Storehouse

The surface area of the grape plantations is 43 hectares, and contains three different Grape varieties: 50% Merlot, 47% Cabernet Sauvignon and 3% Cabernet Franc. The density of the vineyard is 6,700 shoots per hectare, with each plant having an average age of 25 years. The vines are managed using bud pruning and leaf and bunch thinning, and have acquired the "Terra Vitis" and "HVE 3 (High Environmental Value 3)" certifications for crop management.

== Harvest and Winemaking ==
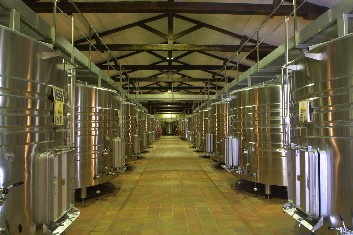
Fermenting Room

After harvest, the grapes are sorted, once in the vineyard and again in the cellar, then they are put in 23 temperature-controlled stainless steel vats with maceration (wine) for 3 to 4 weeks. They are then aged for 12 to 15 months, 60% in new barrels and 40% in vats. The barrels are created by the coopers: Berthomieu, Cadus, Miquel, Doreau, and Baron. The wine is bottled onsite with egg white and light filtering.

== Wines ==
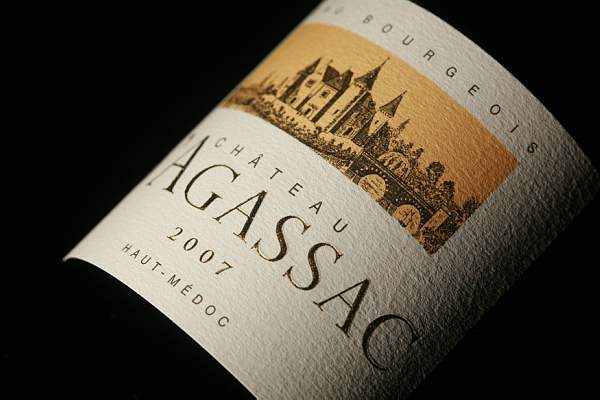
Château D'Agassac - Cru Bourgeois - 2007

D'Agassac is one of the wines of the Haut-Médoc with the best scores and the most awards. In April 2003, it was called "One of the 100 best wines of the World" by the Wine Spectator selection in United States.

The winery produces various wines, including:

- Château D'Agassac: Grand vin of the vineyard, Cru Bourgeois since 1932.
- Château Pomiès-Agassac: second wine of the estate.
- Château Pomiès-Agassac: the other second wine of the property. It is a selection of the finest batches used to produce the Château Pomiès-Agassac "classic"
- L'Agassant D'Agassac: the second label of Château D'Agassac since 2006 made with 90% Merlot grapes.
- Précision D'Agassac: a Vintage Cuvée produced only since 2009.

== Enotourism ==
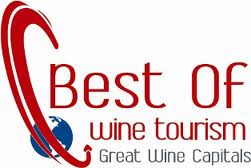
Logo from Best Of Wine Tourism

The estate is open for visiting and wine tasting. Château D'Agassac, a member of the Great Wine Capitals Global Network, has won the Best Of Wine Tourism Contest in 2006, 2007, 2009 and 2012. It is possible to rent the estate for a seminar, dinner or wedding.
