= Henri Gasqueton =

French footballer (1886–1972)

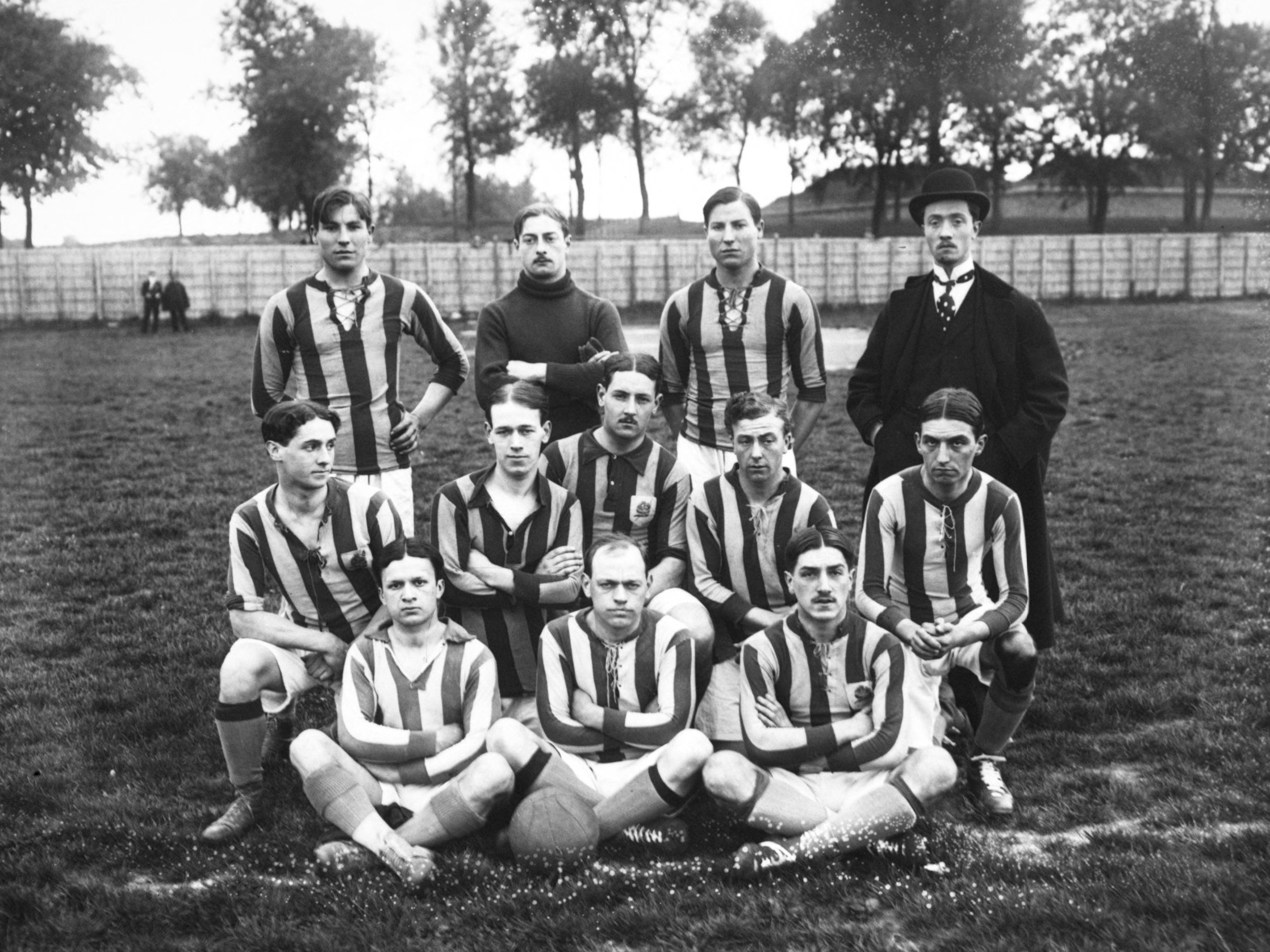
- Gasqueton (standing, black jacket) in 1913

Personal information
- Full name: Henri Capbern-Gasqueton
- Date of birth: 1886
- Place of birth: Roubaix, France
- Date of death: 1972 (aged 85–86)
- Position: Midfielder

Senior career*
Years	Team	Apps	(Gls)
1907–1916	VGA Médoc		
President of VGA Médoc
In office 1910–1920
Preceded by	Gasqueton
President of Ligue du Midi de Football Association
In office 1916–1920
2nd president of the Aquitaine Football League
In office 1920–1924
Preceded by	Guy Morat
Succeeded by	Camille de Rocca-Serra
- * Club domestic league appearances and goals

Henri Capbern-Gasqueton (1886 – 1972) was a French footballer who played as a midfielder for VGA Médoc, and also a sports manager, who served as the president of VGA Médoc in the 1910s, as the founding president of the Ligue du Midi de Football Association, and as the 2nd president of the Aquitaine Football League from 1920 to 1924.

== Early and personal life ==
Henri Gasqueton was born in Roubaix in 1886, as the eldest of five sons from the marriage formed by Hélène Berchon (1862–1932) and Georges Capbern-Gasqueton (1857–1922), a businessman involved in the wine industry and the proprietor of Château Capbern-Gasqueton and Château Calon-Ségur in Saint-Estèphe, Gironde, having bought the latter in 1894, with the help of Charles Hanappier, a négociant from Orléans and also the grandfather of his wife; the 37-hectare vineyard of Calon-Ségur cost them over half a million francs.

Despite having joint ownership, Calon-Ségur was mainly reinvigorated by the Capbern-Gasquetons, beginning with Henri, who inherited the estate after his father died in 1922. His four younger brothers were Etienne, Edouard, Lionel, and Georges (1898–1962). For some reason, several sources list the five Gasqueton brothers in the exact opposite direction, which caused some sources to wrongly claim that Georges was the eldest and the one who inherited the family business; not to mention that their parents were married on 27 July 1885, and Henri was then born in 1886.

Henri married Germaine Lasseverie (1897–1980), and the couple had at least three children, Philippe (1921–1995), Hubert, and Catherine, with Philippe eventually inherited the family business, which he managed until he died in 1995, after which they were managed by his wife Denise, until she died in September 2011.

== Sporting career ==
=== First steps of VGA Médoc ===
In 1907, a group of sportsmen, including the five Capbern-Gasqueton brothers, gathered in Bordeux to found the Vie au Grand Air du Médoc, a multi-sports club which initially only had three sections, football, field hockey, and cricket. They adopted the colours blue and green, the motto "Do well and let the others talk", and the club's name reflects their passion for sport, since it was a reference to La Vie au grand air, which at that time was a major national sports newspaper. The club held its sporting activities at the Domaine des Places, known as Pin Galant.

Initially, the three eldest brothers took turns as the club's president; for instance, when VGAM made a tour to the north of the Iberian Peninsula in March 1911, playing matches in Coruña, Vigo, and then Porto, the team's captain was not the eldest brother, Henri, but Etienne. Ahead of the match against FC Porto on 12 March, the Portuguese newspaper Os Sports Ilustrados stated that VGAM was the "strongest team of the southeast of France, having even defeated English teams this year", and described Henri as a 24-year-old midfielder, Edouard as a 19-year-old half-back, and "E. E. Gasqueton" as a 22-year-old forward and the team's captain. However, at some point in the early 1910s, Henri became the club's president, Henri became the undisputed leader of the club.

=== Trophée de France ===
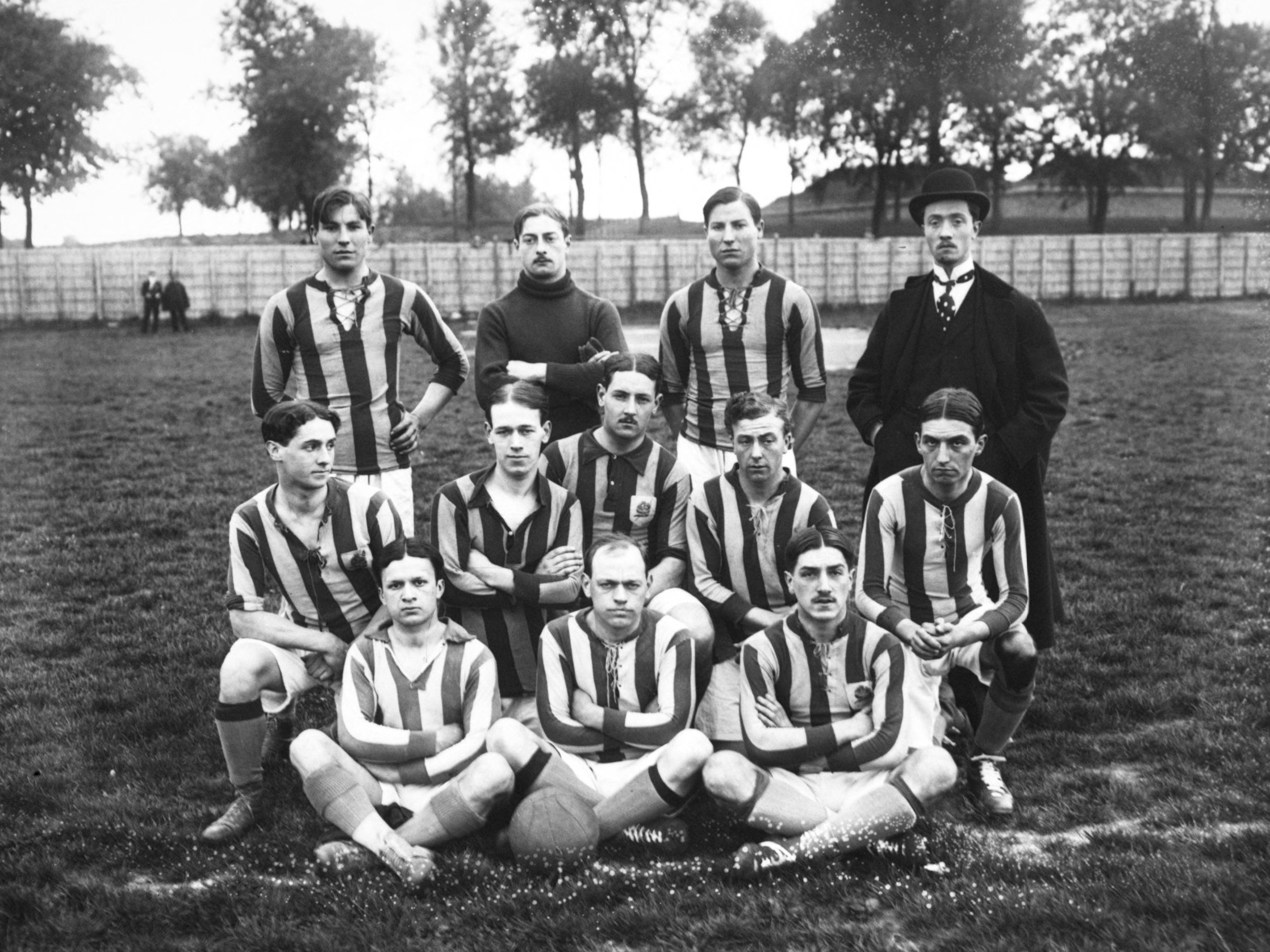
Gasqueton (standing, black jacket) with the Médoc squad on 12 May 1913, ahead of its Trophée de France semifinal.

The club's football section affiliated with French Amateur Cycling Federation (FCAF), and due to it being a minor federation in terms of football, Médoc easily became its best team, comfortably winning a three-peat of FCAF championships between 1912 and 1914; in fact, the club even won the 1914 title without playing a single match. Nevertheless, these performances allowed the club to qualify for the Trophée de France, an inter-federation national competition organized by the CFI.

In May 1913, the president of VGA Médoc, which the local press wrongly identified as "A. Gasqueton", sent a letter to CFI's president, Charles Simon, claiming that the regulations of the 1913 Trophée de France had been violated, which "will cause us and have already caused us material and economic damage". His two younger brothers Edouard and Etienne helped Médoc reach the 1913 final, which ended in a 2–1 loss to CA Paris.

On the eve of the 1914 Trophée de France final against Olympique Lillois, Gasqueton announced that Groselle, a very bad full-back, was unavailable, but his replacement was only revealed at the start of the match, the Englishman Albert Clarke, from Plumstead, so the leaders of OL raised protests which delayed the start of the final; Médoc still lost 3–0. When addressing this incident, the journalists from the North were not gentle, stating that "Gasqueton is, it seems, a future attorney, and as such, he likes to slip through the tight mesh of the regulations, and as such, he also likes bureaucracy, distinguishing himself by sending a lot of stamped papers to the CFI".

On 7 May 1916, Henri started in the semifinals of the 1916 Coupe de France against Olympique de Pantin, doing so alongside his older brothers Edouard and Lionel; Médoc lost 1–0 after extra-time.

=== President of LMFA ===
In December 1916, VGA Médoc and its president, Henri Gasqueton, were at the origin of the creation of the Ligue du Midi de Football Association (LMFA), a league that brought together clubs from the South-West and Languedoc, and Gasqueton was naturally appointed as its first president. The VGA Médoc won a three-peat of LMFA championships between 1917 and 1919; his older brothers Lionel and Edouard started in the latter final, which ended in a 2–1 win over Stade Cettois. This league was refused recognition by the USFSA, which led them to affiliate with Jules Rimet's LFA, and because of this, Gasqueton became the vice-president of the LFA shortly after. Similarly, the Ligue de Lorraine de Football Association (LEFA) joined the LFA, who thus decided to "nationalize" itself and organized its first French Championship in 1918, which was won by Médoc, captained by his brother Edouard, after a 4–3 win over Club Français in the final on 3 May, thus completing a double in 1918. This final was initially meant to have been the first Inter-Ligue Paris-Midi match played in a city of the South, but it was ultimately held in Red Star's Stade de Paris in Saint-Ouen.

Gasqueton was the first president of the commission of the Coupe de France, which was created in 1917–18, with VGAM being the only Bordeaux club registered at the start. In the 1919–20 Coupe de France, VGAM reached the semifinal, but despite having three Gasqueton brothers in the team (Lionel, Ed, and Et), his team lost 2–1 to the eventual champions CA Paris.

=== Stade du Jard ===
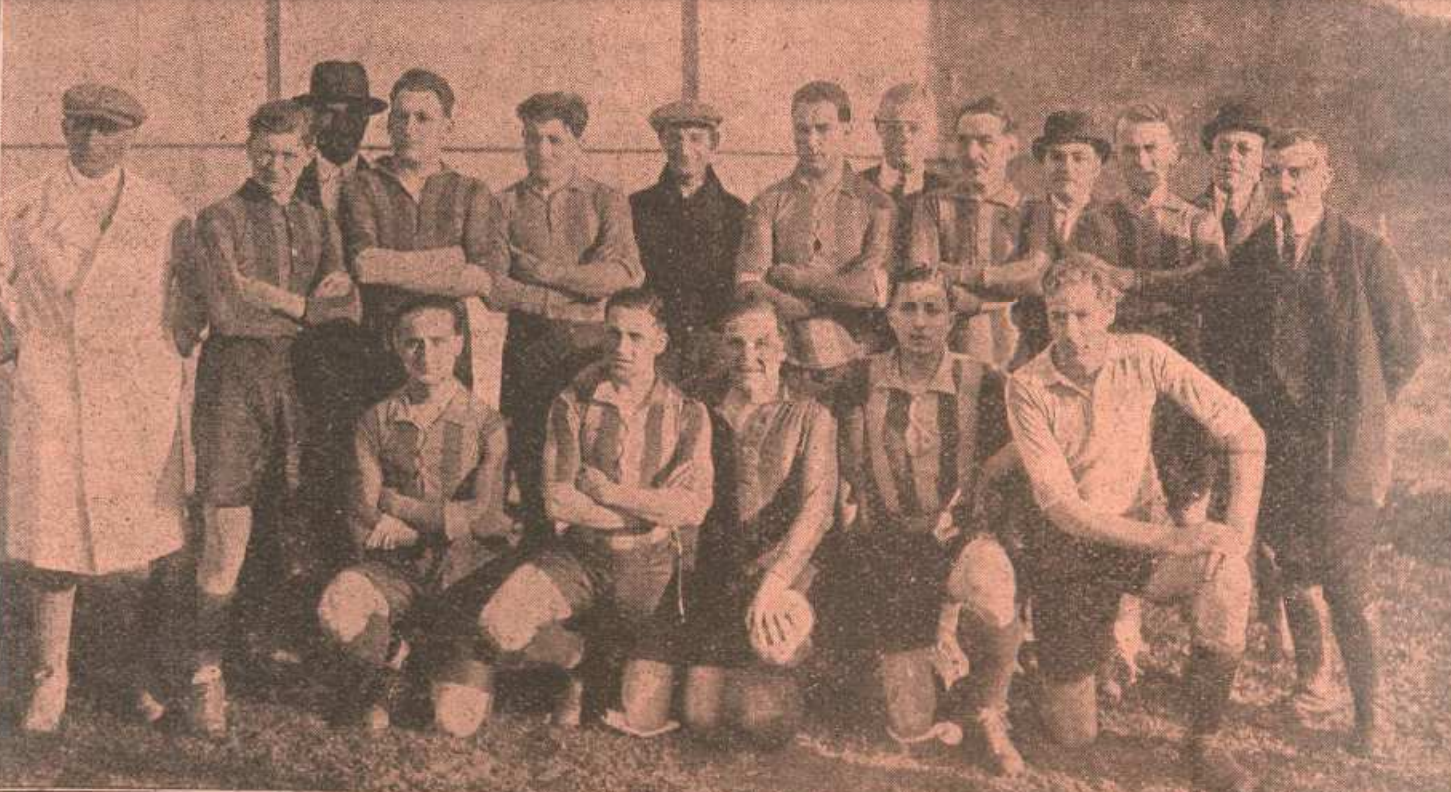
Gasqueton (standing, third from left) with the Médoc football staff in 1928.

In September 1919, the VGAM moved from the Puygalan estate to the Jard estate in Mérignac, which had been recently bought by the Capbern-Gasqueton family, with Henri then developing part of the 13 hectares of the estate into multi-sports grounds, including football pitches, hockey fields, tennis courts and other facilities. The complex was then commonly called the Parc de la Vie au Grand Air or Parc des Sports de Bordeaux.

From 1919 onwards, the Gasqueton brothers worked hard to organize, without telephone, football and field hockey matches at Jard, and likewise, in the 1920s and 1930s, major national and international football matches were organized there. Henri and his younger brothers Lionel and Etienne were still part of the club's football staff in May 1928, as well as their youngest sibling Georges, then aged 30, who was still playing for the team.

In the 1930s, Gasqueton began practicing media solicitation in order to keep VGA Médoc alive and relevant, and even paid the famous Bordeaux printing house Péchade to make several advertising postcards of the Jard in the 1930s (currently preserved in the Municipal Archives of Mérignac), on the back of which showed the Jard's aerial view along with the quote "the largest sports facility in the Bordeaux region".

=== President of the Aquitaine Football League ===
In 1919, the French Football Federation (FFF) was created and the territory of the LMFA was split in two, and while the societies of the eastern part joined the newly established Ligue du Sud-Est, the western part eventually founded the Ligue du Sud-Ouest (currently known as Aquitaine Football League), which was officially established on 25 July 1919, and its first president, Guy Moyat, was replaced in the following season by Gasqueton, who held this position for four years, until 1924, when he was replaced by the lawyer Camille de Rocca-Serra. A few years later, his younger brother Etienne, became the league's sixth president, holding this position for two years between 1931 and 1933.

=== Field Hockey ===
In 1916, Gasqueton introduced field hockey to Bordeaux via Eveleyn Hutchinson, who together with her sister Stella were the first female hockey players in the region. The Gasqueton brothers participated very actively in the development and feminization of this sport, with the club's first women's hockey team dating to 1917–18. For instance, in November 1924, the start of autumn marked the return of field hockey, and the local press showed enthusiasm with the "resurrection of the women's section of the VGA Médoc", reporting about a little training at Jard, and stating that "before we can judge the general appearance of the team, we must await the eagerly awaited returns of Mr. Henri and Etienne Gasqueton, Stella Hutchison and the remarkable goalkeeper Violette Nash".

The decrease in VGAM's football activity and its end in 1940–41 (removed from the FFF in 1953) favored the expansion of field hockey, since Gasqueton reorganized the distribution of his fields, two of which were rented for corporate football practice, the others allocated to hockey. This change paid off as its women's field hockey team was French champion in 1946 and 1948, with a squad that included five internationals and Catherine Capbern Gasqueton, daughter of Henri.

For four decades, all of Bordeaux hockey was practiced on the Jard turf, with Gasqueton having rented the grounds to Villa Primrose and the Girondins de Bordeaux in 1953. In 1954, regional TV filmed a hockey match between Villa Primrose and the Racing Club de France on the Jard turf for the first time. The influx of population in Mérignac created a strong demand for real estate, so in 1971 the Capbern-Gasqueton family sold its estate in two parts: seven hectares to the Municipality of Mérignac, including the buildings and the center of the Jard stade; and the six hectares of land north and south to the Lyon developer René Cornillier & Company. Currently, the old infrastructures built by the Gasquetons are more or less ruined.

== Journalist career ==
In addition, Gasqueton founded the monthly Théâtre-Sports in January 1909, and supervised its publication with his brothers until 1968, to publish articles relating to the life of the VGAM. He also launched his club into cinema in 1951 to develop the equestrian activity of the VGAM, directed by his son Hubert, with the producer Couzinet.

== Death ==
In Gasqueton's obituary, published on 3 February 1972 in the Sud-Ouest, it is written: "He was an extraordinary personality, devoted body and soul to his club. He made the Jard an oasis for those who were 18 years old (1922) and it was the youth of thousands of adolescents".
