= Château Lescombes =

Château in Nouvelle-Aquitaine, France

Coordinates: 44°52′51″N 0°39′13″W

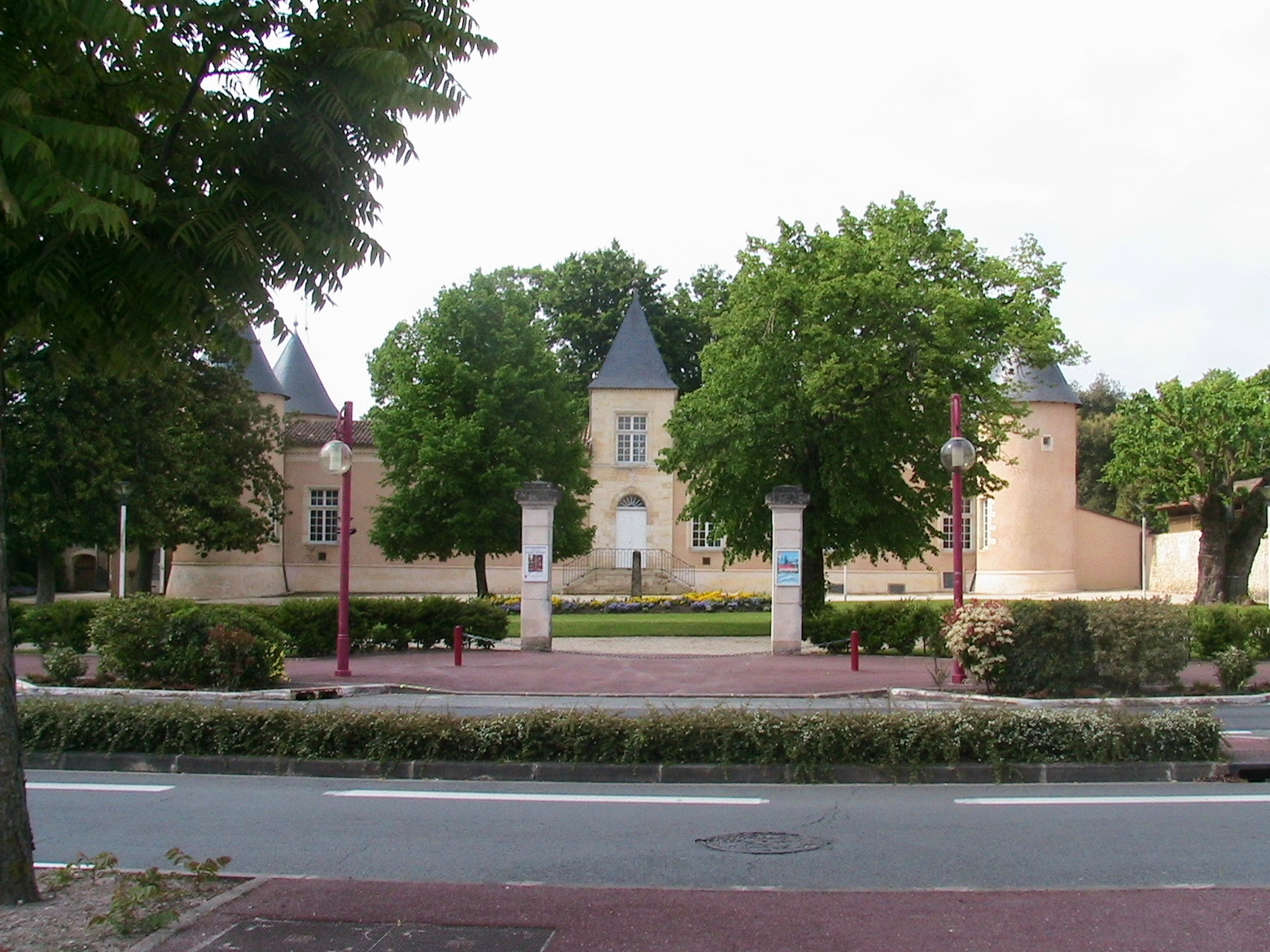

The Château Lescombes is a château in Eysines, Gironde, Nouvelle-Aquitaine, France. It dates to the 17th century. The dovecote was listed as a monument historique in 1992.
