= JAVP =

French IPTV service

Just Another Video Player (JAVP), formerly ArTV.watch, is an open-source vibe-coded (Note: "JAVP project". GitHub.) IPTV service owned by Cubeweb, a multi-channel network based out of Bordeaux. The service is notable for a highly publicized arrest of a juvenile in 2017 following the monetization of pirated content.

== Early history ==
After being suggested by some internet friends; Vincent Durousseau (born 3 August, 2001; from Eysines), known online as Xem or Xemles; created a service during April 2017 to bypass geo-restrictions in regards to watching French television. As the service grew in popularity and also in the number of channels offered, Durousseau turned to ad-revenue to support the cost of expanding infrastructure, as English-language and Japanese channels were added. It is estimated that between 100,000 to 500,000 used the service in its three months of operation.

The etymology of ArTV was from l'action and réaction.

== Arrest ==
Around 7:00 CEST, law enforcement arrested Durousseau at his home. Durousseau faced a €300,000 fine and up to three years in jail. The police investigation was done in collaboration with an agency dedicated to the interests of public TV broadcasters.

== Later history ==
Durousseau would go on to found Cubeweb on the 1st of June 2024, following his popularity as a6d, a Minecraft content creator.
