= Lionel Gasqueton =

French footballer

Personal information
- Full name: Lionel Capbern-Gasqueton
- Date of birth: Mid-1890s
- Place of birth: Roubaix, France
- Position: Forward

Senior career*
Years	Team	Apps	(Gls)
1916–1920	VGA Médoc		
- * Club domestic league appearances and goals

Lionel Capbern-Gasqueton was a French footballer who played as a forward for VGA Médoc in the early 20th century.

== Early and personal life ==
Lionel Gasqueton was born in Roubaix, as the fourth of five sons from the marriage formed by Hélène Berchon (1862–1932) and Georges Capbern-Gasqueton (1857–1922), a businessman involved in the wine industry and the proprietor of Château Capbern-Gasqueton and Château Calon-Ségur in Saint-Estèphe, Gironde, having bought the latter in 1894, with the help of Charles Hanappier, a négociant from Orléans and also the grandfather of his wife; the 37-hectare vineyard of Calon-Ségur cost them over half a million francs.

Despite having joint ownership, Calon-Ségur was mainly reinvigorated by the Capbern-Gasquetons, beginning with the eldest brother, Henri, who inherited the estate after their father died in 1922. The other three brothers were the older Etienne and Edouard, and the younger Georges (1898–1962).

Lionel married Marthe Fournier.

== Career ==
In 1907, a group of sportsmen, including the five Capbern-Gasqueton brothers, gathered in Bordeux to found the Vie au Grand Air du Médoc, a multi-sports club which initially only had three sections, football, field hockey, and cricket. They adopted the colours blue and green, and the motto "Do well and let the others talk". The club's name reflects their passion for sport, since it was a reference to La Vie au grand air, which at that time was a major national sports newspaper. The club held its sporting activities at the Domaine des Places, known as Pin Galant.

On 7 May 1916, Lionel, still in his early 20s, started in the semifinals of the 1916 Coupe de France against Olympique de Pantin, doing so alongside his older brothers Henri and Edouard; Médoc lost 1–0 after extra-time.

In December 1916, his older brother Henri, as the president of VGA Médoc, was at the origin of the creation of the Ligue du Midi de Football Association (LMFA), bringing together clubs from the South-West and Languedoc. The VGA Médoc won a three-peat of LMFA championships between 1917 and 1919; in the latter final, Lionel started as a forward alongside his older brother Edouard (midfield), and scored the opening goal in a 2–1 win over Stade Cettois. This league was refused recognition by the USFSA, so it affiliated with Jules Rimet's LFA, which "nationalized" itself and organized its first French Championship in 1918, and Médoc reached the final against Club Français on 3 May, in which Lionel, then at the front for two years, completed the eleven at the last moment, while his older brother Edouard, although injured, started as the captain. They were able to overcome this issues, however, and it was he who started the play for his side's fourth goal in an eventual 4–3 win, thus completing a double in 1918. In the 1919 final, however, his club lost to Rimet's Red Star.

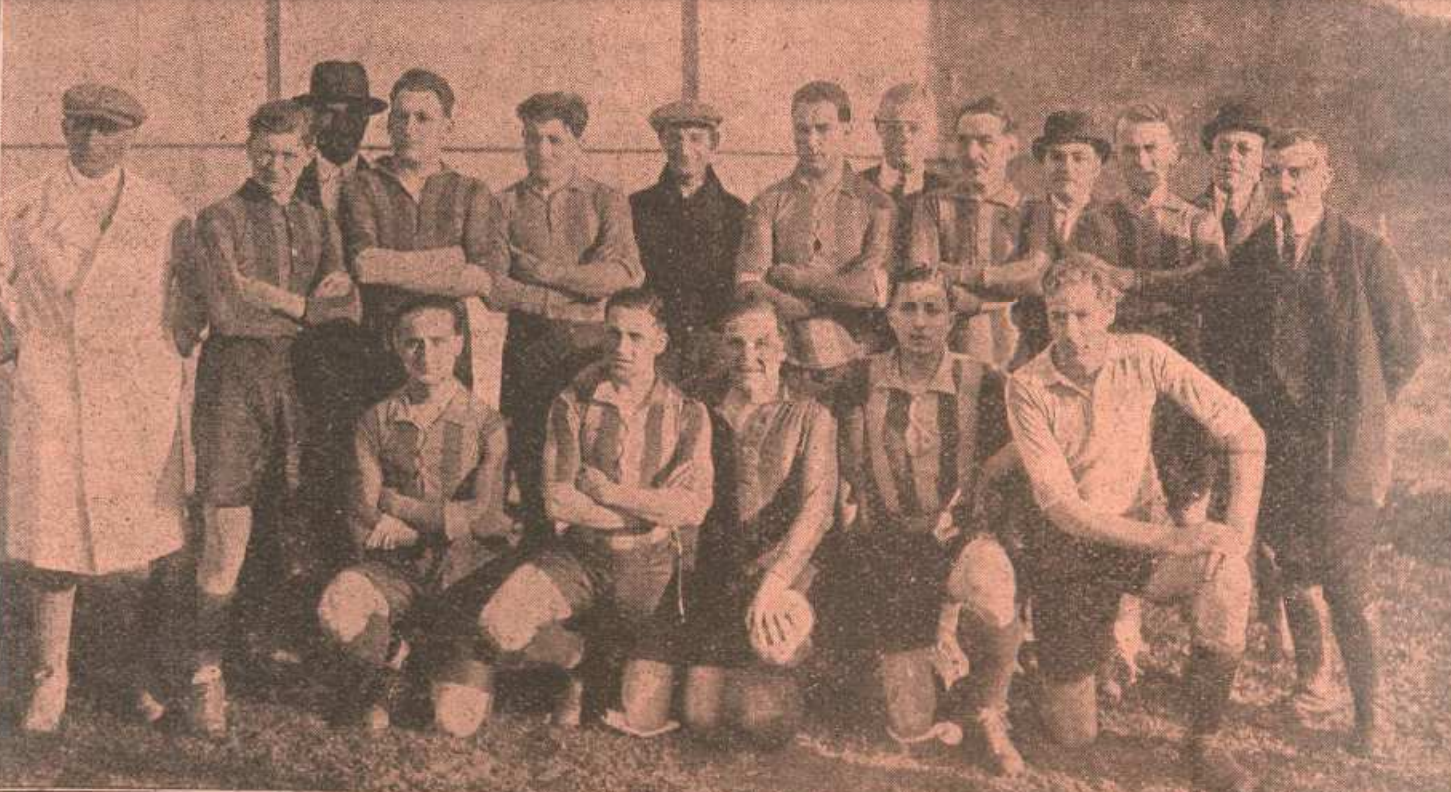
Gasqueton (standing, fifth from right) with the Médoc football staff in 1928.

In September 1919, the VGAM moved from the Puygalan estate to the Jard estate in Mérignac, which had been recently bought by the Capbern-Gasqueton family, who worked hard to organize, without telephone, football and field hockey matches at Jard, and likewise, in the 1920s and 1930s, major national and international football matches were organized there.

On 11 April 1920, Lionel started in the semifinals of the 1919–20 Coupe de France, but despite doing so alongside his older brothers Edouard and Etienne, Médoc lost 2–1 to the eventual champions CA Paris. Lionel and his older brothers Henri and Etienne were still part of the club's football staff in May 1928, as well as their youngest sibling Georges, then aged 30, who was still playing for the team.

== Honours ==
VGA Médoc

- Ligue du Midi de Football Association: 1917, 1918, 1919
- LFA National Championship: 1917–18
