= Etienne Gasqueton =

French footballer and referee

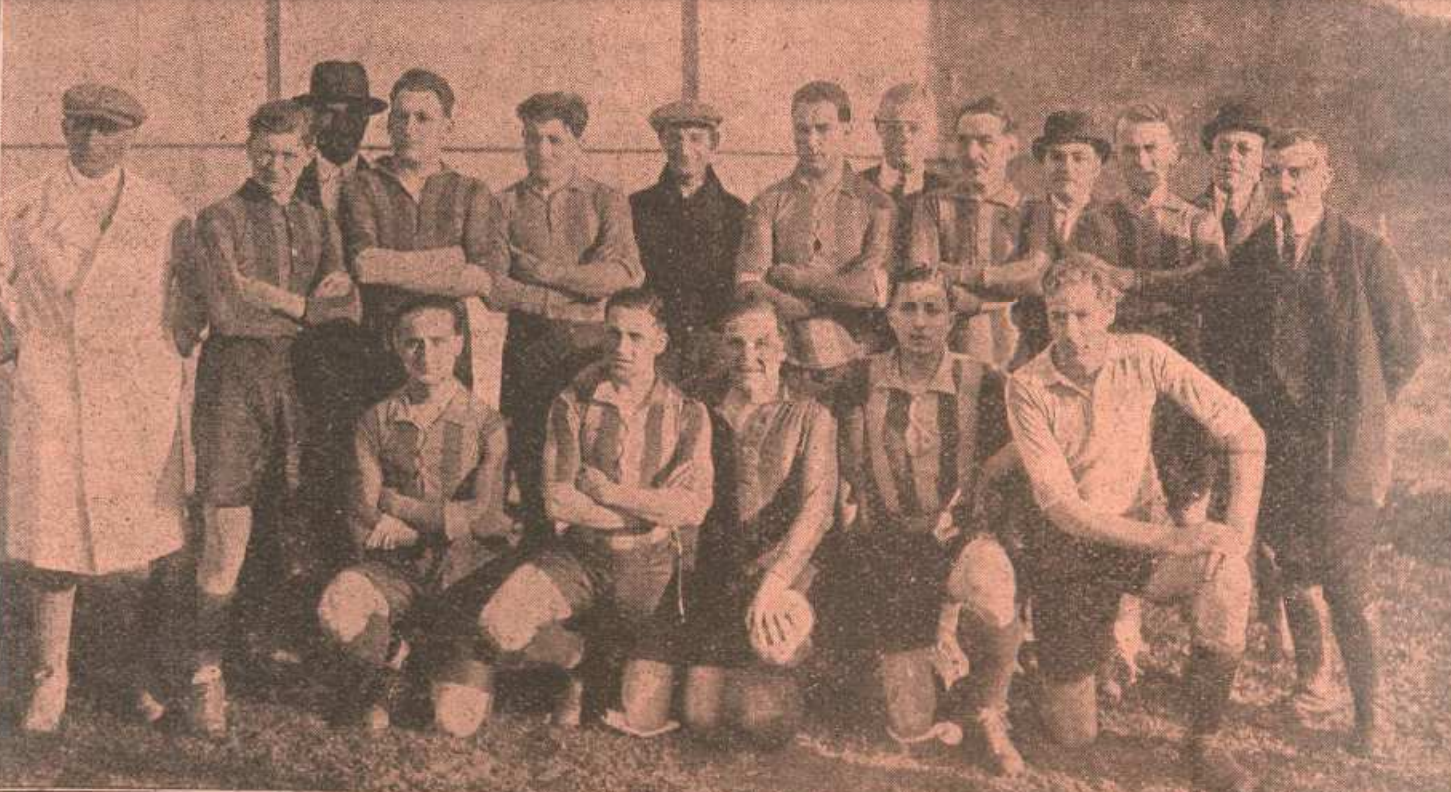
- Gasqueton (standing, white jacket) in 1928

Personal information
- Full name: Etienne Capbern-Gasqueton
- Date of birth: c. 1888
- Place of birth: Roubaix, France
- Date of death: Unknown
- Position: Forward

Senior career*
Years	Team	Apps	(Gls)
1907–1920	VGA Médoc		
6th President of the Aquitaine Football League
In office 1931–1933
Preceded by	Roger Roujean
Succeeded by	Mr. Buelly
- * Club domestic league appearances and goals

Etienne Capbern-Gasqueton was a French footballer who played as a forward for VGA Médoc in the early 20th century. He later worked as a referee, officiating matches in the French first division.

== Early and personal life ==
Etienne Gasqueton was born in Roubaix, as the second of five sons from the marriage formed by Hélène Berchon (1862–1932) and Georges Capbern-Gasqueton (1857–1922), a businessman involved in the wine industry and the proprietor of Château Capbern-Gasqueton and Château Calon-Ségur in Saint-Estèphe, Gironde, having bought the latter in 1894, with the help of Charles Hanappier, a négociant from Orléans and also the grandfather of his wife; the 37-hectare vineyard of Calon-Ségur cost them over half a million francs.

Despite having joint ownership, Calon-Ségur was mainly reinvigorated by the Capbern-Gasquetons, beginning with the eldest brother, Henri, who inherited the estate after their father died in 1922. His three younger brothers were Edouard, Lionel, and Georges (1898–1962).

Etienne married Germaine Oudenot.

== Sporting career ==
=== Playing career ===
In 1907, a group of sportsmen, including the five Capbern-Gasqueton brothers, gathered in Bordeux to found the Vie au Grand Air du Médoc, a multi-sports club which initially only had three sections, football, field hockey, and cricket. They adopted the colours blue and green, and the motto "Do well and let the others talk". The club's name reflects their passion for sport, since it was a reference to La Vie au grand air, which at that time was a major national sports newspaper. The club held its sporting activities at the Domaine des Places, known as Pin Galant.

Initially, the three eldest brothers took turns as the club's president; for instance, when VGAM made a tour to the north of the Iberian Peninsula in March 1911, playing matches in Coruña, Vigo, and then Porto, the team's captain was not the eldest brother, Henri, but Etienne. Ahead of the match against FC Porto on 12 March, the Portuguese newspaper Os Sports Ilustrados stated that VGAM was the "strongest team of the southeast of France, having even defeated English teams this year", and described Henri as a 24-year-old midfielder, Edouard as a 19-year-old half-back, and "E. E. Gasqueton" as a 22-year-old forward and the team's captain.

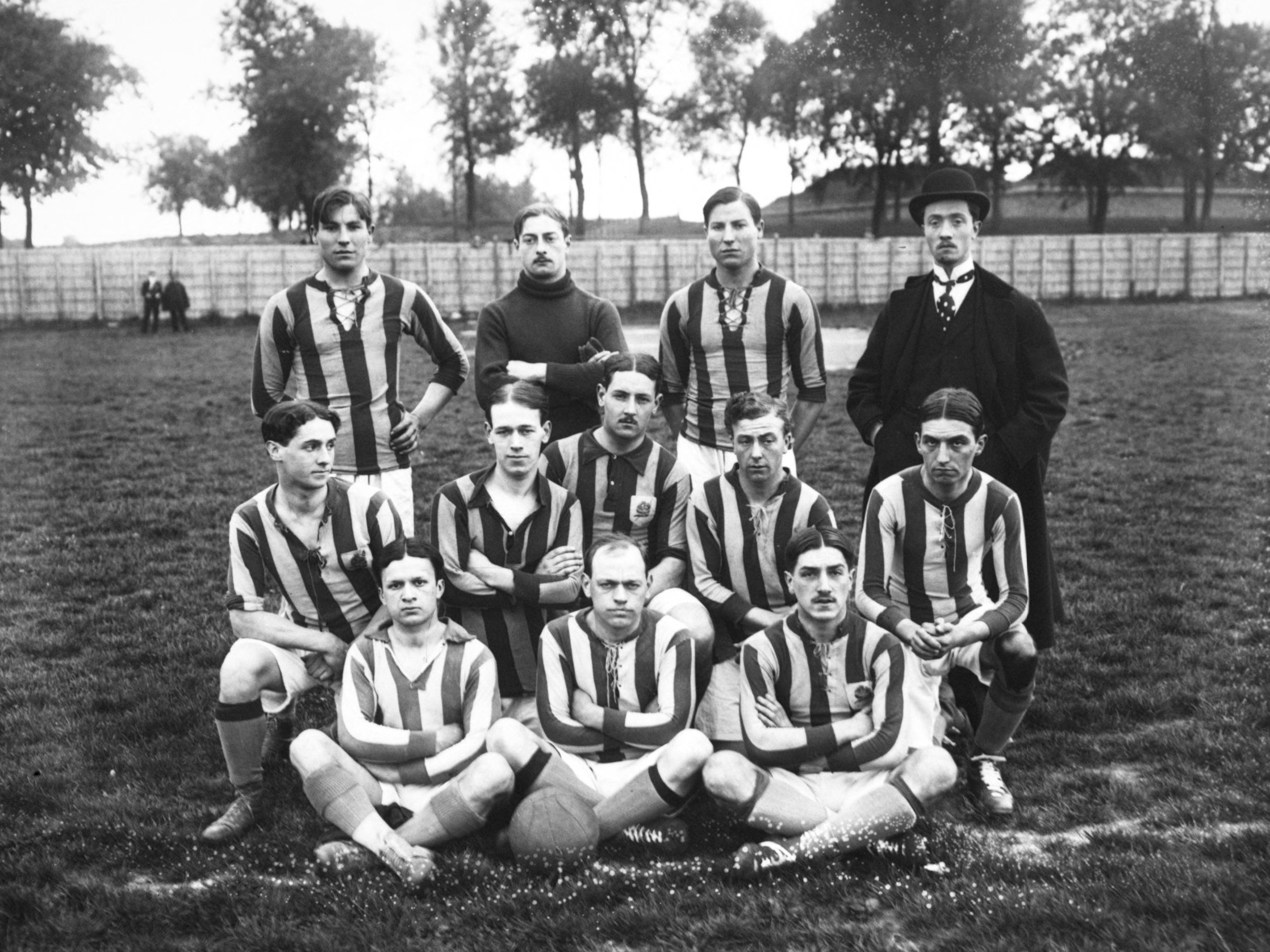
Gasqueton with the Médoc squad on 12 May 1913, ahead of its Trophée de France semifinal.

The club's football section affiliated with French Amateur Cycling Federation (FCAF), a minor federation in terms of football, which allowed Médoc to become its best team easily, comfortably winning a three-peat of FCAF championships between 1912 and 1914; in fact, the club even won the 1914 title without playing a single match. Nevertheless, these performances allowed the club to qualify for the Trophée de France, an inter-federation national competition organized by the CFI. Etienne played in the 1913 final on 18 May, starting as a forward alongside his brother Edouard (midfield), and it was one of his crosses that resulted in the opening goal of the match, but his team eventually lost 1–2 to CA Paris. In the following year, on 26 April, he started in the final of the 1914 Trophée de France, and even though they lost 4–1 to Olympique Lillois, he was described as one of the team's best players.

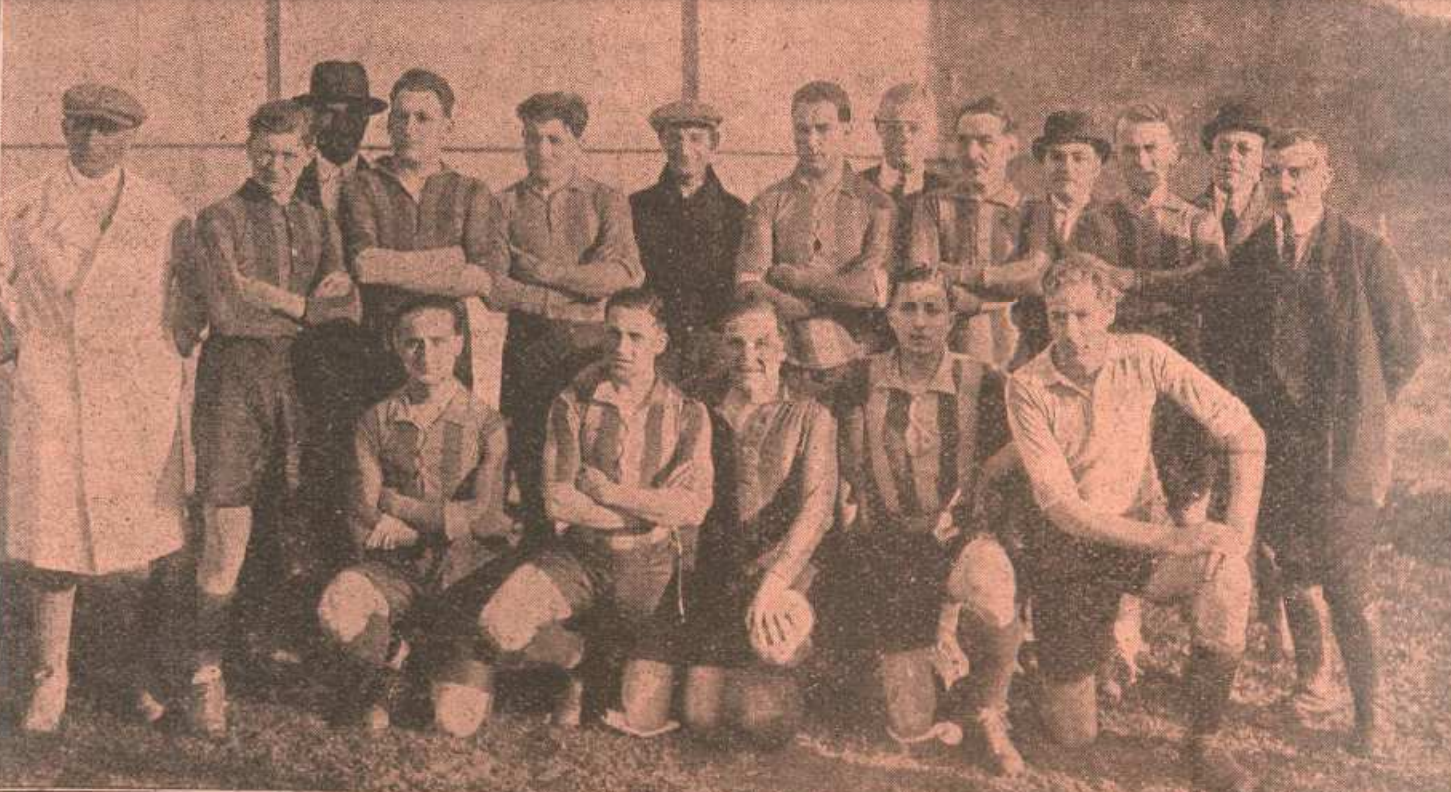
Gasqueton (standing, white jacket) with the Médoc football staff in 1928.

In September 1919, the VGAM moved from the Puygalan estate to the Jard estate in Mérignac, which had been recently bought by the Capbern-Gasqueton family, who worked hard to organize, without telephone, football and field hockey matches at Jard, and likewise, in the 1920s and 1930s, major national and international football matches were organized there.

On 11 April 1920, Etienne started in the semifinals of the 1919–20 Coupe de France, but despite doing so alongside his younger brothers Edouard and Lionel, Médoc lost 1–2 to the eventual champions CA Paris. Etienne and his brothers Lionel and Henri were still part of the club's football staff in May 1928, as well as their youngest sibling Georges, then aged 30, who was still playing for the team.

=== Field Hockey ===
In November 1924, the start of autumn marked the return of field hockey, and the local press showed enthusiasm with the "resurrection of the women's section of the VGA Médoc", reporting about a little training at Jard, and stating that "before we can judge the general appearance of the team, we must await the eagerly awaited returns of Mr. Henri and Etienne Gasqueton, Stella Hutchison and the remarkable goalkeeper Violette Nash".

=== President of the Aquitaine Football League ===
In 1931, Gasqueton was named the 6th president of the Aquitaine Football League, replacing Roger Roujean, a position that he held for two years, until 1933. His presidency was marked by the inaugural edition of the French professional championship in 1932–33, in which he worked as a referee; for instance, he oversaw a league fixture between Olympique de Merseille and Club Français (5–1) on 11 December 1932, and in the following year, on 10 December 1933, he officiated a Coupe de France round of 32 match between OM and third division club US Cazères, which ended in a 14–1 win; these were the only OM matches that he refereed, which means that "Les Olympiens" scored 9.5 goals per game in matches refereed by him.

== Later life ==
In his later years, he dedicated himself to the family business in the wine industry, opening a distillery called Grand Empereur, which in the early 1960s bottled a wine bottle of Cognac named Qualité Sacre ("Sacre Quality").

== Honours ==
VGA Médoc

- FCAF Football Championship:
  - Champion (3): 1912, 1913, and 1914
- Trophée de France:
  - Runner-up (2): 1913 and 1914
