= Edouard Gasqueton =

French footballer

Personal information
- Full name: Edouard Capbern-Gasqueton
- Date of birth: c. 1891
- Place of birth: Roubaix, France
- Date of death: Unknown
- Position: Midfielder

Senior career*
Years	Team	Apps	(Gls)
1907–1920	VGA Médoc		
- * Club domestic league appearances and goals

Edouard Capbern-Gasqueton was a French footballer who played as a midfielder for VGA Médoc in the early 20th century.

== Early and personal life ==
Edouard Gasqueton was born in Roubaix, as the third of five sons from the marriage formed by Hélène Berchon (1862–1932) and Georges Capbern-Gasqueton (1857–1922), a businessman involved in the wine industry and the proprietor of Château Capbern-Gasqueton and Château Calon-Ségur in Saint-Estèphe, Gironde, having bought the latter in 1894, with the help of Charles Hanappier, a négociant from Orléans and also the grandfather of his wife; the 37-hectare vineyard of Calon-Ségur cost them over half a million francs.

Despite having joint ownership, Calon-Ségur was mainly reinvigorated by the Capbern-Gasquetons, beginning with the eldest brother, Henri, who inherited the estate after their father died in 1922. The other three brothers were the older Etienne, and the younger Lionel and Georges (1898–1962).

Edouard married Eliane Hanappier, a distant relative on his mother's side.

== Playing career ==
In 1907, a group of sportsmen, including the five Capbern-Gasqueton brothers, gathered in Bordeux to found the Vie au Grand Air du Médoc, a multi-sports club which initially only had three sections, football, field hockey, and cricket. They adopted the colours blue and green, and the motto "Do well and let the others talk". The club's name reflects their passion for sport, since it was a reference to La Vie au grand air, which at that time was a major national sports newspaper. The club held its sporting activities at the Domaine des Places, known as Pin Galant.

Initially, the three eldest brothers took turns as the club's president; for instance, when VGAM made a tour to the north of the Iberian Peninsula in March 1911, playing matches in Coruña, Vigo, and then Porto, the team's captain was not the eldest brother, Henri, but Etienne. Ahead of the match against FC Porto on 12 March, the Portuguese newspaper Os Sports Ilustrados stated that VGAM was the "strongest team of the southeast of France, having even defeated English teams this year", and described Edouard as a 19-year-old half-back, Henri as a 24-year-old midfielder, and "E. E. Gasqueton" as a 22-year-old forward and the team's captain.

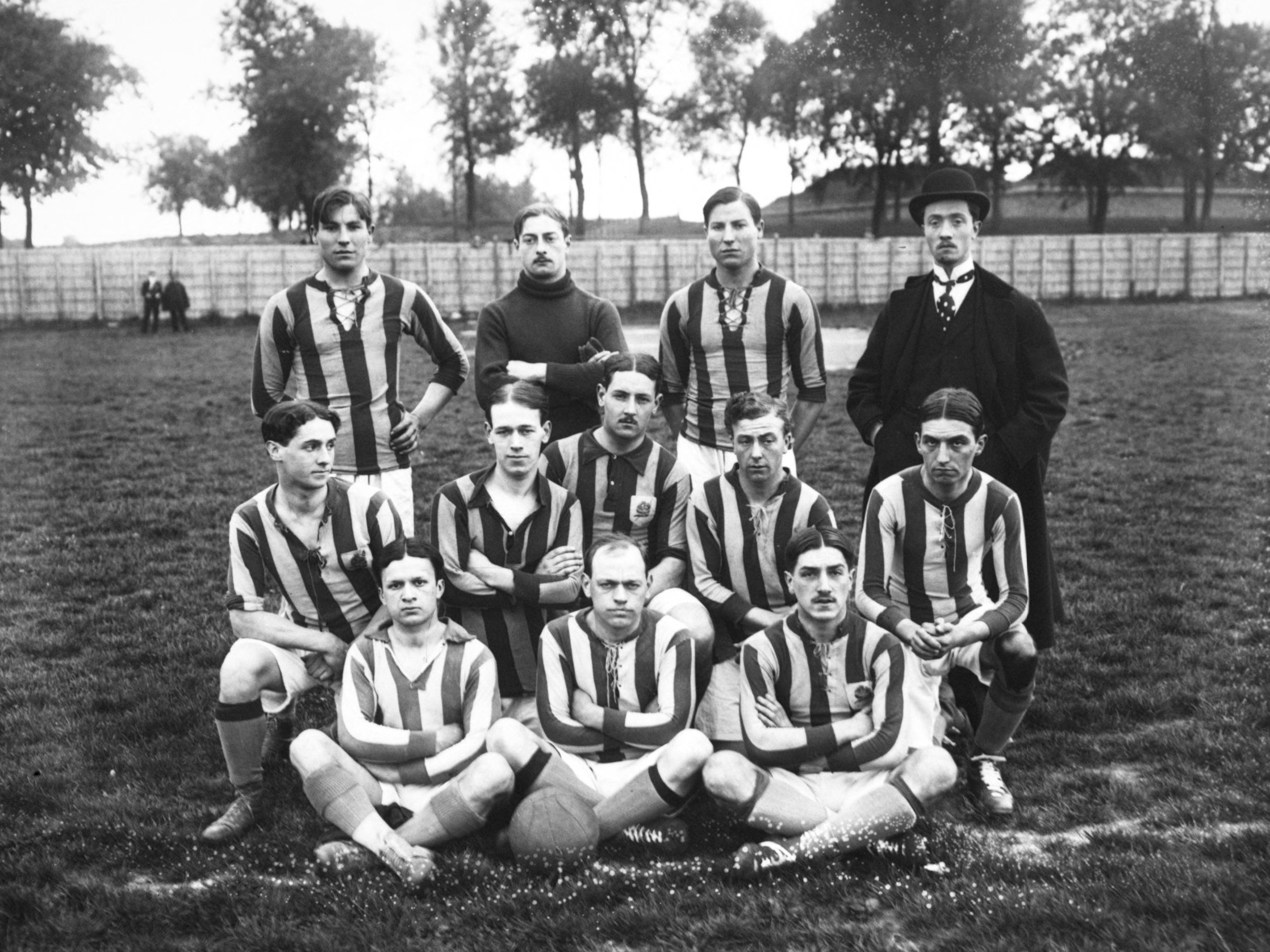
Gasqueton with the Médoc squad on 12 May 1913, ahead of its Trophée de France semifinal.

The club's football section affiliated with French Amateur Cycling Federation (FCAF), a minor federation in terms of football, which allowed Médoc to become its best team easily, comfortably winning a three-peat of FCAF championships between 1912 and 1914; in fact, the club even won the 1914 title without playing a single match. Nevertheless, these performances allowed the club to qualify for the Trophée de France, an inter-federation national competition organized by the CFI. In the 1913 edition, Edouard captained Médoc to the final on 18 May, in which he played alongside his brother Etienne (forward) in an eventual 1–2 loss to CA Paris. In the following year, on 26 April, he started in the final of the 1914 Trophée de France, which ended in a 4–1 loss to Olympique Lillois; the journalists of L'Auto (the forerunner of L'Équipe) partly blamed this loss on the fact that Médoc's forwards had to work harder due to their weak midfield, "where only one man was up to the task: it was Ed. Gasqueton".

On 7 May 1916, Edouard started in the semifinals of the 1916 Coupe de France against Olympique de Pantin, doing so alongside his brothers Henri and Lionel; Médoc lost 1–0 after extra-time.

In December 1916, his older brother Henri, as the president of VGA Médoc, was at the origin of the creation of the Ligue du Midi de Football Association (LMFA), bringing together clubs from the South-West and Languedoc. The VGA Médoc won a three-peat of LMFA championships between 1917 and 1919; in the latter final, Edouard was the captain, playing alongside his younger brother Lionel in a 2–1 win over Stade Cettois. This league was refused recognition by the USFSA, so it affiliated with Jules Rimet's LFA, which "nationalized" itself and organized its first French Championship in 1918, and Médoc reached the final against Club Français on 3 May, in which Edouard, although recently injured, started as the captain, with the local press stating that he "owed only his courage to holding his place". Additionally, his younger brother Lionel, at the front for two years, completed the eleven at the last moment, but they were able to overcome this issues, and he captained his side to a 4–3 win, thus completing a double in 1918. In the 1919 final, however, his club lost to Rimet's Red Star.

On 10 February 1918, Gasqueton, captain of the VGAM, held the position of half-left in the LFA's representative team in a friendly match against the Belgian Amateurs in Paris.

In September 1919, the VGAM moved from the Puygalan estate to the Jard estate in Mérignac, which had been recently bought by the Capbern-Gasqueton family, who worked hard to organize, without telephone, football and field hockey matches at Jard, and likewise, in the 1920s and 1930s, major national and international football matches were organized there.

On 11 April 1920, Edouard started in the semifinals of the 1919–20 Coupe de France, but despite doing so alongside his brothers Lionel and Etienne, Médoc lost 1–2 to the eventual champions CA Paris.

== Honours ==
VGA Médoc

- FCAF Football Championship:
  - Champion (3): 1912, 1913, and 1914
- Trophée de France:
  - Runner-up (2): 1913 and 1914
- Ligue du Midi de Football Association:
  - Champion (3): 1917, 1918, and 1919
- LFA National Championship:
  - Champion (1): 1917–18
