= Hôtel de Ville, Eysines =

Town hall in Eysines, France

Hôtel de Ville
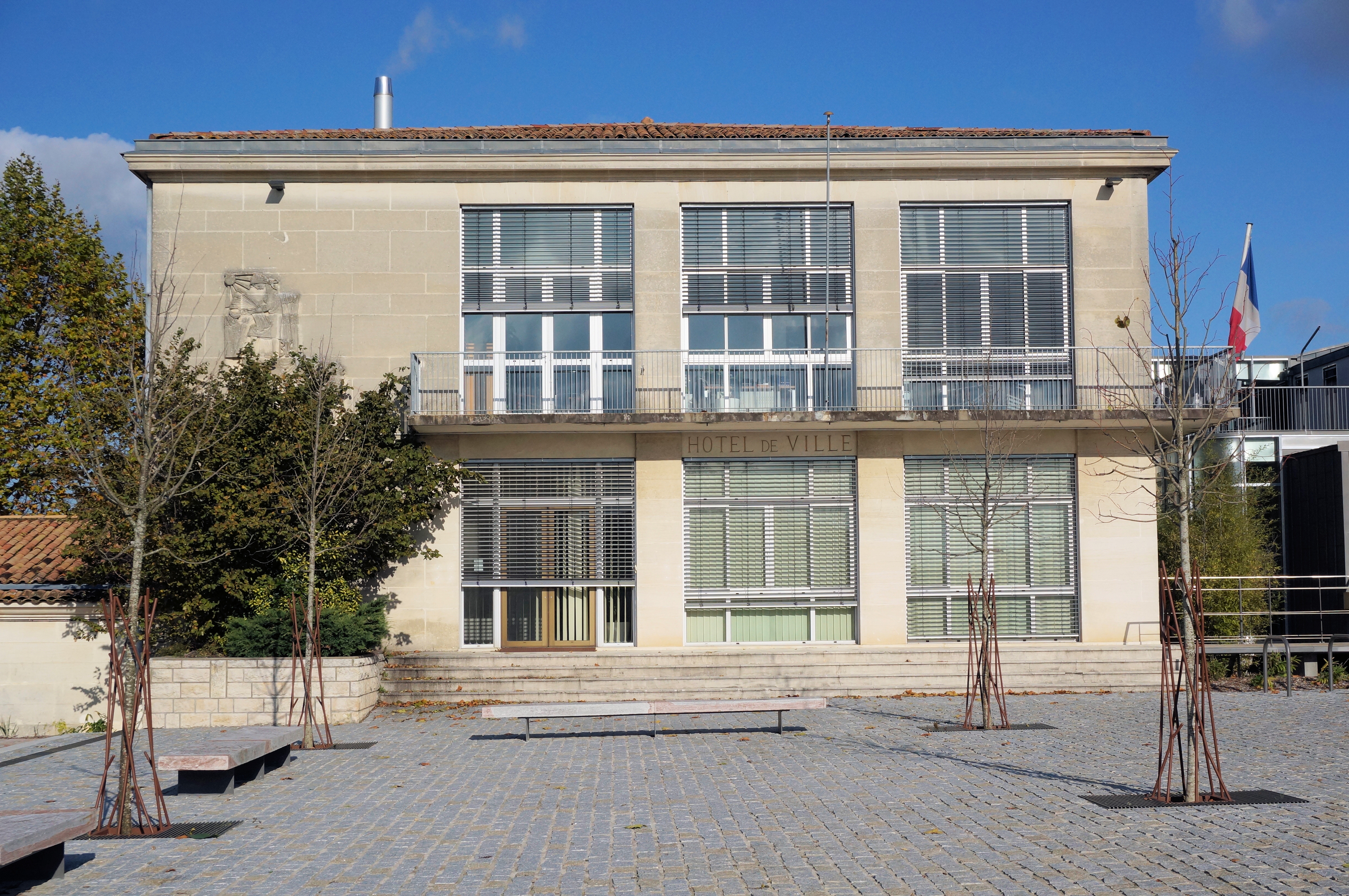
- The main frontage of the Hôtel de Ville in November 2013
- Interactive map of the Hôtel de Ville area

General information
- Type: City hall
- Architectural style: Modern style
- Location: Eysines, France
- Coordinates: 44.8858°N 0.6487°W
- Completed: 1964

Design and construction
- Architect: Louis Bauret

The Hôtel de Ville (French pronunciation: [otɛl də vil], City Hall) is a municipal building in Eysines, Gironde, in southwestern France, standing on Rue de l'Église.

== History ==
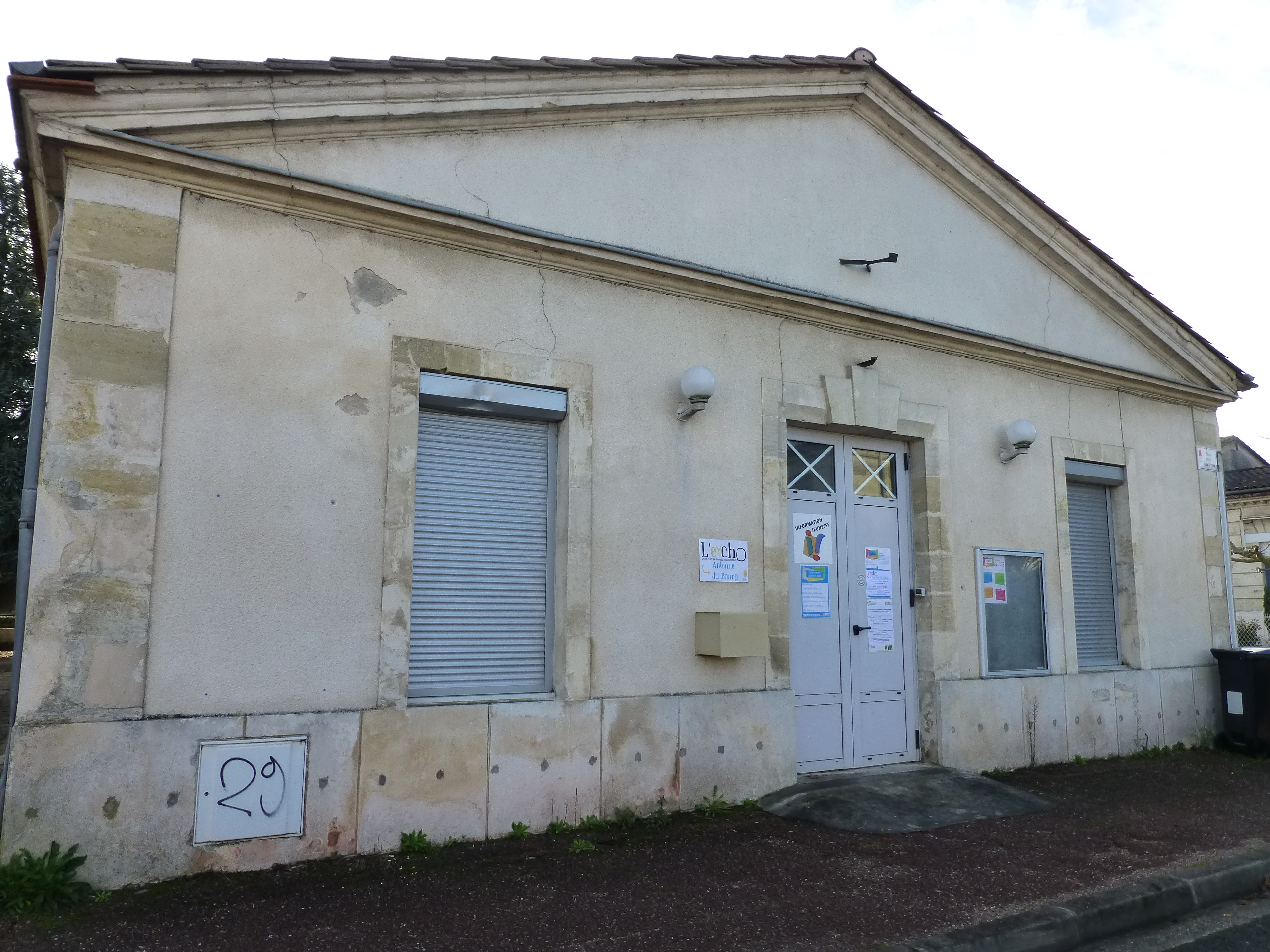
The old town hall

Following the French Revolution, the town council initially met in the home of the mayor at the time. This arrangement continued until April 1842, when the council, led by the mayor, Pierre Jeanet, decided to commission a combined town hall and school. The site they selected was on the south side of Croix du Sable (now Rue Jacques Georges Girol). The new building was designed by Sieur Pascal in the neoclassical style, built by Sieur Sabourin in rubble masonry and was completed in November 1842. The design involved a symmetrical main frontage of three bays facing onto the street with a pediment above. The central bay featured a square-headed doorway with a stone surround and a keystone, while the outer bays were fenestrated by casement windows.

In July 1960, following significant population growth, the council led by the mayor, Raoul Déjean, decided to commission a dedicated town hall. The site they selected was on the north side of Rue de l'Église. The building was designed by Louis Bauret in the modern style, built in ashlar stone and was officially opened by the mayor of Bordeaux, Jacques Chaban-Delmas, on 18 October 1964.

The design involved an asymmetrical main frontage of four bays facing onto the street. The left-hand bay was blind and was decorated, at first floor level, with a bas-relief depicting wheat. The second bay on the left featured a modern glass doorway on the ground floor and a casement window on the first floor. The other two bays were fenestrated by casement windows on both floors. Internally, the principal room was the Salle du Conseil (council chamber). The bas-relief reflected the historic importance of the local mills, which produced wheat and rye for the local economy.

In the early 21st century, the council initiated a major project to extend the town hall to the east and to the rear to accommodate additional council staff and to create additional meeting rooms. The project was carried out to a design by Pierre Goutti and Karine Louilot, was built in concrete and glass and was completed in February 2007.
