= Le Pian-Médoc =

Le Pian-Médoc Lo Pian (Occitan)
- Commune
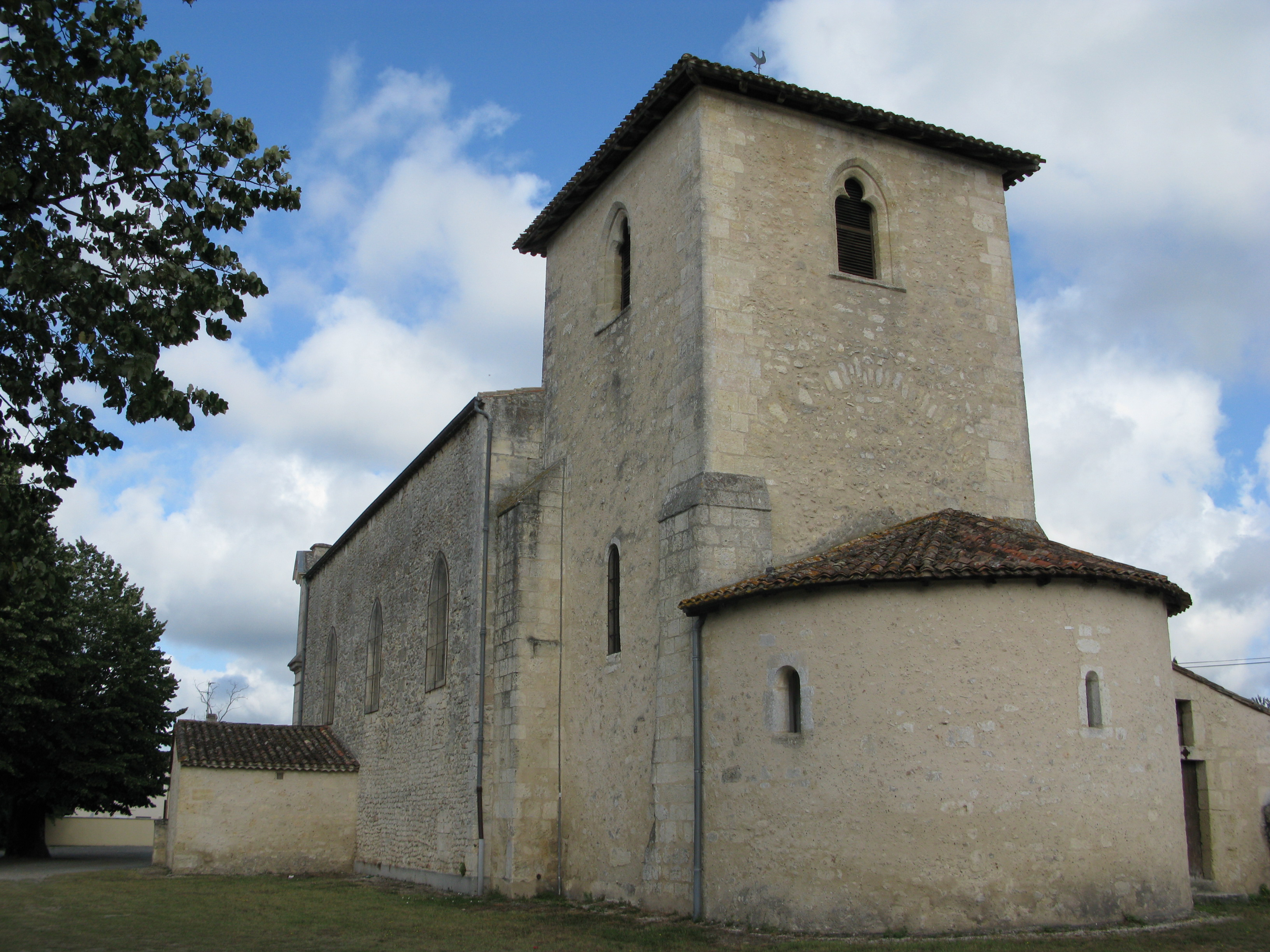
- The church in Le Pian-Médoc

- Coat of arms
- Location of Le Pian-Médoc
- Location within France Location within Nouvelle-Aquitaine
- Coordinates: 44°57′21″N 0°40′07″W
- Country: France
- Region: Nouvelle-Aquitaine
- Department: Gironde
- Arrondissement: Bordeaux
- Canton: Les Portes du Médoc
- Intercommunality: Médoc Estuaire

Government
  - Mayor (2020–2026): Didier Mau
- Area^{1}: 30.12 km^{2} (11.63 sq mi)
- Highest elevation: 37 m (121 ft)
- Lowest elevation: 5 m (16 ft)
- Population (2023): 7,292
  - Density: 242.1/km^{2} (627.0/sq mi)
- Time zone: UTC+01:00 (CET)
  - Summer (DST): UTC+02:00 (CEST)
- INSEE/Postal code: 33322 /33290
- ^{1} French Land Register data, which excludes lakes, ponds, glaciers > 1 km^{2} (0.386 sq mi or 247 acres) and river estuaries.

Le Pian-Médoc (French pronunciation: [lə pjɑ̃ medɔk]; Occitan: Lo Pian) is a commune in the Gironde department in the Nouvelle-Aquitaine region in Southwestern France. It is located northwest of Bordeaux, in the Les Portes du Médoc canton.

== Demographics ==
Historical population
Year	Pop.	±% p.a.
1968	1,144	—
1975	1,948	+7.90%
1982	3,481	+8.65%
1990	5,078	+4.83%
1999	5,373	+0.63%
2007	5,248	−0.29%
2012	6,066	+2.94%
2017	6,649	+1.85%
2023	7,292	+1.55%
Source: INSEE

== See also ==
- Communes of the Gironde department
