= Canton of Les Portes du Médoc =

Coordinates: 44.88°N 0.65°W

The canton of Les Portes du Médoc is an administrative division of the Gironde department, southwestern France. It was created at the French canton reorganisation which came into effect in March 2015. Its seat is in Eysines.

It consists of the following communes:

1. Blanquefort
2. Eysines
3. Ludon-Médoc
4. Parempuyre
5. Le Pian-Médoc
