= Ludon-Médoc =

Ludon-Médoc Ludon de Medòc (Occitan)
- Commune
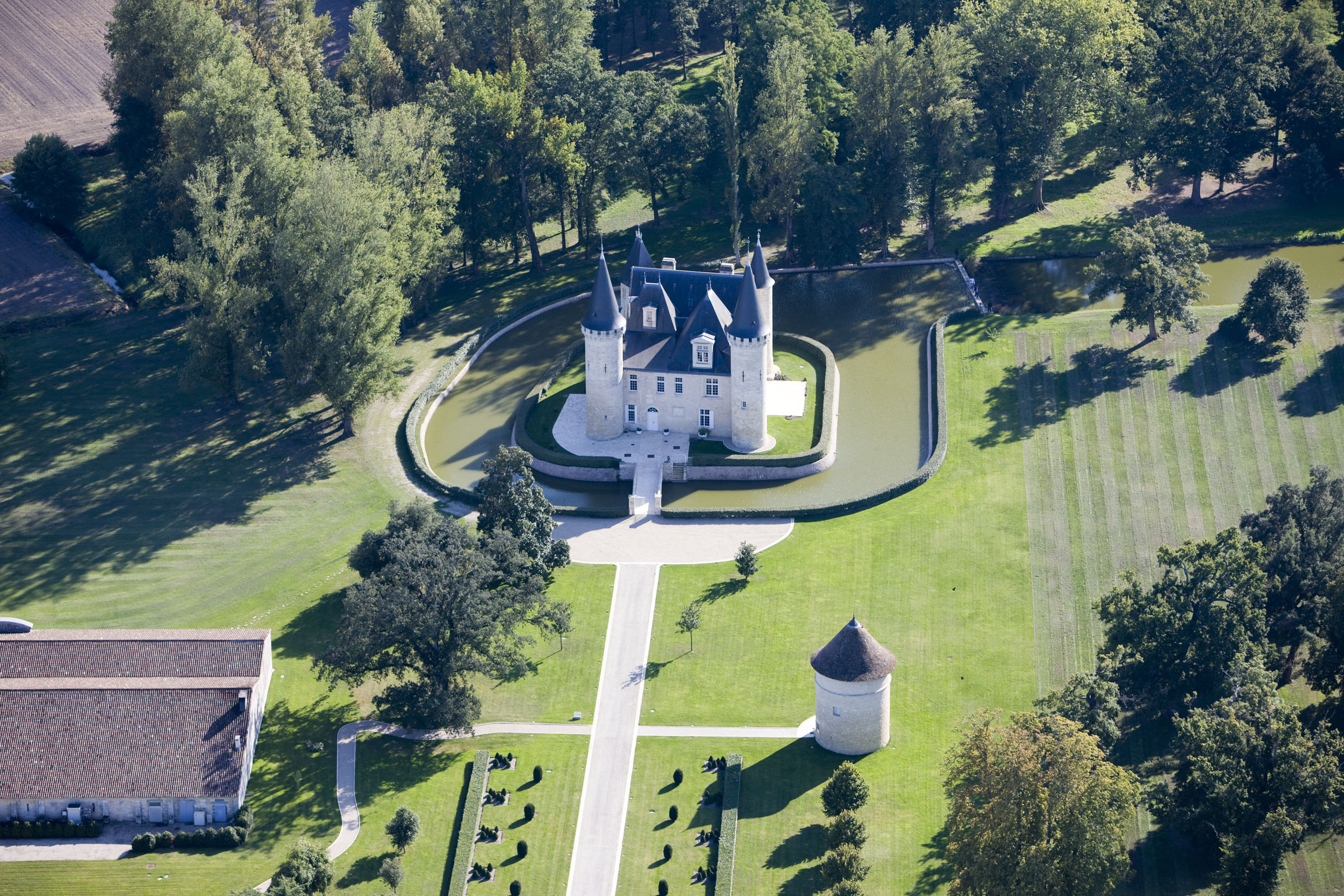
- Château d'Agassac

- Coat of arms
- Location of Ludon-Médoc
- Location within France Location within Nouvelle-Aquitaine
- Coordinates: 44°58′59″N 0°36′09″W
- Country: France
- Region: Nouvelle-Aquitaine
- Department: Gironde
- Arrondissement: Bordeaux
- Canton: Les Portes du Médoc
- Intercommunality: Médoc Estuaire

Government
  - Mayor (2020–2026): Philippe Ducamp
- Area^{1}: 18.69 km^{2} (7.22 sq mi)
- Elevation: 9 m (30 ft)
- Highest elevation: 16 m (52 ft)
- Lowest elevation: 0 m (0 ft)
- Population (2023): 5,578
  - Density: 298.4/km^{2} (773.0/sq mi)
- Time zone: UTC+01:00 (CET)
  - Summer (DST): UTC+02:00 (CEST)
- INSEE/Postal code: 33256 /33290
- ^{1} French Land Register data, which excludes lakes, ponds, glaciers > 1 km^{2} (0.386 sq mi or 247 acres) and river estuaries.

Ludon-Médoc (French pronunciation: [lydɔ̃ medɔk]; Occitan: Ludon de Medòc) is a commune in the Gironde department in the Nouvelle-Aquitaine region in Southwestern France.

== Demographics ==
Historical population
| Year | Pop. | ±% p.a. |
|---|---|---|
| 1968 | 1,504 | — |
| 1975 | 1,656 | +1.38% |
| 1982 | 2,297 | +4.79% |
| 1990 | 2,837 | +2.67% |
| 1999 | 3,327 | +1.79% |
| 2007 | 3,888 | +1.97% |
| 2012 | 4,265 | +1.87% |
| 2017 | 4,771 | +2.27% |
| 2023 | 5,578 | +2.64% |
Source: INSEE

== See also ==
- Communes of the Gironde department
