= Eysines =

- Commune
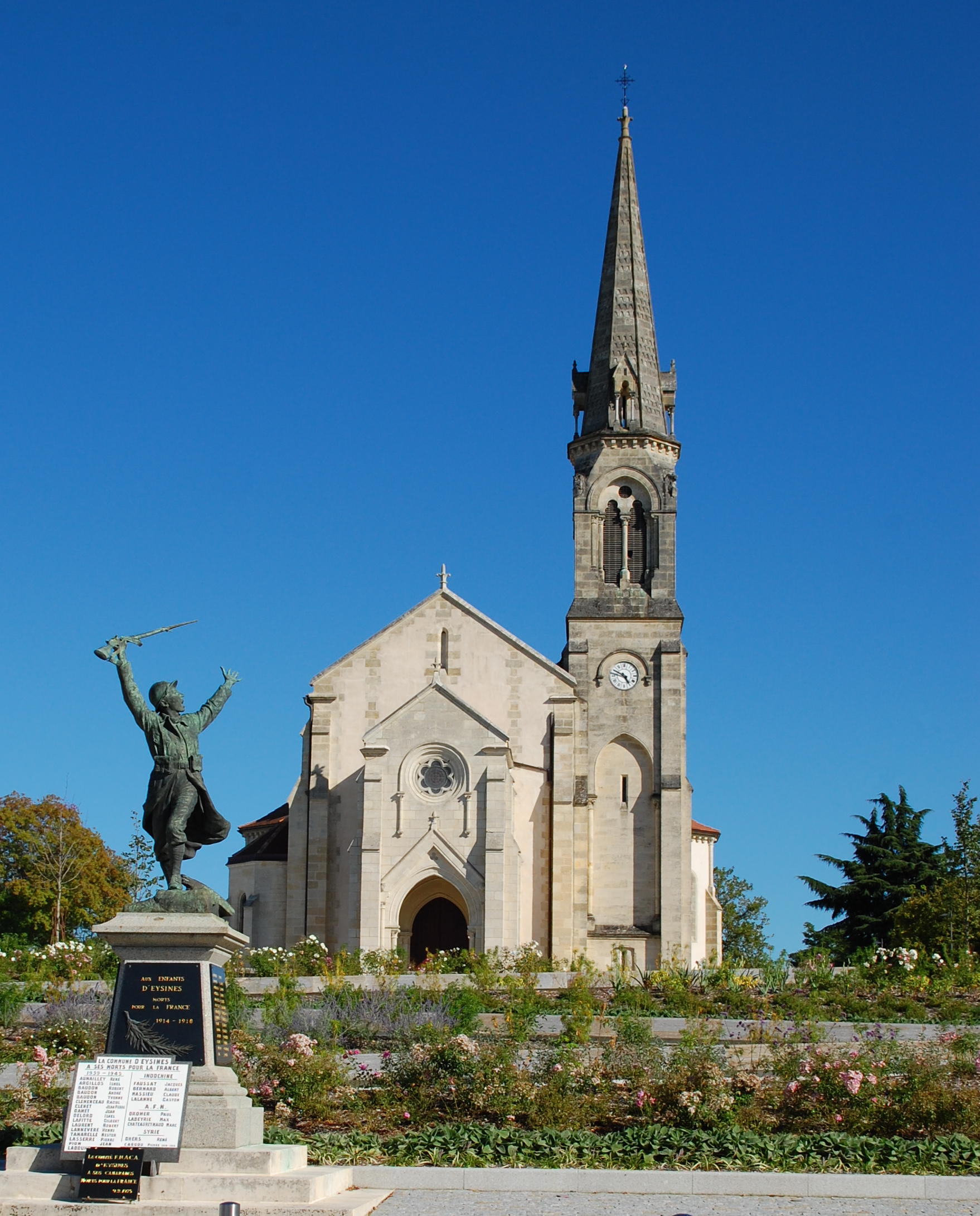
- The church in Eysines

- Coat of arms
- Location of Eysines
- Location within France Location within Nouvelle-Aquitaine
- Coordinates: 44°53′07″N 0°39′00″W
- Country: France
- Region: Nouvelle-Aquitaine
- Department: Gironde
- Arrondissement: Bordeaux
- Canton: Les Portes du Médoc
- Intercommunality: Bordeaux Métropole

Government
  - Mayor (2020–2026): Christine Bost
- Area^{1}: 12.01 km^{2} (4.64 sq mi)
- Elevation: 10 m (33 ft)
- Highest elevation: 45 m (148 ft)
- Lowest elevation: 3 m (9.8 ft)
- Population (2023): 24,825
  - Density: 2,067/km^{2} (5,354/sq mi)
- Time zone: UTC+01:00 (CET)
  - Summer (DST): UTC+02:00 (CEST)
- INSEE/Postal code: 33162 /33320
- ^{1} French Land Register data, which excludes lakes, ponds, glaciers > 1 km^{2} (0.386 sq mi or 247 acres) and river estuaries.

Eysines (French pronunciation: [ɛzin]; Occitan: Aisinas) is a commune in the Gironde department in southwestern France. It is a suburb of Bordeaux, adjacent to the northwest of the city.

== History ==
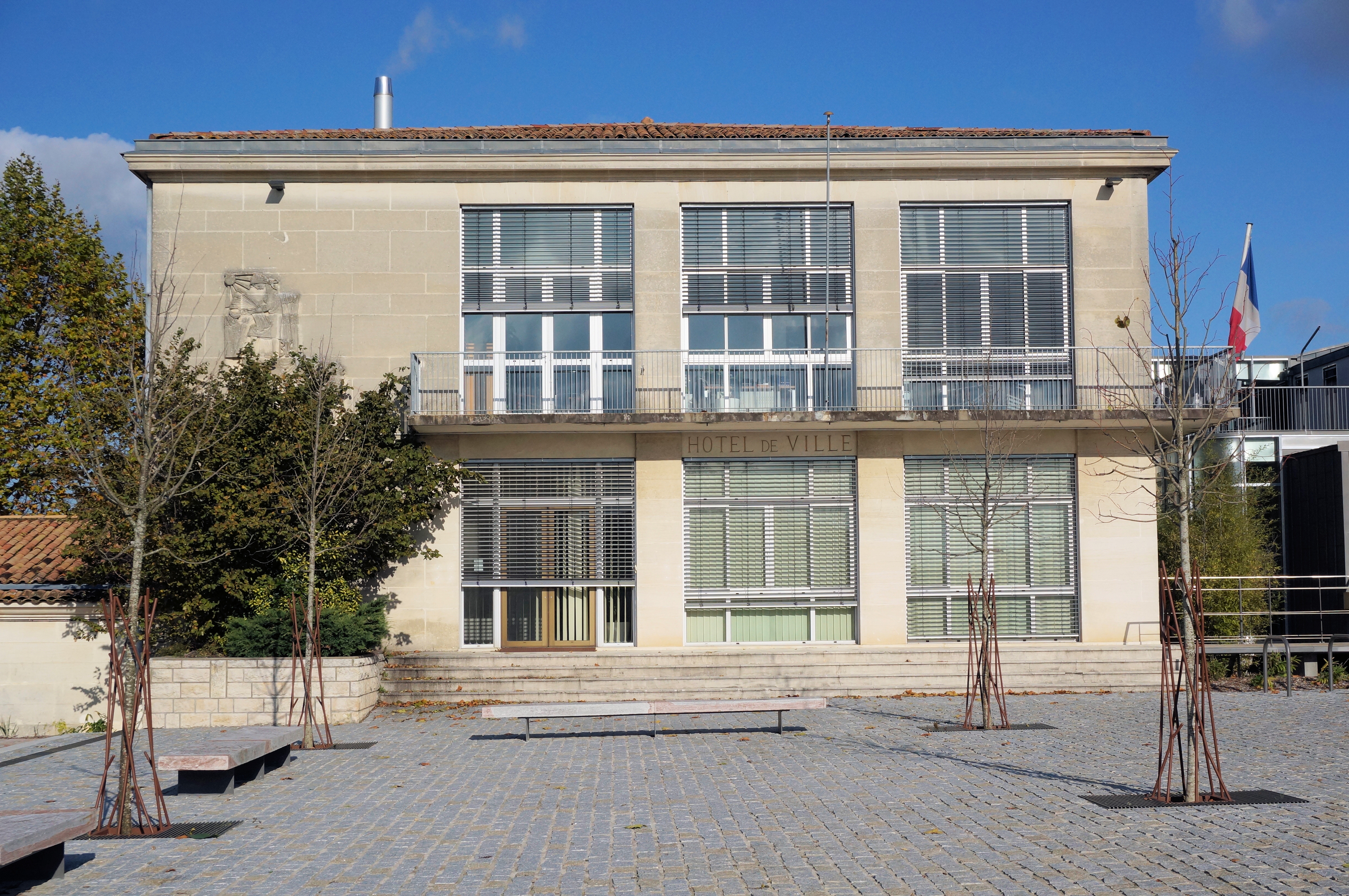
The Hôtel de Ville

The Hôtel de Ville was completed in 1964.

== Population ==
Historical population

Year	Pop.	±% p.a.
1793	1,980	—
1821	1,835	−0.27%
1846	2,575	+1.36%
1872	2,361	−0.33%
1901	2,826	+0.62%
1926	3,017	+0.26%
1946	3,280	+0.42%
1962	5,327	+3.08%
1968	8,026	+7.07%

Year	Pop.	±% p.a.
1975	12,719	+6.80%
1982	14,760	+2.15%
1990	16,391	+1.32%
1999	18,407	+1.30%
2007	19,207	+0.53%
2012	21,063	+1.86%
2017	23,462	+2.18%
2023	24,825	+0.95%

Source: EHESS and INSEE (1968-2023)

== Notable people linked to the commune ==
- Julien Courbet, born 7 February 1965, French journalist, television presenter and producer
- Jean-Claude Lalumière, novelist
- Lucenzo, French-Portuguese singer and record producer
- Pierre Duret de la Plane (1728-1811), agronomist and benefactor

== See also ==
- Communes of the Gironde department
