= Saint-Estèphe, Gironde =

Saint-Estèphe
- Commune
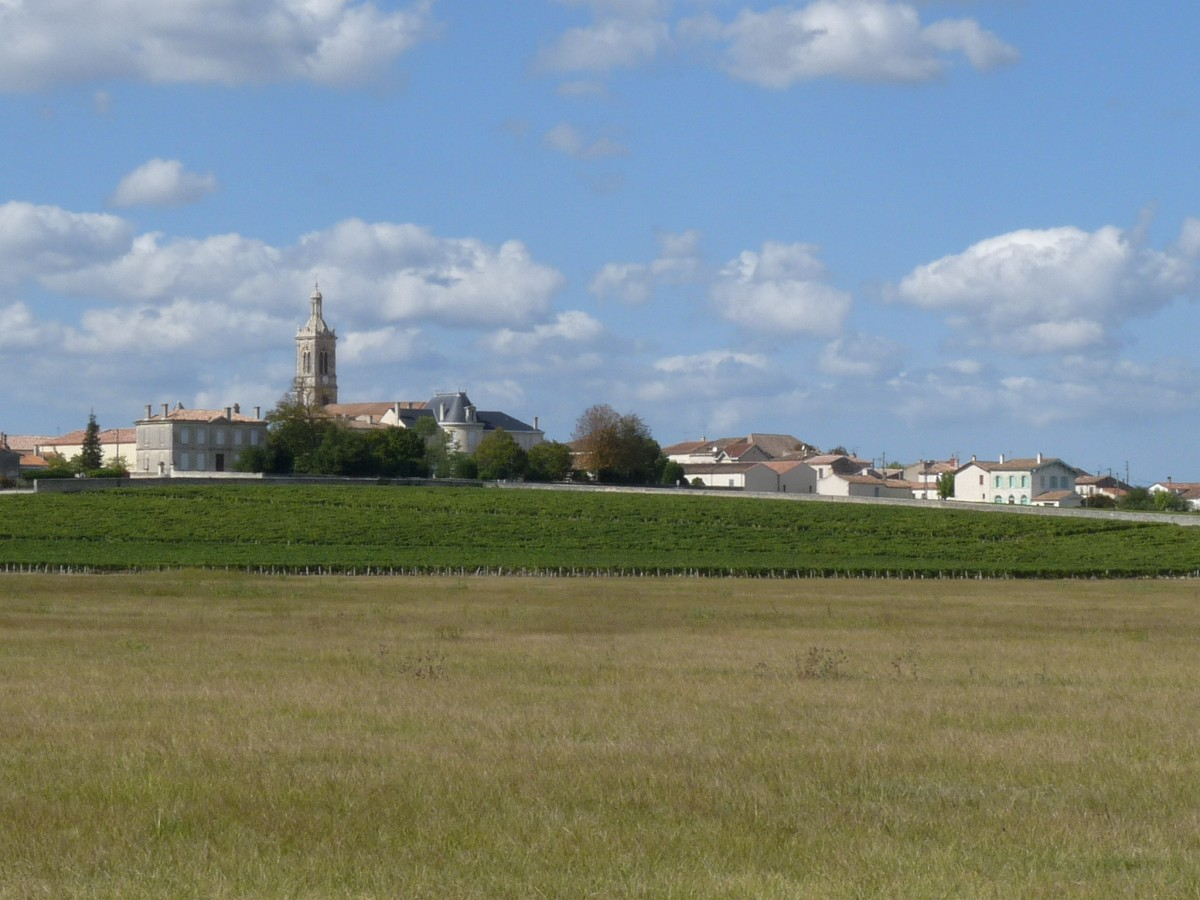
- A general view of Saint-Estèphe

- Coat of arms
- Location of Saint-Estèphe
- Location within France Location within Nouvelle-Aquitaine
- Coordinates: 45°15′55″N 0°46′15″W
- Country: France
- Region: Nouvelle-Aquitaine
- Department: Gironde
- Arrondissement: Lesparre-Médoc
- Canton: Le Nord-Médoc

Government
  - Mayor (2020–2026): Michelle Saintout
- Area^{1}: 23.54 km^{2} (9.09 sq mi)
- Elevation: 13 m (43 ft)
- Highest elevation: 31 m (102 ft)
- Lowest elevation: 0 m (0 ft)
- Population (2023): 1,638
  - Density: 69.58/km^{2} (180.2/sq mi)
- Time zone: UTC+01:00 (CET)
  - Summer (DST): UTC+02:00 (CEST)
- INSEE/Postal code: 33395 /33180
- ^{1} French Land Register data, which excludes lakes, ponds, glaciers > 1 km^{2} (0.386 sq mi or 247 acres) and river estuaries.

Saint-Estèphe (French pronunciation: [sɛ̃.t‿ɛstɛf]; Gascon: Sent Estèfe) is a commune in the Gironde department in Nouvelle-Aquitaine in southwestern France.

== Geography ==
The village lies 60 km (37 mi) northwest of Bordeaux.

== Population ==
Historical population
Year	Pop.	±% p.a.
1968	2,171	—
1975	2,317	+0.93%
1982	2,118	−1.27%
1990	1,918	−1.23%
1999	1,799	−0.71%
2007	1,698	−0.72%
2012	1,650	−0.57%
2017	1,615	−0.43%
2023	1,638	+0.24%
Source: INSEE

== Wine ==
Saint-Estèphe is best known as the northernmost, and one of the four major wine-growing appellations of the Médoc. The area is separated from Château Lafite-Rothschild in Pauillac to the south by the Jalle de Breuil stream and its vineyards cover around 12 km^{2} (4.6 sq mi) on the banks of the Gironde estuary. The grounds of St.-Estèphe are varied centered in Château Phélan-Ségur. To the south-east corner of the appellation area, they are similar to those of Pauillac, with deep gravels lying on a hard sandstone base. Progressively to the west and north, they get more clayey, less gravelly, and become heavier. In parts, veins of alios (a reduced form of iron) can be found. The layers of gravel on top of clay lead to comparatively poor drainage, and the harvest is one of the latest of the whole region, although this water retention can be of use in vintages of low rainfall.

== See also ==
- French wine
- Bordeaux Wine
- Bordeaux wine regions
- Communes of the Gironde department
