= Château Calon-Ségur =

Winery in the Bordeaux wine region of France

Coordinates: 45.26697°N 0.77769°W

Château Calon-Ségur is a winery in the Saint-Estèphe appellation of the Bordeaux wine region of France. The wine produced here was classified as one of fourteen Troisièmes Crus Classés (Third Growths) in the historic Bordeaux Wine Official Classification of 1855. It is the northernmost classified growth in the Médoc.

== History ==
"Calon", meaning a little river skiff used in the Middle Ages to ferry timber across the Gironde estuary, gave the name to this district which was at one point known as Calones or Saint-Estèphe-de-Calon. In early times, Château Calon-Ségur was one of the original three vineyards in Saint-Estèphe and, in 1825, Château Montrose (in 1855 classified as a Second Growth) was a forest-land parcel belonging to the Calon-Ségur estate.

By marriage, the estate came to be owned by Nicolas-Alexandre, marquis de Ségur who also owned Chateau Latour and Chateau Lafite. Despite his ownership of these two First Growths, the Marquis said that "I make wine at Lafite and Latour but my heart is at Calon Segur." The wine's label today includes a drawing of a heart around the Chateau's name.

In the modern era, the estate has been owned by the Capbern Gasqueton family since 1894. After Mme Capbern-Gasqueton's death, it was sold in 2012 to Suravenir Assurances, an insurance company.

Chinese winemaker Emma Gao trained at the chateau, where she met her future husband, winemaker Thierry Courtade.
