= Northern France football team =

Association football team of Paris, France

Northern France
- Confederation: None
- Head coach: Fernand Desrousseaux
- Captain: Jean Ducret
- Home stadium: Parc des Princes; Stade Jean-Bouin

The Northern France football team (French: Équipe du Nord de football), nicknamed Lions of Flanders, is a regional football scratch team representing the Northern Committee of the Union des Sociétés Françaises de Sports Athlétiques (USFSA) between 1906 and 1919, and then the Northern Football League from 1919 onwards.

The Paris football team plays one-off games against clubs, regional teams, or collectives of other confederations, and as such, no governing body in the sport officially recognizes the team. The selection was especially important before the 1940s, serving as a springboard for possible selection in the French national team.

== History ==
=== From creation to Roubaix ===
As early as 1906, André Billy, the newly-elected president of USFSA, organized meetings between the football teams of Paris and Northern France, which was made up of a selection of the best players from the Northern Committee of the USFSA. During the presidency of Robert Guérin, the French team was largely made up of only Parisians, with two exceptions, but under Billy, the Northerners made their entrance in large scale, and they were keen to win the so-called "Paris-Nord" meetings to confirm the domination of the Northern clubs, thus becoming a sort of annual selection match for the French team. In the 1907 Paris-Nord match, Georges Bon scored a goal to help the Northerners win 4–1, and this earned him his first (and only) cap for France in a friendly match against Belgium at Uccle on 21 April 1907, in which he contributed to France's winning goal (2–1). Both sides selected players who belonged to regional elite clubs, and who benefited from training conditions and remuneration that allowed them to honor the selections.

In 1910, the USFSA invited its regional committees to increase the number of such matches, for the purposes of sporting emulation. In the following year, the USFSA's selection of Northern France participated in the 1911 UIAFA European Football Tournament at Roubaix, an unofficial European Championship organized by UIAFA, entering as a last-minute replacement for Switzerland, which had withdrawn, and being set to face England AFA in the semifinals on 25 May. In the build-up for the tournament, Northern France defeated two English clubs, Old Malvernians (3–1) and Lyford FC (1–0), the latter under the name Roubaix XI, but despite these victories, the French press never believed in their chances, with the French newspaper L'Auto prophesying that "the fight is therefore expected to be tough, but, despite all their value, the Northerners will have to bow to the fine AFA team", and indeed, the Northerners equalized at the restart of the second half to make it 1–1, but the English centre-forward scored the winning goal at the very end of the game.

=== Lions des Flandres ===
In 1912, Henri Jooris took the initiative of creating a northern selection in order to organize inter-regional meetings that would serve as a springboard for possible selection to the French team. It was nicknamed Lions des Flandres in honor of the French Flanders, and the most prestigious matches of this selection consisted of an annual opposition with the Parisian selection. This selection was made up of the best players who played in the clubs from the departments of Northern France, such as Somme and Pas-de-Calais, with the players mainly coming from the three flagship clubs of the Lille metropolis: Racing Club de Roubaix, US Tourquennoise, and Olympique Lillois. Even though Amiens SC was part of the USFSA Football Championship, some of its players were also selected for the Lions of Flanders from creation. Other clubs included the SC Fives, the Excelsior AC, Valenciennes FC, and the US Malo-les-Bains.

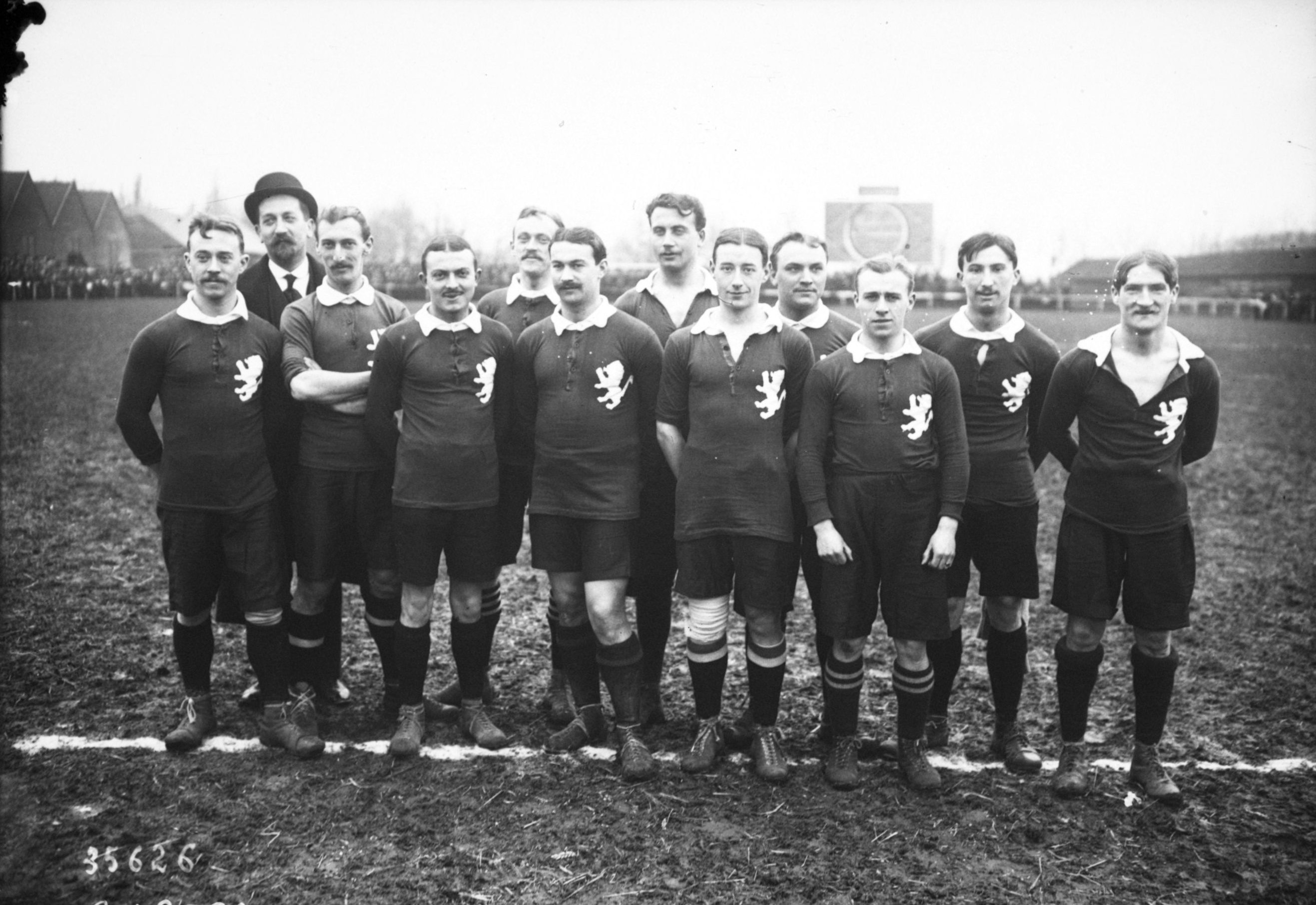
Lions of Flanders selection of 4 January 1914. From left to right: Charles Dujardin, Fernand Desrousseaux (coach), Henri Moigneu, Henri Lesur, Gabriel Hanot, Albert Eloy, Alphonse Six, Paul Chandelier, Maurice Gravelines, Raymond Dubly, Albert Parsys, Jean Ducret (captain).

Between 1912 and 1914, the team was presided by Jooris, coached by Fernand Desrousseaux, and captained by Jean Ducret. On All Saints' Day of 1913, two matches were organized at the same time by the main rival organizations, with the USFSA selection facing the amateurs' team of English Wanderers in Auteuil, while the LFA's selection of Paris faced the London League in Saint-Ouen, and this choice proves the acuteness of the rivalry between the federations. The English Wanderers was made up of several players who had played international matches for England amateur, some of which at the Olympic Games of 1908 and 1912, such as Albert Henry Bell, Frederick Chapman, and Henry Littlewort, and thus, the USFSA team logically lost 1–4, and on the following day, the English Wanderers defeated a Le Havre selection by a score of 5–0. Two months later, on 4 January 1914, the Lions des Flandres gained national recognition after its 3–0 victory against the LFA's Paris selection in Lille, thanks to goals from Henri Lesur, Alphonse Six, and Raymond Dubly. In the build-up for a match against Belgium on 25 January 1914, France played a warm-up game against a selection of the foreigner players in Paris, which included both 7 "Liguists" (LFA) and 4 "Unionists" (USFSA), being made-up of 6 Swiss, 3 British, 1 Hungarian, and a Franco-Italian; it ended in a goalless draw.

Thanks to the results of the Lions of Flanders and Olympique Lillois in the early 1910s, it can reasonably be said that northern football was the best in France, but then the First World War broke out, in which Northern France was occupied for 4 years, thus interrupting the activities of the team and causing the death of many of its players. After the War, on 11 May 1919, the Lions des Flandres faced the LFA's Paris selection again, this time at the Stade de Paris in Saint-Ouen, ending in a 4–4 draw.

=== Under the FFF ===
On 19 August 1919, the Northern Football Association League (LNFA) was founded by twenty clubs, which began competing in the Northern Football League. On 22 May 1921, "the Lions" faced the prestigious Celtic, which was the first visit of a professional football team to Northern France, which was held at the Jean Dubrulle Stadium in Roubaix in front of 10,000 spectators, with Celtic winning 3–0. The newspaper l'Echo du Nord stated that this meeting between Scottish professionals and northern amateurs would be "a landmark in the annals of northern sport".

The results of the Lions of Flanders, which had been mixed for a long time, improved significantly from 1927. Thus, it afforded itself the luxury of beating Rapid Wien, winner of the 1930 Mitropa Cup. In the 1930s, the Lions of Flanders played against the South-East selection in Montpellier and the amateur Hungarian team in Tourcoing.

As part of the UEFA Regions' Cup, a Nord-Pas-de-Calais selection was created in 1999, in which players must be 19 years old and have never signed a professional, trainee, aspirant, or federal contract. In 2017, the Nord-Pas-de-Calais selection merged with that of Picardy to form the Hauts-de-France selection.

== Results ==
=== USFSA ===
1907 Friendly	Northern France	4–1	Select Paris	France
	Bon ?	Report	?

1908 Friendly	Northern France	?	Select Paris	France
		Report

27 December 1908 Friendly	Select Nord France	4–3	(England) Townley Park FC	Lille, France
		Report

1909 Friendly	Northern France	?	Select Paris	France
		Report

1910 Friendly	Northern France	?	Select Paris	France
		Report

March 1911 Friendly	Northern France	3–1	Select Paris	Lille, France
	?	Report	Camard
Note: Georges Bon provided two assists.

7 May 1911 Friendly	Northern France (USFSA)	3–1	(England) Old Malvernians	Roubaix, France
		Report1; Report2		Stadium: Stadium de l'Exposition de Roubaix; Attendance: 10,000
Note: On the occasion of the inauguration of the Stade de l'Exposition de Roubaix.

14 May 1911 Friendly	Roubaix XI	1–0	(England) Lyford FC	Roubaix, France
		Report1; Report2		Stadium: Stadium de l'Exposition de Roubaix; Attendance: 1,000

25 May 1911 1911 UIAFA European Football Tournament	Northern France (USFSA)	1 – 2	England AFA	Roubaix, France
17:00	? 85'	Report	?	Stadium: Stadium de l'Exposition de Roubaix; Attendance: 4,000; Referee: Gardner (England)

1912 Friendly	Northern France	?	Select Paris	France
		Report

=== Lions des Flandres ===
1 November 1913 Friendly	Lions of Flanders	1–4	(England) English Wanderers	Paris, France
	Séraphin 1–3' Loubière; Bonnet, Degouve; Montagne, Loir, Rémy; Trousselier, Brouzes, Félizard, Schalbart, Séraphin	Report1 (page 38-42) Report2	Russell 15'; Bonnet 0–2', o.g.' Veitch 0–3'; Draper 1–4' Lemoine; Gaskell, Bell; Crane, Grey, Olley; Draper (capt.), Veitch, Kent, Fitchie, Russell	Attendance: 1,000; Referee: M. Chapman

December 1913 Friendly	Northern France	3–8	Select Paris	Lille, France
		Report

4 January 1914 Friendly	Lions des Flandres	3–0	Select Paris	Lille, France
14:34	Lesur 34'; Six 72'; Dubly 78' Parsys; Moigneu (capt.), Hanot; Dujardin, Ducret, Gravelines; Dubly, Chandelier, Lesur, Six, Eloy	Report	Chayriguès; Gravier, Pellan; Devic, Gamblin, Barreau; Romano, Rouchès, Maës, Morel, Triboulet	Referee: M. Tromp (Netherlands)

18 January 1914 Friendly	France	0–0	Foreigners of Paris	Paris, France
		Report (page 45)	Germann; Zullig, Romano; Jordan, Eggenschwyler, Steiner; Niggli, Matthey, Surwick, Solka, Burgin	Stadium: Saint-Michel Legion Stadium

12 May 1919 Friendly	Select Paris	4–4	Lions des Flandres	Saint-Ouen, France
		Report		Stadium: Stade de Paris

5 April 1920 Tournoi de Roubaix	Select Roubaix	3–4	(England) London Select	Saint-Ouen, France
		Report		Stadium: Stade de Paris

22 May 1921 Friendly	Lions of Flanders	0–3	(Scotland) Celtic	Roubaix, France
		Report		Stadium: Jean Dubrulle Stadium; Attendance: 10,000

=== Northern League ===
2 May 1926 Friendly	Northern France	3–2	(England) University of Kent	Tourcoing, France
		Report

22 April 1934 Friendly	Northern France	2–3	(England) Sunderland	Lille, France
		Report

27 May 1934 Friendly	Northern France	4–2	(Scotland) Celtic	Lille, France
		Report

31 March 1935 Friendly	Northern France	1–1	(Scotland) Clyde	Lille, France
		Report

1 December 1935 Friendly	Northern France	3–2	(England) Sheffield Wednesday	Lille, France
		Report

15 November 1936 Friendly	Northern France	5–1	(England) Sunderland	Lille, France
		Report

== Notable players ==
- Alphonse Six
- Raymond Dubly
- Jean Ducret
- Gabriel Hanot

== Bibliography ==
- Chovaux, Olivier (2001). Cinquante ans de football dans le Pas-de-Calais. "Le temps de l'enracinement" (Fin XIXe-1940) [Fifty years of football in Pas-de-Calais. "The time of rooting" (End of the 19th century-1940)] (in French). Artois Presse Université. ISBN 9782378153427.
