= Henri Moigneu =

French footballer

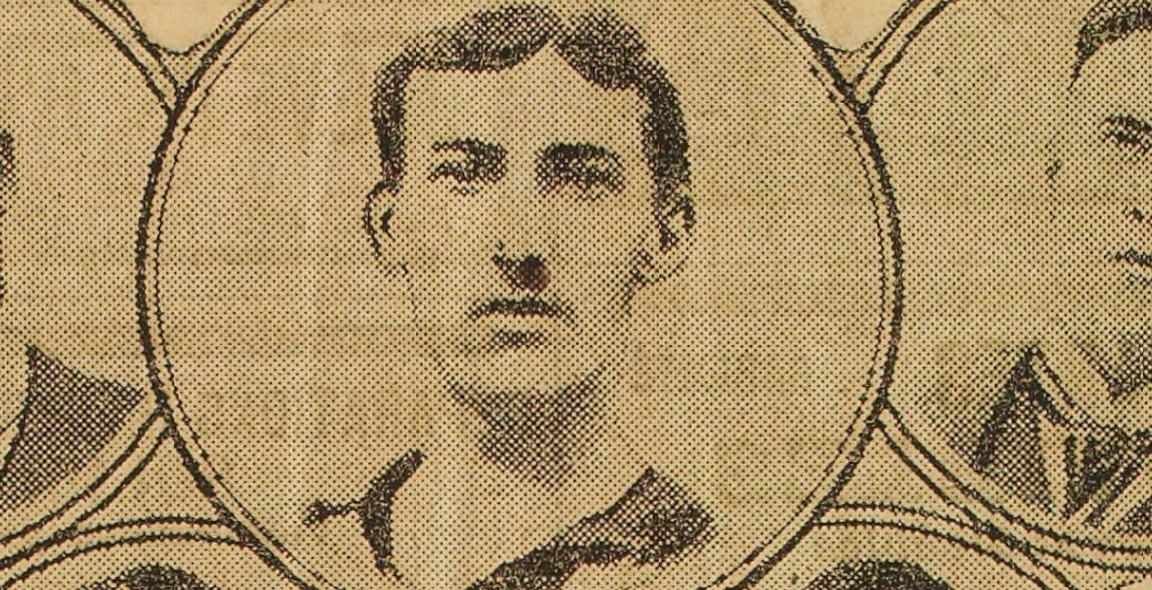
- Moigneu in 1907

Personal information
- Full name: Henri Camille Moigneu
- Date of birth: 9 March 1887
- Place of birth: Morsain, France
- Date of death: 14 March 1937 (aged 50)
- Place of death: Savigny-sur-Orge, France
- Height: 1.90 m (6 ft 3 in)
- Position: Defender

Youth career
- Lycée de Tourcoing

Senior career*
Years	Team	Apps	(Gls)
1902–1904	Lycée de Tourcoing		
1904–1914	US Tourquennoise		

International career
1905–1908	France	8	(0)
1905–1914	Northern France	+4	(0)
1911	France (UIAFA)	0	(0)
- * Club domestic league appearances and goals

Henri Camille Moigneu (9 March 1887 – 14 March 1937) was a French footballer who played as a defender for US Tourquennoise and the French national team between 1904 and 1914.

== Early life ==
Henri Moigneu was born in Morsain, Hauts-de-France, on 9 March 1887, (Note: Some sources wrongly state that he was born on 9 August 1987.) and just like his fellow future internationals Adrien Filez, Jules Dubly, and Gabriel Hanot, Moigneu was introduced to football at the Lycée de Tourcoing by an English teacher, Achille Beltette (1864–1932), who had founded the US Tourquennoise (UST) in May 1898.

== Playing career ==
=== Club career ===
In 1904, the 17-year-old Moigneu was a French school champion with the Lycée de Tourcoing, so he then joined UST, where he quickly established himself as the team captain in 1905, aged 18. He was 1.90 meters tall, (Note: Some sources wrongly state that he was 1.71 meters tall.) way above the average of the time, and despite being slender and lacking power, he compensated that with a technical quality superior to most fullbacks of his time, who were content to clear the ball anywhere, including to the stands, while Moigneu tried to keep it in the field of play, being often praised by his way of distributing the game to his attackers. He was thus often described as "scientific", a fashionable expression at the time to describe a technical player who favors precise passing. In 1906, the 19-year-old Moigneu was already described as "the best full-back you could put in a team".

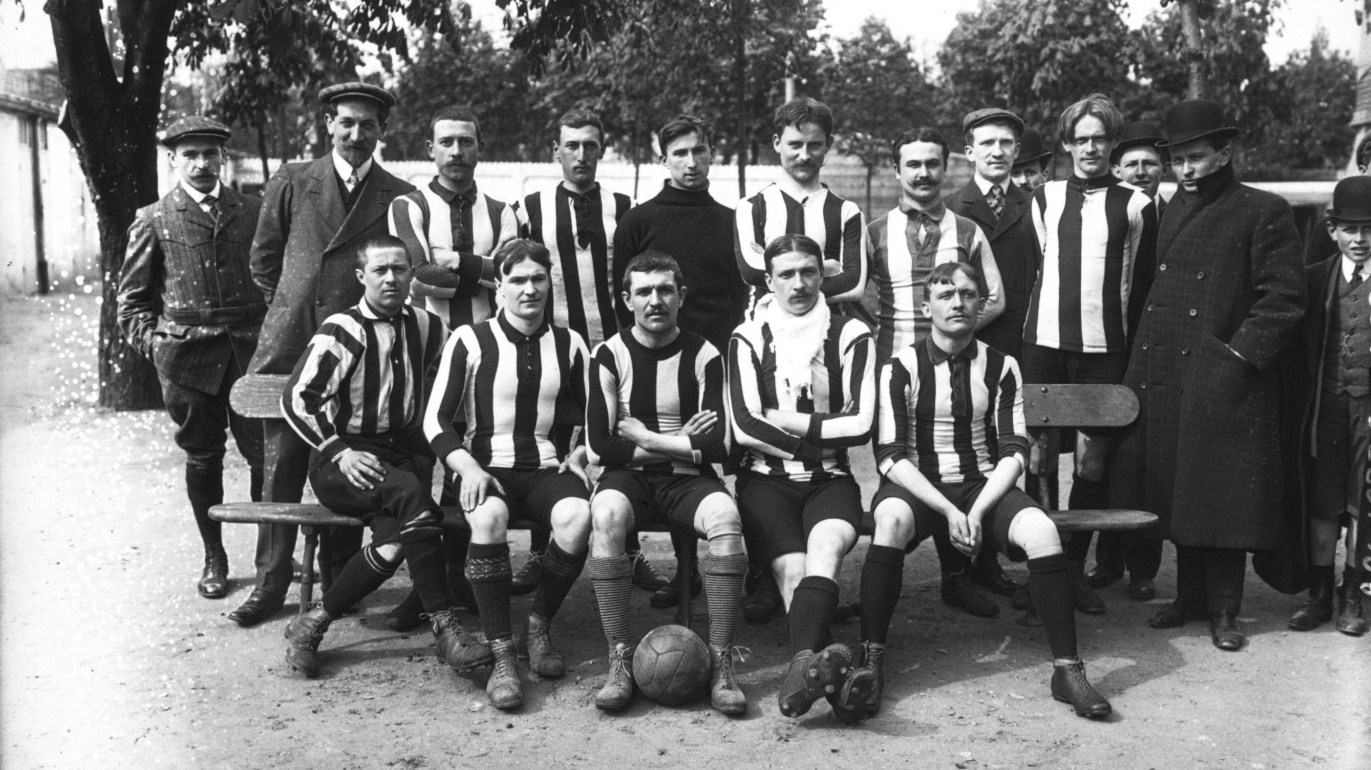
Moigneu (standing, second from left) with the US Tourquennoise team before the final of the 1910 USFSA French championship.

Together with Dubly, Hanot, and Albert Parsys, Moigneu was a member of the UST team that won back-to-back USFSA Northern Championships in 1909 and 1910, thus qualifying the club to the USFSA French Championship, where he started in the final of the 1910 edition on 1 May at the Parc des Princes, in which he assisted once to help his side to a 7–2 win over SH de Marseille, a club made up of Swiss and English immigrants. In the following year, on 29 April 1911, he started in the final of the Challenge International du Nord in Tourcoing, helping his side to a 2–1 victory over the English club Cambridge Town.

On one occasion, in 1912, the local press stated that "Moigneu single-handedly does the work of 3 ordinary class halves; he is a distributor of play of the quality of Ducret, knowing how to serve his unmarked forward". In 1913, he started in the final of the 1913 USFSA Northern Championship, which ended in a 2–0 loss to Olympique Lillois.

=== International career ===
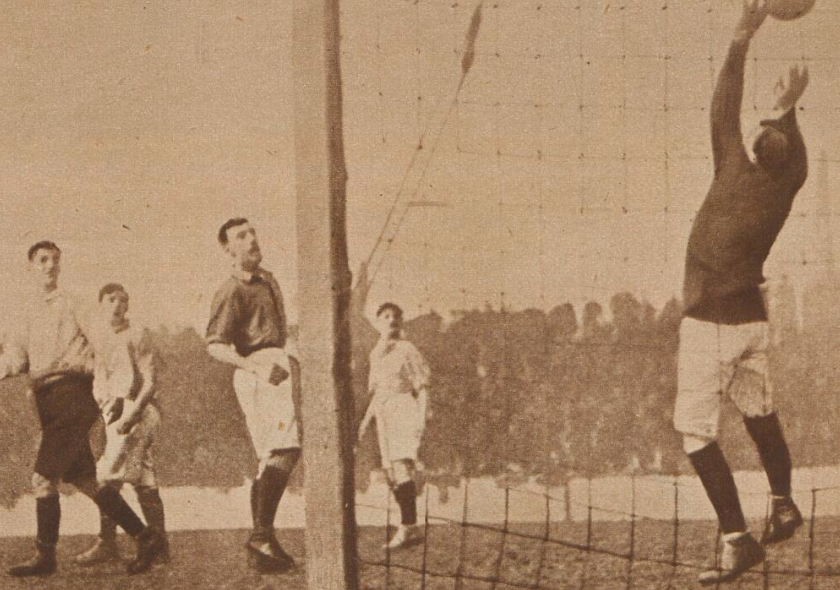
Moigneu (center) in front of the goalkeeper Renaux in a match against England London, which France lost 12–0.

On 2 April 1905, the 18-year-old Moigneu was selected by the USFSA to play for the Northern France football team in the very first Paris-Nord match, which served as a sort of annual test match for the French national team, which ended in a 4–1 loss. Two years later, on 9 May, he started in another Paris-Nord match, being involved in one of his side's goal in an eventual 3–1 win. After the Paris-Nord match of 1908, the English referee Albert Collier stated that "Moigneu, at the moment, is the best full-back I know".

Despite losing the 1905 match, Moigneu performed well enough to earn his first international cap in the following month, on 7 May 1905, making his debut against Belgium at Brussels, which ended in a 0–7 loss. In his first three matches with France, the team conceded an average of 9 goals per game, but despite this, the Belgian manager Louis Muhlinghaus, one of the founders of FIFA, ironically stated that "the French defense, except for Moigneu, hardly defends you". He played a further five matches for a total of eight caps, the last of which coming on 10 May 1908, against the Netherlands, which ended in a 1–4 loss. Five months later, in October 1908, the USFSA selected him for the French squad that was going to compete in the football tournament of the 1908 Olympic Games in London, but Moigneu was unavailable due to military service.

Between April 1905 and October 1907, he was a member of every French selection, either national or regional, and during the USFSA period of the French national (1904–08), Moigneu was the only player to have 8 consecutive selections in a row (7 for Pierre Allemane and Marius Royet), which proves that he had known how to make himself indispensable, probably due to his versatility, because he played as a full-back (alongside Fernand Canelle three times), flying back, and even wing-half. In a certain way, however, his versatility served Moigneu badly, since he had all the qualities to be a center-half, but never had the opportunity to play in this position in the French team. And in fact, in 1922, the French newspaper Le Miroir des sports published an article that listed the best players of the past position by position, and stated that "Moigneu's love of his club never allowed him to specialize in one single position, such as center-half, where he would undoubtedly have shone with a lively brilliance".

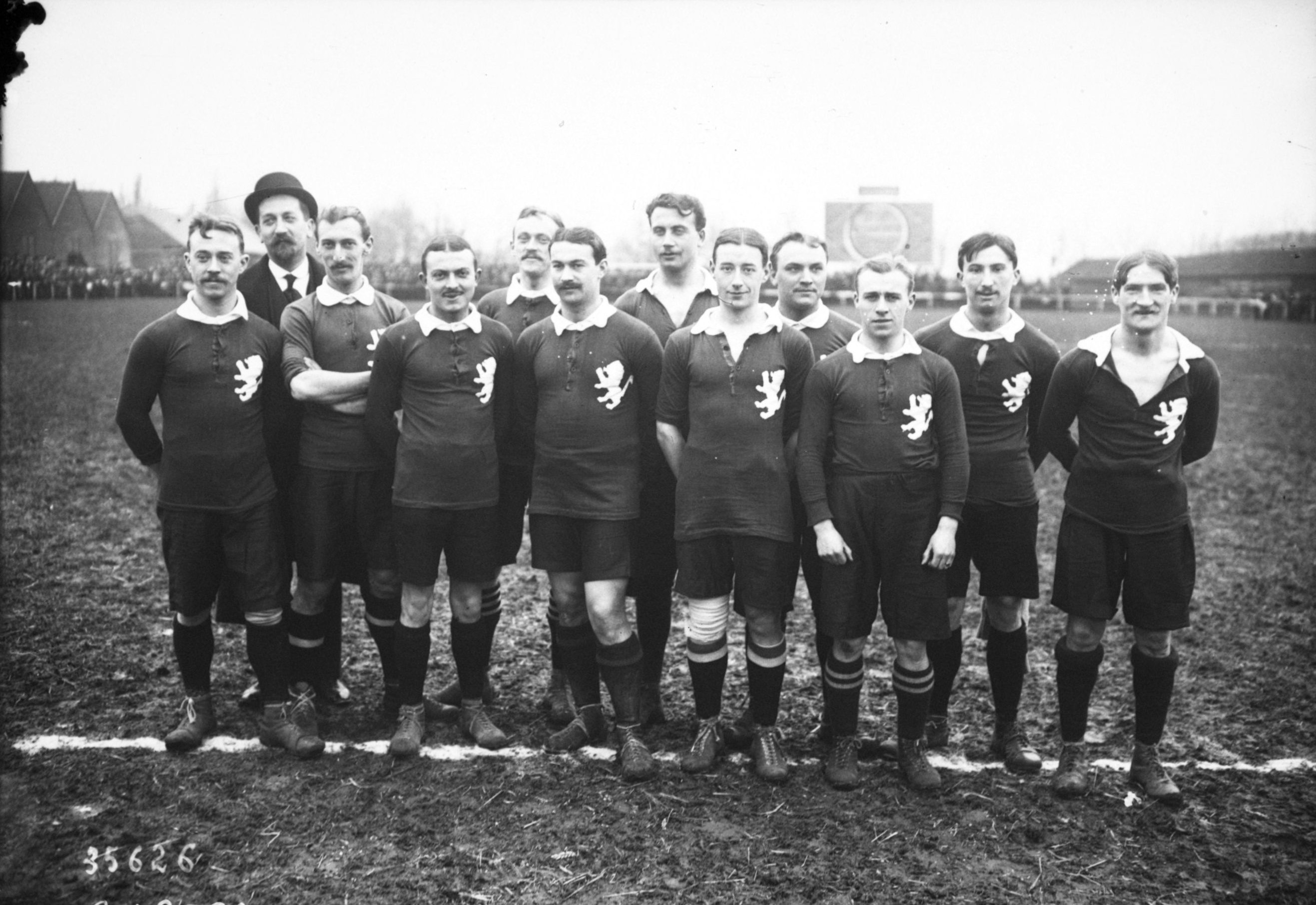
Moigneu (third, from the left) with the Lions of Flanders selection on 4 January 1914.

Moigneu was a member of the French squad that participated in the 1911 UIAFA European Football Tournament at Roubaix, an unofficial European Championship organized by UIAFA, but he did not play in any matches as France was knocked out in the semifinals by Bohemia (1–4); he was initially called up as a replacement for Victor Denis, who had withdraw, and he was then listed in the announcement of the line-ups, but in the end it was a certain Gaudin who played. On 4 January 1914, Moigneu played for the so-called Lions des Flandres, a regional scratch team representing Northern France, in a friendly against the Paris football team; he scored the opening goal in an eventual 3–1 win.

== Military career ==
Moigneu was mobilized at the outbreak of the First World War, where after being injured in October 1914, he was appointed adjutant, but just two months later, in January 1915, he was asked to return to the western front; the day after his return, he was seriously wounded by seven shell fragments". On 1 December 1915, the French newspaper L'Auto stated that "Moigneu, captain of the Tourcoing team and an international from the very beginning, is injured and is currently receiving treatment in the South".

After recovering, he again joined his regimental comrades at the front during the Battle of Verdun in 1916, where a shell nearly took off his left leg, and although he avoided amputation, his leg had to be shortened by eight centimeters during the operation, which left him crippled.

== Later life and death ==
After the War, Moigneu became a cinema director in Saint-Pol-sur-Ternoise. He also remained linked to football, introducing several young players from Frévent to this sport.

Moigneu died in Savigny-sur-Orge on 14 March 1937, at the age of 50, after "a short illness".

== Honours ==
US Tourquennoise

- USFSA Football Northern Championship:
  - Champions (1): 1909
- USFSA Football Championship:
  - Champions (1): 1910
- Challenge International du Nord:
  - Champions (1): 1911
