= Fernand Desrousseaux =

French footballer, manager, and referee

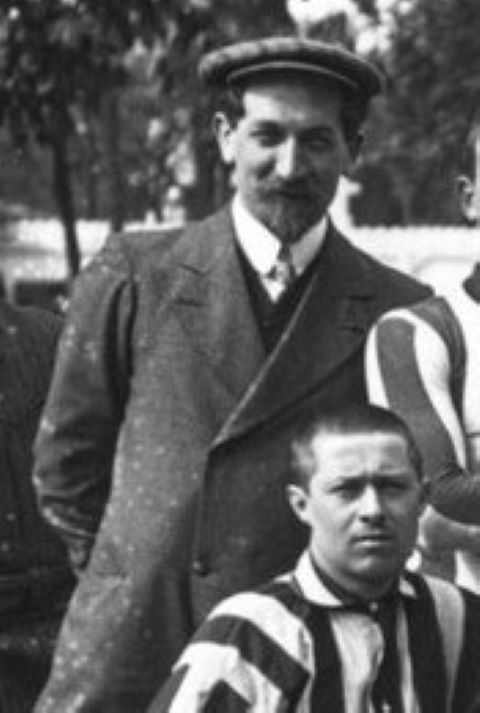
- Fernand Desrousseaux in 1910

Personal information
- Full name: Fernand Louis Adolphe Desrousseaux
- Date of birth: 23 October 1879
- Place of birth: Tourcoing, Nord, France
- Date of death: 26 August 1956 (aged 76)
- Place of death: Tourcoing, Nord, France
- Height: 1.76 m (5 ft 9 in)
- Position: Goalkeeper

Senior career*
Years	Team	Apps	(Gls)
1895–1898	Jeune France		
1898–1910	US Tourquennoise		

International career
1905	Northern France	0	(0)
1908	France B	1	(0)

Managerial career
- 1910–1912: US Tourquennoise
- 1913–1922: Northern France
- * Club domestic league appearances and goals

Fernand Louis Adolphe Desrousseaux (23 October 1879 – 26 August 1956) was a French footballer who played as a goalkeeper for US Tourquennoise, and who competed in the football tournament of the 1908 Olympic Games in London, doing so as a member of the France B squad. He was also a referee and a manager.

== Early life and education ==
Fernand Desrousseaux was born in Tourcoing on 23 October 1879. (Note: Some sources wrongly claim that he was born in Constantine, Algeria, on 3 January 1885, due to a confusion with a certain François Desrousseaux.) Just like his fellow future internationals Émile Sartorius, Adrien Filez, André François, and Gabriel Hanot, Desrousseaux was introduced to football at the Lycée de Tourcoing by an English teacher, Achille Beltette (1864–1932), with whom he co-founded a non-school club, the US Tourquennoise, in May 1898, along with Albert Fromentin, one of the supervisors of the same high school.

== Footballing career ==
=== Refereeing career ===
In 1900, Desrousseaux took the exam to become an official referee, which he passed. He refereed several matches, most notably the final of the 1905 Challenge International du Nord, which was won by the Belgian champions Union Saint-Gilloise. On 9 May 1907, Desrousseaux refereed that year's Paris-Nord meeting, which served as an annual test matches for the French national team.

=== Playing career ===
In the first and second leg matches of the 1900 Northern Championship final, Desrousseaux appeared as full-back, but since his brother Paul also played for the club at the time, it is not possible to confirm if that was Fernand. Having initially played in the positions of fullback and forward, it was in 1904 that Desrousseaux took up the position of goalkeeper. Despite having no specific training for such position, he did well, probably because of his corpulence and great height (1.76 meters, or 13 cm more than the average height at the time); he soon became the club's captain as well. In 1905, he was selected as the goalkeeper of Northern France for the very first Paris-Nord match, an annual test match for the French national team, but the US Tourcoing players ended up not showing up on the day of the match.

In the late 1900s, Desrousseaux was France's fourth or fifth choice behind the likes of Zacharie Baton, Maurice Tillette, André Renaux, and Henri Beau, but despite this, he was able to earn one international cap during the 1908 Olympic Games in London, doing so as a member of the France B squad, conceding a total of nine goals in a resounding loss to Denmark in the quarter-finals; his northern rival Tilliette would do worse with the A team, letting 17 goals go through in the semifinals. However, he was initially not rewarded a cap for this match, thus remaining unknown in the FFF players' archive until recently.

In October 1907, the 28-year-old Desrousseaux was described as the oldest footballer in the North, and the French newspaper L'Auto (the future L'Équipe) stated that "his presence of mind and his skill makes him one of the best goalkeepers in the North, through his somewhat reckless way of playing has turned the supporters of his club either irreducible adversaries or fanatic admirers, although he cares little about the feelings he inspires". Likewise, during the half-time break of the match against Denmark, with France already 0–4 down, the English press noted, horrified, that he was smoking a cigarette on the sidelines. In April 1909, the L'Auto stated that he had "inaugurated a new kind of goal-keeping, by protecting his goal at the halfway line; it is an elegant, but dangerous way", which means that he usually played almost as a full-back, similar to the modern-day Sweeper-keeper. In 1909, he won his second USFSA Northern Championship.

=== Manegerial career ===
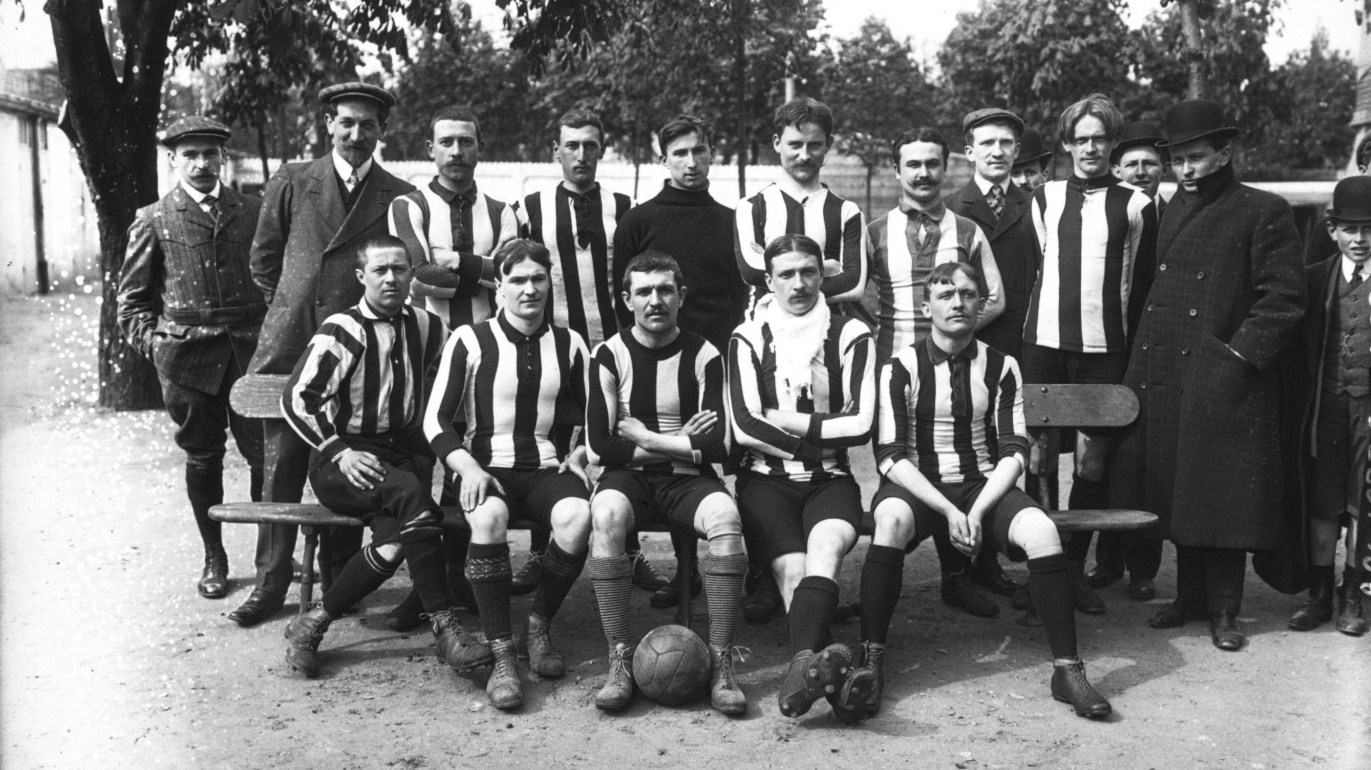
Desrousseaux (standing, dressed with coat, second from left) with the US Tourquennoise team before the final of the 1910 USFSA French championship.

Desrousseaux retired from playing in early 1910, aged 30, being replaced in the UST's goal by Albert Parsys. He subsequently became the club's vice-president and manager, leading the UST to the greatest achievement of the club's history, the 1910 French Championship, beating SH de Marseille 7–2 in the final. Some sources state that he never dared to appear on the field where US Tourcoing was playing a match, preferring to wait in "a nearby café impatiently waiting for the first spectators to come out so he could run for news". An engineer, he remained an important leader of the UST, without ever seeking the presidency, preferring a managerial position.

In the mid-1910s, Desrousseaux became the manager of the Northern France football team, a scratch team representing the Northern Committee of the Union des Sociétés Françaises de Sports Athlétiques (USFSA). In 1922, he was appointed manager of the Northern team for a Paris-Nord match.

== Later life and death ==
During the First World War, Desrousseaux, then secretary of the UST, was taken to Germany as a civilian prisoner, but returned to his homeland in 1915, and was then mobilized in a factory for war supplies.

Desrousseaux died in Tourcoing on 26 August 1956, at the age of 76.

== Honours ==
=== As a player ===
US Tourquennoise

- USFSA Football Northern Championship
  - Champions (2): 1900 and 1909

=== As a manager ===
US Tourquennoise

- USFSA Football Championship:
  - Champions (1): 1910
