= Paris football team =

Association football team of Paris, France

Paris
- Confederation: None
- Home stadium: Parc des Princes; Stade Jean-Bouin

First international
- Paris 0–3 Marylebone FC (England) (Paris, France; 1 April 1893)

Biggest win
- Paris 4–1 Horsmonden School (England) (Paris, France; 8 January 1902); Paris 4–1 Arcadian FC (England) (Paris, France; 2 January 1905)

Biggest defeat
- Paris 0–13 Old Edwardians (England) FC (Paris, France; 12 April 1909)

The Paris football team (French: Équipe de Paris Île-de-France de football) is an association football scratch team mainly consisting of players from Paris, but also of players hailing from other regions and countries playing for Parisian clubs or in the Parisian League. This scratch team was initially selected by the Union des Sociétés Françaises de Sports Athlétiques (USFSA), then by the Ligue de Football Association (LFA), and finally by the French Football Federation (FFF).

The Paris football team plays one-off games against clubs, regional teams, or collectives of other confederations, and as such, no governing body in the sport officially recognizes the team.

== History ==
=== The USFSA era ===
Even before football was recognized by the USFSA in January 1894, the Parisian clubs White Rovers and Standard AC, both of whom consisting mostly of English players, formed an agreement to face the English club Marylebone FC, which came to play in Paris during the Easter holidays of 1893; the English logically won 3–0. On the following day, White Rovers played the first international club game on French soil against Marylebone FC (4–1). A year later, this time under the umbrella of the USFSA, a Paris selection including players from White Rovers, Standard AC, and Club Français faced an agreement between the English clubs Marylebone and Belzice; the English won 2–1.

On 24 February 1895, the first representative team of Paris played a friendly match against the London-based Folkestone at the soggy pitch of the Seine Velodrome, which welcomed 1,500 spectators, a record attendance for a football match in France at the time; the English won 3–0. The only French players who started for the Paris team were the founders of Club Français, Eugène Fraysse and Charles Bernat. Two months later, on 12 April, Paris faced Folkestone again, this time losing 8–0.

On 12 December 1898, a German national selection competed in a football match for the first time, beating the White Rovers 7–0, and on the next day, 13 December, the Germans faced a selection of the best Parisian players from the USFSA, which included five players from Club Français (defenders Sid Wood and Bernat and forwards Fraysse, Grandjean and Jack Wood), four players from Standard AC (goalkeeper Arnull, midfielder J. Hicks, and forwards O. Hicks and Meggs), one from Paris Star (defender Barnold), and one from Racing (midfielder Alfred Tunmer). Two hundred people attended this match, and after a fierce fight, the German team triumphed 2–1, scoring 1 goal in each half, while Paris' goal was scored by Meggs.

=== The LFA era (1910–1919) ===
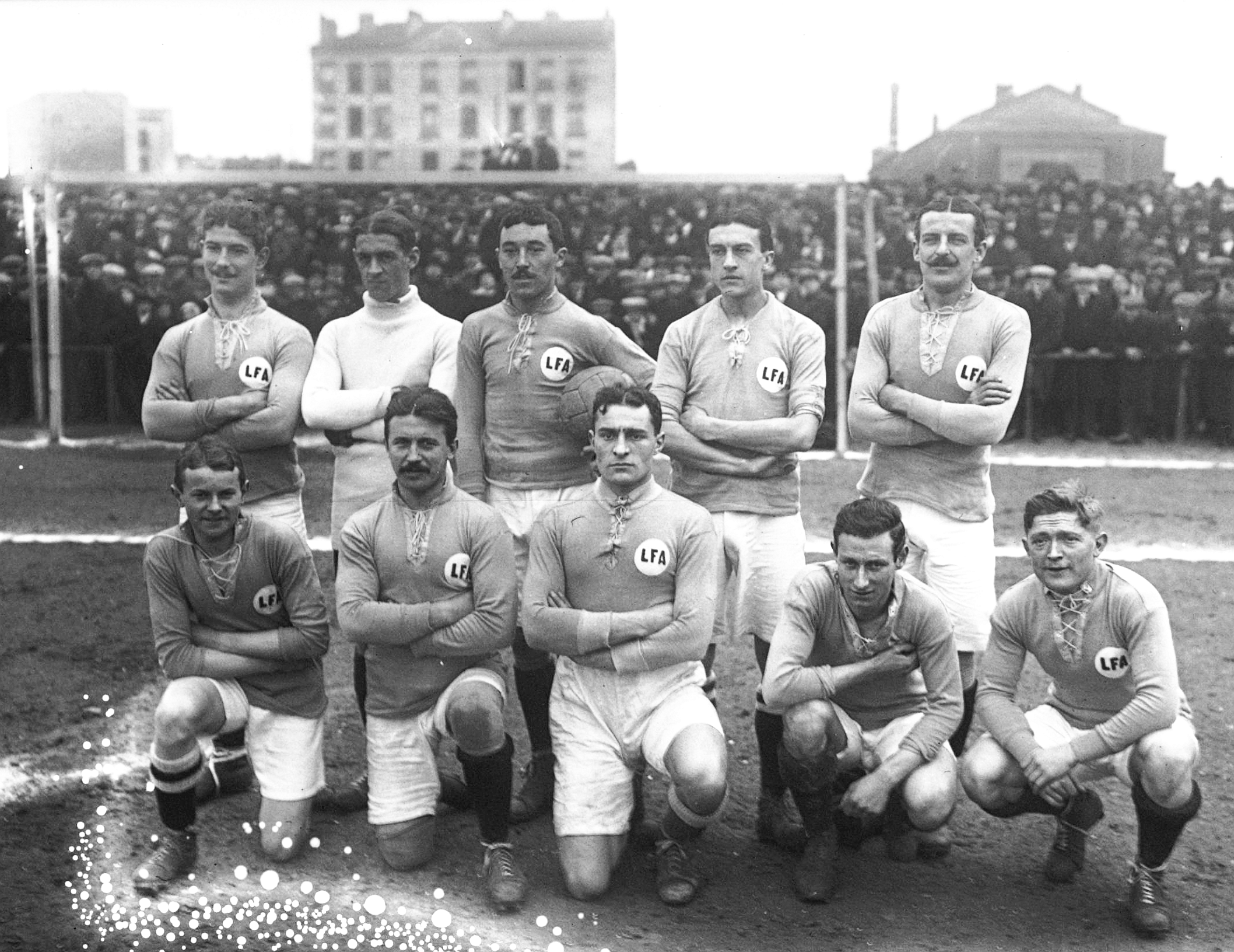
The LFA's Paris selection of 15 March 1914. Standing: Gamblin (Red Star), Germann (US Suisse), Barreau (Levallois), Bigué (CA Paris), Scheibenstock (CA Paris). Squatting: M. Gastiger (Levallois), Mesnier (CA Paris), Devic (Red Star), F. Romano (Levallois), Triboulet (Levallois).

The Ligue de Football Association (LFA), a member of the French Interfederal Committee (CFI), set up a Paris selection in 1910, obtaining disappointing results, because the best Parisian players were now divided into four competing federations (USFSA, LFA, FGSPF, and FCAF), and the LFA could only select its own players, which mainly come from LFA's three flagship clubs: Red Star, CA Paris, and FEC Levallois.

Between 1910 and 1914, LFA's Paris selection played one match against a London League XI every year, losing each time. In the 1912 match, Paris fielded the likes of Pierre Chayriguès, Eugène Maës, Gaston Barreau, Henri Vialmonteil, and René Fenouillière. On 4 January 1914, the LFA's Paris selection traveled to Lille to face the USFSA's Northern France football team, also known as Lions des Flandres, and even though the LFA team fielded several former and current internationals, such as Chayriguès, Maës, Lucien Gamblin, Félix Romano, and captain Barreau, it was the USFSA team that won 3–0. This match was held two months after All Saints' Day of 1913, in which both federations organized a match at the same time, with the LFA team facing the London League in Saint-Ouen, while the USFSA selection faced the amateurs' team of English Wanderers in Auteuil, and this choice proves the acuteness of the rivalry between the federations. In the build-up for a match against Belgium on 25 January 1914, France played a warm-up game against a selection of the foreigner players in Paris, which included both 7 "Liguists" (LFA) and 4 "Unionists" (USFSA), being made-up of 6 Swiss, 3 British, 1 Hungarian, and a Franco-Italian; it ended in a goalless draw.

During the First World War, Northern France was occupied for 4 years and several "Lions" players died in battle, thus weakening the team, but despite this, the LFA's Paris selection was still unable to defeat them when they faced each other again on 11 May 1919, this time at the Stade de Paris in Saint-Ouen, ending in a 4–4 draw.

=== Under the FFF ===
On 7 July 1919, the LFA merged with other national federations to form the French Football Federation (FFF), and the regional team began this new era with a victory against its London counterpart on 1 November 1919 (4–3), at the Stade Bergeyre in Paris. The next day, a rematch was played at the Stade de Paris, and the Parisians confirmed their success by winning 3–1.

== Results ==
=== USFSA ===
| 1 April 1894 Friendly | Select Paris | 0–3 | (England) Marylebone FC | Paris, France |
| | | Report |

| 4 April 1894 Friendly | Select Paris | 1–2 | (England) Marylebone FC/Belsice FC | Paris, France |
| | | Report |

| 24 February 1895 Friendly | Select Paris | 0–3 | (England) Folkestone | Paris, France |
| | H. Whym; Rivaz, Attrill; Bernat, Clarke, Cox; Jack Wood, N. Tunmer, Kemp, Barker, Fraysse | Report | Clares; Harris, Clark; Welch, Harwood, Baker; Barrett, Marks, Collins, Hirons, Andersons | Stadium: Seine Velodrome; Attendance: 1,500 |

| 12 April 1895 Friendly | Select Paris | 0–8 | (England) Folkestone | Paris, France |
| | | Report |

| 28 December 1896 Friendly | Select Paris | 1–2 | (England) English Ramblers | Paris, France |
| | | Report |

| 29 December 1896 Friendly | Parisian English XI (Paris) | 1–4 | (England) English Ramblers | Paris, France |
| | | Report |

| 2 January 1897 Friendly | Paris XI | 0–6 | (England) Horsmonden School | Paris, France |
| | | Report |

| 13 February 1898 Friendly | Select Paris | 1–2 | Germany XI | Paris, France |
| | Meggs Geo Arnull; Barnold, Sid Wood; Bernat, Tunmer, J. Hicks; O. Hicks, Jack Wood, Meggs, Grandjean, Fraysse | Report | ? L. Friese; Westendarf, Paul I Franz, Bensenmann, ScAucker; Paul II, O. Baudach, Wheeler, Walter, Welzler |
Note: Some of the German names are pseudonyms.

| 31 March 1899 Friendly | Paris XI | 0–1 | (England) East Sheen | Paris, France |
| | | Report |

| 1 April 1899 Friendly | Paris XI | 0–3 | (England) East Sheen | Paris, France |
| | | Report |

| 3 April 1899 Friendly | Paris XI | 1–7 | (England) English Ramblers | Paris, France |
| | | Report |

| 8 January 1902 Friendly | Paris XI | 4–1 | (England) Horsmonden School | Paris, France |
| | | Report |

| 9 January 1902 Friendly | Paris XI | 1–3 | (England) Horsmonden School | Paris, France |
| | | Report |

| 10 January 1902 Friendly | Paris XI | 1–3 | (England) Horsmonden School | Paris, France |
| | | Report |

| 1 September 1904 Friendly | Paris XI | 2–11 | (England) Newcastle United | Paris, France |
| | | Report |

| 2 January 1905 Friendly | Select Paris | 4–1 | (England) Arcadian FC | Paris, France |
| | | Report |

| 25 April 1905 Friendly | Paris XI | 4–2 | (England) English Ramblers | Paris, France |
| | | Report |

| 20 January 1907 Friendly | Select Paris | 4–3 | (England) North London FC | Paris, France |
| | | Report |

| 1 April 1907 Friendly | Paris XI | 1–3 | (England) Old Etonians | Paris, France |
| | | Report |

| 25 December 1907 Friendly | Select Paris | 1–6 | (England) Select London | Paris, France |
| | | Report |

| 17 April 1908 Friendly | Comité de Paris | 1–5 | (England) Corinthian | Paris, France |
| | | Report |

| 12 April 1909 Friendly | Paris XI | 0–13 | (England) Old Edwardians FC | Paris, France |
| | | Report |

| 1 January 1910 Friendly | Select Paris | 1–10 | (England) Select London | Paris, France |
| | | Report |

| 29 March 1910 Friendly | Select Paris | 0–2 | (England) Civil Service | Paris, France |
| | | Report |

| 24 July 1910 Friendly | Paris | 3–1 | Catalonia | San Sebastián, Spain |
| | Triboulet; Mathey | | Comamala |

| 30 October 1910 Friendly | Select Paris | 0–6 | (England) Civil Service | Paris, France |
| | | Report |

| 11 December 1910 Friendly | Comité de Paris | 2–4 | (England) Middlesex County | Paris, France |
| | | Report |

=== LFA ===
| 18 December 1910 Friendly | Select Paris | 0–5 | (England) London League | Paris, France |
| | | Report |

| 8 December 1912 Friendly | Select Paris | 0–2 | (England) Select London | Paris, France |
| | Chayriguès; Massip, Letailleur; Lhermitte, Vascout, Barreau; Niggli, Rouchès, Maës, Vialmonteil, Fenouillière | Report1; Report2 | A. Nicholls; F. T. Weblin, Scholl; W. Hales, A. Whyman, J. W. Sudds; S. Wayment, R. Noble, G. W. Bell, H. J. Mallett, S. Croll | Referee: M. J. C. Starck |

| 1 November 1913 Friendly | Select Paris | 0–5 | (England) London League | Paris, France |
| | Germann; Zullig, Gravier; Devic, Vascout, Barreau; Niggli, Surmick, Maës, Romano, Triboulet | Report1 (page 38) Report2 | Chapman 0–1', 0–2' ? 0–3'; Vascout 0–4', o.g.' Broster 0–5' Thomas Newton; Rhodes, Ford; Broster, Critcher (capt.), C. G. Garland; Greenaway, Chapman, McMahon, Keene, G. A. Littier | Referee: Stark (president of the London Referees Association) |

| 4 January 1914 Friendly | Lions des Flandres (France) | 3–0 | Select Paris | Lille, France |
| 14:34 | Lesur 34'; Six 72'; Dubly 78' Parsys; Moigneu, Hanot; Dujardin, Ducret, Gravelines; Dubly, Chandelier, Lesur, Six, Eloy | Report | Chayriguès; Gravier, Pellan; Devic, Gamblin, Barreau; Romano, Rouchès, Maës, Morel, Triboulet | Referee: M. Tromp (Netherlands) |

| 18 January 1914 Friendly | France | 0–0 | Foreigners of Paris | Paris, France |
| | | Report (page 45) | Germann; Zullig, Romano; Jordan, Eggenschwyler, Steiner; Niggli, Matthey, Surwick, Solka, Burgin | Stadium: Saint-Michel Legion Stadium |

| 15 March 1914 Friendly | Select Brussels (Belgium) | 1–1 | Select Paris | Saint-Ouen, France |
| | | Report (page 45) | | Stadium: Stade de Paris |

| 22 March 1914 Friendly | Select Paris | 1–5 | (England) London League | Paris, France |
| | | Report (page 46); Report2 |

| 12 May 1919 Friendly | Select Paris | 4–4 | (France) Lions des Flandres | Saint-Ouen, France |
| | | Report | | Stadium: Stade de Paris |

=== Modern ===
| 1 November 1924 Friendly | Select Paris | 1–3 | (England) Select London | Paris, France |
| | | Report1 |

| 1 November 1925 Friendly | Paris | 2–3 | Catalonia | Hauts-de-Seine, France |
| | Cordon; Maulene | | Samitier; Cros; Martínez | Stadium: Stade de Colombes; Referee: Vandewegaete |

| 16 May 1926 Friendly | Catalonia | 4–0 | Paris | Barcelona, Catalonia |
| | Sastre; Pedrol; Broto | Report | | Stadium: Camp de Les Corts; Referee: Mariné |

| 12 June 1927 Friendly | Select Paris | 0–3 | (England) Motherwell | Paris, France |
| | | Report1 |

| 30 October 1928 Friendly | Select Paris | 1–2 | (England) Select London | Paris, France |
| | | Report1 |

| 20 May 1929 Friendly | Select Paris | 1–3 | (England) Middlesex Wanderers | Paris, France |
| | | Report1 |

| 22 May 1932 Friendly | Paris XI | 3–1 | (England) Newcastle United | Paris, France |
| | | Report |

| 21 May 1933 Friendly | Select Paris | 1–3 | (England) Blackburn Rovers | Paris, France |
| | | Report |

| May 1934 Friendly | Select Paris | 0–3 | (England) Middlesex Wanderers | Amsterdam, Netherlands |
| | | Report1 |

| 14 April 1935 Friendly | Select Paris | 3–3 | (England) Select London | Paris, France |
| | | Report1 |

| 22 May 1938 Friendly | Select Paris | 2–1 | (England) Wolverhampton Wanderers | Paris, France |
| | | Report1 |
