= Achille Beltette =

English teacher, humanitarian, and sportsperson

- Born: Achille Victor Albert Beltette; 11 December 1864; Harbonnières, Somme, France
- Died: 1 July 1932 (aged 67)
- Citizenship: Spanish
- Occupations: Professor; Humanitarian
- Known for: Co-founder of US Tourquennoise

Achille Victor Albert Beltette (11 December 1864 – July 1932) was an English teacher, and a union activist of the Federation of Secondary School Teachers in the Seine. Outside of his academic career, he was also the Municipal Councilor of Tourcoing from 1912 to 1920, and a member of the Food Relief Committee during the German occupation of 1914–18.

He was also one of the founders of US Tourquennoise in May 1898, whose team was mainly composed of students from the Tourquennois high school.

== Early life and education ==
Achille Beltette was born in the Somme town of Harbonnières on 11 December 1864, as the son of Jean-Baptiste, a wheelwright, and Victorine Devillers, who had no profession.

Beltette attended primary school in his native village, run by the teacher Evariste Harduin, to whom he was very grateful for his teaching and who encouraged him to undertake secondary studies at the college of Saint-Riquier (Somme).

== Academic career ==
After obtaining his baccalaureate in literature, Beltette pursued higher education at the Faculty of Literature in Lille, while being a supervisor at the Lycée Jean Bart in Dunkirk (1883–1885), then a primary school teacher and acting as a general supervisor at the Lycée Gambetta-Carnot (1886–1888). He was matriculated in the contingent military in 1884, with the matriculation number 387.

After obtaining a degree in literature with a secondary certificate in English literature in 1887, the 23-year-old Beltette became a professor in charge of English courses at the Lycée Gambetta (Tourcoing), where he spent most of his career. Beltette also gave courses at the Collège Sévigné (a girls' upper primary school) and participated in adult education from 1900 to 1913. He was distinguished as an officer of the French Academy in 1902 and an officer of public instruction in 1908. Despite failing the competitive examination four times, Beltette still managed to acquire in the city, as in high school, a "very legitimate consideration" according to the inspector general in 1908.

== Sporting career ==
During an internship across the English Channel, Beltette developed a deep interest in the sport of football, and he went on to become one of the pioneers of its diffusion in northern France. In 1885, Beltette, then a professor at the Lycée Gambetta, created the first recorded association football team in Northern France, the so-called Jeune France, which played the first games of football in that region, contested by teams made up of high school students, thus imitating the English educational models. Therefore, Beltette introduced the sport of football to several of his students, many of which would later become French internationals, such as Adrien Filez (5), Fernand Desrousseaux (1), Gabriel Hanot (12), Jules Dubly (1), and Henri Moigneu (8).

In May 1898, Beltette finally created a non-school club, the US Tourquennoise (Jeune's natural extension), with the help of a supervisor from the same high school, Albert Fromentin, who was elected the club's first-ever president, while Beltette had to wait over a decade to become it so as well. In its first years of existence, the club was mainly composed of students from the Tourquennois Lycée Gambetta. On 26 March 1899, Beltette was a guest in a banquet at the Hôtel du Cygne in Tourcoing, which was held following the conclusion of the final of the Challenge International du Nord, where his club (UST) had been knocked-out in the semifinals. Two years later, he was among the many sporting notables who attended the final of the 1901 Challenge International du Nord between Beerschot and Léopold de Bruxelles.

Under his presidency, the UST won the USFSA Northern Championship in 1911–12, but in the following year, they lost in the final to Olympique Lillois (2–0); Beltette, however, congratulate OL on their victory and wish them to bring back to the North the trophy of the USFSA National Championship.

== Humanitarian career ==
Also in 1912, Beltette was elected the municipal councilor of Tourcoing, a position that he held for eight years until 1920. During the German occupation after 1914, he was a member of the Food Relief Committee for destitute families. He was then taken hostage among other teachers, and in January 1918, he was deported from Vilnius (present-day Lithuania) to a reprisal camp. On 9 November 1918, he was convicted of espionage by a court martial in Brussels, but he was then released by the Armistice of 11 November 1918. This earned him the Legion of Honour on 30 September 1920, as well as the British War Medal on 18 September 1919, for services rendered to the English army during the war.

== High figure in national and international education ==
In 1904 and 1905, Beltette participated in creating the French Federation of High School Teachers (FFPL), becoming its treasurer in 1907. In May 1912, Albert Fedel (1870–1961) and Beltette, respectively president and representative of the FFPL, were the French representatives of the congress that created the International Bureau of National Federations of Public Secondary Education Personnel (BIES) in Brussels, becoming one of its leaders.

After the war, he was Secretary General of the BIES from 1920 to 1931; before the 1926 congress held in Geneva, Beltette and Jean Clavière, who had been his colleague in Dunkirk, expressed their objectives to the press: "The work of peace, as the League of Nations is trying to achieve it, will encounter constantly renewed difficulties, as long as the educators of those who will be the intellectual elite of the nations, that is to say, the secondary school teachers, have not modified the state of mind of the peoples and created in the world the new spirit that present-day humanity demands".

Beltette was considered a "fervent republican".

== Death ==
Beltette died in July 1932, at the age of 67.
