= Henri Lesur =

French footballer

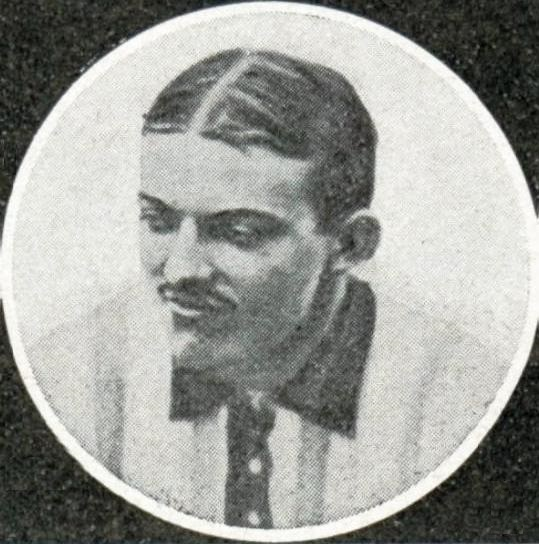
- Lesur in 1913

Personal information
- Full name: Henri Ferdinand Édouard Marie Joseph Lesur
- Date of birth: 25 October 1892
- Place of birth: Tourcoing, France
- Date of death: 1 March 1971 (aged 78)
- Place of death: Tourcoing, France
- Position: Forward

Senior career*
| Years | Team | Apps | (Gls) |
| 1912–1914 | US Tourquennoise | | |
| 1914–1918 | Altengrabow | | |

International career
| 1913–1914 | France | 6 | (0) |
| 1914 | Northern France | +1 | (0) |
| 1919 | France military | 4 | (0) |
Medal record
Men's football
Representing France
Football at the Inter-Allied Games
| Silver medal – second place | 1919 | {{{2}}} |
- * Club domestic league appearances and goals

Henri Ferdinand Édouard Marie Joseph Lesur (25 October 1892 – 1 March 1971) was a French footballer who played as a forward for US Tourquennoise and the French national team between 1912 and 1914.

== Biography ==
Born in Tourcoing in October 1892, (Note: Some sources wrongly claim that he was born on 24 February 1887 in Aisne.) Lesur played his entire career at his hometown club US Tourquennoise between 1912 and 1914.

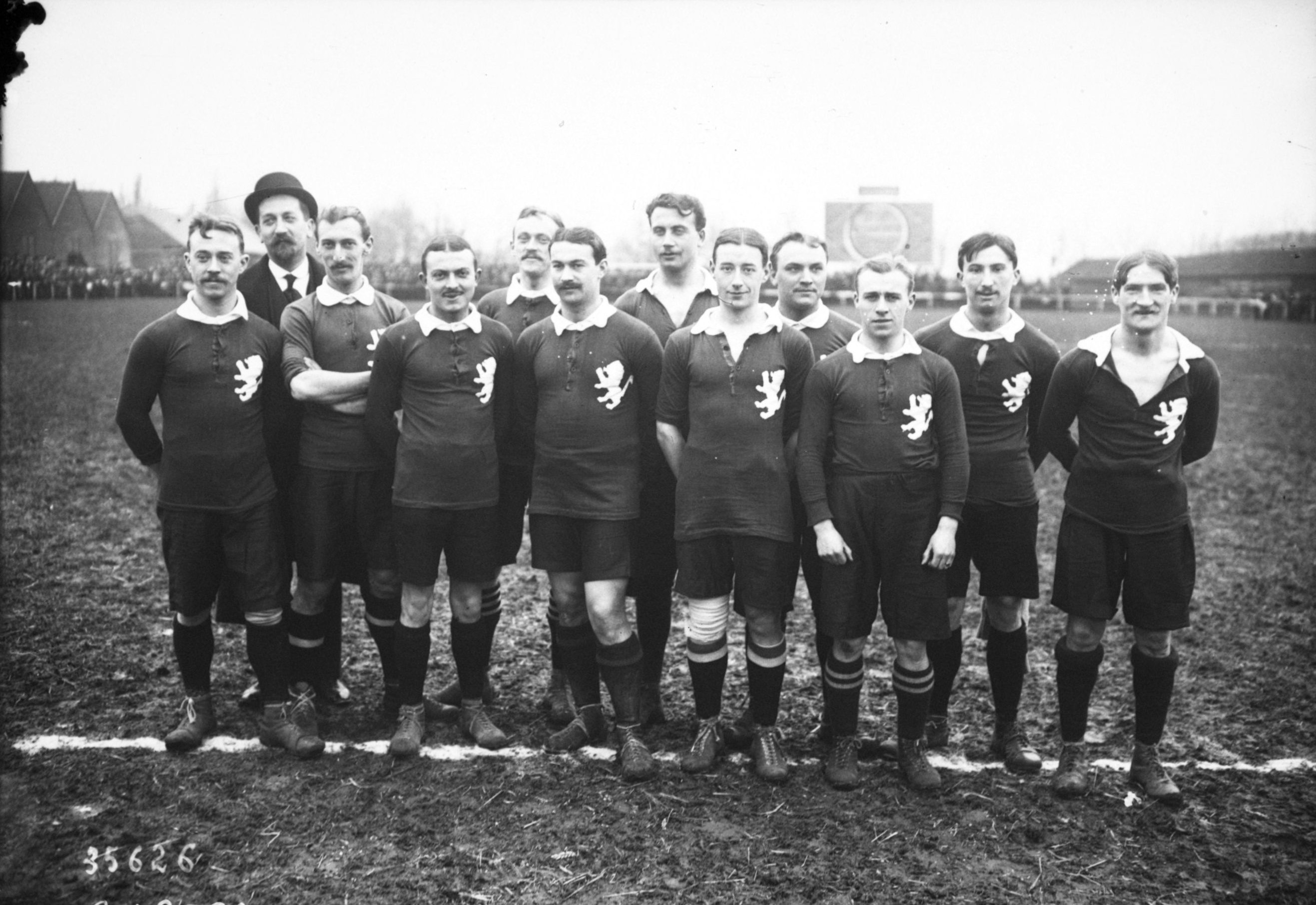
Lesur (fourth, from the left) with the Lions of Flanders selection on 4 January 1914.

On 16 February 1913, the 20-year-old Lesur earned his first international cap for France in a friendly match against Belgium at Uccle, which ended in a 0–3 loss. He played a further five matches for France, the last of which was on 31 May 1914, against Hungary, and although the French lost 5–1, he provided an assist in the first minute of the game to debutant Juste Brouzes, who thus became the fastest to score for the French national team. On 4 January 1914, Lesur played for the so-called Lions des Flandres, a regional scratch team representing Northern France, in a friendly against the Paris football team.

During the First World War, he was wounded and taken prisoner on 23 August 1914 in the battle of Saint-Gérard, and was then interned in the Altengrabow camp, alongside Gabriel Hanot. In the summer of 1919, the 27-year-old Lesur was a member of the French committee that went to the Inter-Allied Games in Paris, a large sports competition organized in celebration of the Allied victory in the War, being listed as a member of the football team, whose squad was formed by soldiers who had participated in the War. He helped his side reach the final on 29 June, which ended in a 2–3 loss to Czechoslovakia.

== Later life and death ==
After the War, Lesur became a wool merchant in Tourcoing, where he died on 1 March 1971, at the age of 78.

== Honours ==
France

- Inter-Allied Games
  - Runner-up (1): 1919
