= Charles Dujardin =

French footballer (1888–1914)

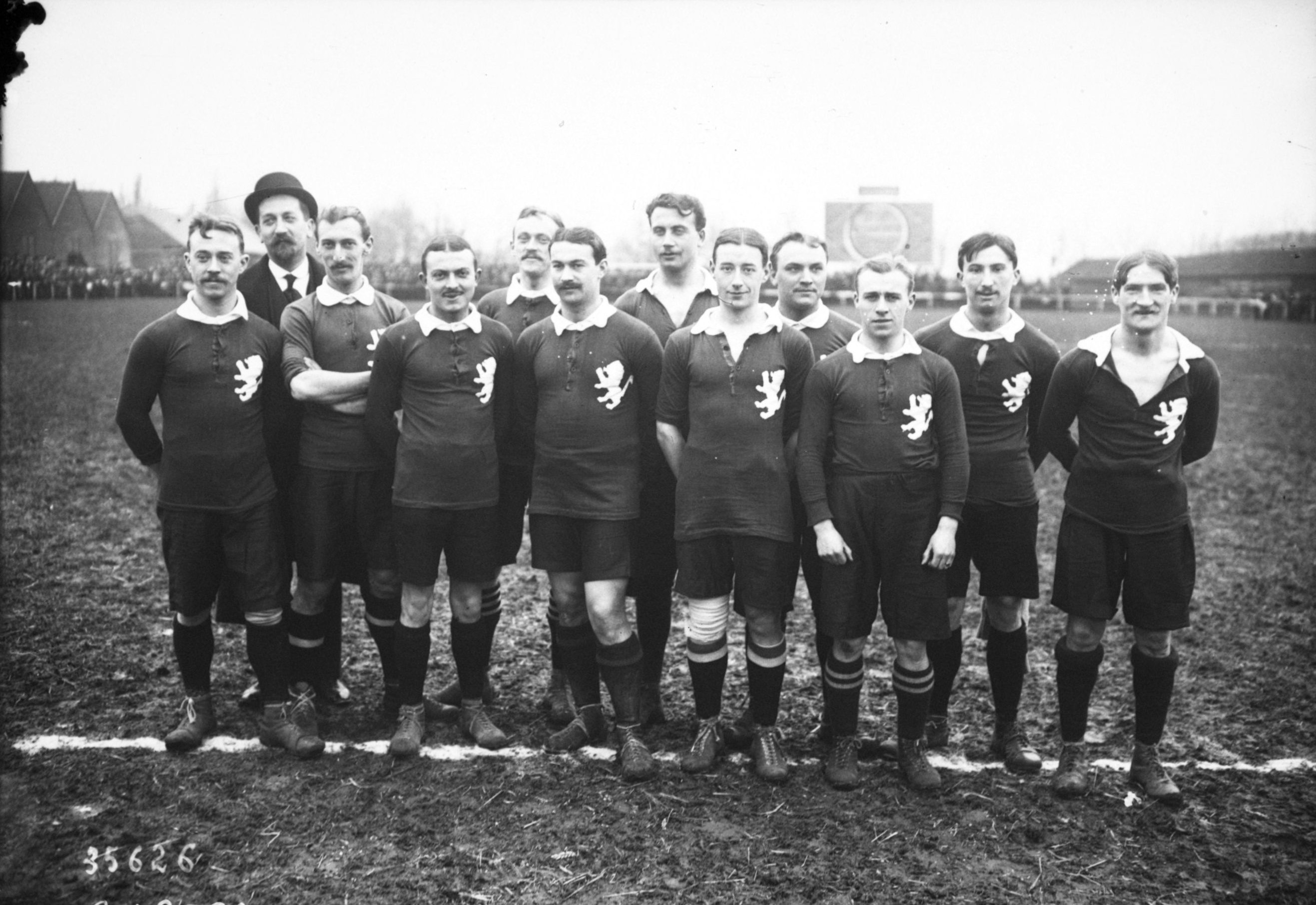
- Dujardin (first from the left) with the Lions of Flanders selection in 1914.

Personal information
- Full name: Charles Joseph Just Marie Dujardin
- Date of birth: 25 October 1892
- Place of birth: Tourcoing, France
- Date of death: 1 March 1971 (aged 78)
- Place of death: Le Hérie-la-Viéville, France
- Position: Midfielder

Senior career*
Years	Team	Apps	(Gls)
1912–1914	US Tourquennoise		

International career
1913–1914	France	6	(0)
1914	Northern France	+1	(0)
- * Club domestic league appearances and goals

Charles Joseph Just Marie Dujardin (15 April 1888 – 29 August 1914) was a French footballer who played as a midfielder for US Tourquennoise and the French national team in the early 1910s.

== Career ==
Born in Tourcoing on 15 April 1888, Dujardin played his entire career at his hometown club US Tourcoing between 1912 and 1914. On 9 March 1913, the 24-year-old Dujardin Lesur earned his first (and only) international cap for France in a friendly against Switzerland in Geneva, helping his side to a 4–1 win. The following day, the journalists of the French newspaper L'Auto (currently known as L'Équipe) stated that he "had some lapses since he had the best wing to mark; nevertheless, he was satisfactory". His selection was decided by a coin toss.

On 4 January 1914, he played for the so-called Lions des Flandres, a regional scratch team representing Northern France, in a friendly against the Paris football team.

== Death ==
Outside football, he worked as a printer in Tourcoing. A corporal in the 43rd Infantry Regiment, Dujardin was killed in Le Hérie-la-Viéville on 29 August 1914, within the first weeks of the First World War.

== Bibliography ==
- Perry, Raphaël (2021). Bleus éphémères [Ephemeral blues] (in French). Paris: Hugo Sport. p. 43. ISBN 978-2-7556-9244-0.
