= Albert Bell =

Albert Bell may refer to:

- Albert Bell (American football) (born 1964), wide receiver in the National Football League
- Albert Bell (footballer, born 1898), English footballer
- Albert Henry Bell (fl. 1906–1914), English amateur footballer
- Albert Bell (boxer), American boxer

== See also ==
- Albert Belle (born 1966), former American Major League Baseball outfielder
