= Jules Dubly =

French footballer

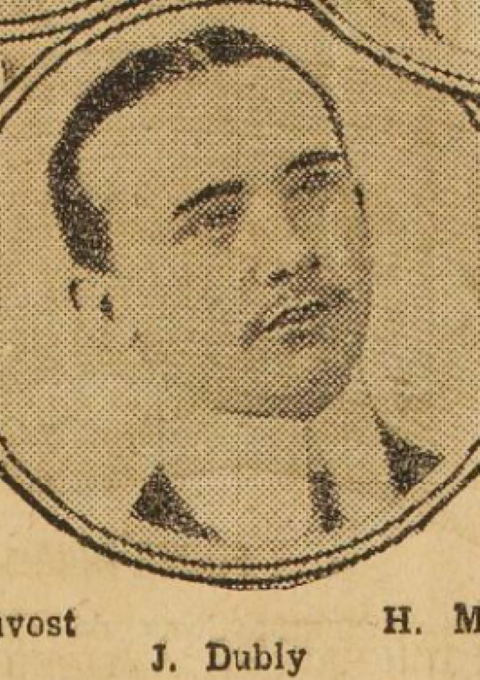
- Dubly in 1913

Personal information
- Full name: Jules Dubly
- Date of birth: 9 August 1886
- Place of birth: Tourcoing, Nord, France
- Date of death: 21 November 1953 (aged 67)
- Place of death: Tourcoing, Nord, France
- Height: 1.66 m (5 ft 5 in)
- Position: Forward

Senior career*
Years	Team	Apps	(Gls)
1909–1914	US Tourquennoise		
1914–1918	Chemnitz		
1919–1921	US Tourquennoise		

International career
1914	France	1	(0)
1919	Northern France	1	(0)
- * Club domestic league appearances and goals

Jules Dubly (9 August 1886 – 21 November 1953) was a French footballer who played as a forward for US Tourquennoise and the French national team in the 1910s. Unlike popular belief, he has no family connection with the Dubly family of Roubaix, whose Jean and Raymond were also French internationals around the same time as him.

== Playing career ==
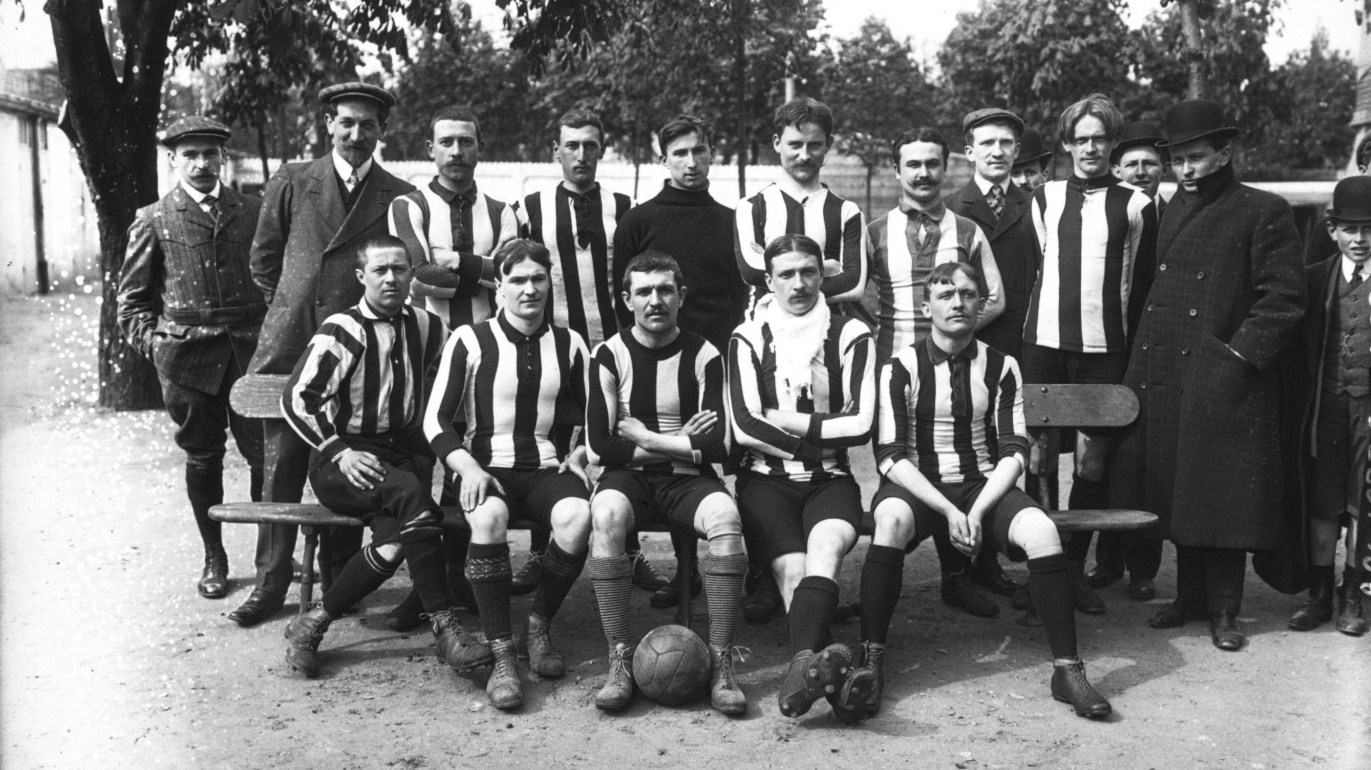
Dubly (seated, first from right) with the US Tourquennoise team before the final of the 1910 USFSA French championship.

Jules Dubly was born in Tourcoing, Nord, on 9 August 1886, (Note: Some sources wrongly state that he was born on 30 December 1889.) as the son of a tramway employee. He began his football career at his hometown club US Tourquennoise in 1903, aged 17, and in October 1907, he was described by Ernest Weber, the star journalist of the French newspaper L'Auto (the forerunner of L'Équipe), described him as "playing in the first team for 4 years, featuring successively inside right", and even though he was carrying out his mandatory military service at the time, Dubly intended to play in the team each time he was on leave.

Together with Albert Parsys, Henri Moigneu, and Gabriel Hanot, Dubly was a member of the UST team that won back-to-back USFSA Northern Championships in 1909 and 1910, thus qualifying the club to the USFSA French Championship, winning the final of the 1910 edition on 1 May at the Parc des Princes, following a 7–2 win over SH de Marseille, a club made up of Swiss and English immigrants.

In the following year, on 29 April 1911, Dubly started in the final of the Challenge International du Nord in Tourcoing, helping his side to a 2–1 win over the English club Cambridge Town. In February 1914, the local press described him as "best Tourquennois forward" during a key match against Olympique Lillois, but despite this, he failed to be called up by the French team because of the Lillois' Paul Chandelier, who was much more "scientific". It was only because of Henri Bard's refusal to be selected (who was demanding money), that on 29 March 1914, the 27-year-old Dubly finally earned his first (and only) international cap for France in a friendly match against Italy in Turin, which ended in a 2–0 loss. For many years, it was widely believed that Jules was the brother of Jean Dubly, a fellow international who was born in the same year, but in Roubaix, which is rather close to Tourcoing.

=== Later career ===
Dubly was mobilized during the outbreak of the First World War, but just a month later, in September 1914, he was taken prisoner in Maubeuge, spending four years in a prison camp in Chemnitz, where he was able to play football to kill time. He was repatriated only on 11 December 1918, one month after the Armistice of 11 November 1918.

Despite his advanced age of 33, Dubly once again put on the UST jersey, and in May 1919, he was even selected for Northern France, a regional football scratch team representing the Northern Committee of the Union des Sociétés Françaises de Sports Athlétiques (USFSA). In September of the same year, he was hailed as "the best forward" in a match against Racing de Roubaix (2–2), and his form was such that he was even selected as a substitute for the match against Switzerland in February 1920 in Geneva, when he was approaching 34 years old, which was exceptional at the time. In 1921, he was still a substitute for US Tourcoing, during the semifinal of the Coupe de France against Olympique de Paris, which ended in a 2–3 loss.

== Later life ==
Employed in a textile factory, Dubly was nonetheless president of US Tourquennoise, which had a brief professional adventure in the 1930s before returning to amateurism, and also a municipal councilor of Tourcoing.

Dubly died in Tourcoing on 21 November 1953, at the age of 66.

== Honours ==
US Tourquennoise

- USFSA Football Northern Championship:
  - Champions (2): 1909 and 1910
- USFSA Football Championship:
  - Champions (1): 1910
- Challenge International du Nord:
  - Champions (1): 1911
