= Georges Bon =

French footballer (1886–1949)

Personal information
- Full name: Georges Gabriel Bon
- Date of birth: 14 July 1886
- Place of birth: Boulogne-sur-Mer, France
- Date of death: 18 December 1949 (aged 63)
- Place of death: Forcalquier, France
- Height: 1.79 m (5 ft 10 in)
- Position: Forward

Senior career*
Years	Team	Apps	(Gls)
1906–1908	US Boulogne		

International career
1907	France	1	(0)
1907–1911	Northern France	2	(1)
1910	France (unofficial)	1	(0)
- * Club domestic league appearances and goals

Georges Gabriel Bon (14 July 1886 – 18 December 1949) was a French footballer who played as a forward for US Boulogne in the early 20th century. He also played one match for the French national team in 1907.

== Career ==
Georges Bon was born in Boulogne-sur-Mer on 14 July 1886, as the son of a customs officer. He began his football career at his hometown club US Boulogne, whose pitch, called the Moulin Wibert, was perched on top of a cliff, thus being both steep and exposed to all the winds. At the time, Northern France had two separate regional championships: the land and the maritime, whose winners were opposed in a final, and Boulogne therefore usually played against Dunkerque FC and its main rivals RC Calais in the maritime championship, and then only met RC Roubaix or US Tourcoing in the regional final, which they lost regularly; and in fact, in Bon's first such final in 1906, Boulogne was beaten 1–0 by Roubaix thanks to a goal from André François.

Bon was 1.79 meters tall (the equivalent of over 1.90 m at the time), so he was comfortable with being more physical on the pitch. On 1 November 1906, probably because of his size, Bon was pre-selected for his first international match for France, a friendly against England amateurs, with the following comment: "Completely unknown in Paris, he is considered one of the best forwards in the North". However, he remained an unused substitute, thus avoiding being part of a 15–0 humiliating defeat.

Basically, Boulogne, Calais, and Dunkirk played in a closed environment, so international football was far from their concerns, but his performance in the 1907 match between the Nord and Paris (scored once in a 4–1 win), which served as annual test matches for the French national team, convinced France's head coach, the Northerner André Billy, to give him a chance in a friendly match against Belgium at Uccle on 21 April 1907. During the match, he co-scored the winning goal (2–1), which was described in the press as follows: "Puget crosses the ball into the area where; at the same time, François, Bon, and Camard push the Belgian goalkeeper Robert Hustin together, and the four men roll into the net". The goal is generally attributed to François, but, given the size of Bon, it is quite possible that it was he who sent Hustin to the back of his goal; no one interviewed the players to clarify this point. After this match, France's captain Fernand Canelle congratulated Bon, stating that he was "an example to French forwards; he knew how to mark his opponent the moment they received the ball, and this saved his half-backs and full-backs unnecessary work"; in other words, Bon was the first French forward to carry out defensive work in international matches, doing so spontaneously (because there was no coach at the time).

Despite Canelle's compliment, Bon never became unanimous, and likewise, he was not selected in any of the next three Paris-Nord meetings between 1908 and 1910, but when he finally got another chance in 1911, he delivered two assists in a 3–1 win. His unanimousity was such that ahead of the football tournament of the 1908 Olympic Games in London, the USFSA selected him only for the would-be France C squad that was originally listed to compete in the tournament, but Bon ended up not traveling to London because the USFSA decided to send only two instead of three teams. When the USFSA left FIFA in 1908, the CFI took its place, but the northern clubs remained loyal to the Union, and on 12 March 1910, the USFSA assembled a national team to face England AFA in order to show the press that its team was superior to that of the CFI, beaten 11–0 in 1909, but ended up being humiliated with a resounding 20–0 loss. Bon was praised as France's best player, being the author of France's only shot on target, thus giving the "English goalkeeper its only opportunity to make an effort". After the match, he was also described by the French press as "a solid, very powerful guy, who never misses the opportunity to place a remarkably precise shot".

== Later life and death ==
Outside of football, Bon was a customs officer in Boulogne, just like his father. He remained the captain of US Boulonnaise until the outbreak of the First World War, during which he was sent to the front, before being discharged in 1916 for bronchitis, which was serious enough to send him to the hospital in Brest. He was then assigned to the auxiliary services of customs officer, becoming a customs lieutenant in Dieppe.

In 1934, Bon obtained an assignment to Marseille, where he ended his career in the Customs department in 1944. He subsequently retired to Forcalquier, where he died on 18 December 1949, at the age of 63.
