= Charles Van de Veegaete =

Belgian referee and sports leader

- Born: Charles Van de Veegaete; 22 December 1877; Ghent, Belgium
- Died: 1956 (aged 68-69)
- Citizenship: Belgian
- Occupations: Referee; Sports leader; Author
- Known for: Founder and president of US Tourquennoise

President of US Tourquennoise
- In office 1910–1912
- Preceded by: Albert Fromentin
- Succeeded by: Achille Beltette

Charles Van de Veegaete (22 December 1877 – 1956) was a Belgian international referee who was a co-founder, president, and patron of US Tourquennoise, whose stadium now bears his name. He is the author of one of the first books on refereeing, L'Arbitre, the first edition of which appeared in the mid-1950s.

== Sporting career ==
In 1898, Van de Veegaete participated in the creation of the US Tourquennoise (UST), where he was captain of the first team until 1904, when he retired. In 1910, he became the club's president, a position that he held for two years, when he was replaced by fellow UST co-founder Achille Beltette. In 1913, he was serving as the Secretary of the Football Commission of UST, and he remained an active part of the club until as late as 1923, when the local press stated that "Charles Van de Veegaete, the excellent referee from the North, who has been, for about twenty-five years, the driving force, the very soul of the Union Sportive Tourquennoise". His affection for the club was such that he only reluctantly attended the matches played by his protégés, and when they were in difficulty, "he looks away, so strong is his emotion".

Van de Veegaete also worked as a sports journalist, writing articles for northerners newspapers, including one about the final of the 1913 USFSA Northern Championship between UST and Olympique Lillois, which ended in a 2–0 win to the latter, but even though it was his club that lost, he showed great sportsmanship by wished good luck to OL and for them to bring the French Cup back to the North.

In 1905, Van de Veegaete became a referee and joined the Regional Arbitration Commission of the North, going on to officiate for more than 20 years, being even a linesman in a friendly international match between France and England on 21 May 1925 at the Colombes. Van de Veegaete is especially recognized in the world of football for having written one of the first treatises on refereeing, such as L'Arbitre, the first edition of which appeared in the mid-1950s.

== Later life ==
During the First World War, Van de Veegaete remained in Tourcoing, "waiting for his children to come and deliver him from the yoke of the invader".

== Death and legacy ==
Van Veegaete was named a knight of the Legion of Honour in 1949. He died in 1956, at the age of either 68 or 69.

The stadium of Tourquennoise US now bears his name.

== Works ==
- L'Arbitre (1956)
- Le football et ses règles
- L'arbitre de football: 463 questions et réponses sur les 17 lois du jeu avec 42 diagrammes de hors-jeu / L'art de se placer et de se déplacer / Quelques conseils à l'arbitre ("The football referee: 463 questions and answers on the 17 laws of the game with 42 offside diagrams / The art of positioning and moving / Some advice for the referee").
