= Patrick Fradj =

French footballer (born 1992)

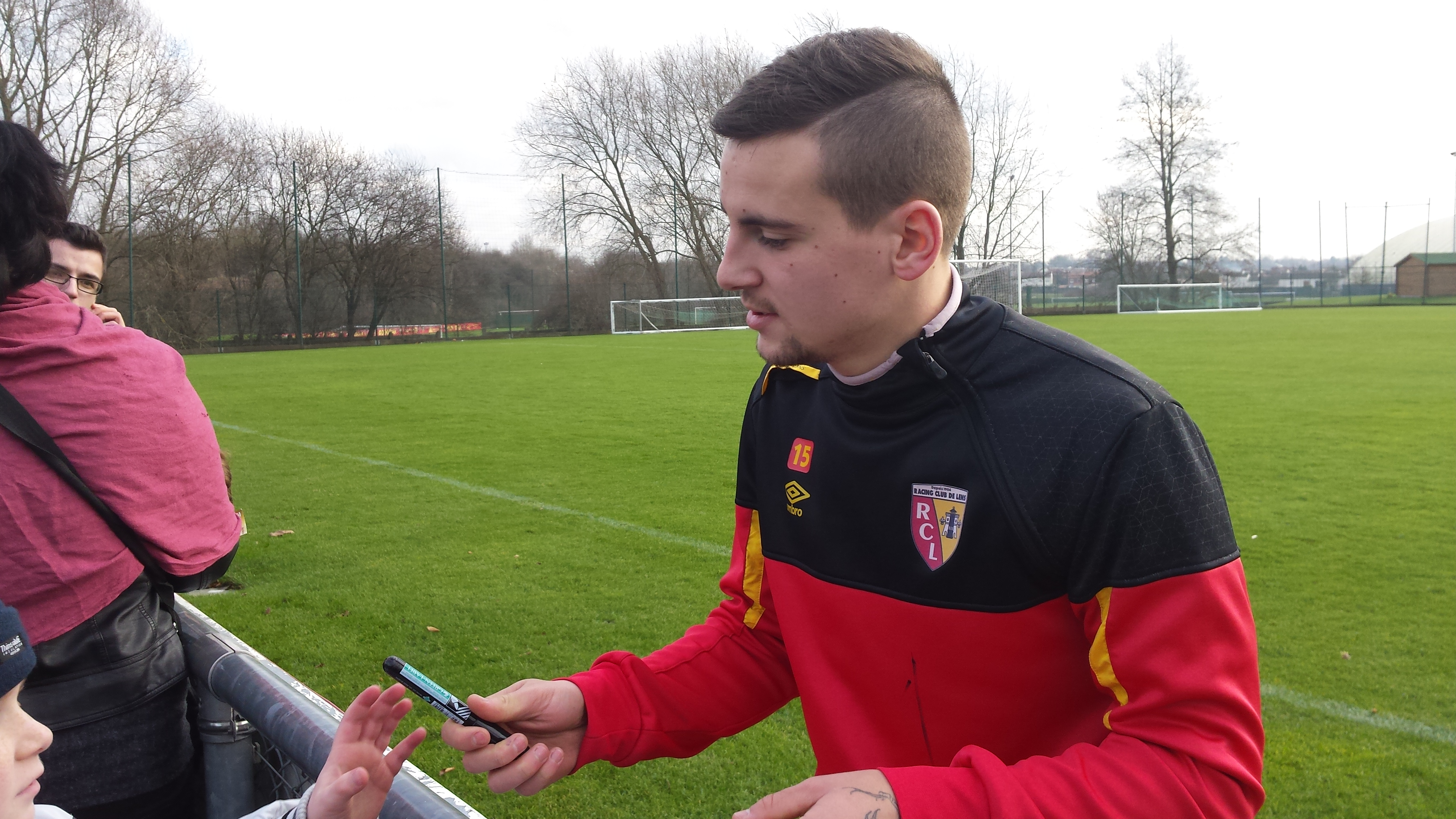
- Fradj in December 2014.

Personal information
- Full name: Patrick Fradj
- Date of birth: 11 March 1992 (age 34)
- Place of birth: Saint-Saulve, France
- Height: 1.75 m (5 ft 9 in)
- Position: Right-back

Team information
- Current team: Tourcoing

Youth career
- –2012: Lens

Senior career*
Years	Team	Apps	(Gls)
2011–2015	Lens II	95	(0)
2012–2015	Lens	8	(0)
2015–2018	IC Croix	46	(2)
2018–	Tourcoing	6	(0)
- * Club domestic league appearances and goals as of 12:38, 7 April 2019 (UTC)

Patrick Fradj is a French footballer who plays as a right-back for US Tourcoing FC.
