= Victor Farvacque =

French footballer (1902–1940)

Victor Farvacques
Personal information
- Full name: Victor Gérard Farvacques
- Date of birth: 30 September 1902
- Place of birth: Tourcoing, Nord, France
- Date of death: 25 April 1940 (aged 37)
- Place of death: Gravelines, Nord, France
- Position: Left wing

Senior career*
Years	Team	Apps	(Gls)
1927—1928	US Tourcoing		

International career
1928	France	1	(0)
- * Club domestic league appearances and goals

Victor Gérard Farvacques (or Farvacque; 30 September 1902 – 25 April 1940) was a French footballer who played as a left winger.

== Career ==
Farvacques played for US Tourcoing and he made his first and only appearance for the France national team on the 21 February 1928 in a friendly match in Paris against Ireland. France won 4–0.

During World War II, he served in the 310th Infantry Regiment and died in battle at Gravelines in 1940.
