= Antoine Rouchès =

French footballer (1893–1974)

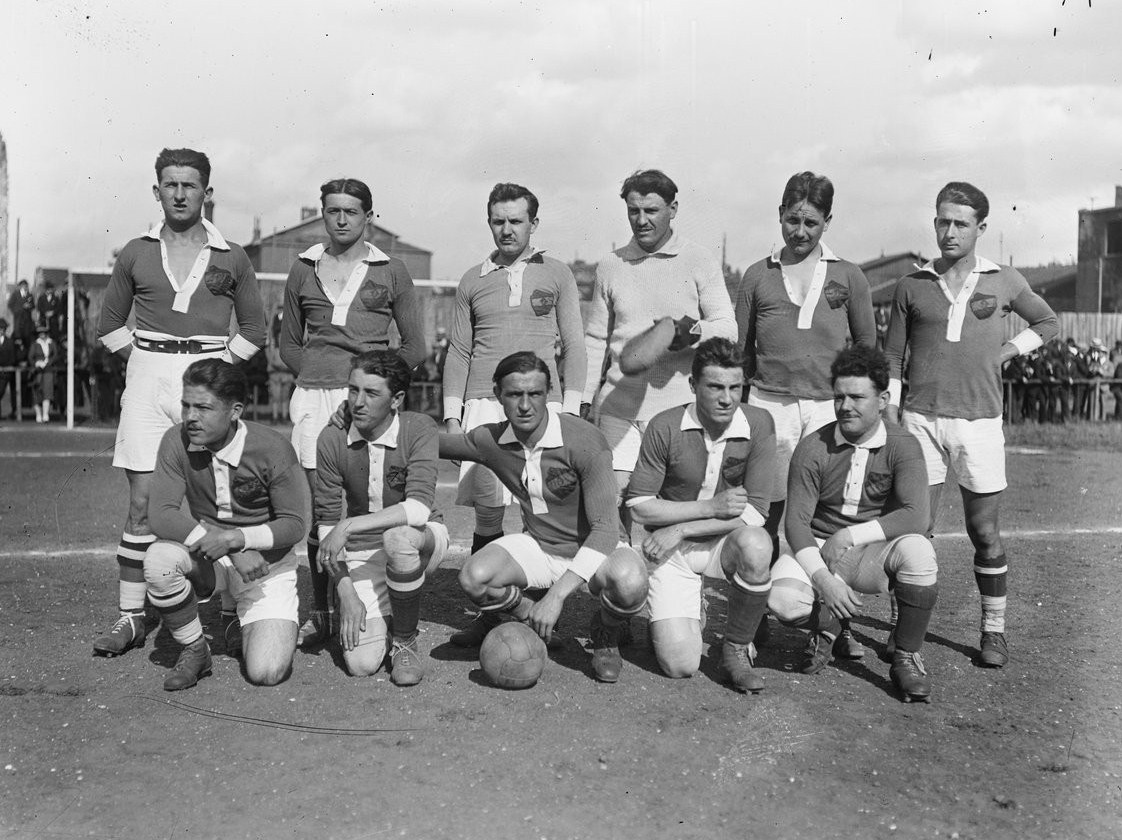
- Rouchès (crouching, third from left) in 1920

Personal information
- Date of birth: 21 May 1893
- Place of birth: 13th arrondissement of Paris, France
- Date of death: 23 February 1974 (aged 80)
- Place of death: Montreuil, France
- Position: Forward

Senior career*
Years	Team	Apps	(Gls)
1911–1913	CA Vitry		
1913–1914	Red Star		
1919–1922	Olympique de Pantin		

International career
1912–1914	Paris	2	(0)
1919	France military	1	(0)
1921	France	1	(0)
- * Club domestic league appearances and goals

Antoine Rouchès (21 May 1893 – 23 February 1974) was a French footballer who played as a forward for Olympique de Pantin and the France national team in the early 1920s.

== Playing career ==
Born on 21 May 1893 in the 13th arrondissement of Paris, Rouchès began his football career at his hometown club CA Vitry, where he quickly stood out from the rest, thus being selected to play for a Paris selection (LFA) in a friendly against a London XI. He then joined Red Star; on 4 January 1914, he played for Paris in a friendly against the so-called Lions des Flandres, a regional scratch team representing Northern France.

Once the First World War ended, Rouchès took part in the 1919 Inter-Allied Games in Paris, a large sports competition organized in celebration of the Allied victory in the War, being listed as a member of the football team, whose squad was formed by soldiers who had participated in the War. Two years later, on 6 March 1921, the 27-year-old Rouchès earned his first (and only) international cap for France in a friendly match against Belgium at Forest, which ended in a 3–1 loss. During the match, he hit the post, and later the referee disallowed a goal from Henri Bard on the pretext that Rouchès was offside, even though he had fallen and thus "could not hinder the opposing defenders either directly or indirectly".

Together with Émile Fiévet, Louis Darques, and Jules Dewaquez, he was a member of the great Pantin team of the early 1920s, which won the Ligue de Paris in 1921, and reached the 1921 Coupe de France final, in which he failed to score past Pierre Chayriguès in an eventual 2–1 loss to his former club Red Star.

== Death ==
Rouchès died in Montreuil on 23 February 1974, at the age of 80.

== Honours ==
Olympique de Pantin

- Coupe de France:
  - Runner-up: 1920–21
- Ligue de Paris
  - Champions (1): 1921
  - Runner-up (1): 1922
