= Morsain =

- Commune
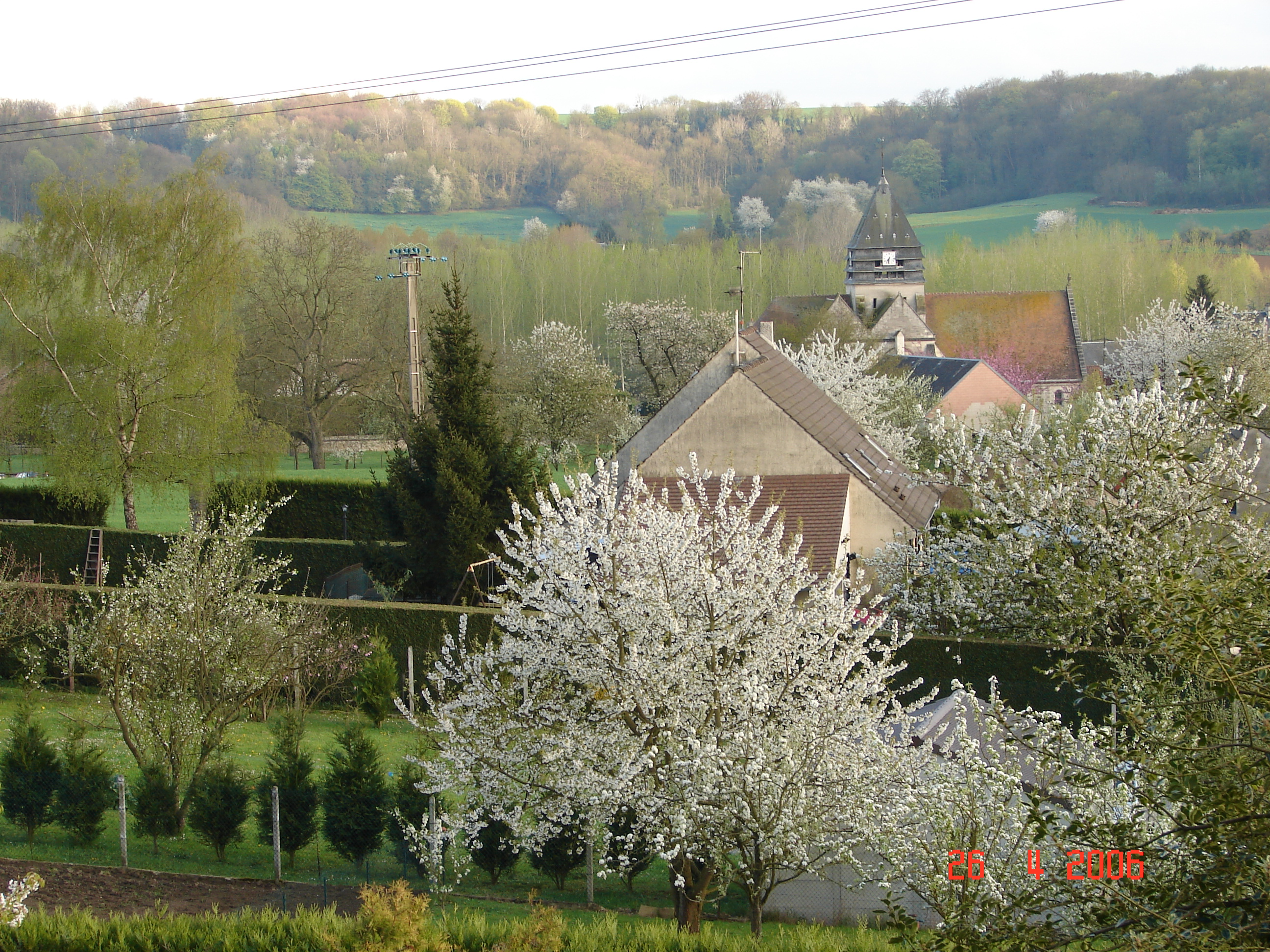
- A general view of Morsain
- Location of Morsain
- Location within France Location within Hauts-de-France
- Coordinates: 49°27′15″N 3°10′50″E
- Country: France
- Region: Hauts-de-France
- Department: Aisne
- Arrondissement: Soissons
- Canton: Vic-sur-Aisne

Government
  - Mayor (2026–32): Jean Sellier
- Area^{1}: 14.34 km^{2} (5.54 sq mi)
- Elevation: 82 m (269 ft)
- Highest elevation: 154 m (505 ft)
- Lowest elevation: 52 m (171 ft)
- Population (2023): 469
  - Density: 32.7/km^{2} (84.7/sq mi)
- Time zone: UTC+01:00 (CET)
  - Summer (DST): UTC+02:00 (CEST)
- INSEE/Postal code: 02527 /02290
- ^{1} French Land Register data, which excludes lakes, ponds, glaciers > 1 km^{2} (0.386 sq mi or 247 acres) and river estuaries.

Morsain (French pronunciation: [mɔʁsɛ̃]) is a commune in the Aisne department in Hauts-de-France in northern France.

== Population ==
Historical population
Year	Pop.	±% p.a.
1968	425	—
1975	394	−1.08%
1982	369	−0.93%
1990	398	+0.95%
1999	417	+0.52%
2007	429	+0.36%
2012	423	−0.28%
2017	444	+0.97%
2023	469	+0.92%
Source: INSEE

== See also ==
- Communes of the Aisne department
