= Tom Grey =

English footballer

Personal information
- Full name: Thomas Grey
- Date of birth: 5 March 1885
- Place of birth: Whitley Bay, England
- Date of death: 1957 (aged 71–72)
- Height: 5 ft 9 in (1.75 m)
- Position: Centre-half

Senior career*
| Years | Team | Apps | (Gls) |
| 1906–1907 | Whitley Athletic | | |
| 1907 | Sunderland | 1 | (0) |
| 1907–1908 | Bedlington United | | |
| 1908–1910 | Newcastle United | 0 | (0) |
| 1910–1911 | Blyth Spartans | | |
| 1911–1915 | Newcastle United | 1 | (0) |
| 1919–19?? | Newcastle Bohemians | | |

International career
| 1912–1914 | England Amateurs | 3 | (0) |
- * Club domestic league appearances and goals

Thomas Grey (5 March 1885 – 1957) was an English amateur footballer who played as a centre-half in the Football League for Sunderland and Newcastle United. He was capped by England at amateur level.

== Personal life ==
Grey served as a private in the Tyne Electrical Engineers during the First World War.

== Career statistics ==
Appearances and goals by club, season and competition
| Club | Season | League | | | FA Cup | | Total | |
| Club | Season | Division | Apps | Goals | Apps | Goals | Apps | Goals |
|---|---|---|---|---|---|---|---|---|
| Sunderland | 1907–08 | First Division | 1 | 0 | 0 | 0 | 1 | 0 |
| Newcastle United | 1913–14 | First Division | 1 | 0 | 0 | 0 | 1 | 0 |
| Career total | | | 2 | 0 | 0 | 0 | 2 | 0 |
