= Le Hérie-la-Viéville =

- Commune
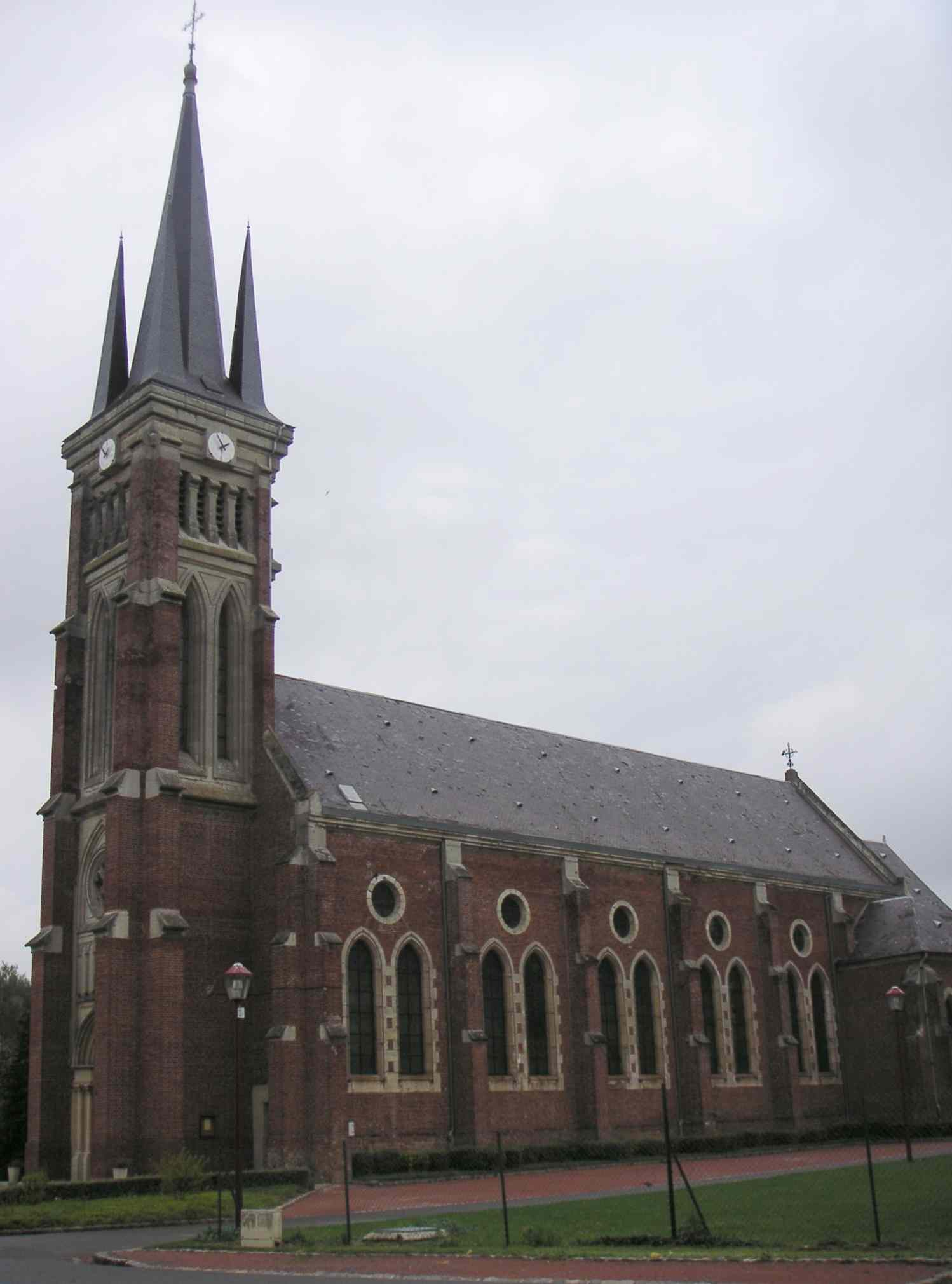
- The church of Le Hérie-la-Viéville
- Location of Le Hérie-la-Viéville
- Location within France Location within Hauts-de-France
- Coordinates: 49°49′23″N 3°38′44″E
- Country: France
- Region: Hauts-de-France
- Department: Aisne
- Arrondissement: Vervins
- Canton: Marle
- Intercommunality: Thiérache du Centre

Government
  - Mayor (2026–32): Michaël Tellier
- Area^{1}: 9.27 km^{2} (3.58 sq mi)
- Elevation: 107 m (351 ft)
- Highest elevation: 152 m (499 ft)
- Lowest elevation: 82 m (269 ft)
- Population (2023): 192
  - Density: 20.7/km^{2} (53.6/sq mi)
- Time zone: UTC+01:00 (CET)
  - Summer (DST): UTC+02:00 (CEST)
- INSEE/Postal code: 02379 /02120
- ^{1} French Land Register data, which excludes lakes, ponds, glaciers > 1 km^{2} (0.386 sq mi or 247 acres) and river estuaries.

Le Hérie-la-Viéville (French pronunciation: [lə eʁi la vjevil]) is a commune in the Aisne department in Hauts-de-France in northern France.

== Population ==
Historical population
Year	Pop.	±% p.a.
1968	278	—
1975	251	−1.45%
1982	213	−2.32%
1990	197	−0.97%
1999	243	+2.36%
2007	228	−0.79%
2012	241	+1.12%
2017	230	−0.93%
2023	192	−2.96%
Source: INSEE

== See also ==
- Communes of the Aisne department
