= Albert Henry Bell =

English footballer

Personal information
- Place of birth: England
- Place of death: Unknown
- Position: Defender

Senior career*
Years	Team	Apps	(Gls)
1906–1914	Worthing		

International career
1908–1914	Surrey County FA	+2	(0)
1908	Great Britain	0	(0)
1909–1910	England Amateurs	5	(0)
Medal record
Men's football
Representing Great Britain
Olympic Games
Gold medal – first place	1908 London	Team competition
President of Worthing
Vice-president of Surrey County FA
- * Club domestic league appearances and goals

Albert Henry Bell was an English amateur footballer who played as a right-back for Worthing and England Amateurs in the early 20th century. He was a member of British squad that participated in the football tournament of the 1908 Summer Olympics, but he did not play in any matches. He later served as president of Worthing and as a vice-president of the Surrey County FA.

== Career ==
During the early stages of his career, which was all spent playing as an amateur right-back at non-League club Worthing, Bell was unable to earn a single cap for England Amateurs due to the presence of Birmingham's Watty Corbett, one of England's best right-backs who was at the peak of his career at the time.

Having represented the Surrey county in an international trial match at Chelsea in February 1908, Bell was selected as a member of Great Britain's 18-man squad that participated in the football tournament of the 1908 Summer Olympics in London, but Corbett once again blocked him from playing in any matches as the team won gold.

In the 1909 international trial at Birmingham, Bell captained the South against the North, and remained an unused substitute against Germany in March 1909. The following month, on 12 April, he took advantage of Corbett's absence to finally make his international debut for England Amateurs, in a friendly match against the Netherlands, keeping a clean-sheet in a 4–0 win. Having earned four of his five international caps within 40 days, from 12 April until 22 May 1909, he then had to wait for nearly a year for his fifth cap in a 2–2 draw with Belgium on 26 March 1910. After his match against France on 22 May, which ended in a resounding 11–0 victory, the journalists of the French newspaper L'Auto (the forerunner of L'Équipe) stated that "Bell got caught out a couple of times, but was still a dangerous back".

On 1 November 1913, Bell played for the so-called English Wanderers in a friendly against Lions des Flandres, a regional scratch team representing Northern France, helping his side to a 1–4 win. He captained the Surrey county side for seven seasons, from 1908 until the outbreak of World War I in 1914.
