= Albert Bell (footballer, born 1898) =

English footballer (1898–1973)

Personal information
- Full name: Albert Bell
- Date of birth: 8 February 1898
- Place of birth: Sunderland, England
- Date of death: 1973 (aged 74–75)
- Position: Full-back

Senior career*
Years	Team	Apps	(Gls)
1919–1920	South Pontop Villa		
1920	Annfield Plain		
1920	West Stanley		
1920–1923	Aston Villa	0	(0)
1923–1924	Leeds United	1	(0)
1925–1927	Accrington Stanley	70	(0)
1927–1928	Durham City	18	(0)
1928–1929	Annfield Plain		
1929–1930	Consett		
Total		89	(0)
- * Club domestic league appearances and goals

Albert Bell (8 February 1898 – 1973) was an English footballer who played in the Football League for Accrington Stanley, Durham City and Leeds United.
