= Félix Romano =

Footballer (1894–1970)

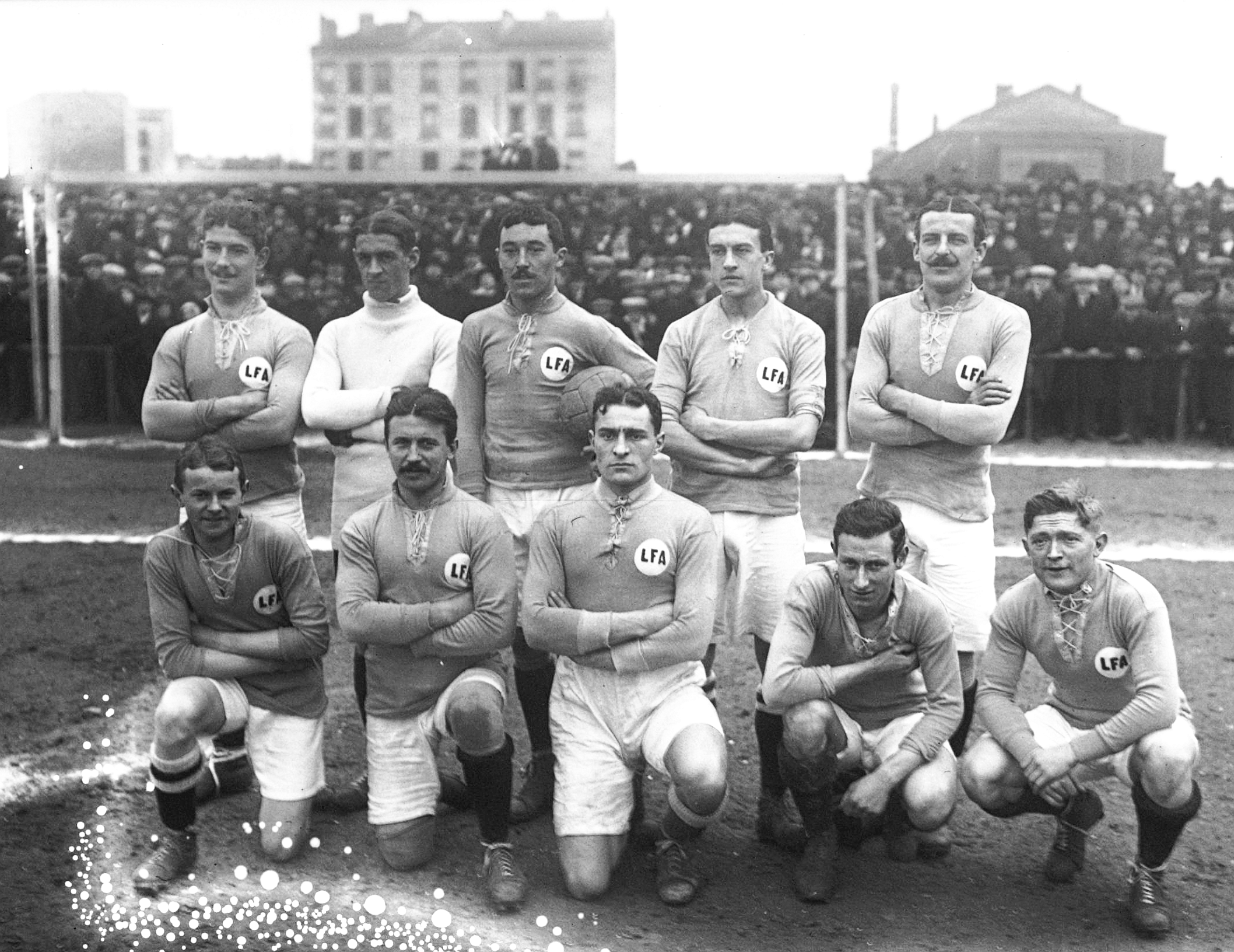
- Football selection of the LFA (Parisian football league) on 15 March 1914, Saint-Ouen. Standing: Lucien Gamblin (Red Star), Germann (US Switzerland), Gaston Barreau (FEC Levallois), Maurice Bigué (CA Paris), Scheibenstock (CA Paris). Squatting: Maurice Gastiger (FEC Levallois), Louis Mesnier (CA Paris), Émilien Devic (Red Star), Félix Romano (II) (FEC Levallois), Marcel Triboulet (FEC Levallois).

Personal information
- Date of birth: 30 November 1894
- Place of birth: Buenos Aires, Argentina
- Date of death: 30 November 1970 (aged 76)
- Position: Midfielder

Senior career*
Years	Team	Apps	(Gls)
1912–1914	Étoile des Deux Lacs		
1919–1921	Torino	22	(3)
1921–1926	Reggiana	83	(37)
1926–1927	Genoa	14	(4)
1927–1928	Racing Club de France		
1928–1930	Reggiana	5	(1)
Total		124	(45)

International career
1913	France	1	(0)
1921–1924	Italy	5	(0)
- * Club domestic league appearances and goals

Félix Romano, also known as Felice (30 November 1894 – 30 November 1970) was a footballer who played international football for both France and Italy. Born in Buenos Aires, Argentina, he played as a midfielder for Étoile des Deux Lacs, Torino, Reggiana, Genoa and Racing Club de France.
