= Saint-Michel Legion Stadium =

Football stadium in Paris, France

Stade de la Légion Saint-Michel
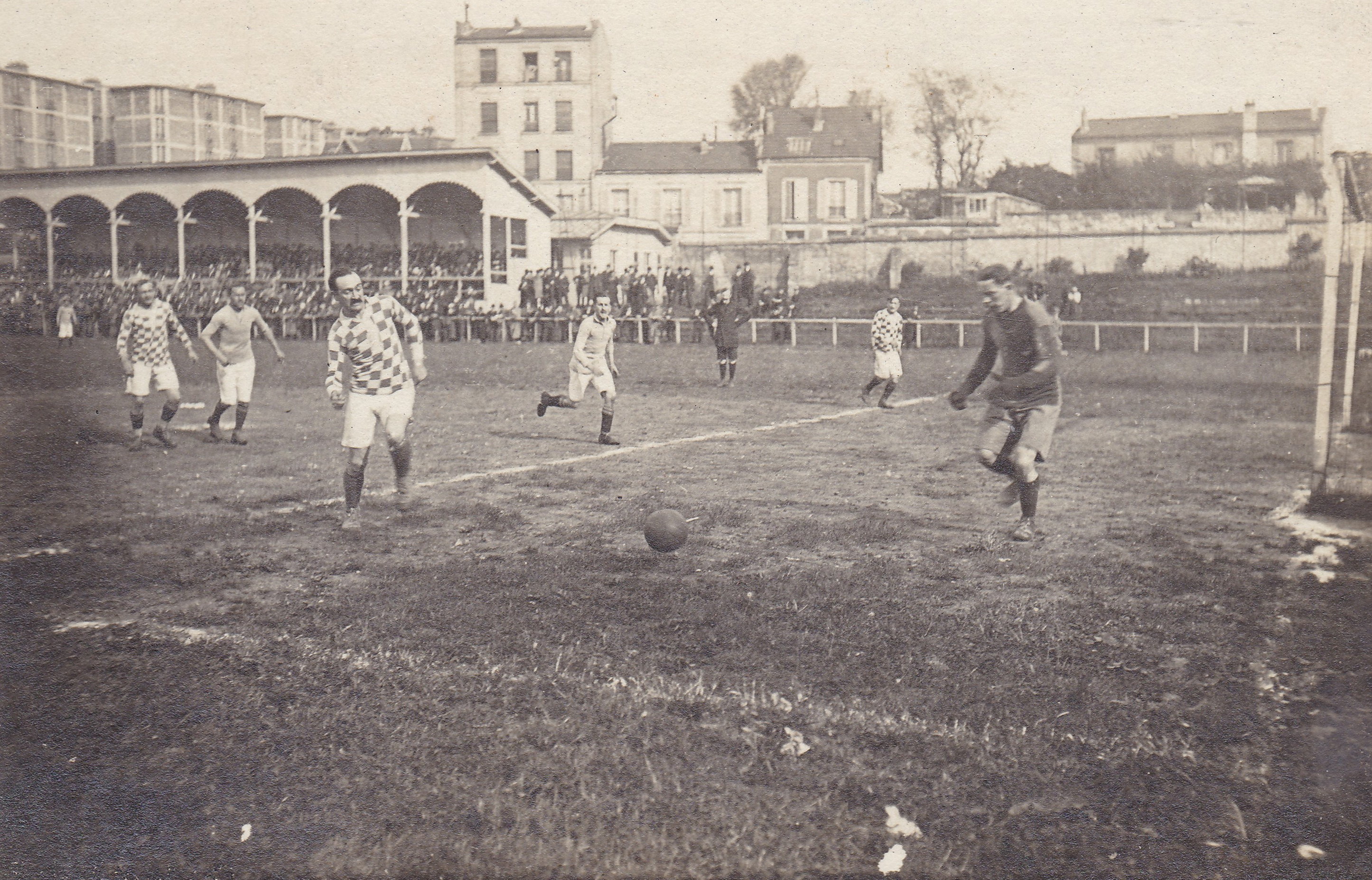
- 1918 Final of Coupe de France between Olympique de Pantin and FC Lyon
- Interactive map of Stade de la Légion Saint-Michel
- Address: 78-84 rue Olivier de Serres; 15th arrondissement Paris; France

Construction
- Opened: 1918

The Saint-Michel Legion Stadium, also known by its first name as the Stade de la rue Olivier-de-Serres, is a former football stadium, located on rue Olivier-de-Serres in the 15th arrondissement of Paris.

== History ==
This stadium hosted the final of the first edition of the French Football Cup, on 5 May 1918. It was played between Olympique de Pantin and FC Lyon and ended with a victory for Olympique de Pantin (3-0). This site is one of the seven Parisian stadiums which hosted the final of the Coupe de France. The others are the Parc des Princes, the Bergeyre stadium, the Pershing stadium, the Yves-du-Manoir Olympic stadium in Colombes, the Paris (Bauer) stadium in Saint-Ouen, and the Stade de France in Saint-Denis.

The only indication that the stadium once stood in this location is a commemorative plaque erected in 2018.
