= Ernest Gravier =

French footballer (1892–1965)

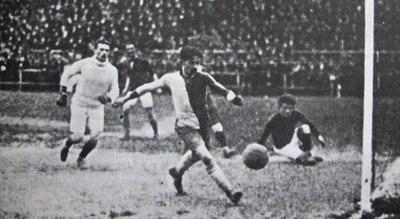

Personal information
- Date of birth: 26 August 1892
- Place of birth: Montbeugny, France
- Date of death: 14 March 1965 (aged 72)
- Place of death: Saint-Rémy-de-Provence, France

International career
Years	Team	Apps	(Gls)
- France

Ernest Gravier (26 August 1892 – 14 March 1965) was a French footballer. He competed in the men's tournament at the 1924 Summer Olympics.
