= Gaston Barreau =

French footballer (1883–1958)

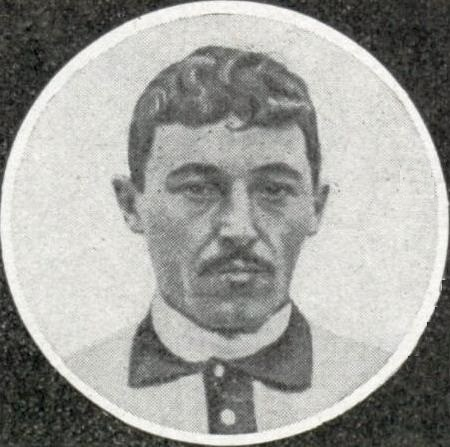
- Barreau in 1913

Personal information
- Date of birth: 7 December 1883
- Place of birth: Levallois, France
- Date of death: 11 June 1958 (aged 74)
- Place of death: Levallois, France
- Position: Midfielder

Senior career*
Years	Team	Apps	(Gls)
1898–1907	Levallois		
1907–1908	AC Standard Paris		
1908–1909	Club Français		
1909–1919	Levallois		

International career
1911–1914	France	12	(0)

Managerial career
- 1919–1945: France
- 1949–1951: France
- * Club domestic league appearances and goals

Gaston Barreau (7 December 1883 – 11 June 1958) was a French football player and coach. He played primarily for FEC Levallois, but was also honored with 12 selections in the France national team between 1911 and 1914. He played as a defender.

Barreau was known as a natural team leader. However, by nature he was reserved, almost shy. He spoke little, never gave in to a challenge, and shined above all with his humility. In his life he remained one of the most listened-to men in French football for four decades, between 1919 and 1958.

Barreau began his managing career with France in 1919, when the national team was led by a committee of managers: (Barreau, Achille Duchenne, Gabriel Jardin, and Eugène Plagnes). Unable to free himself from his obligations at the Academy of Music in July 1930, he could not accompany France in the debut edition of the World Cup. When Barreau was appointed sole coach on 24 February 1936, it was the end of the era of the managing committee.

Gaston Barreau remained the manager of the France team from 1919 to 1955. He was still serving with the staff of the "Bleus" at the time of his death in 1958, the day of the Yugoslavia-France match at the Swedish World Cup. In all, Gaston Barreau managed the France national team for 197 games.
