= Adrien Filez =

French footballer (1885–1965)

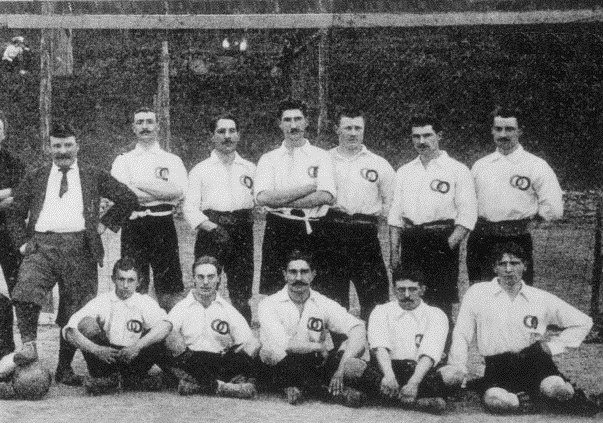

Personal information
- Full name: Augustin Hector Adrien Filez
- Date of birth: 27 August 1885
- Place of birth: Tourcoing, Nord, France
- Date of death: 15 October 1965 (aged 80)
- Place of death: Forest-sur-Marque, Nord, France
- Position: Forward

Senior career*
Years	Team	Apps	(Gls)
1903—1910	US Tourcoing		

International career
1904–1908	France	5	(0)
- * Club domestic league appearances and goals

Augustin Hector Adrien Filez, (27 August 1885 – 15 October 1965), known as Adrien Filez, was a French footballer who played as a forward.

== Career ==
Filez played for US Tourcoing and made five appearances for the France national team, including at the 1908 Olympic Games against Denmark, in which France lost 9–0. He also played in the French team's first-ever match, which was a 3–3 draw against Belgium, on 1 May 1904.

Filez was made Chevallier of the Legion d'Honneur on 20 July 1932 after being Lieutenant of the Second Artillery Mobilization Centre.

== Career statistics ==
Scores and results list France'S goal tally first, score column indicates score after each Filez goal.

List of international goals scored by Adrien Filez
No.	Date	Venue	Opponent	Score	Result	Competition	Ref.
1	1 May 1904	Stade du Vivier d'Oie, Uccle, Belgium	Belgium		3–3	Évence Coppée Trophy	
2	12 February 1905	Parc des Princes, Paris, France	Switzerland		1–0	Friendly	
3	7 May 1905	Stade du Vivier d'Oie, Uccle, Belgium	Belgium		0–7	Friendly	
4	22 April 1906	Stade de la Faisanderie, Saint-Cloud, France	Belgium		5–0	Friendly	
5	19 October 1908	White City Stadium, London, England	Denmark		0–9	1908 Olympic Games	
