= Albert Parsis =

French footballer (1890–1980)

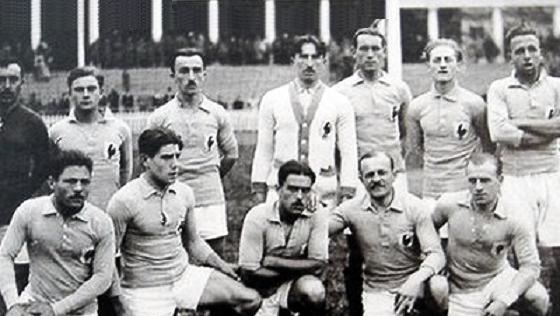

Personal information
- Date of birth: 2 June 1890
- Place of birth: Tourcoing, France
- Date of death: 24 February 1980 (aged 89)
- Place of death: Tourcoing, France

International career
Years	Team	Apps	(Gls)
- France

Albert Parsis (2 June 1890 – 24 February 1980) was a French footballer. He competed in the men's tournament at the 1920 Summer Olympics.
