= US Tourquennoise =

French football club

- Full name: Union Sportive Tourquennoise
- Nickname: Les Ustiens
- Short name: US Tourcoing
- Founded: 1902 (as US Tourcoing)
- Ground: Stade Charles Van de Veegaete
- Capacity: 4000
- Chairman: Fabien Desmet
- Manager: Yacine Itoumaine
- League: Regional 1, Hauts-de-France
- 2018–19: National 3 Group I, 13th (relegated)
- Website: ustourcoingfootball.footeo.com
colours

Union Sportive Tourquennoise, commonly shortened to US Tourcoing, is a French football club founded in 1902 and based in Tourcoing. The club played in the Championnat National 3 (and its previous incarnation at the fifth level) for five seasons since 2014–2015 after finishing first in the Division Honneur of Nord-Pas-de-Calais during the 2013–2014 season, but were relegated back to the sixth level in 2019.

== History ==
Founded on 12 May 1898, as US Tourcoing, the club played football from 1902 under the leadership of the supervisor of the Lycée Gambetta: Albert Fromentin. The colours were black and white. Champions of the USFSA du Nord in 1900, 1909, 1910 and 1912, US Tourcoing reached three times the semifinals of the Championnat de France (1900, 1909 and 1912) and won it in 1910 . In the final, they beat Stade Helvétique de Marseille 7–2 on 1 May 1910 at the Parc des Princes. The club was at its peak and many players need to be mentioned here, in particular Adrien Filez (the only provincial player to be selected in 1904 for the first game of the France national football team), Gabriel Hanot, Victor Denis and Jules Dubly.

North champions in 1920 and 1928, the Ustiens got to the semifinals of the Coupe de France in 1921. They were against the formidable Olympique de Paris and lost in the 114th minute. Always present in the Coupe de France (quarter-finalist in 1922 and 1926) or in the Championnat (Championnat du Nord in 1933), the club still provided players for the national team (Maurice Depaepe, Victor Farvacques and Jean Sécember) the club chose to have professional status in 1933. Admitted into Division 2 in the year of its creation, US Tourcoing struggled and abandoned its professional status in June 1938.

After World War II, the club was actively involved in the creation of CO Roubaix-Tourcoing. UST regained its independence in 1957. A year later, Charles Van Veegaete, co-founder of the sports club in 1898, died. The stadium was renamed the Stade Charles Van Veegaete from the Stade Albert Fromentin.

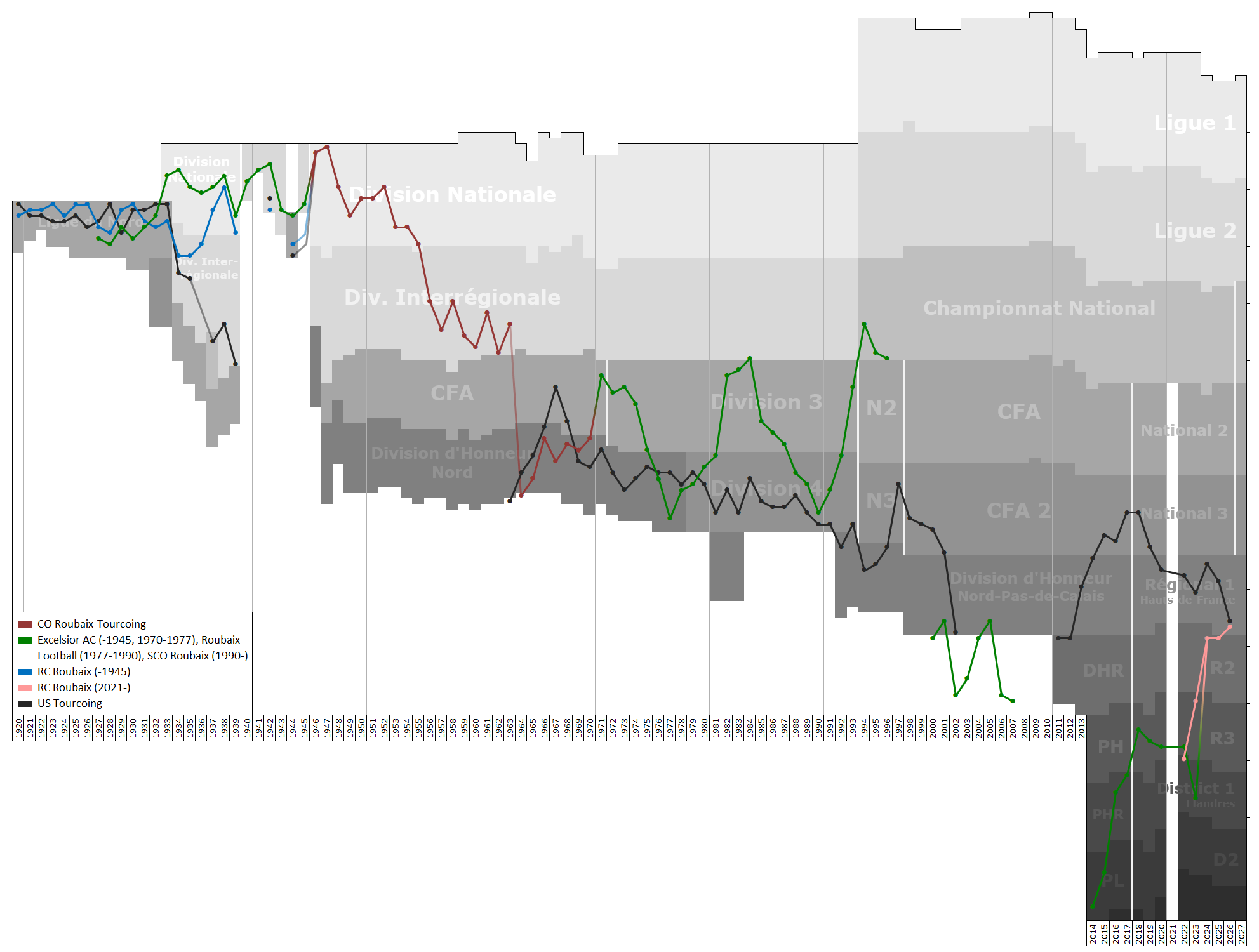
Historical league performance chart of CO Roubaix-Tourcoing and its successors

Since then, the club played simply in amateur competitions (Division 4). On 30 June 1990 the club merged with AS-Jean Mace Tourcoing (one of the best UFOLEP clubs in the region and playing in DH in 1990), to become the Tourcoing FC (TFC), playing in yellow, white and black. The founding presidents were Albert Vandenabaele (of UST) and Roger Vandepeutte (of ASJMT). The club played in the CFA2 until 2002, then experienced four consecutive relegations, finding itself playing in the regional league in 2005.

The Ivory Coast international Didier Drogba played in the youth teams of TFC, likewise with French international Yohan Cabaye, when they were ten years old. The club was renamed Union Sports Tourcoing Football Club (USTFC) in 2010. The official colours were changed back to the original ones, black and white. The current president since 2009 is Fabien Desmet. In 2014, the club returned to the CFA 2 after more than 10 years in the regional leagues.

== Players ==
=== Current squad ===
As of 29 March 2019

Note: Flags indicate national team as defined under FIFA eligibility rules; some limited exceptions apply. Players may hold more than one non-FIFA nationality.

No.	Pos.	Nation	Player
—	GK	FRA	Alexis Derville
—	GK	FRA	Samuel Reschid
—	DF	BEL	Pierre Gevaert
—	DF	FRA	Nicolas Maillet
—	DF	FRA	Nadir Touhami
—	DF	FRA	Rael Nzeza
—	DF	FRA	Samy Bouaziz
—	DF	FRA	Patrick Fradj
—	DF	FRA	Aurélien Goret
—	MF	FRA	Corentin Cottenceau
—	MF	FRA	Antoni De Geitère
—	MF	FRA	Matthieu Debisschop

No.	Pos.	Nation	Player
—	MF	SEN	Amadou Fall
—	MF	FRA	Loic Delarue
—	MF	FRA	Athman Halipre
—	MF	FRA	Sofiane Sali
—	MF	FRA	Axel Magnesse
—	MF	FRA	Gauthier Varez
—	FW	FRA	Aymeric Cottenceau
—	FW	FRA	Julien De Araujo
—	FW	FRA	Ali Sonko
—	FW	FRA	Ryan Adim
—	FW	FRA	Ismael Lounas
—	FW	FRA	Marvin Turcan

=== Professional footballers who have played for TFC or UST ===
- Yohan Cabaye
- Christophe Delmotte
- Didier Drogba
- Michael Klukowski
- J. C. Mack
- Larsen Touré
- Malik Boumendjel

== Achievements and honours ==
- Challenge International du Nord:
  - Winners: 1911, 1913
  - Finalists: 1906, 1912
- Championnat de France de l'USFSA:
  - Champions: 1909–10
- Coupe de France:
  - Semi-finals: 1921
- Championnat du Nord-Pas-de-Calais:
  - Champions: 1920, 1928, 1932, 1965, 1992, 1996, 2014
- Championnat du Nord de l'USFSA:
  - Champions: 1900, 1909, 1910, 1912
