= Gabriel Hanot =

French footballer and journalist (1889–1968)

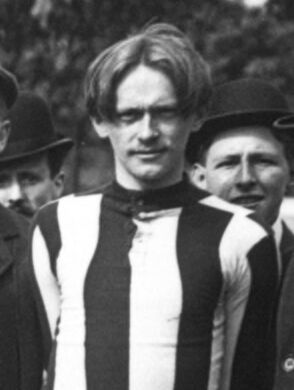
- Hanot in 1910

Personal information
- Date of birth: 6 November 1889
- Place of birth: Arras, France
- Date of death: 10 August 1968 (aged 78)
- Place of death: Wangenbourg-Engenthal, France
- Positions: Defender; winger

Senior career*
| Years | Team | Apps | (Gls) |
| 1906-1910 | US Tourcoing | | |
| 1910-1912 | Preußen Münster | | |
| 1912-1915 | US Tourcoing | | |
| 1916-1919 | AS Francilienne | | |

International career
| 1908–1919 | France | 12 | (3) |

Managerial career
- 1945–1949: France (coach under a committee)
- * Club domestic league appearances and goals

Gabriel Hanot (French pronunciation: [ɡabʁijɛl ano]; 6 November 1889 – 10 August 1968) was a French footballer, coach and journalist.

After a playing career which included 12 caps for the France national team, Hanot became a journalist and football administrator, also leading the France national team between 1945-49. His main achievements in football are the 1932 introduction of professionalism to French football; formulating the idea to create a European Cup (which has since become the UEFA Champions League); and the launching of the Ballon d'Or.

== Playing career ==
Hanot was born in Arras on 6 November 1889, and was introduced to football whilst at lycée in nearby Tourcoing. Discovering a talent for the sport, Hanot played for local side US Tourcoing, with whom he won a USFSA French title in 1910, and was selected at the age of 18 for the first time for the France national team, making a total of four appearances for the French national team in 1908 as a left winger. He was also included in France's squad for the football tournament at the 1908 Summer Olympics, but he did not play in any matches.

Hanot was not selected for France at all the following two years, and in 1910 headed to Münster (Note: There is some doubt regarding whether Hanot studied in Münster or in Berlin, though this appears to be a mistake that originates from the name of Münster's local football team: Preußen (Prussia, in English). This name would generally point to Berlin and eastern Germany in general, but is in fact also the name chosen by Münster's team, and thus appears to have led to a misconception among many sources that Hanot studied in Berlin.) to study at university, where he continued playing football for local side Preußen Münster. He returned to Tourcoing and France in 1912, where he won a Challenge International du Nord with US Tourcoing in 1913, and earned seven more caps for France, now playing as a full-back.

Hanot's footballing career was interrupted by World War I, during which he enlisted in the French army as a pilot. He was shot down and taken prisoner by the German army on three occasions, but managed to escape each time.

After the war, he played once more for France, as captain against Belgium on 9 March 1919, before his playing career was ended by a serious knee injury suffered during an aviation accident. In total, Hanot made 12 appearances for France, scoring three times.

== Post-playing career ==
Following an aviation accident in 1919, Hanot gave up football and became a journalist, initially for sporting publication Miroir des sports, for whom he covered golf and cycling, amongst other sports, before turning his focus directly back to football with L'Équipe.

In 1930, Hanot, alongside Marcel Rossini, pioneered the Concours du jeune footballeur, a series of tests for young players done before the kick-off of the final of the Coupe de France, which would help uncover talents such as Raymond Kopa, Jean-Michel Larqué and Christian Sarramagna. He is also credited with introducing professionalism to French football in France, in 1932, helping form what is now Ligue 1.

In December 1934, Hanot used the Miroir des sports, whom he was by this point the director of, to put forth the idea of a European cup contested between club teams, inspired by the recent dramatic growth of aviation. He would eventually return to this idea after the end of World War II, now alongside L'Équipe colleague Jacques Ferran, relaunching the concept in late 1954, and finally seeing the competition fully take shape in 1955 as the European Cup, now known as the UEFA Champions League.

From 1945 to 1949, Hanot coached the France national team, including at the football tournament of the 1948 Summer Olympics in London, in which France beat India in the first round, before losing to Great Britain in the quarter-finals. His tenure as national team manager came to an end when he anonymously called for his own resignation in June 1949 following a humiliating 1-5 loss to Spain, which he swiftly obliged.

In 1947, Hanot cofounded the Amicale des Educateurs de football, an association intended to promote and support football coaching, part of which involved the introduction of coaching courses.

In 1956, through his magazine France Football, Hanot created the Ballon d'Or award, a yearly award for the greatest male European footballer, voted for by journalists from across Europe. In 2007, the award was expanded to include footballers from throughout the entire world, and in 2018, the Ballon d'Or Féminin was launched to celebrate the greatest female footballer of the year.

Hanot died on the 10 August 1968 at the age of 78 in Wangenbourg-Engenthal.

== Legacy ==
Hanot was involved in several developments in association football.[2][5] Although no statues or monuments commemorate his work,[4] two initiatives associated with him remain prominent. The UEFA Champions League was inspired by his proposals,[9][10] while he helped establish the Ballon d'Or.[15]

== Honours ==
US Tourcoing

- USFSA French Championship: 1910
- Challenge International du Nord: 1913
