= 1911 UIAFA European Football Tournament squads =

The following is a list of squads for each team competing in men's football at the 1911 UIAFA European Football Tournament in Roubaix, France.

Ages as of the start of the tournament, 25 May 1911.

== Bohemia ==
Head coach: Johnny Madden (Scotland)

No.	Pos.	Player	Date of birth (age)	Caps	Club
	GK	Karel Pimmer		0	(Bohemia) Slavia Prague
	DF	Richard Veselý	18 September 1881 (aged 29)	3	(Bohemia) Slavia Prague
	DF	Miroslav Hajný		0	(Bohemia) SK Smíchov
	MF	Karel Kovařovic		0	(Bohemia) Slavia Prague
	MF	Rudolf Holý		0	(Bohemia) Slavia Prague
	MF	František Rosmaisl	25 April 1884 (aged 27)	0	(Bohemia) Slavia Prague
	MF	Emanuel Benda	2 February 1884 (aged 27)	4	(Bohemia) Slavia Prague
	FW	Otakar Bohata		0	(Bohemia) Slavia Prague
	FW	Ladislav Medek	0 December 1889 (aged 21–22)	0	(Bohemia) Slavia Prague
	FW	Václav Pilát	6 May 1888 (aged 23)	0	(Bohemia) Slavia Prague
	FW	Josef Bělka	20 February 1886 (aged 25)	4	(Bohemia) Sparta Prague
	FW	Jan Košek	18 July 1884 (aged 26)	3	(Bohemia) Slavia Prague
	FW	Miroslav Široký	21 January 1885 (aged 26)	1	(Bohemia) Slavia Prague

== England ==
Head coach:

No.	Pos.	Player	Date of birth (age)	Caps	Club
	GK	G. M. C. Taylor		0	
		J. C. D. Tetley		0	
	DF	Johnson		0	
	DF	Shetton		0	
		J. E. Hobbs		0	
		H. H. Milton		0	
		B. H. Farnfield		0	
		Y. L. Emell		0	
		C. E. Brisley		0	
	MF	E. Melliar-Smith		0	
	MF	Wilson		0	
	MF	Bryant I		0	
		A. H. Birgs		0	
	FW	Mouton King		0	
	FW	Bryant II		0	
	FW	W. H. Gardner		0	
	FW	W. Stebbing		0	
	FW	Dickson		0	

== France ==
Head coach:

No.	Pos.	Player	Date of birth (age)	Caps	Club
	GK	Guy De Gastyne		0	(France) Racing Club
	DF	Robert Diochon	9 June 1883 (aged 27)	0	(France) FC Rouen
	DF	Henri Moigneu	18 July 1884 (aged 26)	8	(France) US Tourquennoise
		Rouxel		0	(France) Stade Français
		Auguste Schalbart		0	(France) USA Clichy
		Remy		0	(France) AS Française
	DF	Gaudin		0	(France) Racing Club
		Alphonse Nicol (C)		0	(France) Racing Club
		Carlos Bacrot		0	(France) Olympique Lillois
	FW	Paul Chandelier	23 January 1892 (aged 19)	0	(France) Olympique Lillois
	FW	Albert Eloy	17 April 1892 (aged 19)	0	(France) Olympique Lillois
	FW	Raymond Dubly	5 November 1893 (aged 17)	0	(France) RC Roubaix
	FW	Émile Sartorius	11 September 1883 (aged 27)	5	(France) Racing Club
	FW	Paul Voyeux	11 April 1884 (aged 27)	0	(France) Olympique Lillois
