= Guy de Gastyne =

French footballer and art director (1888–1972)

- Born: 10 May 1888; Neuilly-sur-Seine, Hauts-de-Seine, France
- Died: 3 February 1972 (aged 83); Creteil, Val-de-Marne, France
- Occupation: Art director
- Years active: 1930–1952 (film)
Association football career
- Position: Goalkeeper
Senior career*
Years	Team	Apps	(Gls)
1911–1912	Racing Club de France		
International career
1911	France (UIAFA)	4	(0)
- * Club domestic league appearances and goals

Guy de Gastyne (French pronunciation: [ɡi də ɡastin]; 10 May 1888 – 3 February 1972) was a French art director. In his youth, he was a footballer who played as a goalkeeper for Racing Club de France and for the French national team in the 1911 UIAFA European Football Tournament at Roubaix.

He was the brother of the film director Marco de Gastyne.

== Biography ==
Guy de Gastyne was born in Neuilly-sur-Seine on 10 May 1888, and he began his football career at Racing de France in the early 1910s. On 30 April 1911, Gastyne started in the final of the 1911 USFSA Football Championship in Marseille, which ended in a 2–3 loss to Stade Helvétique de Marseille. In the preview of the 1911 Coupe Dewar final between USA Clichy and Club athlétique de Paris 14, the French newspaper L'Auto (the future L'Équipe) stated that Clichy's goalkeeper Pierre Chayriguès was the second-best in the capital after Gastyne. In the following year, on 14 April, he started in the final of the 1912 Coupe Dewar, helping his side to a 3–1 win over Club Français.

Gastyne made four unofficial appearances for France (UIAFA), being the goalkeeper of the French squad that participated in the 1911 UIAFA European Football Tournament at Roubaix, an unofficial European Championship organized by UIAFA, in which France was knocked out in the semifinals by Bohemia (1–4). He played his third match for UIAFA's France on 1 January 1912, in a friendly match against AFA's England in London, which ended in a 7–1 loss, and then played his fourth and last match in the following month, on 20 February, against Catalonia, keeping a clean-sheet in a 7–0 victory (he only had to touch the ball three times). He is thus the most capped player of UIAFA's France with four appearances, alongside club teammates, Alphonse Nicol and Auguste Schalbart, plus Carlos Bacrot and Victor Denis.

After the First World War, Gastyne became a painter, and remained so until the mid-1920s. He then developed into an art director, and his first work as such was Little Lise in 1930. His most notable works were O Silêncio é de Ouro (1947), Mataram o Pai Natal (1941), and Onde Está a Felicidade? (1934).

Gastyne died in Creteil on 3 February 1972, at the age of 83.

== Selected filmography ==
- Little Lise (1930)
- Monsieur the Duke (1931)
- Orange Blossom (1932)
- Buridan's Donkey (1932)
- Abduct Me (1932)
- Once Upon a Time (1933)
- Miquette (1934)
- I Have an Idea (1934)
- Arlette and Her Fathers (1934)
- Rothchild (1934)
- Samson (1936)
- The Lie of Nina Petrovna (1937)
- The Kiss of Fire (1937)
- The Citadel of Silence (1937)
- Rasputin (1938)
- The Shanghai Drama (1938)
- Whirlwind of Paris (1939)
- The White Slave (1939)
- The Acrobat (1941)
- Sins of Youth (1941)
- No Love Allowed (1942)
- Strangers in the House (1942)
- Love Marriage (1942)
- Cecile Is Dead (1944)
- Majestic Hotel Cellars (1945)
- As Long as I Live (1946)
- Naughty Martine (1947)
- Man About Town (1947)
- After Love (1948)
- The King (1949)
- Blonde (1950)
- The Happy Man (1950)
- Andalusia (1951)
- The Road to Damascus (1952)

== Honours ==
Racing Club de France

- USFSA Football Championship:
  - Runner-up (1): 1911
- Coupe Dewar:
  - Champions (1): 1912

== Bibliography ==
- Andrew, Dudley. Mists of Regret: Culture and Sensibility in Classic French Film. Princeton University Press, 1995.
