= Karel Pimmer =

Czech footballer

Personal information
- Position: Goalkeeper

Senior career*
Years	Team	Apps	(Gls)
1910–1913	Slavia Prague		

International career
1911	Bohemia (ČSF)	3	(0)
- * Club domestic league appearances and goals

Karel Pimmer was a Czech footballer who played as a goalkeeper for Slavia Prague and the Bohemia national team (ČSF) in the 1911 UIAFA European Football Tournament at Roubaix.

== Biography ==
Between 1910 and 1913, Pimmer was a member of Slavia Prague, the country's leading team, helping his side win back-to-back Charity Cup titles, beating AFK Kolín 4–1 in the 1911 final and beating FC Viktoria 4–3 in the 1912 final on 26 May. On 17 September, Pimmer was one of the eleven footballers who played in Slavia's first-ever match in the newly-founded Bohemian championship, keeping a clean-sheet in a 3–0 win over Olympia. In the following year, in 1913, Pimmer helped Slavia win its first championship title, doing so with seven wins and one defeat.

On 28 October, Pimmer played for the representative team of ČSF in a friendly matches against England amateurs, which ended in a 2–1 loss. In May 1911, Pimmer participated in the 1911 UIAFA European Football Tournament at Roubaix, an unofficial European Championship organized by UIAFA, as a member of the Bohemian team (ČSF), which was made up largely of players from Slavia and coached by Johnny Madden. In the build-up for the tournament, Pimmer helped Bohemia/Slavia win a few friendly matches against British clubs, such as Aberdeen (3–2), Ipswich Town (4–0), and Eastbourne Town (5–4). In the tournament, Pimmer helped Bohemia beat Belgium 6–1 on 25 May; USFSA's France 4–1 in the semifinals on 28 May, and then AFA's England 2–1 in the final on 29 May, saving a 83rd-minute penalty kick after Coach Madden shouted to him "BE CALM!"; thus contributing decisively in Bohemia's triumphant campaign. The French newspaper L'Auto spelled his name as "Plunner Karol".

== Honours ==
Slavia Prague

- Bohemian championship: 1913
- Charity Cup: 1911, 1912

Bohemia

- UIAFA European Tournament: 1911
