= Miroslav Široký =

Czech footballer (1885–1972)

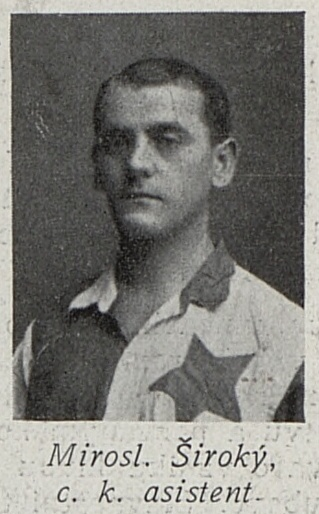
- Miroslav Široký in 1913

Personal information
- Date of birth: 21 January 1885
- Place of birth: Prague, Austria-Hungary
- Date of death: 8 October 1972 (aged 88)
- Position: Forward

Senior career*
Years	Team	Apps	(Gls)
1903–1906	Sparta Prague		
1906–1913	Slavia Prague	412	(3)
1913–1914	Viktoria Žižkov		

International career
1908	Bohemia	1	(0)
1911	Bohemia (ČSF)	3	(0)
- * Club domestic league appearances and goals

Miroslav Široký (21 January 1885 – 8 October 1972) was a Czech footballer who played as a forward for Slavia Prague between 1906 and 1913. He also played one match for the Bohemia national team in 1908.

== Club career ==
Born in Prague on 21 January 1885, Široký began his career at his hometown club Sparta Prague in 1903, aged 18, with whom he played for three years, until 1906, when he joined Slavia Prague, the country's leading team.

In the early 1910s, Široký was a member of the Slavia Prague team that won a three-peat of Charity Cups between 1910 and 1912, beating SK Smíchov 5–2 in the 1910 final, beating AFK Kolín 4–1 in the 1911 final, and scoring a goal in the 1912 final on 26 May to help his side to a 4–3 victory over FC Viktoria. On 17 September 1912, he started in Slavia's first-ever match in the newly-founded Bohemian championship, keeping a clean-sheet in a 3–0 win over Olympia.

In 1913, Široký joined Viktoria Žižkov, where he retired in 1914, aged 29. In November 1913, he was still among the players with the most goals scored for Slavia Prague's first team. Outside football, he worked as a civil servant.

== International career ==
On 13 June 1908, the 23-year-old Široký earned his first (and only) international cap for Bohemia, a friendly against England, which ended in a 4–0 loss.

Three years later, in May 1911, Široký participated in the 1911 UIAFA European Football Tournament at Roubaix, an unofficial European Championship organized by UIAFA, as a member of the Bohemian team (ČSF), which was made up largely of players from Slavia and coached by Johnny Madden. In the build-up for the tournament, he helped Bohemia/Slavia win a few friendly matches against British clubs, such as Aberdeen (3–2), Ipswich Town (4–0), and Eastbourne Town (5–4). In the tournament, Široký helped Bohemia beat Belgium 6–1 on 25 May; USFSA's France 4–1 in the semifinals on 28 May, and then AFA's England 2–1 in the final on 29 May. The French newspaper L'Auto spelled his name as "M. Sicoky".

== Honours ==
Slavia Prague

- Charity Cup: 1910, 1911, 1912

Bohemia

- UIAFA European Tournament: 1911
