= Richard Veselý =

Czech footballer

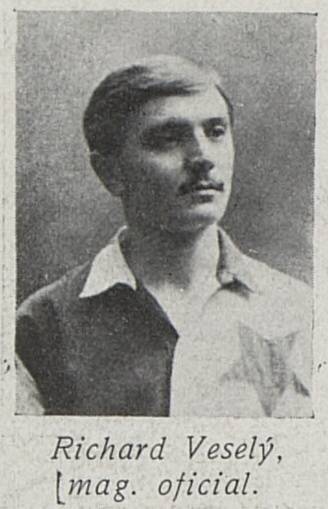
- Richard Veselý

Personal information
- Full name: Richard Veselý
- Date of birth: 18 September 1881
- Place of birth: Prague, Austria-Hungary
- Position: Defender

Senior career*
Years	Team	Apps	(Gls)
1901–1919	Slavia Prague	412	(3)

International career
1906–1908	Bohemia	3	(0)
1911	Bohemia (ČSF)	3	(0)
- * Club domestic league appearances and goals

Richard Veselý (18 September 1881 – unknown) was a Czech footballer who played as a defender for Slavia Prague and the Bohemian national team.

== Club career ==
Veselý was born in Prague on 18 September 1881, and he became an undisputed starter of Slavia Prague, the country's leading team, around 1901, aged 20. He was noted for his fighting qualities and tireless energy. Due to his leadership qualities, he soon received the status of captain in the club. His longtime partner in the team's defense line was Rudolf Krummer. At that time, the club mainly played friendly matches with the leading teams of Central and Northern Europe, regularly winning.

Between 1905 and 1907, Veselý was the captain of the Slavia team that was considered one of the strongest in continental Europe after achieving many international victories, including over Austrian teams Wiener AC (4–3, 4–0), First Vienna (2–0, 1–0) and Vienna Cricket (1–0), the Danish club Boldklubben af 1893 (4–2), and Belgian club Union Saint-Gilloise. In a match against the Pilgrims on 25 April 1906, Veselý scored Slavia's first goal in the 60th minute with a long shot from his own half to rally his side to a 3–2 comeback victory. In the following month, on 19 May, Veselý captained Slavia to their first-ever win over the English professional team Southampton, and also drew with the champion of Scotland Celtic (3–3). Slavia finished the year of 1906 with 39 wins out of 48 matches played and with 340 goals scored against 62.

In 1910, Vesely, a tireless fighter with inexhaustible energy, played his 300th match as part of Slavia, and on the occasion of such an anniversary, the Czech press stated that "he is almost thirty years old, likes to cultivate physical exercise and can be an example to twenty-four-year-olds".

In the early 1910s, Veselý was a member of the Slavia Prague team that won a three-peat of Charity Cups between 1910 and 1912, beating SK Smíchov 5–2 in the 1910 final, beating AFK Kolín 4–1 in the 1911 final and beating FC Viktoria 4–3 in the 1912 final on 26 May, although he did not play in the latter final. On 17 September, Veselý was involved in Slavia's first-ever match in the newly-founded Bohemian championship, keeping a clean-sheet in a 3–0 win over Olympia. In the following year, in 1913, the 32-year-old Veselý helped Slavia win its first championship title, doing so with seven wins and one defeat.

Veselý retired from football shortly after, although he occasionally appeared on the field for quite some time, with the last such documented match taking place in 1919, in a Czechoslovak championship match against the club "Meteor VIII" (5–0). Between 1901 and 1915, Veselý played a total of 412 matches for Slavia, scoring three goals.

== International career ==
Between 1906 and 1908, Veselý earned three international caps for Bohemia, all of which in friendlies, two against Hungary and one against England, registering a record of two losses and one draw.

In May 1911, Veselý participated in the 1911 UIAFA European Football Tournament at Roubaix, an unofficial European Championship organized by UIAFA, as a member of the Bohemian team (ČSF), which was made up largely of players from Slavia and coached by Johnny Madden.< In the build-up for the tournament, Pimmer helped Bohemia/Slavia win a few friendly matches against British clubs, such as Aberdeen (3–2), Ipswich Town (4–0), and Eastbourne Town (5–4). In the tournament, Pimmer helped Bohemia beat Belgium 6–1 on 25 May; USFSA's France 4–1 in the semifinals on 28 May, and then AFA's England 2–1 in the final on 29 May, saving a 83rd-minute penalty kick after Coach Madden shouted to him "BE CALM!"; thus contributing decisively in Bohemia's triumphant campaign. The French newspaper L'Auto spelled his name as "Vesely Rich".

== Honours ==
=== Club ===
Slavia Prague

- Bohemian championship:
  - Champions (1): 1913
- Charity Cup:
  - Champions (3): 1910, 1911, and 1912

=== International ===
Bohemia

- UIAFA European Tournament:
  - Champions (1): 1911
