= Miroslav Hajný =

Czech footballer

Personal information
- Date of birth: 3 January 1886
- Place of birth: Beroun, Austria-Hungary
- Position: Defender

Senior career*
Years	Team	Apps	(Gls)
1908–1912	SK Smíchov		
1912–1914	Slavia Prague		

International career
1911	Bohemia (ČSF)	3	(0)
- * Club domestic league appearances and goals

Miroslav Hajný (3 January 1886 – unknown) was a Czech footballer who played as a defender for Slavia Prague in the early 1910s.

== Playing career ==
Born in Beroun on 3 January 1886, Hajný began his career at SK Smíchov, from which he joined Slavia Prague, the country's leading team, helping his side win the Charity Cup title in the 1912, beating FC Viktoria 4–3 in the final on 26 May. On 17 September, Pimmer was one of the eleven footballers who played in Slavia's first-ever match in the newly-founded Bohemian championship, keeping a clean-sheet in a 3–0 win over Olympia. The following year, in 1913, Pimmer helped Slavia win its first championship title, doing so with seven wins and one defeat.

In May 1911, Hajný participated in the 1911 UIAFA European Football Tournament at Roubaix, an unofficial European Championship organized by UIAFA, as a member of the Bohemian team (ČSF), which was made up largely of players from Slavia and coached by Johnny Madden. In the tournament, he helped Bohemia beat Belgium 6–1 on 25 May; USFSA's France 4–1 in the semifinals on 28 May, and then AFA's England 2–1 in the final on 29 May. The French newspaper L'Auto spelled his name as "M. Kajny".

== Military career ==
Having graduated from the Prague Cadet School, Hajný was assigned to the 40th Infantry Regiment in Rzeszów in 1905. Like so many others, he was mobilized at the outbreak of the First World War, but was declared politically unreliable. Following a super-arbitration in January 1918, he entered the service of the Maffia. A few months later, on 22 August 1918, he married in the Basilica of St. Ludmila in Vinohrady, being described as a "super-arb, without assignment".

== Honours ==
=== Club ===
Slavia Prague

- Bohemian championship:
  - Champions (1): 1913
- Charity Cup:
  - Champions (1): 1912

=== International ===
Bohemia

- UIAFA European Tournament:
  - Champions (1): 1911
