= Auguste Schalbart =

French footballer (1889–1952)

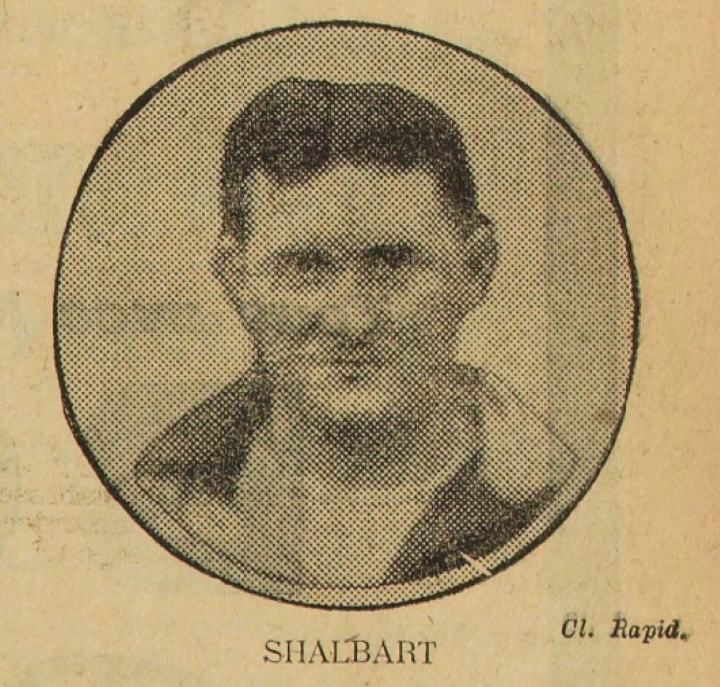
- Schalbart in 1912

Personal information
- Date of birth: 11 July 1889
- Place of birth: Levallois-Perret, France
- Date of death: 1952 (aged 62-63)
- Height: 1.61 m (5 ft 3 in)
- Position: Defender

Senior career*
| Years | Team | Apps | (Gls) |
| 1908–1909 | Stade Français | | |
| 1909–1911 | USA Clichy | | |
| 1911–? | Racing Club de France | | |
| 1935–1936 | FC Nancy | 3 | (0) |

International career
| 1908 | France B | 0 | (0) |
| 1911–1912 | France (UIAFA) | 4 | (0) |
| 1913 | Northern France | 1 | (0) |

Managerial career
- 1935–1936: FC Nancy
- * Club domestic league appearances and goals

Auguste Schalbart, sometimes misspelled as Schalbar (11 July 1889 – 1952), and nicknamed "Napoleon", was a French footballer who played as a defender for USA Clichy and the French national team in the 1911 UIAFA European Football Tournament at Roubaix.

He later co-founded FC Nancy on 20 May 1935.

== Club career ==
Auguste Schalbart was born in Levallois-Perret on 11 July 1889. He was a versatility footballer who could play in all positions, including as a backup goalkeeper.

In 1911, Schalbart helped USA Clichy reach the final of the Coupe Dewar at Colombes on 21 May, and in the preview of the final, the French newspaper L'Auto (the future L'Équipe) stated that "Schalbar and Vicentini form a defense of rare safety", and in front of goalkeeper Pierre Chayriguès. And likewise, they managed to keep a clean-sheet for 90 minutes in an eventual loss in extra-time (1–0) to Club athlétique de Paris 14. According to the USA Clichy website, both "Schalbar" and Chayriguès were future internationals who began their careers with them; along with Georges Stuttler, Georges Moreel, Ernest Vaast, André Grillon.

At the end of the season, Schalbart moved to Racing Club de France, and in his first season at the club, he helped Racing reach the final of the 1912 Coupe Dewar at Colombes on 14 April 1912, in which he was quick and skillful. Schalbar scored the opening goal of the match in an eventual 3–1 win over Club Français; his teammate Henri Bard hit the woodwork, but "Schalbar appeared just in time to score with a magnificent header".

== International career ==
In 1908, Schalbart was selected as a reserve for the French B squad that was going to compete in the football tournament of the 1908 Olympic Games, but he ended up not traveling to London. In the official report of the Olympic Games, he appears as "L. Schalbart", a midfielder of Stade Français.

A few years later, in 1913 and 1914, Schalbart was once again selected as a reserve for the French national team in four matches, remaining an unused substitute in all of them, thus never becoming an international. He did, however, claim four unofficial caps for France (UIAFA), including two against England AFA, first in Paris on 23 March 1911 (3–1 loss), and then in London on 1 January 1912 (7–1 loss). He was a member of the French squad that participated in the 1911 UIAFA European Football Tournament at Roubaix, an unofficial European Championship organized by UIAFA, in which France was knocked out in the semifinals by Bohemia (4–1 loss). At the time of this tournament, he was a player of USA Clichy. He played his fourth and last match for UIAFA's France on 20 February, in a friendly match against Catalonia, helping his side to keep a clean-sheet in a 7–0 victory; he made some good clearances, but he also made some big mistakes, with the French press noting that "he often seemed to be having fun". He is thus the most capped player of UIAFA's France with four appearances, alongside club teammates, Alphonse Nicol and Guy de Gastyne, plus Carlos Bacrot and Victor Denis.

On 1 November 1913, Schalbart started as a forward for the Northern France team in a friendly against English Wanderers, which ended in a 4–1 loss.

After the First World War, Schalbart became a hotelier in Lorraine.

== Later life ==
In the spring of 1935, the Stade Universitaire Lorrain (SUL) was still only playing in the Promotion d'Honneur, much to the despair of its supporters. Schalbart, then a café owner in Lunéville, and Georges Bouillet, then campaigned to create a professional section within the SUL, and after many difficulties, their application was finally accepted on 20 May 1935. Nancy was, therefore, able to field a professional team for the 1935–36 season, with the name "Football Club de Nancy".

Schalbart became the team's coach while Bouillet was elected as the club's president, and under their supervision, the club then made its debut in Division 2, where it finished 17th out of 19, scoring 33 goals and conceding 122. The first point was only obtained in the evening of the 11th matchday, at home against Montpellier (2–2), and during a trip to Caen on 17 November 1935, the 46-year-old Schalbart even volunteered to play goalkeeper, conceding nine goals. He then become a player-coach as he featured in a further two matches for Nancy as a defender, against Amiens SC on 16 February 1936 and against Montpellier on 26 April, losing both games (6–1 and 2–0, respectively). He was eventually replaced as coach by Austrian Karl Heinlein.

== Honours ==
USA Clichy

- Coupe Dewar runner-up: 1911

Racing Club de France

- Coupe Dewar: 1912
