= Carlos Bacrot =

French footballer (1895–1976)

Personal information
- Full name: Carlos Henri Bacrot
- Date of birth: 17 April 1895
- Place of birth: Carnin, Nord, France
- Date of death: 31 May 1976 (aged 81)
- Place of death: Doullens, Somme, France
- Position: Forward

Senior career*
Years	Team	Apps	(Gls)
1911–1912	Olympique Lillois		

International career
1911–1912	France (UIAFA)	4	(2)
- * Club domestic league appearances and goals

Carlos Henri Bacrot (17 April 1895 – 31 May 1976) was a French footballer who played as a forward for Olympique Lillois and of the French national team in the 1911 UIAFA European Football Tournament at Roubaix.

== Career ==
Carlos Bacrot was born in Lille, Nord, on 17 April 1895. He then joined the ranks of Olympique Lillois in 1910, aged 15, and on 19 February 1911, he scored the third and final goal from a corner to seal a 3–0 win over RC Roubaix, thus contributing decisively in helping the club clinch the 1911 USFSA Northern Championship, which was the very first title in the club's history.

Bacrot made four unofficial appearances for France (UIAFA), including two against England AFA, first in Paris on 23 March 1911 (3–1 loss), and then in London on 1 January 1912 (7–1 loss). He was a member of the French squad that participated in the 1911 UIAFA European Football Tournament at Roubaix, an unofficial European Championship organized by UIAFA, in which France was knocked out in the semifinals by Bohemia (1–4). He played his fourth and last match for UIAFA's France on 20 February, in a friendly match against Catalonia, scoring twice to help his side to a 7–0 victory, on both occasions from corners. He is thus the most capped player of UIAFA's France with four appearances, alongside captain Alphonse Nicol, goalkeeper Guy de Gastyne, Auguste Schalbart, and Victor Denis, as well as its top scorer with two goals, alongside René Bagnol, Auguste Trousselier, and club teammate Albert Eloy.

== Later life and death ==
After the First World War, Bacrot became a director of a real estate agency in the suburbs of Lille.

Bacrot died in Doullens, Somme, on 31 May 1976, at the age of 81.

== Honours ==
Olympique Lillois

- USFSA Football Northern Championship: 1911
