= 1949 Coupe de France final =

- Event: 1948–49 Coupe de France
RC Paris	Lille
5	2
- Date: 8 May 1949
- Venue: Olympique Yves-du-Manoir, Colombes
- Referee: Raymond Vincenti
- Attendance: 61,473

The 1949 Coupe de France final was a football match held at Stade Olympique Yves-du-Manoir, Colombes on 8 May 1949, that saw RC Paris defeat Lille OSC 5–2 thanks to goals by Roger Gabet (2), Roger Quenolle and Ernest Vaast.

== Match details ==
8 May 1949

RC Paris	5–2	Lille
Gabet 28', 35'; Quenolle 30'; Vaast 52'; Jadrejak 59' (o.g.)	Report	Lechantre 74'; Strappe 83'

Stade Olympique Yves-du-Manoir, Colombes
Attendance: 61,473
Referee: Raymond Vincenti

GK	(France) René Vignal
DF	(Soviet Union) Kārlis Ārens
DF	(France) Marcel Salva
DF	(Italy) Angelo Grizzetti
DF	(France) Roger Lamy
MF	(France) Lucien Leduc	(c)
MF	(France) Roger Gabet
FW	(France) Henri Tessier
FW	(France) Roger Quenolle
FW	(France) Ernest Vaast
FW	(France) Georges Moreel
Manager:
(France) Paul Baron Assistant Referees: Fourth Official:

GK	(France) Félix Witkowski
DF	(France) Joseph Jadrejak
DF	(France) Justo Nuevo
DF	(France) Albert Dubreucq
DF	(France) Jean-Marie Prevost
MF	(France) Roger Carré
MF	(France) Maryan Walter
FW	(France) Roger Vandooren
FW	(France) Jean Baratte	(c)
FW	(France) André Strappe
FW	(France) Jean Lechantre
Manager:
(France) André Cheuva

== See also ==
- 1948–49 Coupe de France
