= Bohemia and Moravia national football team =

Football team in Austria-Hungary

Bohemia and Moravia football team
- Association: Czech Football Association (ancestor of Football Association of the Czech Republic)
- Confederation: FIFA (1906) UIAFA (1911)
- Head coach: Johnny Madden 1911–1919
- Captain: Emanuel Benda (1908)
- Top scorer: Jan Košek
- Home stadium: Stadion Slavii (1903–1908); Stadion Letná (1939)

First international
- 5 April 1903 (1–2, Hungary)

Last international
- 12 November 1939 (4–4, Germany)

The Bohemia and Moravia football team was the selection of the best Bohemian and Moravian players representing this region of Austria-Hungary in men's Association football matches. It was established in 1903 and disbanded in 1911. It was temporarily revived in 1939, under the name of the Bohemian-Moravian team during the creation of the Protectorate of Bohemia-Moravia by the Nazis.

Created following the popularization of association football in Central Europe, the Bohemian-Moravian team played its first match in 1903 against Hungary. The Bohemian federation joined FIFA in 1906, and the national team increased its matches, notably against its Hungarian neighbor. The team also faced England in 1908. Rejected from FIFA, the team was a founding member of the UIAFA, a competing association of which it won the 1911 European Tournament, but did not participate in the 1908 and 1912 Olympic Games. The team completely disappeared due to World War I.

In 1919, the Czechoslovakia team succeeded the Bohemia and Moravia team. This notably reached a World Cup final in 1934. In 1939, Czechoslovakia was dissolved and divided into several states, including the Germany controlled of Protectorate of Bohemia-Moravia. The team was thus recreated and played three matches in 1939. The Czechoslovakia team was re-established after the war and reached the World Cup final again in 1962 then won the European championship title in 1976. Since 1993, the Czech team has represented a territory approximately corresponding to Bohemia-Moravia.

== History ==
=== Genesis of football in Bohemia and Moravia ===
The Kingdom of Bohemia, Habsburg land since the proclamation of Francis I of Austria as "emperor of Austria and king of Bohemia and Hungary" in 1804, (Note: The first Habsburg to reign over Bohemia was Albert II of the Holy Empire in the 14th century.) integrated in 1867 the new empire of Austria-Hungary in within Cisleithania.

Football appeared in Central Europe and Austria-Hungary at the end of the 19th century notably in Prague, which had many students. The organization of the first match in this city and in the entire country is dated 1892. The first clubs, SK Slavia Prague and AC Sparta Prague were founded in 1892 and 1895 then, from 1896, the first version of the Bohemian and Moravian championship was set up. In addition, although located on Bohemian territory, DFC Prague adheres to the German federation because it was founded by students from this country.

=== Creation of the first Bohemian and Moravia team (1903–1911) ===
On 19 October 1901, thirteen clubs founded the Český svaz footballový (ČSF) in English: “Czech Football Association”, the ancestor of the current Czech Federation. A team from Bohemia and Moravia was set up from 1903 to play friendly matches, particularly against Hungarian neighbors. She lost her first match 2 to 1 in 1903. However, this first match of the selection cannot be considered as an international A match, since certain "bohemian" players were in reality German or Austrian.

Between 1903 and 1908, the Magyar and Bohemian selections faced each other six times. The teams drew their two meetings in 1906. In 1907, Hungary won 5–2: coming directly from the station to Millenáris Sporttelep just before kick-off, the Hungarians considered the Bohemian-Moravians as "arrogant" and beat them by three goals, despite a score 2–1 at half-time in favor of the Bohemians. In the next match, Bohemia took revenge at home and won 5–3, which was the first victory for the team. The following year, the team was again defeated by the Magyars (5–2) and met the England team in Prague, in the middle of a continental tour. At a level much higher than that of the Bohemian-Moravians, the Three Lions won 4–0 in front of 12,000 spectators.

In 1906, the Czech Football Association applied to join the International Association Football Federation. Membership was accepted and thus, from 1906 to 1908, FIFA recognized the Bohemian-Moravian federation. However, the legitimacy of this federation is questioned because Bohemia is only a region of the Austro-Hungarian Empire (within Cisleithania), which does not constitute an official country. Also, after protest from the Austrians, the Bohemian-Moravian membership was canceled during the Congress of Vienna in June 1908.

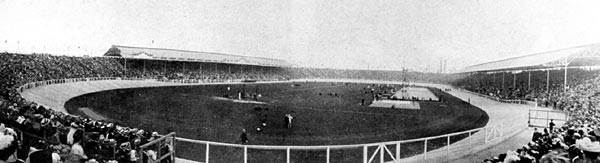
The Olympic Stadium, where Bohemia and Moravia were to play France in 1908.

Subsequently, the national team stops its activities. She was due to participate in the 1908 Olympic Games in London, but had to withdraw, as did Hungary, due to "political unrest in the Balkans" (linked to the annexation of Bosnia and Herzegovina by Austria-Hungary). The match scheduled against the France team on 19 October 1908 on behalf of the quarter-finals of the Olympic Games is thus never played. In December 1908, following the rejection of the FIFA federation, a counter-federation was founded but did not play any international matches, leaving the present federation to continue.

In October 1909, the Bohemian and Moravian team toured matches against French clubs, with a selection of sixteen players. On 2 October, the Bohemian-Moravian selection largely won against Olympique Lille (15–4). On 3 October, the Bohemia and Moravia team played for the first time in the Paris region, against CA Paris, recently crowned champions of Paris, at the Charentonneau stadium. The leaders of the Parisian club themselves invited the Bohemian-Moravian selection to play at their home. Finally winning with a score of 4–2, the French journalists from "L'Auto" described the Czechs game as "that of English professionals, slow, precise, the players positioning themselves well, a head game giving satisfactory results".

Bohemia was subsequently a founding member of the Union Internationale Amateur de Football Association (UIAFA), an association competing with FIFA bringing together French and English organizations in particular. The UIAFA was behind the organization of the European Nations Football Championship in 1911. This championship, called the "Grand European Association Football Tournament", takes place on the sidelines of the International Exhibition of the North of France in Roubaix and sees the coronation of the Bohemian team in front of around 4,000 spectators, victorious in selections representing the France (4–1) (Note: This is not the "official" selection, but a selection of players from the north of France, many of whom come from the Racing Club de Roubaix.) and England (Note: This is not the "official" selection, but a selection of amateur English players.)(2–1). In the final, Bohemia defeated England, the dominant nation at the time, after the decisive changes made by coach Johnny Madden: leading 2 to 1, England placed seven attackers on the field, but Madden responded with a "4–3–3" tactical arrangement that the British attack was unable to beat.

Building on this success, the federation applied to participate in the 1912 Olympic Games in Stockholm, but it was rejected by FIFA because "only nations and associations affiliated with the International Federation of Association Football were authorized to register teams". In the context of World War I, the Austro-Hungarian authorities banned the matches, before completely dissolving the Bohemian federation in 1916.

After the end of World War I, Bohemia-Moravia was integrated into the new Czechoslovakia and the Czechoslovak selection played its first matches in 1919 during the Inter-Allied Games then officially, during the 1920 Olympic Games with the Czechoslovakia team of football. Bohemia's record in seven matches is one victory, two draws and four defeats.

The selection of Czechoslovakia therefore took over from 1920 to 1938, and notably played a final during the 1934 Football World Cup.

=== Dismemberment of Czechoslovakia and recreation of a Bohemian-Moravian team (1939) ===
In 1939, the Third Reich invaded Czechoslovak territory. Czechoslovakia is divided between the protectorate of Bohemia and Moravia and the Slovak Republic which also has its own team, participating in sixteen matches between 1939 and 1945. The reconstituted Bohemian-Moravian team played three matches in 1939, before definitively stopping all activity. During these three matches played by the selection, the team dominated Yugoslavia 7–3, then drew against a selection from Ostmark (which brings together certain players from the former Austrian team) with a score of 5–5 in unofficial friendly matches, and achieved a feat by drawing against Germany 4 to 4, a friendly match recognized by FIFA, which then included former players of the Austrian Wunderteam forced by the regime to join the German selection after Anschluss.

After the end of World War II, the Czechoslovakia team returned to the field until the dissolution of the country in 1993, where it completed the qualifiers for the 1994 World Cup under the banner of the Rally of Czechs and Slovaks, before to give way in 1994 to the Czech team, its main heir, on the one hand, and the Slovak team on the other. Furthermore, shortly after the partition of Czechoslovakia, the new Czech football federation was originally named "Bohemian-Moravian Football Federation" (Českomoravský fotbalový svaz).

== Historical personalities ==
=== Players ===
From 1903 to 1908, the Bohemian-Moravian team used five goalkeepers. If Eisenstein plays the first match in 1903, Jan Pech plays the first match of the year 1906, Miloslav Jeník participates in two matches (including that against England in 1908), Zdeněk Richter plays the matches of the year 1907 and Václav Titl plays in 1908. During his 1939 matches under the name Bohemia-Moravia, three different goalkeepers were called up for the three matches (Vojtěch Věchet, Jaroslav Kraus and Karel Burkert).

During this period, many players, such as midfielder Josef Bělka, defender Emanuel Benda or striker Jan Košek played for Slavia Prague. Karel Kotouč and Jan Starý, also from Slavia, honor three selections between 1906 and 1908. Thus, during the match against England in 1908, all the Bohemian players came from Slavia Prague.

Jan Košek is the team's top scorer with seven goals scored in six matches, including four in the 5–3 victory over Hungary inoctobre 1907, match during which he was captain (some sources say that he only scored three goals during this match). Defender Emanuel Benda made six caps during his career and was notably the captain of the Bohemian-Moravian team against England in 1908. Midfielder Josef Bělka is one of the team's greatest scorers, with six goals scored in three braces, two in friendly matches, and a third in the final of the 1911 Grand European Tournament.

In 1939, Bohemia-Moravia recovered the best elements of Czechoslovakia, including winger Antonín Puč, Oldřich Nejedlý, top scorer in the 1934 World Cup and striker Josef Bican, who scored six goals with the selection during matches against Ostmark and Germany.

=== Selectors ===
During matches of the Bohemian-Moravian team in the 1900s, the selection is led by a selection committee. Thus, it is a small group of people who choose the players and not a single selector. During the UIAFA "Grand European Association Football Tournament" of 1911, it was the Scotsman John William Madden, already coach of Slavia Prague and main member of the selection committee in 1908, who led the Bohemian team.

In 1939, František Blažej led the Bohemian-Moravian selection and remained undefeated with one victory and two draws in three matches. Although it was his first and only experience as a coach, Blažej later became the president of the Czechoslovak football federation in the mid-1950s.

== Infrastructure ==
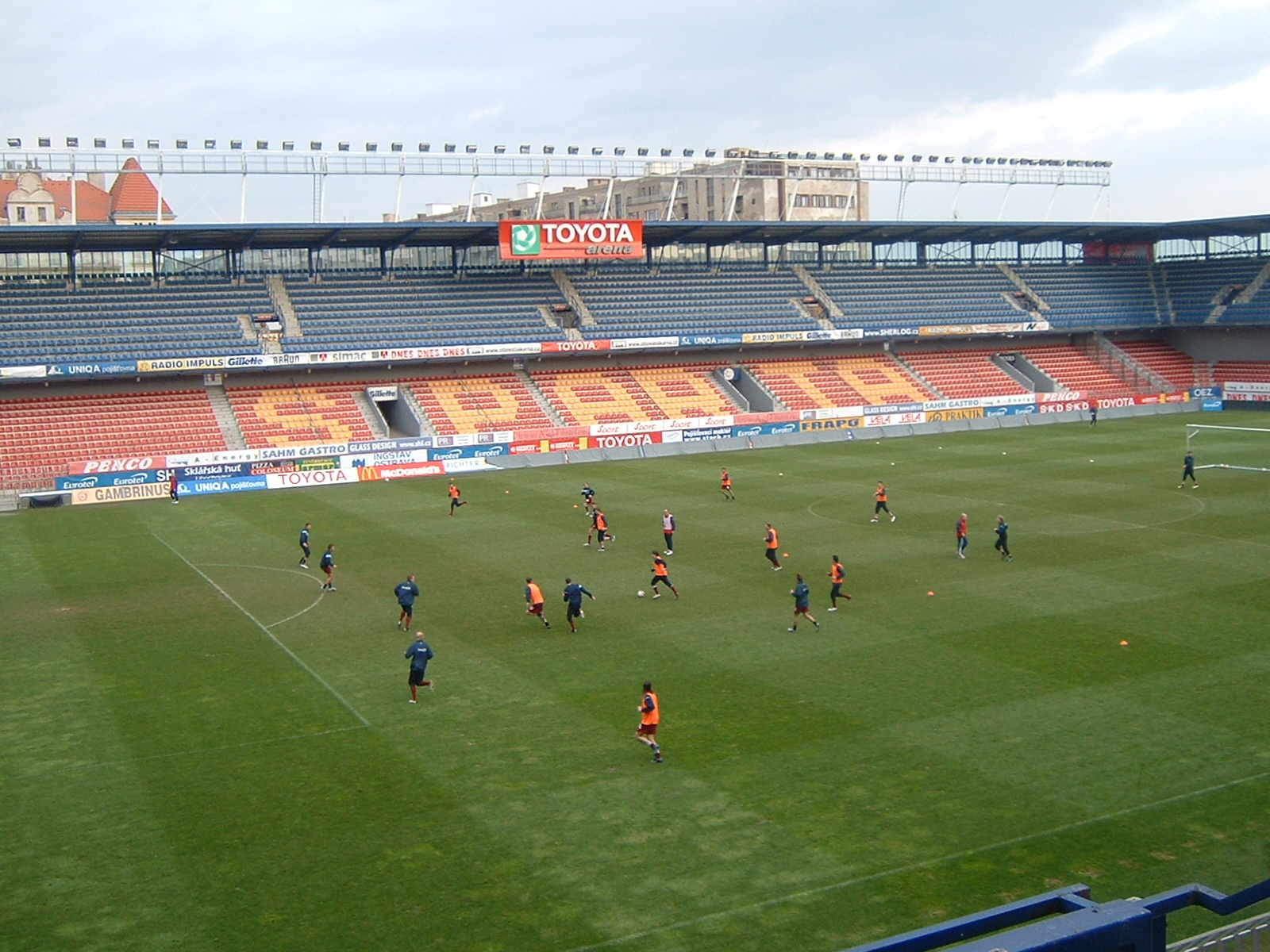
Prague's Stadion Letná, 2005.

During its home matches in the 1900s, the national team played at the Stadion Slavii, in Prague, the country's capital. Built in 1901, it later hosted some Czechoslovakia matches between 1923 and 1934. During home matches in 1939, the Bohemian team used Stadion Letná. Opened to the public in 1921, it hosted most of the matches of the selection of Czechoslovakia, then of the Czech Republic.

== Results and statistics ==
=== Results ===
The Bohemia and Moravia team, both in its version of the 1900s and in that of 1939, only played friendly matches, with the exception of the UIAFA Grand International Association Football Tournament. She has never competed in the Summer Olympics or the World cup. Its most frequent opponent is Hungary, which it faces six times over the period 1903–1908.

The table below lists all the matches played by the Bohemia and Moravia selection:

List of matches of the Bohemia and Moravia football team
#	Date	Place	Opponent	Score	Competition	Scorers for Bohemia and Moravia
	5 April 1903	Budapest	Hungary	2–1	Friendly (unofficial)	Rezek 9th
1	1 April 1906	Budapest	Hungary	1–1	Friendly	Valášek 56th
2	7 October 1906	Prague	Hungary	4–4	Friendly	Jan Starý 22nd, 83rd Košek 65th, 88th
3	7 April 1907	Budapest	Hungary	5–2	Friendly	Jelínek-Milka 37thPelikán 13rd
4	6 October 1907	Prague	Hungary	5–3	Friendly	Košek 8th, 40th, 65th, 86th Bělka 88th
5	5 April 1908	Budapest	Hungary	5–2	Friendly	Bělka 58th Malý 75th
6	13 June 1908	Prague	England	0–4	Friendly	–
	16 October 1910	Saint Petersburg	Russia	5–4	Friendly (unofficial)	?
	23 October 1910	Moscow	Russia	1–0	Friendly (unofficial)	–
	28 May 1911	Roubaix	France	4–1	Grand European Tournament Semi-final	Bělka 15th, Košek, Medek
	28 May 1911	Roubaix	England	2–1	Grand European Tournament Final	Bělka
	27 August 1939	Prague	Yugoslavia	7–3	Friendly (unofficial)	Kopecký 10th, 47th, 55th Ludl 18th, 80th Říha 37th Nejedlý 77th
	22 October 1939	Prague	Austria	5–5	Friendly (unofficial)	Čepelák 25th Ludl 53rd Bican 60th, 65th, 69th
7	12 November 1939	Wrocław	Germany	4–4	Friendly	Bican 8th, 13th, 40th Puč 7th

=== Sports report ===
The Bohemia and Moravia team was active over two periods: from 1903 to 1911, then in 1939. It mainly plays friendly matches as well as the UIAFA Grand International Association Football Tournament, on the sidelines of the 1911 Exhibition in Roubaix. It was during this competition that she won her only international title, Bohemia and Moravia being the only UIAFA European champion to have been crowned.

Over the period 1903–1911, Bohemia and Moravia played nine matches, seven of which were friendly. She won three, drew two and lost four times. In 1939, she played three matches, including one victory and two draws.

Many of the matches played by the Bohemian-Moravian selection are not considered official matches by the International Federation of Association Football. This is particularly the case for all matches played under the aegis of the UIAFA, FIFA's competing federation, as well as two of the 1939 matches, only the match against Germany being considered official.

The following table summarizes the known record of the selection in friendly matches and competitions.

Results of the Bohemia and Moravia team
Competition	Editions	Titles	P	W	N	L	GS	GC	GD
Friendly (1903–1908)	–	–	7	1	2	4	15	24	−9
Friendly (1939)	–	–	3	1	2	0	16	12	4
UIAFA Grand Tournament (1911)	1	1	2	2	0	0	6	2	4
Total (Note: The total is given as an indication only, as many matches are not recognised by FIFA.)	–	–	12	4	4	4	37	38	−1

== Image and identity ==
When football arrived in the 1890s in Austria-Hungary, part of the Austro-Hungarian high society was reluctant about this new sport because of its "violent" and very physical nature. In 1900, some members of the Budapest city council considered banning football from the country, but the proposal was refused and football remained permitted in Hungary. Despite this, the sport continues to be despised by Magyar high society who consider it "repugnant" because of its violent and "uncivilized" characteristics. The backlash from these criticisms resulted in an increase in the popularity of this sport, particularly among the middle and working classes.

The first national teams in Central Europe were created in response to the popularization of the sport. The region was then mainly under the domination of Austria-Hungary but this state being multi-ethnic, separate teams from Austria and Hungary were created and played their first match in 1902.

Subsequently, other teams appeared within the Empire, including that of Bohemia and Moravia. Representing only part of Cisleithania, the legitimacy of the federation and its team is called into question. This is why the Austrian federation successfully requested its rejection of FIFA. This rejection led to the disappearance of the team, including being banned from participating in the Olympic Games. It was ultimately World War I and then the recasting of the boundaries of the different European states which legitimized the selection: the team from Czechoslovakia which succeeded it, representing an independent and internationally recognized state.

The team colors are red and white, those of the Bohemian flag. Regarding the team's emblematic tactical devices, it is often aligned in "2–3–5", like most teams of the era. However, the team was aligned in "4–3–3" by John William Madden to counter English attacks in the final of the UIAFA "Grand European Association Football Tournament" of 1911, successfully. In 1909, after the match against the Cercle athletic de Paris, the French journalists from L'Auto described the game of the players of the Bohemian-Moravian selection, as "that of the English professionals, slow, precise, the players positioning themselves well, a head game giving satisfactory results".

== Bibliography ==
- NSOL (2018). "Tour du Monde – Zoom sur la Bohême-Moravie". Demivolée.com (in French).
- Manière, Fabienne (2013). "6 août 1806 - Fin du Saint Empire Romain Germanique - Herodote.net". www.herodote.net.
- UEFA.org (n.d.). "Le site officiel du football européen". UEFA (in French).
- Duke, Vic (7 July 2011). "From Bohemian Rhapsody to a New World : The Organization of Football in the Czech Republic". The Organisation and Governance of Top Football Across Europe: An Institutional Perspective. Routledge. ISBN 978-1-136-70532-8.
- RSSSF (n.d.a). "Czechoslovakia / Czech Republic - List of League Tables". www.rsssf.org.
- Dietschy, Paul (2014). Histoire du football (in French). Place des éditeurs. ISBN 978-2-262-04841-9.
- RSSSF (n.d.b). "Bohemia and Moravia - International Matches". www.rsssf.org.
- IFFHS (n.d.a). "Raisons d'exclusion ou d'admission aux matches internationaux "A" (1901–1910) by FIFA / IFFHS". Archived from the original on 20 December 2013.
- IFFHS (n.d.b). "Interesting and curious facts about full internationals and national players (1901–1910)". Archived from the original on 4 December 2010.
- nv.fotbal.cz (n.d.a). "ČR 2 – 5 (2–1) Uhry". nv.fotbal.cz.
- nv.fotbal.cz (n.d.b). "(cs) « ČR 2 – 5 (0–1) Uhry".
- englandfootballonline.com (n.d.). "England match No. 98 – Bohemia".
- linguasport.com (n.d.). "Olympic Football Tournament (London 1908)". Archived from the original on 13 June 2012.
- Desmarets, Robert (1909a). "Bohême contre Cercle athlétique de Paris". L'Auto-Vélo.
- "Les Tchèques à Lille". L'Auto-Vélo. 1909.
- Desmarets, Robert (1909b). "La Bohême bat Cercle athlétique de Paris". L'Auto-Vélo.
- Tomlinson, Alan (2014). FIFA (Fédération internationale de football association): the men, the myths and the money. New York: Routledge. ISBN 978-0-415-49830-2.
- Dunkerque Sports (1911). "La Semaine Sportive, no 143". Gallica.
- scottishcomedyfc.com (2013). "Scottish Football's Coaching Pioneers 1: John Madden".
- Bunk, Brian (2014). "The Inter-Allied Games, Top Stars". Soccer History USA.
- eu-football.info (n.d.a). "MATCHES → Czech Republic national football team v all opponents in all times". eu-football.info.
- Courtney, Barrie; Samák, Miroslav (2014). "Slovakia – List of International Matches". RSSSF.
- eu-football.info (n.d.b). "MATCHES → Czech Republic national football team v all opponents in 1938–1950". eu-football.info.
- athlet.org (1939). "L'Allemagne et la Bohême se séparent sur un match nul 4 à 4 en amical".
- czech.cz (n.d.). "Football is a very popular sport in the Czech Republic".
- gardiens.europe.free.fr (n.d.a). "Bohême".
- gardiens.europe.free.fr (n.d.b). "Bohême – Moravie".
- eu-football.info (n.d.c). "Football CLUB: S.K. Slavia, Praha".
- national-football-teams.com (n.d.). "Karel Kotouč".
- eu-football.info (n.d.d). "Football PLAYER: Jan Starý".
- 11v11.com (n.d.a). "BOHEMIA v Hungary, 06 October 1907".
- 11v11.com (n.d.b). "Bohemia v England, 13 June 1908".
- eu-football.info (n.d.e). "Football PLAYER: Jan Starý".
- FIFA.com (n.d.). "Statistiques de la Coupe du monde 1934".
- RSSSF (n.d.c). "Prolific Scorers Data".
- eu-football.info (n.d.f). "MANAGERS → managed Czech Republic national team, in chronological order".
- eu-football.info (n.d.g). "Football MANAGER: František Blažej".
- Swierczeková, Lucie (n.d.). "Fotbal 1891 – 2006" (PDF). nm.cz.
- eu-football.info (n.d.h). "Football VENUE: Stadion Slavii, Praha".
- eu-football.info (n.d.i). "Football VENUE: Generali Arena, Praha".
- Molnar, Gyozo; Doczi, Tamas; Gál, Andrea (7 July 2011). "Socio-Cultural Organization of Hungarian Football : An Overview". The Organisation and Governance of Top Football Across Europe: An Institutional Perspective. Routledge. ISBN 978-1-136-70532-8.
- fr.uefa.com (n.d.). "L'Histoire hongroise attend un nouveau chapitre".
