= Sergey Nikitsky =

Sergey Pavlovich Nikitsky (Russian: Сергей Павлович Никитский, 1859-after 1913) was a Russian theologian, writer, translator.

In 1879 he graduated from the Viphanskaja Theological Seminary, in 1879 entered, and in 1883 he graduated from the Moscow Theological Academy (1st master's degree of the XXXVIII course of theological department). He is a Candidate of Theology. Nikitsky taught at the Kharkov Theological Seminary, then Moscow Theological Seminary.

== Works ==
- Никитский, Сергей Павлович. Вера православной восточной греко-российской церкви по ее символическим книгам : Систематический сборник извлечений из определений соборов вселенских и поместных, правил св. апостол и св. отцев, послания патриархов православно-кафолич. церкви о православной вере, православного исповедания кафолической и апостольской церкви восточной и катихизиса Филарета, митрополита Московского, составленный преподавателем Московской духовной семинарии Сергеем Никитским. Тетр. 1-. - Москва : тип. Ф. Иогансон, 1887.
- Августин (Гуляницкий, Андрей Федорович; 1838–1892). Руководство к основному богословию / Сост. ректор Литов. дух. семинарии архиеп. Августин, ныне еп. Аккерманский. - 3-е изд., приспособленное к новой программе по введению в богословие для духовных семинарий, вновь пересмотр. и испр. канд. богословия С. Никитским. - Москва : тип. Е.Г. Потапова, 1894. - VIII, 320 с.;
- Никитский, Сергей Павлович. Вера православной восточной греко-российской церкви по ее символическим книгам : Сист. сб. извлеч. из определений соборов вселен. и помест., правил св. апостол и св. отцев, послания патриархов православно-кафолич. церкви о правосл. вере, правосл. исповедания кафолич. и апост. церкви восточ. и катехизиса Филарета, митрополита Моск. / [Соч.] Сергея Никитского. - 2-е изд. Тетр. 1–2. - Москва : тип. Ф. Иогансон, 1889–1890. - 2 т.
- Никитский, Сергей Павлович. Учение христианской православной церкви о нравственности, или Нравственное богословие / Изложил Сергей Никитский. Вып. 1-. - Москва : типо-лит. Бонч-Бруевича, 1899. - 23. Главные элементы и проявления нравственности. - 1899. - [2], 139 с.
- Никитский, Сергей Павлович. Вера православной восточной греко-российской церкви по ее символическим книгам : Сист. сб. извлеч. из определений соборов вселен. и помест., правил св. апостол и св. отцев, послания патриархов православно-кафолич. церкви о правосл. вере, правосл. исповедания кафолич. и апост. церкви восточ. и катехизиса Филарета, митрополита Моск. / [Соч.] Сергея Никитского. - 2-е изд. Тетр. 1–2. - Москва : тип. Ф. Иогансон, 1889–1890. - 2 т.
- Безе, Генрих. Достоверность наших евангелий : Апологетич. опыт Генриха Безе / Пер. с нем. под ред. канд. богосл. Сергея Никитского. - Москва : типо-лит. Д.А. Бонч-Бруевича, 1899. - 174, [1] с.;
- Дидон, Анри. Доказательства божественности Иисуса Христа / Дидон; Пер. с фр. под ред. канд. богословия С.П. Никитского. - Москва, 1899. - 251 с.;
- Пфеннигсдорф, Эмиль (Pfennigsdorf, Emil (1868–1952)). Иисус Христос в современной духовной жизни : Христиан. введение в духов. мир настоящего времени / Е.[!] Пфеннигсдорф; Пер. с 7 нем. изд. С.П. Никитского. - Харьков : тип. Губ. правл., 1907. - [2], IV, 304, VII с.;
- Пибоди, Фрэнсис Гринвуд. Иисус Христос и социальный вопрос / Фр. Г. Пибоди, проф. христианской морали в Гарвард. ун-те; Пер. с авториз. нем. изд. С.П. Никитского. - 2-е изд., испр. - Москва : Т-во типо-лит. И.М. Машистова, 1907. - 319 с.;
- Деннерт, Эберхард. Геккель и его "Мировые загадки" по суждениям специалистов / Д-р Е. Деннерт; Пер. с нем. Василия Колмовского; Под ред. [и с предисл.] Сергея Никитского. - Москва : т-во типо-лит. И.М. Машистова, 1909. - VIII, 179 с.;
- Гупперт, Филипп (Huppert, Philipp). Итоги четырехсотлетнего самобытного развития немецкого протестантизма к началу 20-го столетия : (По протестант. источникам) / Д-р богословия и философии Ф. Гупперт; Пер. с 3-го нем. изд. С. Никитского. - Харьков : тип. Губ. правл., 1910. - [1], IV, 162, II с.;
- Пфеннигсдорф, Эмиль. Иисус Христос в современной духовной жизни : Христиан. введение в духов. мир настоящего времени / Е.[!] Пфеннигсдорф; Пер. с 7 нем. изд. С.П. Никитского. - Москва : тип. "Земля", 1913. - XV, 265 с.;
- Никитский, Сергей Павлович. Вера православной восточной греко-российской церкви по ее символическим книгам : Сист. сб. извлечений из определений соборов вселен. и помест., правил св. апостол и св. отцев, послания патриархов Правосл.-кафол. церкви о правосл. вере. правосл. исповедания кафол. и апостол. церкви вост. и катихизиса Филарета, митр. Моск., сост. С. Никитским. - СПб. : Светослов, 1998. - 94 с.;
