= Georges Moreel =

French footballer (1924–2003)

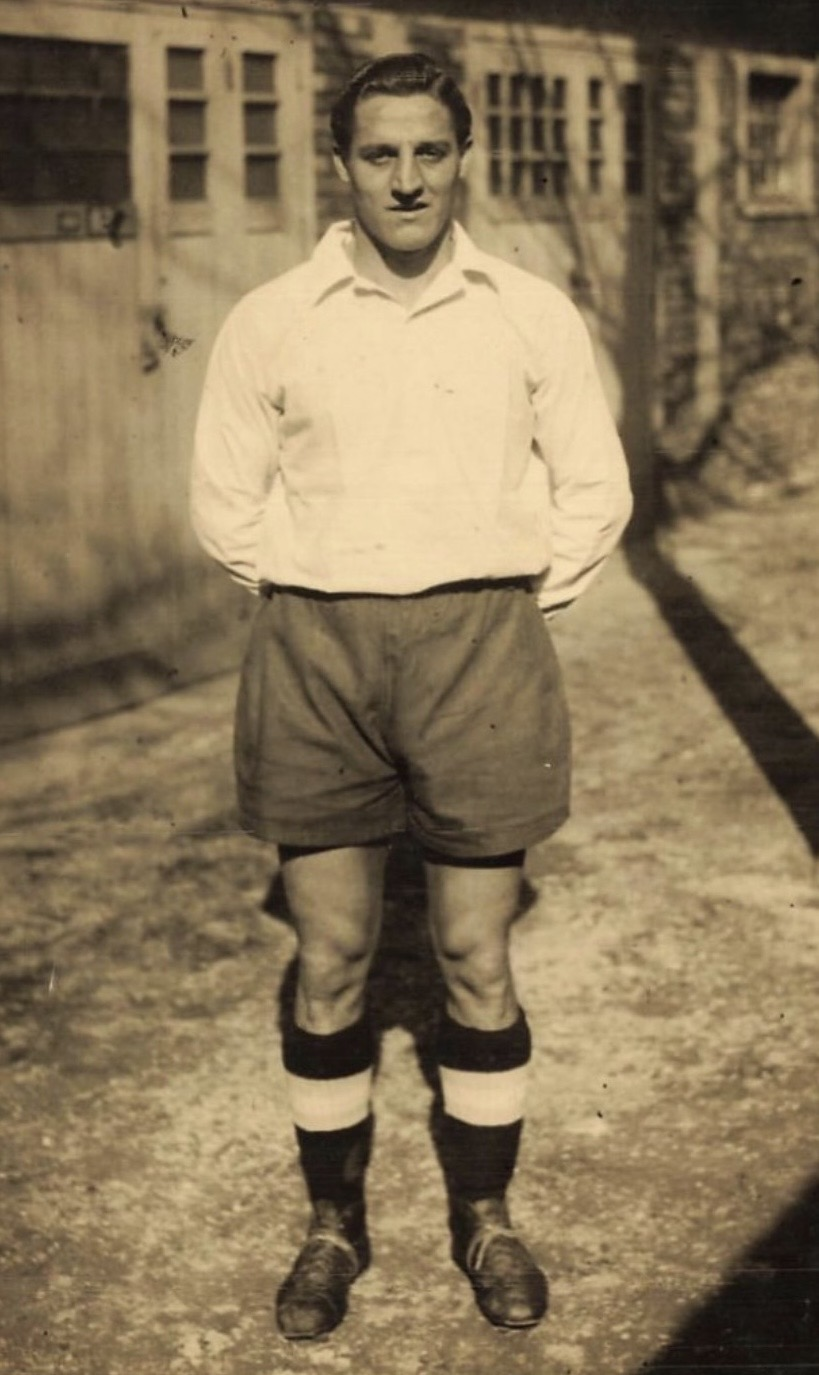

Personal information
- Full name: Georges Eugène Moreel
- Date of birth: 22 July 1924
- Place of birth: Gennevilliers, France
- Date of death: 4 December 2003 (aged 79)
- Place of death: Argenteuil, France
- Height: 1.76 m (5 ft 9 in)
- Position: Forward

Senior career*
Years	Team	Apps	(Gls)
- USA Clichy
?–1945	FEC Levallois		
1945–1946	CA Paris		
1946–1952	RC Paris		
1952–1954	Olympique de Marseille		

International career
1949	France	1	(1)
- * Club domestic league appearances and goals

Georges Eugène Moreel (22 July 1924 – 4 December 2003) was a French footballer who played as a forward for RC Paris and Olympique de Marseille between 1946 and 1954. He also played one match for the French national team in 1949.

== Club career ==
Born on 22 July 1924 in the Hauts-de-Seine town of Gennevilliers, Moreel began his career at USA Clichy, similarly to other future internationals, such as Georges Stuttler, Ernest Vaast, and André Grillon. After a brief stint at FEC Levallois, he joined CA Paris in 1945, but at the end of the season, he signed for RC Paris.

Together with Lucien Leduc, Roger Quenolle, and Vaast, Moreel was a member of the RC Paris team that won the Coupe de France title in 1949, helping his side defeat Lille 5–2 in the final. He was involved in his side's 5th goal as one of his shots was deflected by Lille's defender Joseph Jadrejak, which resulted in an own goal. He stayed at RC Paris for six years, from 1946 until 1952, when he moved to Olympique de Marseille, where he retired in 1954, aged 30. In total, he scored 94 goals in 200 Ligue 1 matches.

== International career ==
On 22 May 1949, two weeks after the Cup final, the 24-year-old Moreel earned his first (and only) international cap for France in a friendly against England at Colombes, scoring the opening goal of the match in the 25th second, but then missing an easy opportunity as his side lost 3–1. The following day, the journalists of French newspaper L'Auto (the forerunner of L'Équipe) stated that after his goal, he "fought valiantly until half-time, he gradually lost confidence". As of 2021, Moreel still holds the record for the fastest goal scored for France by a debutant.

== Death ==
Moreel died in Argenteuil on 4 December 2003, at the age of 79.

== Honours ==
RC Paris

- Coupe de France:
  - Champions (1): 1949
