= Alphonse Nicol =

French footballer

Personal information
- Full name: Alphonse Niculescu
- Place of birth: France
- Position: Midfielder

Senior career*
Years	Team	Apps	(Gls)
1906–1912	Racing Club de France		

International career
1911	France (UIAFA)	4	(0)
- * Club domestic league appearances and goals

Alphonse Nicol was a French footballer who played as a midfielder for Racing Club de France and who was the captain of the French national team in the 1911 UIAFA European Football Tournament at Roubaix.

== Biography ==
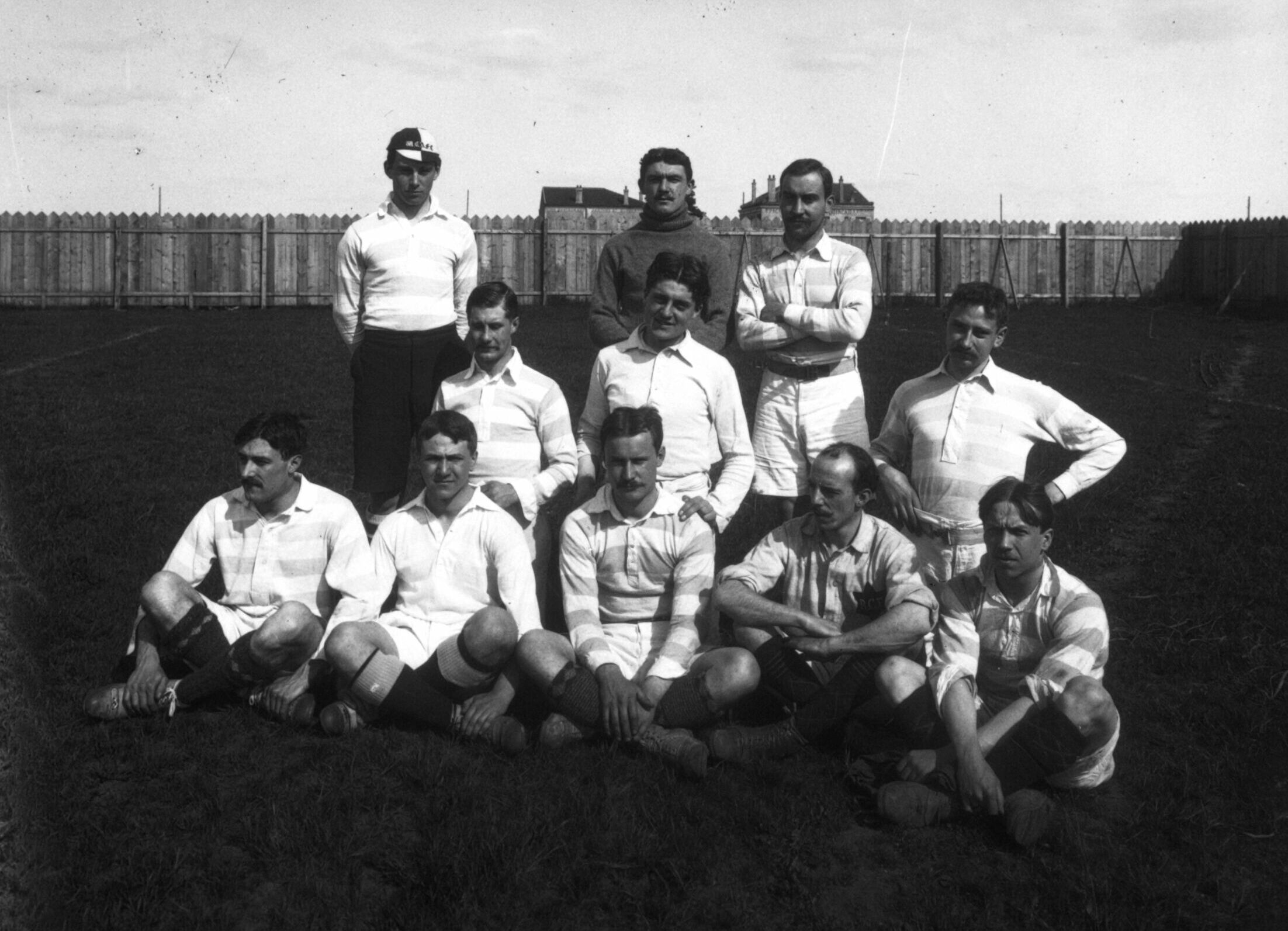
Nicol with the Racing team that won the 1906 Coupe Dewar final.

Alphonse Niculescu was born to a Romanian father, but later became a naturalized French, changing his name to Alphonse Nicol. On 6 May 1906, he started in the final of the Coupe Dewar at the Stade de Charentonneau, helping his side to a 2–1 win over Gallia Club. He had to five years for his next appearance in a final, which took place in Marseille on 30 April at the 1911 USFSA Football Championship, starting as a midfielder in an eventual 3–2 loss to Stade Helvétique de Marseille. In the following year, on 14 April, he was the captain of Racing in the final of the 1912 Coupe Dewar, helping his side to a 3–1 win over Club Français.

Nicol made four unofficial appearances for France (UIAFA), all of which as captain, including two against England AFA, first in Paris on 23 March 1911 (3–1 loss), and then in London on 1 January 1912 (7–1 loss). He was the captain of the French squad that participated in the 1911 UIAFA European Football Tournament at Roubaix, an unofficial European Championship organized by UIAFA, in which France was knocked out in the semifinals by Bohemia (1–4). He played his fourth and last match for UIAFA's France on 20 February, in a friendly match against Catalonia, helping his side to a 7–0 victory. He is thus the most capped player of UIAFA's France with four appearances, alongside club teammates, Auguste Schalbart and Guy de Gastyne, and Carlos Bacrot and Victor Denis.

== Honours ==
Racing Club de France

- USFSA Football Championship runner-up: 1911
- Coupe Dewar: 1906, 1912
