= Valášek =

Valášek is a surname. Notable people with the surname include:

- Chris Valasek (born 1982), American computer security researcher
- Jindřich Valášek (1886–1956), Czech footballer
- Joseph Valasek (1897–1993), American physicist
- Tomáš Valášek (born 1972), Slovak diplomat
