= Antonín Šetela =

Czech footballer (1882–?)

Personal information
- Date of birth: 12 April 1882
- Place of birth: Nusle, Austria-Hungary
- Position: Forward

Senior career*
Years	Team	Apps	(Gls)
- Smíchov

International career
1906	Bohemia	1	(0)
- * Club domestic league appearances and goals

Antonín Šetela (12 April 1882, date of death unknown) was a Czech footballer who played as a forward.

== Club career ==
During his playing career, Šetela played for Smíchov.

== International career ==
On 1 April 1906, Šetela made his debut for Bohemia in Bohemia's second game, (Note: The April 1906 meeting is regarded as the first official game for Bohemia by the Football Association of the Czech Republic (FAČR), with a meeting between Hungary and Bohemia on 5 April 1903 subsequently being recognised as a Prague representative team by the FAČR. The Hungarian Football Federation recognises the April 1903 meeting as official for Bohemia.) starting in a 1–1 draw against Hungary. In the 63rd minute, Šetela assisted Jindřich Valášek to score Bohemia's second international goal. It was Šetela's only cap for Bohemia.
