= Georges Stuttler =

French footballer (1897–1976)

Personal information
- Date of birth: 11 January 1897
- Place of birth: 11th arrondissement of Paris, France
- Date of death: 8 January 1976 (aged 78)
- Place of death: Garches, France
- Position: Forward

Senior career*
Years	Team	Apps	(Gls)
1915–?	USA Clichy		
1922–1923	Olympique		
1915–1928	Red Star		
1928–1930	Stade raphaëlois		

International career
1919	Paris	1	(0)
1926	France	1	(0)
- * Club domestic league appearances and goals

Georges Stuttler (11 January 1897 – 8 January 1976) was a French footballer who played as a forward for Red Star and the France national team in the late 1920s.

== Club career ==
Born in the 11th arrondissement of Paris on 11 January 1897, Stuttler began his career with USA Clichy, similarly to other future internationals, such as Georges Moreel, Ernest Vaast, and André Grillon. In September 1915, the 18-year-old Stuttler scored a diving shot from 25 meters to help Clichy to a 2–0 victory over CA Enghien.

In 1922, Stuttler joined the ranks of Olympique. On 13 May 1923, he started in the final of the 1923 Coupe de Paris, assisting the opening goal of the match to help his side to a 2–0 victory over his future club Red Star.

In 1925, Stuttler signed for Red Star, with whom he played for three years, until 1928, when he joined Stade raphaëlois, where he retired in 1930, aged 33. He helped the latter club reach the semifinals of the 1928–29 Coupe de France, which ended in a 1–0 loss to Montpellier; the following day, the journalists of the French newspaper Le Miroir des sports described him as "the most perfect simulator of contemporary French footballers", referring to his tedency to dive and feign injury, which caught the referee Lucien Leclercq off-guard.

== International career ==
In March 1919, Stuttler was selected to represent a USFSA XI in a friendly against a Alsace selection, and a few months later, in November, he was selected to play for the Paris football team in a friendly against a London XI, helping his side to a 4–3 win; despite scoring "a very strong shot from 18 meters", the press stated he "lacked big-match experience".

On 20 June 1926, the 29-year-old earned his first (and only) international cap for France in a friendly against Belgium at Stade Fallon, coming off the bench in the 16th minute to replace the injured captain Paul Nicolas in an eventual 2–2 draw.

== Death ==
Stuttler died in Garches on 8 January 1976, at the age of 78.

== Honours ==
Olympique

- Coupe de Paris:
  - Champions (2): 1923
