= Kārlis Ārens =

Latvian footballer and basketball player (1917–1997)

Personal information
- Date of birth: 18 December 1917
- Place of birth: Moscow Governorate, Russian Empire
- Date of death: 30 June 1997 (aged 79)
- Place of death: Florida, United States
- Position: Defender

Senior career*
Years	Team	Apps	(Gls)
1936	Sporta biedrība 13		
1937	Vilhelmas Ķuzes		
1938–1940	RPDS		
1942–1943	ASK Riga		
1946–1947	TSV Schwaben Augsburg		
1947–1949	RC Paris		
1950	CA Paris		
1950–1951	RC Paris		
1951–1953	Stade Français		
1953–1957	New York Lithuanians		
1957–1958	Brookhattan		
Basketball career
Career history
1937	V. Ķuze
1937–????	Rīgas ASK
Medals Men's basketball Representing Latvia EuroBasket: Second place / 1939 Lithuania
- * Club domestic league appearances and goals

Kārlis Ārens (18 December 1917 – 30 June 1997), sometimes spelt as Karl Arens, was a Latvian basketball player and footballer who played as a defender.

== Football career ==
Ārens began playing football in elementary school, and made his debut in 1936 for Sporta biedrība 13. The following year, he joined the Vilhelmas Ķuzes factory team. Between 1942 and 1943, he played for ASK Riga.

Following the end of World War II, Ārens ended up in a refugee camp in Mannheim. There, he played for an exile football team, along with fellow Latvians Jānis Bebris and Valdemārs Baumanis. In 1946, he joined Oberliga Süd side TSV Schwaben Augsburg. After a season there, he joined RC Paris in 1947, becoming one of four Latvian players to play in France during the late 1940s, along with Bebris, Strasbourg's Aleksandrs Vanags, and Lens's Harijs Gailis. In 1949, he won the Coupe de France with RC Paris after beating Lille 5–2 in the final.

In 1953, Ārens emigrated to the United States. Prior to emigrating, he completed a coaching course at the French Football Federation. In the United States, he worked in construction as he continued playing football in New York, playing for both Cosmopolitan Soccer League side New York Lithuanians and American Soccer League side Brookhattan.

== Basketball career ==
While at Vilhelmas Ķuzes, Ārens also played basketball. In 1937, he joined Rīgas ASK. Internationally, he made his debut for the Lativan national team in 1938, and the following year, played for Latvia at EuroBasket 1939, where he averaged 7.9 ppg as Latvia finished runners-up. In total, he played 22 times for Latvia.

Ārens's basketball career was halted due to World War II.

== Personal life ==
Ārens was married to a woman named Tanya, who played for the Latvia national women's basketball team, and had three children, with one daughter passing away at the age of one, and two sons who both played basketball in university. In addition to football and basketball, he also played volleyball and table tennis, as well as novuss starting in the 1970s.

Ārens died on 30 June 1997, at the age of 80.
