= Paul Baron =

French footballer (1898–1973)

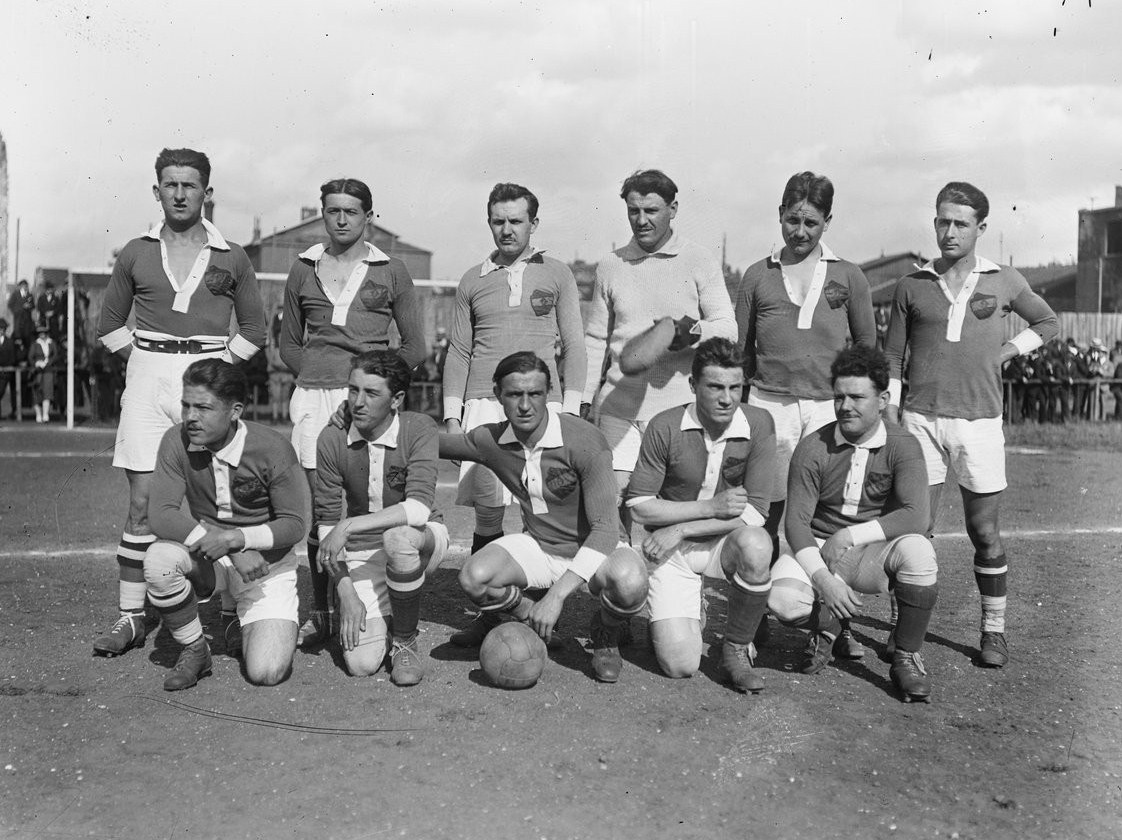
- Baron (back row, far right) lining up for Olympique de Paris on 19 September 1920

Personal information
- Full name: Corentin Camille André Baron
- Date of birth: 23 May 1898
- Place of birth: Saint-Maur-des-Fossés, France
- Date of death: 2 November 1973 (aged 75)
- Place of death: Saint-Médard-de-Mussidan, France
- Positions: Defender; midfielder

Senior career*
Years	Team	Apps	(Gls)
- VGA Saint-Maur
- AS Française
1920–1926	Olympique de Paris		
1926–1930	Red Star Olympique		
1930–1932	Racing Club de France		

International career
1923	France	1	(0)

Managerial career
- 1933–1935: Red Star Olympique
- 1935–1944: AS Saint Eugène
- 1944–1953: Racing Club de France
- 1953–1954: Haiti
- 1954–1956: AS Saint Eugène
- 1956–1957: Red Star Olympique
- 1957–1959: Cannes
- 1959–1960: Greece
- 1960–1961: Red Star Olympique
- 1964–1965: Racing Club de Paris
- * Club domestic league appearances and goals

Corentin Camille André Baron (23 May 1898 – 2 November 1973), also known as Paul Baron, was a French footballer and manager.

== Playing career ==
Baron began his career with hometown club VGA Saint-Maur, later joining AS Française. In 1920, Baron joined Olympique de Paris, playing for the club until 1926, when they merged with Red Star Amical Club, forming Red Star Olympique. Baron played for the new club for four years, winning the Coupe de France in 1928, before joining Racing Club de France, where he finished his career in 1932.

On 22 April 1923, Baron made his only appearance for France, playing in a 2–2 draw against Switzerland.

== Managerial career ==
Following his playing career, Baron moved into management, taking up the reigns at former club Racing Club de France. During his early managerial career Baron regularly moved from French Algeria to manage AS Saint Eugène, back to Racing Club de France, save for a spell with Haiti from 1953 to 1954. Baron won the Coupe de France twice with Racing Club, in 1945 and 1949. In 1956, Baron returned to Red Star Olympique, moving to Cannes a year later. In 1959, Baron was appointed manager of Greece, before returning to Red Star Olympique in 1960 for a year. In 1964, Baron moved back to the newly renamed Racing Club de Paris.
