= 2017–18 Czech National Football League =

Czech National Football League
- Season: 2017–18
- Champions: Opava
- Promoted: Opava, Příbram
- Relegated: Olympia, Frýdek-Místek
- Matches: 240
- Goals: 673 (2.8 per match)
- Top goalscorer: Jan Pázler (21)
- Biggest home win: Opava 7–0 Frýdek-Místek
- Biggest away win: Žižkov 1–5 Opava, Žižkov 0–4 Třinec
- Highest scoring: Opava 6–2 Vítkovice, Vítkovice 3–5 Žižkov
- Longest winning run: 7 matches (Opava)
- Longest unbeaten run: 16 matches (Opava)

The 2017–18 Czech National Football League was the 25th season of the Czech Republic's second tier football league.

== Team changes ==
Promoted team Olympia Hradec Králové moved from Hradec Králové to Prague and was renamed as Olympia Prague.

=== From FNL ===
- Sigma Olomouc (promoted to 2017–18 Czech First League)
- Baník Ostrava (promoted to 2017–18 Czech First League)
- Prostějov (relegated to 2017–18 Moravian–Silesian Football League)

=== To FNL ===
- Hradec Králové (relegated from 2016–17 Czech First League)
- Příbram (relegated from 2016–17 Czech First League)
- Olympia (promoted from 2016–17 Bohemian Football League)

Frýdek-Místek (15th place in 2016–17 FNL) were spared from relegation after Moravian–Silesian Football League winners SK Uničov and the next three best-placed teams in that league refused promotion.

== Team overview ==
Location of clubs in the 2017–18 Czech National Football League

== League table ==
Pos	Team	Pld	W	D	L	GF	GA	GD	Pts	Promotion or relegation
1	Opava (C, P)	30	18	9	3	76	33	+43	63	Promotion to 2018–19 I. liga
2	Příbram (P)	30	18	4	8	56	32	+24	58	Promotion to 2018–19 I. liga
3	Pardubice	30	16	3	11	44	30	+14	51	
4	Hradec Králové	30	14	8	8	50	36	+14	50	
5	Fotbal Třinec	30	12	11	7	42	30	+12	47	
6	Dynamo České Budějovice	30	11	11	8	44	33	+11	44	
7	Baník Sokolov	30	12	5	13	34	39	−5	41	
8	Vlašim	30	11	5	14	42	49	−7	38	
9	Znojmo	30	10	7	13	36	49	−13	37	
10	Ústí nad Labem	30	10	6	14	37	47	−10	36	
11	Varnsdorf	30	8	11	11	40	46	−6	35	
12	Viktoria Žižkov	30	10	5	15	42	52	−10	35	
13	Olympia (R)	30	8	10	12	33	45	−12	34	Relegation to 2018–19 ČFL
14	Táborsko	30	8	9	13	36	46	−10	33	
15	Vítkovice	30	7	9	14	35	52	−17	30	
16	Frýdek-Místek (R)	30	6	9	15	26	54	−28	27	Relegation to 2018–19 MSFL

Source: Fortuna národní liga
Rules for classification: 1) Points; 2) Goal difference; 3) Goals scored.
(C) Champions; (P) Promoted; (R) Relegated

== Results ==
Each team plays home-and-away against every other team in the league, for a total of 30 matches played each.

Home \ Away	CES	FRY	HRA	OLY	OPA	PAR	PRI	SOK	TAB	TRI	UST	VAR	VIT	VLA	ZIZ	ZNO
České Budějovice	—	1–1	4–1	0–1	2–1	0–0	1–2	4–1	1–1	0–0	2–0	2–2	6–0	0–2	1–1	3–2
Frýdek-Místek	1–2	—	0–0	1–2	1–1	0–2	2–1	0–0	1–0	1–0	1–2	1–1	2–2	1–1	0–2	2–2
Hradec Králové	2–1	4–0	—	4–1	1–4	2–1	0–2	0–1	1–1	5–1	1–3	2–0	2–0	2–1	4–1	1–1
Olympia Prague	0–0	1–4	1–1	—	1–1	1–0	2–2	0–1	1–0	0–0	1–3	2–2	0–2	1–1	2–2	4–1
Opava	1–1	7–0	3–2	5–1	—	1–0	1–1	0–0	2–1	1–1	2–0	3–3	6–2	3–1	3–0	3–0
Pardubice	4–3	1–0	0–1	2–0	0–1	—	1–2	2–1	3–0	1–0	3–1	3–2	4–1	2–0	3–1	0–1
Příbram	1–0	2–1	2–0	1–3	3–1	3–1	—	1–0	3–1	2–1	4–0	3–1	2–1	2–3	4–2	0–0
Sokolov	0–1	2–0	1–2	1–3	0–3	0–0	1–0	—	3–3	1–0	3–0	2–0	1–0	2–0	1–2	2–3
Táborsko	0–0	3–0	0–2	2–2	0–3	0–3	0–2	5–1	—	1–0	2–1	1–2	1–0	1–0	2–0	0–1
Třinec	1–1	2–2	0–0	2–0	3–3	1–0	2–1	1–1	5–1	—	1–1	2–2	0–0	0–1	1–0	2–1
Ústí nad Labem	2–0	0–1	1–1	2–0	2–5	0–0	1–0	2–1	3–3	0–3	—	1–1	4–0	2–1	0–3	4–0
Varnsdorf	2–3	1–0	1–1	2–1	1–2	4–2	2–5	0–1	1–1	0–1	1–0	—	0–0	0–0	3–2	3–0
Vítkovice	2–0	5–0	1–1	0–0	1–2	0–1	1–0	4–2	1–1	2–3	0–0	1–0	—	4–0	3–5	1–1
Vlašim	0–2	4–0	1–4	0–1	2–2	3–1	0–4	2–1	2–2	2–3	2–1	4–1	3–1	—	1–2	2–1
Viktoria Žižkov	1–2	1–2	2–0	1–0	1–5	0–1	1–1	1–2	0–2	0–4	2–1	0–0	5–0	0–1	—	2–1
Znojmo	1–1	2–1	1–3	2–1	2–1	1–3	2–0	0–1	2–1	0–2	3–0	0–2	0–0	3–2	2–2	—

Source: http://www.fnliga.cz
Legend: Blue = home team win; Yellow = draw; Red = away team win.

== Top scorers ==
Rank	Player	Club	Goals
1	(Czech Republic) Jan Pázler	Hradec Králové	21
2	(Serbia) Nemanja Kuzmanović	Opava	18
3	(Czech Republic) Zbyněk Musiol	Táborsko	13
4	(Czech Republic) David Puškáč	Opava	12
5	(Czech Republic) Jan Matoušek	Příbram	11
5	(Czech Republic) Tomáš Smola	Opava	11
5	(Czech Republic) Pavel Vyhnal	Vlašim	11
8	(Democratic Republic of the Congo) Joel Ngandu Kayamba	Opava	10
8	(Czech Republic) Václav Juřena	Třinec	10
8	(North Macedonia) Fahrudin Gjurgjevikj	Varnsdorf	10
8	(Czech Republic) Stanislav Klobása	Varnsdorf	10

== See also ==
- 2017–18 Czech First League
- 2017–18 Czech Cup
