= FK Olympia Prague =

- Full name: Fotbalový klub Olympia Praha
- Founded: 2017
- Dissolved: 2018 (merged with SC Radotín)
- Ground: Atletický stadion SC Radotín, Prague
- League: Bohemian League
- 2017–18: Czech National League, 13th (relegated)
- Website: http://www.fkolympia.cz/
Home colours	Away colours

FK Olympia Prague was a Czech football club located originally in the Střížkov district of Prague, Czech Republic. It competes in the Bohemian Football League, the third tier of football in the country.

== History ==
Olympia Prague was a successor club to FC Olympia Hradec Králové. In 2017, after Olympia Hradec Králové finished second in the Bohemian Football League and won promotion to the Czech National Football League, a fully professional competition, their players and staff moved to Prague and formed a newly founded club under the name FK Olympia Prague. The cited reason for this move was that their home stadium did not meet the requirements for professional football and the only stadium in Hradec Králové that did was already in use by FK Hradec Králové, another Czech National Football League club. Despite staying clear of the relegation zone in their first season in the second-tier league, chairman Angelos Goulis announced the club had decided to willingly move one tier down the football pyramid into the Bohemian Football League. The club relocated from Střížkov to Radotín and merged with SC Radotín (a local lower-league club) in 2018, with the merged club being named SC Olympia Radotín.

== Players ==
=== Last squad ===
As of 9 March 2018.

Note: Flags indicate national team as defined under FIFA eligibility rules; some limited exceptions apply. Players may hold more than one non-FIFA nationality.

No.	Pos.	Nation	Player
1	GK	CZE	Jan Stejskal
2	DF	CYP	Demetris Moulazimis
4	DF	CZE	Milan Mišůn
6	MF	CZE	Petr Rothe (on loan from Bohemians)
7	MF	SVK	Erik Liener
8	DF	CZE	David Broukal
9	MF	CZE	Miroslav Verner
10	MF	BRA	Bernardo Frizoni (on loan from Bohemians)
11	FW	CZE	Richard Jukl
12	MF	FRA	Denzel Custos
14	MF	GRE	Thomas Vasiliou (on loan from Atromitos)

No.	Pos.	Nation	Player
15	MF	ISR	Sagi Giditz
18	DF	CZE	Ondřej Žežulka (on loan from Slavia Prague)
19	MF	SVK	Jakub Michlík (on loan from Zilina B)
20	FW	CZE	Karel Hejný
21	MF	GRE	Giorgos Katidis
22	FW	FRA	Ibrahim Keita
23	GK	CZE	Lukáš Soukup
24	MF	CZE	Ondřej Ruml
25	FW	CZE	David Novák
27	GK	CZE	Ondřej Čáp

== Managers ==
- Miloš Sazima (2017)
- Vladimír Skalba (2017)
- Motti Ivanir (2017–2018)
- Oldřich Pařízek (2018)
- David Jarolím (2018–2019)
