= Jindřich Rezek =

Bohemian footballer

Personal information
- Date of birth: 31 January 1884
- Place of birth: Karlín, Austria-Hungary
- Date of death: 14 August 1940 (aged 56)
- Position: Midfielder

Youth career
- –1899: AFK Karlín
- 1899–1901: AC Sparta Prague

Senior career*
Years	Team	Apps	(Gls)
1901–	AC Sparta Prague		
–1904	AFK Karlín		
1904–1911	AC Sparta Prague		

International career
1903–1906	Bohemia	2	(1)
- * Club domestic league appearances and goals

Jindřich Rezek (31 January 1884 – 14 August 1940) was a Bohemian international footballer. His is a midfielder in his football team.
