= René Vignal =

French footballer (1926-2016)

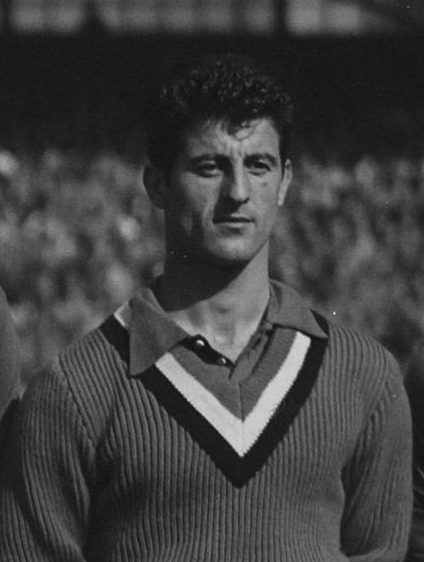
- René Vignal, April 1949

Personal information
- Date of birth: 12 August 1926
- Place of birth: Béziers, France
- Date of death: 21 November 2016 (aged 90)
- Position: Goalkeeper

Senior career*
Years	Team	Apps	(Gls)
1944–1947	Toulouse		
1947–1955	RC Paris		
1958–1960	Béziers		

International career
1949–1954	France	17	(0)
- * Club domestic league appearances and goals

René Vignal (12 August 1926 – 21 November 2016) was a French footballer who played as a goalkeeper. He played for Toulouse, RC Paris and Béziers at club level as well as the France national team.
