= Bohumil Jelínek =

Personal information
- Full name: Bohumil Jelínek-Milka
- Position: Striker

Senior career*
Years	Team	Apps	(Gls)
- Smíchov

International career
1906–1907	Bohemia	2	(1)
- * Club domestic league appearances and goals

Bohumil Jelínek-Milka was a Czech footballer who played as a striker.

== Club career ==
During his playing career, Jelínek played for Smíchov.

== International career ==
On 1 April 1906, Jelínek made his debut for Bohemia in Bohemia's second game, (Note: The April 1906 meeting is regarded as the first official game for Bohemia by the Football Association of the Czech Republic (FAČR), with a meeting between Hungary and Bohemia on 5 April 1903 subsequently being recognised as a Prague representative team by the FAČR. The Hungarian Football Federation recognises the April 1903 meeting as official for Bohemia.) starting in a 1–1 draw against Hungary. Jelínek would later make one more appearance for Bohemia on 7 April 1907, scoring in a 5–2 defeat against the same opposition.

=== International goals ===
Scores and results list Bohemia's goal tally first.

#	Date	Venue	Opponent	Score	Result	Competition
1	7 April 1907	Millenáris Sporttelep, Budapest, Austria-Hungary	Hungary	1–2	2–5	Friendly
