= František Rosmaisl =

Personal information
- Full name: František Rosmaisl-Majzl
- Date of birth: 25 April 1884
- Place of birth: Uhlířské Janovice, Austria-Hungary
- Date of death: 9 May 1945 (aged 61)
- Position: Striker

Senior career*
Years	Team	Apps	(Gls)
1904–1906	Smíchov		
1906–1914	Slavia Prague		

International career
1906	Bohemia	1	(0)
- * Club domestic league appearances and goals

František Rosmaisl-Majzl (25 April 1884 – 9 May 1945) was a Czech footballer who played as a striker.

== Club career ==
Rosmaisl began his career with Smíchov in 1904, before moving to Slavia Prague in 1906. Rosmaisl played for Slavia Prague until 1914.

== International career ==
On 1 April 1906, Rosmaisl made his debut for Bohemia in Bohemia's second game, (Note: The April 1906 meeting is regarded as the first official game for Bohemia by the Football Association of the Czech Republic (FAČR), with a meeting between Hungary and Bohemia on 5 April 1903 subsequently being recognised as a Prague representative team by the FAČR. The Hungarian Football Federation recognises the April 1903 meeting as official for Bohemia.) starting in a 1–1 draw against Hungary. It was Rosmaisl's only cap for Bohemia.
