= Roger Quenolle =

French footballer and manager (1925–2004)

Personal information
- Full name: Roger Jean Clément Quenolle
- Date of birth: 19 July 1925
- Place of birth: Le Vésinet, Yvelines, France
- Date of death: 13 July 2004 (aged 78)
- Place of death: Le Vésinet, Yvelines, France
- Position: Forward

Youth career
- 1941–1945: US Vésinet

Senior career*
Years	Team	Apps	(Gls)
1945–1952	RC Paris	100+ (Note: Statistics from 1945 to 1947 are unclear.)	(37+)
1947–1948	→ Rouen (loan)		
1952–1953	Strasbourg	31	(17)
1953–1957	Red Star	125	(52)
1957–1965	Stade Saint-Germain		

International career
1949	France	2	(0)

Managerial career
- 1957–1969: Stade Saint-Germain
- 1969–1983: Poissy
- * Club domestic league appearances and goals

Roger Jean Clément Quenolle (19 July 1925 – 13 July 2004) was a French professional footballer who played as a forward.

During his career, he played for RC Paris, Rouen, Strasbourg, Red Star, and Stade Saint-Germain. He was capped twice for France. Quenolle later coached Stade Saint-Germain and Poissy.

== Honours ==
=== Player ===
RC Paris

- Coupe de France: 1948–49; runner-up: 1949–50

=== Manager ===
Poissy

- Division 3: 1976–77
