= 1911 UIAFA European Football Tournament =

Great European football tournament

Tournament details
- Country: France
- Dates: 25 – 29 May
- Teams: 4

Final positions
- Champions: Bohemia
- Runners-up: England AFA

Tournament statistics
- Matches played: 3
- Goals scored: 11 (3.67 per match)
- Top goal scorer(s): (Bohemia) Josef Bělka (2 goals) (Bohemia) Jan Kosek (2 goals)

The 1911 UIAFA European Football Tournament (French: Grand Tournoi européen de football) was an unofficial European Championship organized by UIAFA (Union Internationale Amateur de Football Association), which was competing with FIFA at the time.

The tournament was held within the framework of the 1911 international exhibition of Northern France in Roubaix, France, between 25 and 29 May. It was won by the Bohemia national team (ČSF). Several European national teams participated, which caused some historians, quite preposterously, to term this cup as the first European international championship in the history of football, although that title can also be attributed to the 1908 Olympic Games, which was open to all countries. It was held nearly half a century before the first official European Football Championship in 1960, coincidentally also held in France, and over a decade before the first edition of the Central European International Cup in 1927–1930.

== Background ==
A stadium was built for the international exhibition, which was located on the current Boulevard du Général de Gaulle in the commune of Croix. Roubaix sportsmen hoped for it to become a municipal stadium, but they would have to wait 20 years before they could benefit from such a facility, the Roubaix Velodrome, located at the other end of the city.

On 11 April 1911, the French newspaper L'Auto (the future L'Équipe) announced the football program for the inauguration of the Stade de l'Exposition de Roubaix (Stadium of the Roubaix exhibition) on 7 May, which was composed of two matches, the final of the USFSA Military Association Championship, and a friendly between the representative team of Northern France and the amateur team of Wales, but they changed plans within a few days and had to be replaced by a club from the AFA, which turned out to be Old Malvernians. However, the final of the Military Championship was only played on 14 May in Le Havre, so the first-ever match of this stadium ended up being a semifinal for that tournament between 43eme Infanterie Lille and 23eme Bataillon Chasseurs Alpins Grasse on 7 May, which ended in a 12–0 win to the former. Later that day, Northern France won the stadium's second match by beating Old Malvernians 3–1 in front of 5,000 spectators. A week later, on 14 May, a Roubaix XI defeated Lyford FC 1–0 in front of a smaller crowd of just 1,000; only the qualities of the London goalkeeper prevented the Roubaix team from winning more widely. For the latter match, the price of tickets varied from 50 centimes (stands) to 1 franc (tribunes), and 2 francs (tribunes of honor), but for the tournament, the prices rose to 4 francs in the tribunes of honor, and 2 in the tribunes, although it remained at 50 centimes for the stands.

On 25 May, the Bohemian team (ČSF), who was on their way to Roubaix, stopped at Brussels to play a friendly against the Belgian UIAFA members. Interesting, Bohemia played this game in Slavia Prague jerseys, winning 6–1, thanks to braces from Jan Košek, Václav Pilát, and Otto Bohata.

== Participants ==
Originally, the tournament was to be contested by the national teams of all of UIAFA's 6 members, France (USFSA), England (AFA), Bohemia (ČSF), Switzerland (LSS), Belgium (FBSA), and Spain (FECF), but the latter was ultimately not invited to enter, while Belgium withdrew for unknown reasons, but it was most likely the result of their 1–6 defeat at the hands of Bohemia just a few days prior. This left the three founding members and Switzerland, but following tensions between the Alemannic and the Romands, the Swiss withdrew at the last minute, so the Organizing Committee decided to grant the vacant place to a team representing the Northern Committee of the USFSA, the so-called Northern France. Hungary was also announced as participants on 11 April, but this was most likely the result of a confused French journalist, since no Hungarian federation ever joined the UIAFA.

The English AFA team (Amateur Football Alliance) is not related to the England Amateur side fielded by the English FA at the time, which was obviously stronger.

Team	Association
England	Amateur Football Association (AFA)
France	Union des sociétés françaises de sports athlétiques (USFSA)
Bohemia	Český svaz footballový (ČSF)
Spain	Federación Española de Clubs de Football (FECF) (withdrew)
Belgium	Fédération Belge des Sports Athlétiques (FBSA) (withdrew)
Switzerland	Ligue Sportive Suisse (LSS) (withdrew)
North of France	Northern France

== Squads ==
The Bohemian team, coached by Johnny Madden, was made up largely of players taken from the club Slavia Prague, such as goalkeeper Karel Pimmer; defender Richard Veselý, midfielders František Rosmaisl and Emmanuel Benda; and forwards Miroslav Široký, Pilát, and Bohata, captained by main star Jan Košek. The only exceptions were Josef Bělka of Sparta Prague, and Miroslav Hajný of SK Smíchov.

The French A team was made up mainly of players from Parisian clubs (Racing Club de France, Stade Français, USA Clichy, AS Française), such as goalkeeper Guy De Gastyne; defenders Victor Denis and Auguste Schalbart, and midfielders Émile Sartorius and Alphonse Nicol (captain), even though the attacking line was composed of players from Olympique Lillois: Carlos Bacrot, Paul Chandelier, Paul Voyeux, and Albert Eloy. The only players who earned caps for the official French team were Denis and Sartorius, but the former had to withdraw and was replaced by Henri Moigneu.

The team of Northern France was made up largely of players from US Tourquennoise, Stade Roubaisien, Racing Club de Roubaix, such as goalkeeper Albert Parsys, defender Gabriel Hanot, and forward Raymond Dubly, to which was added the attacking line of Olympique Lillois, whose players were also retained in the first French team (Eloy, Bacrot, Chandelier, and Voyeux). This team included three future internationals: Eloy (2 selections in 1913 and 1914), Chandelier (3 selections in 1913 and 1914), and Dubly (31 selections between 1913 and 1925).

== Overview ==
The hosts France had been the laughing stock of the continent ever since the 1908 Olympics because, after a 2–1 win against Switzerland in March 1908, they went winless for more than three years and a half, in which they played fifteen matches, drawing one and losing the remainder, scoring 13 goals and conceding exactly 100. By the time they finally got a win against Luxembourg at the end of October 1911, this tournament was already over. It thus was no surprise that Bohemia was the great favorite to win the tournament since they had a strong side, which is confirmed by a series of very successful friendly matches against teams from Central Europe and Great Britain in 1906–08, as they only lost 0–4 at home to the full England side in June 1908 (Austria and Hungary had suffered much heavier losses). Furthermore, they had also recently defeated the Scots of Aberdeen (3–2) and Belgium in Brussels (6–1).

In the semifinals, the Northern France team was set to face England AFA on 25 May after the end of the Paris-Roubaix cycling race, while "France A" and Bohemia contested the second ticket to the final on 28 May. The French press did not believe that either of their teams could come out victorious, with L'Auto highlighting France A's lack of training as well as the absence of Denis in the midfield, stating that it "will cause our defeat", while "the Northerners, despite all their value, will have to bow to the fine AFA team". And indeed, the Northerners equalized at the restart of the second half to make it 1–1, but the English centre-forward scored the winning goal at the very end of the game. After some early saves from De Gastyne, Bělka scored the opening goal of the game in the 15th minute for the Bohemians. The French tried to equalize straight away through an attempt by Nicol, but Bohemia's keeper Pimmer intervened and on his restart, Košek, although marked from close range, doubled the lead. Chandelier cut down the deficit with a "beautiful shot from 25 meters", but the Bohemians added two goals before half-time, and after a second half that was played at a slower pace, including a few off-target attempts from Eloy and Dubly, the Bohemians sealed a 1–4 win. Pilát, who was one of three non-Slavists of the Bohemian team, played a significant role in this victory with two assists, and it could have been a hat-trick, but one goal (Košek) was disallowed by the referee.

Bohemia thus faced England AFA in the final, in which the first half ended goalless despite an attacking game, with both sides hitting the bar (Košek for Czechs), but then Bohemia scored twice in three minutes to claim a 2–1 lead, thanks to goals from Košek and Bohata. Pilát assisted both goals, deceiving the center half with his body on both occasions. The English coach decided to change 2-3-5 into 2-1-7, thus attacking with 7 players, but Bohemia's coach, John Madden, reacted by withdrawing Bohata and Holý from a 5-men attack to help out the defense, but the intense siege set up by the English resulted in a handball from a Czech player in the 83rd minute, so the referee Collier awarded a penalty kick to England, which was saved by Pimmer after Coach Madden shouted to him "BE CALM!". Bohemia then took control over the game and successfully defended their 2–1 lead to win the tournament. The Czechs thus won the European Amateur Championship after beating Belgium (6:1), France (4:1), England (2:1).

=== Results ===
Quarter-finals
Northern France
Switzerland (withdrew)
England AFA
Spain (withdrew)
France (USFSA)	Bye
25 May - Brussels
Bohemia	6
Belgium (withdrew)	1

Semi-finals
25 May - Roubaix
Northern France	1
England AFA	2
28 May - Roubaix
France (USFSA)	1
Bohemia	4

Final
29 May – Roubaix
England AFA	1
Bohemia	2

=== Semi-final ===
25 May 1911
17:00

Northern France (USFSA)	1 – 2	England AFA
46'	Report1; Report2	(1–0); 87'

Roubaix Velodrome, Roubaix, France
Attendance: 4,000
Referee: Gardner (England)

28 May 1911
16:00

France (USFSA)	1–4	Bohemia
Chandelier (1–3)	Report1; Report2; Report3	Bělka 15' (0–3); Košek 20'; Medek (0–4)

Roubaix Stadium, Roubaix, France
Attendance: 4,000

=== Final ===
29 May 1911
16:30

England AFA	1–2	Bohemia
60'	Report1; Report2; Report3	Košek 70'; Bohata 73' (Note: Some sources claim that Bělka scored both Bohemian goals.)

Roubaix Stadium, Roubaix, France
Attendance: 3,000
Referee: M. Collier (France)

== Aftermath ==
A week later, Bohemia played two exhibition games in France, beating Paris XI 5–0 and Rouen 6–3. Several thousands of football fans welcomed the amateur European champions in Prague after they arrived by train.
