= Henri Didon =

French Dominican preacher (1840–1900)

The Reverend Henri Didon OP
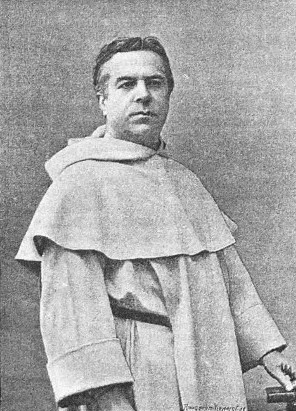
- Henri Didon (1893)
- Born: Henri Louis Rémy Didon; 17 March 1840; Auch, France
- Died: 13 March 1900 (aged 59); Toulouse, France
- Education: Pontifical University of St. Thomas Aquinas Angelicum, Rome
- Church: Catholic Church
- Ordained: 1858

Henri Louis Rémy Didon, OP (17 March 1840, in Le Touvet – 13 March 1900, in Toulouse) was a French Dominican friar. He was also a writer, educator, and a promoter of youth sports. His outsize personality often put him in conflict with his religious hierarchy.

He coined the term Citius, Altius, Fortius for an 1891 youth sports competition he organized in Arcueil and that his friend Pierre de Coubertin was assisting. The latter proposed it as the official motto of the IOC in 1894.

== Education ==
At the age of nine, Didon entered the petit séminaire du Rondeau, a religious school in Grenoble. There he studied under the French Dominican Jean-Baptiste Henri Lacordaire. Henri was successful in both academics and sports; at the age of 15, he won three titles during the "Olympic Games of Rondeau", a sports tournament held in the school every 4 years.

Didon left the seminary of Grenoble at the age of eighteen, and subsequently entered the Dominican Order. He studied at the Pontifical University of St. Thomas Aquinas Angelicum in Rome, graduating in 1862.

== Career ==
Returning to France a lector of sacred theology Didon taught Scripture for a brief time, and in 1868 began a career as a preacher in Paris. A desire to communicate his faith to others, coupled with accomplished art, enabled him to make the most of his oratorial abilities. He had strong features, a large forehead, black eyes, a vibrating voice which he perfectly controlled, and an ease in emphasizing his words by gestures. He was at his best when preaching on social subjects. He delivered the funeral oration of Archbishop Georges Darboy, of Paris, who had been shot by the Communards 24 May 1871. In the following year he preached Lenten and Advent conferences in the principal churches of Paris, many of which he published.

In 1879, critics in the press of Paris opposed Didon for the attitude he took in a series of conferences on the question of the indissolubility of marriage, which he discontinued at the request of the Archbishop of Paris, but published in book form. A year later, critics confronted him while he delivered Lenten conferences on the Church and modern society, and the accusation was made that he was in contradiction with the Syllabus. Although his preaching was orthodox, he was sent by the master general of his order to Corbara in Corsica. There for seven years he labored at a Life of Christ, leaving his retreat for an extended visit in Palestine and again for a sojourn at the University of Leipzig, University of Göttingen, and the University of Berlin. In 1887 he returned to France, where, in 1890, he completed his Life of Christ. It met with a remarkable sale and was soon translated into several languages: two English translations were made in 1891-2.

He coined the term Citius, Altius, Fortius for an 1891 youth sports competition he organized in Arcueil and that his friend Pierre de Coubertin was assisting. The latter proposed it as the official motto of the IOC in 1894.

In January 1892, Father Didon reappeared in the French pulpit when he preached in Bordeaux a religious-political sermon in favor of the Republic. He then delivered at the Madeleine in Paris a series of Lenten conferences on Jesus (tr. Belief in the Divinity of Jesus Christ, 1894). Thereafter he gave only occasional sermons and lectures, his time and energies being devoted to the education of youth. At the Dominican colleges in and near Paris, cultivating educational theories but little developed elsewhere in France, he did away with compulsion as much as possible, taught the students that discipline is the way to liberty, fostered in them a spirit of self-reliance together with a loving reverence for authority, and checked the development of a critical spirit. Some of his educational theories may be seen in his work "Les Allemands" (tr. The Germans, 1884), which is a study of the German universities with application to France; others may be found developed at length in his college addresses published in pamphlet form. The deeply religious character of Father Didon is especially manifest in his "Lettres à Mlle Th. V." (Paris, 1900), which quickly went through thirty editions and appeared in English, in his "Lettres à un ami" (Paris, 1902); and "Lettres a Mère Samuel" (Année Dominicaine, 1907-8). Besides the works mentioned above many of his sermons and addresses have been published in French and some have been done into English.
