= Jindřich Valášek =

Czech footballer (1886–1956)

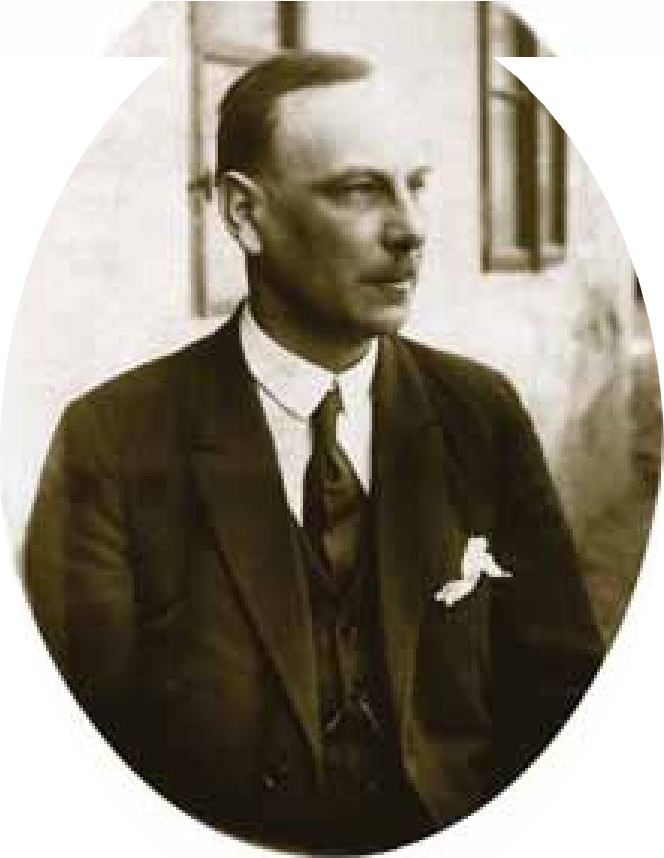
- Valášek pictured in 1916

Personal information
- Full name: Jindřich Antonín Valášek
- Date of birth: 27 June 1886
- Place of birth: Libeň, Austria-Hungary
- Date of death: 28 March 1956 (aged 69)
- Place of death: Prague, Czechoslovakia
- Position: Left winger

Youth career
- Meteor Prague

Senior career*
Years	Team	Apps	(Gls)
1905–1915	Meteor Prague		
- Sparta XI

International career
1906–1907	Bohemia	2	(1)
- * Club domestic league appearances and goals

Jindřich Antonín Valášek (27 June 1886 – 28 March 1956) was a Czech footballer who played as a left winger.

== Club career ==
During his playing career, Valášek played for Meteor Prague between 1905 and 1915. Following World War I, Valášek joined Malešice-based club Sparta XI.

== International career ==
On 1 April 1906, Valášek made his debut for Bohemia in Bohemia's second game, (Note: The April 1906 meeting is regarded as the first official game for Bohemia by the Football Association of the Czech Republic (FAČR), with a meeting between Hungary and Bohemia on 5 April 1903 subsequently being recognised as a Prague representative team by the FAČR. The Hungarian Football Federation recognises the April 1903 meeting as official for Bohemia.) scoring in a 1–1 draw against Hungary. Valášek would later make one final appearance for Bohemia, a year later against the same opposition.

=== International goals ===
Scores and results list Bohemia's goal tally first.

#	Date	Venue	Opponent	Score	Result	Competition
1	1 April 1906	Millenáris Sporttelep, Budapest, Austria-Hungary	Hungary	0–1	1–1	Friendly
