= FC Olympia Hradec Králové 1901 =

Olympia Hradec Králové
- Full name: FC Olympia Hradec Králové 1901
- Founded: 1901
- Ground: Hradec Králové, Czech Republic
- Coordinates: 50°12′14.31″N 14°47′54.82″E
- Manager: Jiří Štěpánek
- League: None (junior competitions only)
- 2016–17: Bohemian Football League, 2nd (promoted)
- Website: http://www.fcolympia.cz/
Home colours

FC Olympia Hradec Králové 1901 is a Czech football club located in Hradec Králové. It currently fields only junior sides, its senior side relocated to Prague in 2017 and became FK Olympia Prague. The club was founded in 1901. The club has taken part in the Czech Cup on numerous occasions, reaching the third round in 2008–09, before losing 5–1 at home to Bohemians 1905.

== History ==
Former club logo

The club was founded in 1901, making it the oldest football club in Hradec Králové. The team played under the name TJ Montas Hradec Králové following a name change in 1981. Olympia advanced to the Czech Fourth Division in 1995, remaining there for seven consecutive seasons. In 2001–2002, the club was relegated, followed by another relegation soon after. However, the club quickly bounced back, returning to the Regional Championship one year later, where they have competed ever since. The club relocated to Prague before the start of the 2017–18 Czech National Football League and became FK Olympia Prague.
