= Ernest Vaast =

French footballer (1922-2011)

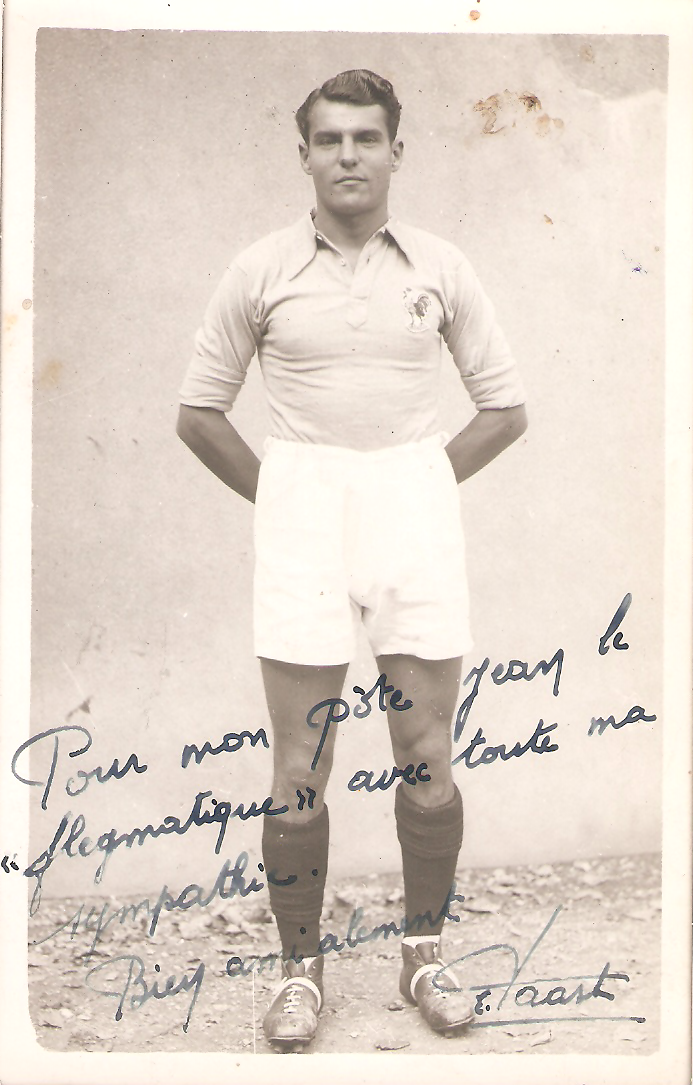

Personal information
- Full name: Ernest Vaast
- Date of birth: 28 October 1922
- Place of birth: Paris, France
- Date of death: 10 April 2011 (aged 88)
- Position: Midfielder

Senior career*
Years	Team	Apps	(Gls)
?–1944	FC Levallois		
1944–1949	RC Paris		
1949–1950	Servette		
1950–1951	RC Paris		
1951–1953	Rennes		
1953–1954	Red Star		

International career
1945–1949	France	15	(11)

Managerial career
- 1956–1959: AS Cherbourg
- 1968–1970: Rodez AF
- * Club domestic league appearances and goals

Ernest Vaast (28 October 1922 – 10 April 2011) was a French international football midfielder. He scored 11 goals in 15 matches for France and was a main player at RC Paris.
