= Johnny Madden =

Scottish footballer

John Madden
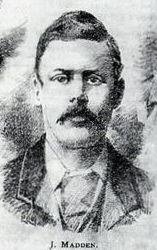

Personal information
- Full name: John William Madden
- Date of birth: 11 June 1865
- Place of birth: Dumbarton, Scotland
- Date of death: 17 April 1948 (aged 82)
- Place of death: Prague, Czechoslovakia
- Position: Winger

Youth career
- Dumbarton Albion
- 1885–1886: Dumbarton Hibernians

Senior career*
Years	Team	Apps	(Gls)
1886–1887	Dumbarton		
1886–1887	Gainsborough Trinity		
1887–1888	Grimsby Town		
1888–1889	Dumbarton		
1889–1897	Celtic	91	(37)
1897–1898	Dundee	4	(0)
1898	Tottenham Hotspur	2	(0)

International career
1893–1895	Scotland	2	(5)
1893–1896	Scottish League XI	4	(2)

Managerial career
- 1905–1930: Slavia Prague
- 1911: Bohemia
- 1919: Czechoslovakia
- * Club domestic league appearances and goals

John William Madden (11 June 1865 – 17 April 1948) was a Scottish footballer who played for Dumbarton, Gainsborough Trinity, Grimsby Town, Celtic, Dundee, Tottenham Hotspur and the Scotland national team.

== Playing career ==
Born in the Scottish town of Dumbarton to Irish parents, he played for Dumbarton FC, Dumbarton Hibernian, Tottenham Hotspurs and is best known for his time at Celtic F.C., the club of the Irish Catholic diaspora in Glasgow.

At Celtic, where he played for eight years, he won the Scottish Cup in 1892 (also losing in two other finals, adding to a defeat with Dumbarton in 1887) and the Scottish Football League title in 1892–93, 1893–94 and 1895–96, playing a leading role in their establishment as one of the leading clubs in the country, though he had been on the verge of leaving to join Sheffield Wednesday before professional contracts were officially introduced in Scottish football in 1893.

He was capped twice by Scotland in 1893 and in 1895, both against Wales. He scored four times in an 8–0 win over Wales in March 1893. He also played for Dumbartonshire (3 caps / 4 goals), Glasgow (3 caps / 1 goal) and the Scottish Football League XI (4 caps / 2 goals).

== Managerial career ==
While at Celtic, the team toured Austria and Hungary, which perhaps gave him a flavour of life on the continent. In 1905, he moved to Prague to coach SK Slavia Praha. He would remain as coach until aged 65 in 1930, in which time he established the club as one of the best teams in central Europe, particularly in the 1920s.

As the first manager (by modern standards), in Czech football, he helped the game by introducing new tactics, training and techniques, leaving a legacy at Slavia, where he is still commemorated today. Every year a group of Slavia fans visit his grave in Prague to remember him.

Madden is considered an important figure in the development of the sport in the Bohemia region (at that time another Scot, Johnny Dick, was in charge of Slavia's city rivals Sparta).

Early in his tenure, Madden won four Charity Cups (the first organized tournament in Czech lands) and became Czech champions in 1913, 1915, and 1918. He eventually lead Slavia to the Czechoslovak First League title in 1925 (the first organized national league), 1928–29, and 1929–30. His final match incharge was 3–2 defeat of their city rivals Sparta Prague. A result that meant Slavia retained the Czech title undefeated all season.

A stand at Slavia's Eden Arena is named after him, and each year a supporter group pays tribute at his grave in Prague, where he lived until his death. Madden earned the nickname “The Codger”.

He took charge of the Bohemian team during the UIAFA European Championship in 1911, defeating the AFA England team 2–1 in the final.

== International goals ==
Scores and results list Scotland's goal tally first.

#	Date	Venue	Opponent	Score	Result	Competition
1	18 March 1893	The Racecourse, Wrexham	Wales	1-0	8-0	British Home Championship
2	18 March 1893	The Racecourse, Wrexham	Wales	2-0	8-0	British Home Championship
3	18 March 1893	The Racecourse, Wrexham	Wales	6-0	8-0	British Home Championship
4	18 March 1893	The Racecourse, Wrexham	Wales	8-0	8-0	British Home Championship
5	23 March 1895	The Racecourse, Wrexham	Wales	1-1	2-2	British Home Championship

== Honours ==
=== Player ===
Dumbarton

- Scottish Cup runner-up: 1886–87
- Dumbartonshire Cup: 1888–89
- Greenock Charity Cup runner-up: 1888–89

Celtic

- Scottish league champion: 1892–93, 1893–94, 1895–96
- Scottish Cup: 1891–92
- Glasgow Cup: 1890–91, 1891–92, 1894–95, 1895–96
- Glasgow Charity Cup: 1891–92, 1892–93, 1893–94, 1894–95
- North Eastern Cup: 1889–90

=== Manager ===
Slavia Prague

- Czechoslovak First League: 1925, 1928–29, 1929–30
- Bohemian Union Championship: 1913 (Note: Commission for History and Statistics of the FAČR later recognized and awarded four league titles from the "Association League" era. Three went to Sparta (1912, 1919 and 1922) and one to Slavia (1913))
- Mistrovství/Středočeská: 1915, 1918 (Note: Domestic league or cup competition not counted by Czech FA. 1924 league was abandoned.)
- Bohemia Charity Cup: 1908, 1910, 1911, 1912
- Central Bohemian Cup: 1922, 1925–26, 1927, 1927–28, 1929–30
- Coupe des Nations runners-up: 1930
- Mitropa Cup runners-up: 1929

Bohemia / Czechoslovakia

- UIAFA European Championship: 1911
- Inter-Allied Games: 1919

== Burial plot ==
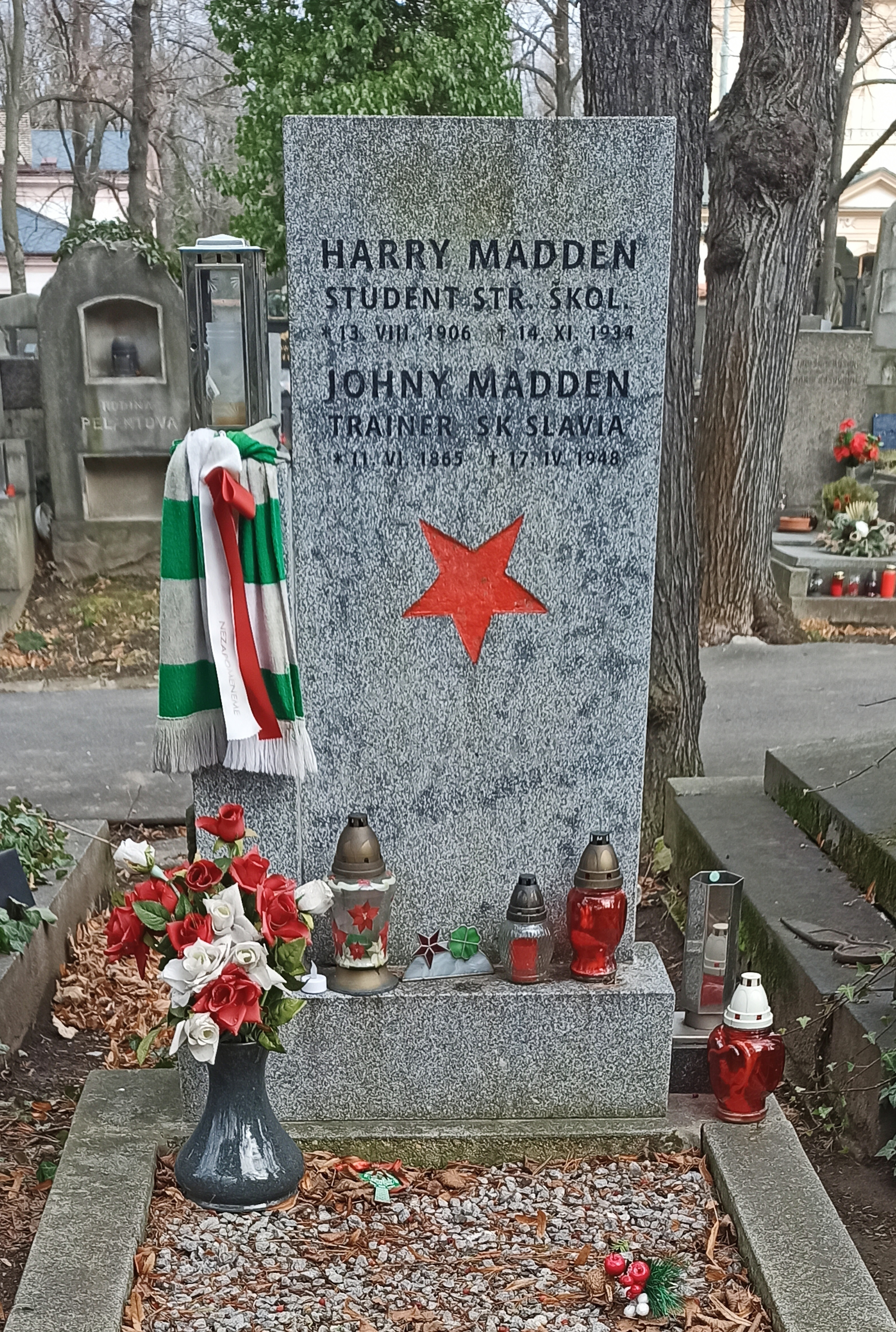
Grave of Johnny Madden

Madden is buried in the historic Olšany Cemetery, which is the main cemetery in Prague. The grave is located in Section 1 of Area 1, which is in the south east corner of the sprawling cemetery. The gravestone bears the red flag of SK Slavia Prague.

== See also ==
- List of Scotland national football team hat-tricks
