= Victor Denis (footballer) =

French footballer (1889-1972)

Personal information
- Date of birth: 12 January 1889
- Place of birth: La Gorgue, France
- Date of death: 3 March 1972 (aged 83)
- Position: Midfielder

Senior career*
Years	Team	Apps	(Gls)
1906–1909	Tourcoing		

International career
1908	France	1	(0)
- * Club domestic league appearances and goals

Victor Denis (12 January 1889 – 3 March 1972) was a French professional footballer who played as a midfielder. He made one appearance for the France national team in 1908. Denis's only match for France was a 4–1 friendly defeat to the Netherlands on 10 May 1908.
