= UIAFA =

Football Governing Body

International Amateur Association Football Union
- Union Internationale Amateur de Football Association (French)
- Abbreviation: UIAFA
- Founded: March 18, 1909
- Founded at: Paris, France
- Dissolved: 1912
- Type: Football federation
- Region served: Worldwide

The Union Internationale Amateur de Football Association (UIAFA; French for International Amateur Association Football Union) was an international governing body of association football which competed with FIFA for a short time between 1909 and 1912.

== History ==
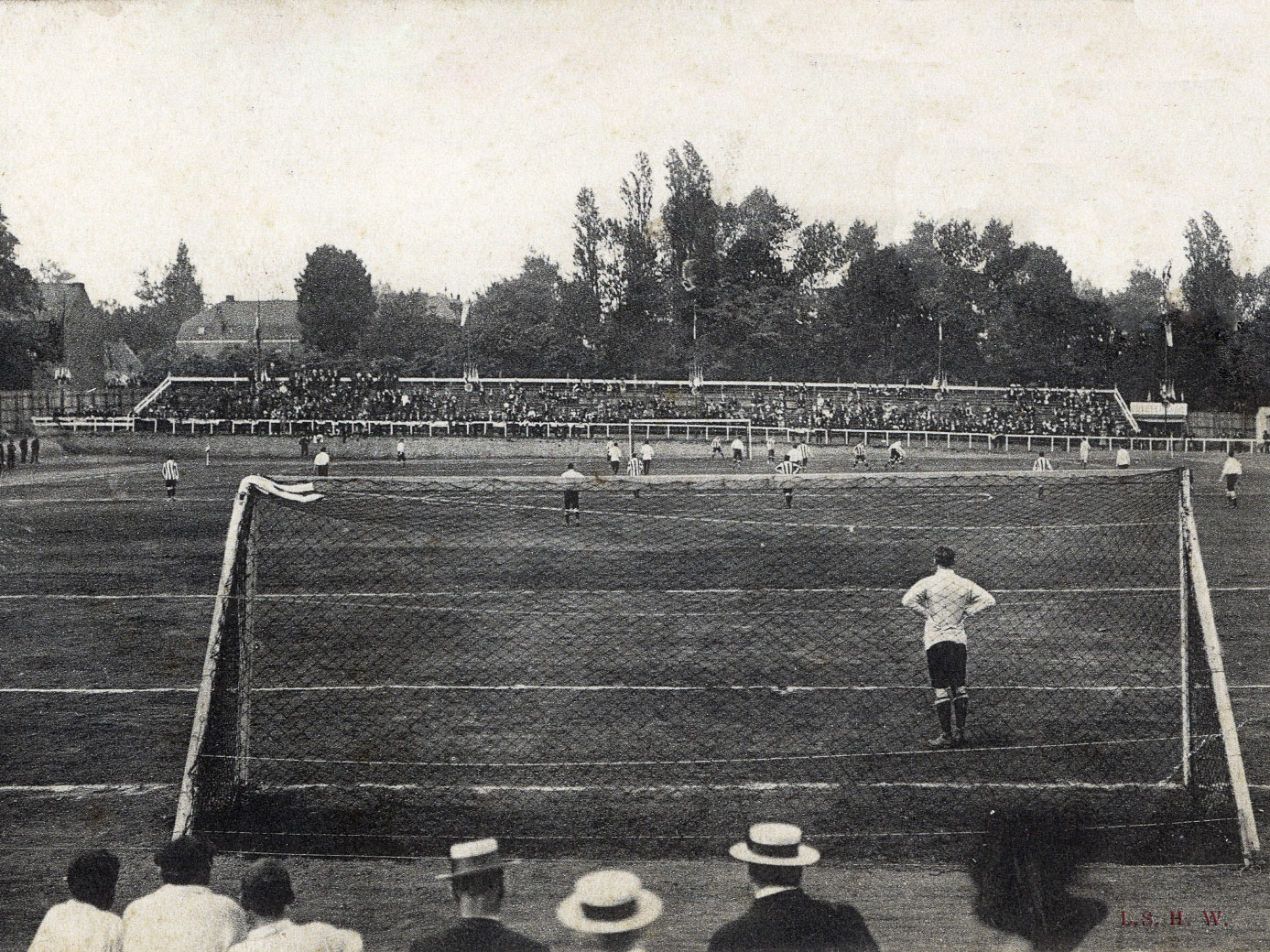
Stadium de Roubaix during the 1911 Great European Tournament.

In 1907 there was a split in English football between the Amateur Football Association (AFA) and the Football Association (FA) during the conflict between amateurism and professionalism. The AFA tried to join FIFA, but was not admitted. In solidarity, the Union des sociétés françaises de sports athlétiques (USFSA), which in that moment was the French FIFA member, left the organization, being replaced by the Comité français interfédéral (CFI).

On the other hand, in Bohemia there was the Český svaz footballový (ČSF; Czech Football Federation), which had joined FIFA in 1906, but was later expelled from the international organization on 8 June 1908 during the congress held in Vienna due to objections from the Austrian Football Association (Österreichischer Fußball-Verband, ÖFV), as Bohemia was part of the Austrian-administered territory within Austria-Hungary.

These three federations not associated with FIFA founded the UIAFA (Union internationale amateur de football Association), which was established in Paris on 18 March 1909. British Prince Arthur of Connaught was named honorary president of the organization. The first president was Victor E. Schneider, who had been vice president of FIFA. At the FIFA Congress held in Budapest in 1909, the matches between clubs of its member associations and UIAFA clubs were prohibited.

On 15 October 1909, the Federación Española de Clubs de Football (FECF; Spanish Federation of Football Clubs), a forerunner of the current RFEF, joined the UIAFA. The Fédération Belge des Sports Athlétiques (FBSA), a Belgian rebel federation, became member in February 1910. At the congress held in January 1911, a Swiss federation, the Ligue Sportive Suisse (LSS), joined the organization. Also was reported the presence of an Austrian association in the meeting. Some sources say that another two federations representing British East Africa and South America also joined UIAFA in that same congress. That same year the UIAFA organized a European championship in Roubaix during the International Exposition of the North of France. The competition was called Great European football tournament (In French Grand Tournoi européen de football) and was won by the Bohemian national team.

On 28 May 1911, the Związek Footballistów Polskich (ZFP; in English: Association of Polish Footballers) applied for membership. This was a federation formed in Austrian Galicia at the initiative of the Polish club Wisła Kraków, which had already belonged to the UIAFA since December 1910. It would become a full member at the next congress to be held in Prague in 1912. However, the UIAFA became inactive. The USFSA joined the CFI, recognized by FIFA, in December of that same year. In 1913 the Spanish FECF and its rival RUECF tried to join FIFA without success, something that was not achieved until the formation of the RFEF that same year. The English AFA finally joined the FA in 1914. Lastly, after the disintegration of Austria-Hungary and the independence of Czechoslovakia, the ČSF became the Czechoslovak Football Federation (ČSSF; Československý Svaz Footballový).

== Members ==
- (England) Amateur Football Association (AFA)
- (Bohemia) Český svaz footballový (ČSF)
- (France) Union des sociétés françaises de sports athlétiques (USFSA)
- (Spain) Federación Española de Clubs de Football (FECF)
- (Belgium) Fédération Belge des Sports Athlétiques (FBSA)
- (Switzerland) Ligue Sportive Suisse (LSS)
- (Kingdom of Galicia and Lodomeria) Związek Footballistów Polskich (ZFP)

Also it was reported the membership of an Austrian federation in the 1911 congress, and some sources say another two federations representing British East Africa and South America joined the organization in that congress.
