= France national football team results (1920–1939) =

- Win Draw Loss

This is a list of the France national football team results from 1920 to 1939.

Throughout this period they participated in three Olympic Football Tournaments in 1920, 1924, and 1928, with their performance becoming increasingly worse, as they were eliminated in the semifinals in 1920, quarter-finals in 1924, and the first-round in 1928. France also competed in three FIFA World Cups in 1930, 1934, and 1938, achieving their best performance in the last one, reaching the quarter-finals, where they were eliminated by Italy.

== 1920s ==
=== 1920 ===
18 January Friendly	Italy	9 – 4	France	Milan, Italy
	Cevenini III 7', 19'; Aebi 18', 62', 65'; Brezzi 40', 52', 84'; Carcano 66'	Report	Nicolas 24'; Bard 28', 44'; Dubly 87'	Stadium: Velodromo Sempione; Attendance: 14,000; Referee: John Forster (Switzerland)

29 February Friendly	Switzerland	0 – 2	France	Geneva, Switzerland
		Report	Dewaquez 24'; Nicolas 78'	Stadium: Charmilles Stadium; Attendance: 18,000; Referee: Giovanni Mauro (Switzerland)

28 March Friendly	France	2 – 1	Belgium	Paris, France
	Nicolas 16', 79'	Report	Vlaminck 5'	Stadium: Parc des Princes; Attendance: 18,000; Referee: Henry Child (England)

5 April Friendly	France	0 – 5	England Amateurs	Rouen, France
		Report	Hegan 22'; Sloley 46'; Harding 60', 67'; Nicholls 63'	Stadium: Stade les Bruyères; Attendance: 14,500; Referee: Charles Barette (Belgium)

28 August 1920 Summer Olympics First round	France	2–0; Awarded	Switzerland

29 August 1920 Summer Olympics Quarter-finals	France	3 – 1	Italy	Antwerp, Belgium
15:00	Boyer 10'; Nicolas 14'; Bard 54'	Report	Brezzi 33' (pen.)	Stadium: Olympic Stadium; Attendance: 10,000; Referee: Henri Christophe (Belgium)

31 August 1920 Summer Olympics Semi-finals	France	1 – 4	Czechoslovakia	Antwerp, Belgium
15:35	Boyer 79'	Report	Mazal 18', 75', 87'; Steiner 70'	Stadium: Olympic Stadium; Attendance: 12,000; Referee: Job Mutters (Netherlands)

=== 1921 ===
8 February Friendly	France	1 – 2	Ireland Amateur	Paris, France
	Hugues 65'	Report	Chambers 35'; Steele 38'	Stadium: Parc des Princes; Attendance: 20,000; Referee: Raphaël van Praag (Belgium)

20 February Friendly	France	1 – 2	Italy	Marseille, France
	Devic 22'	Report	Cevenini 55'; Santamaria 63'	Stadium: Stade de l'Huveaune; Attendance: 15,000; Referee: John Forster (Switzerland)

6 March Friendly	Belgium	3 – 1	France	Brussels, Belgium
	Bragard 52', 75' van Hege 60' (pen.)	Report	Dewaquez 63'	Stadium: Parc Duden; Attendance: 20,000; Referee: Johannes Mutters (Netherlands)

5 May Friendly	France	2 – 1	England Amateurs	Vincennes, France
	Dewaquez 6'; Boyer 67'	Report	Farnfield 9'	Stadium: Stade Pershing; Attendance: 30,000; Referee: Henri Christophe (Belgium)

23 June Unofficial friendly	Slovene XI	0 – 5	France	Ljubljana, Yugoslavia
		Report		Stadium: Ilirija Stadium; Attendance: 4,000

26 June Unofficial friendly	Zagreb XI	2 – 1	France	Zagreb, Yugoslavia
	Červený; Vragović	Report	Nicolas	Stadium: Maksimir Stadium

28 June Unofficial friendly	Zagreb XI	4 – 2	France	Zagreb, Yugoslavia
		Report		Stadium: Maksimir Stadium

3 July Unofficial friendly	Belgrade XI	0 – 3	France	Belgrade, Yugoslavia
18:00		Report		Stadium: SK Jugoslavija Stadium

13 November Friendly	France	0 – 5	Netherlands	Vincennes, France
		Report	van Gendt 30', 52', 87'; Rodermond 69', 85'	Stadium: Stade Pershing; Attendance: 30,000; Referee: Henri Christophe (Belgium)

=== 1922 ===
15 January Friendly	France	2 – 1	Belgium	Colombes, France
	Darques 50'; Dewaquez 67'	Report	Michel 35'	Stadium: Stade Olympique Yves-du-Manoir; Attendance: 20,000; Referee: M. Edwards (England)

30 April Friendly	France	0 – 4	Spain	Bordeaux, France
		Report	Alcántara 18', 20'; Travieso 40', 42'	Stadium: Stade Sainte-Germaine; Attendance: 10,000; Referee: Raphaël van Praag (Belgium)

11 June Friendly	Norway	7 – 0	France	Oslo, Norway
	Gundersen 3', 61', 68', 75'; Andersen 30'; Wilhelms 51', 80'	Report		Stadium: Gressbanen; Attendance: 14,000; Referee: Ejner Ullrich (Denmark)

=== 1923 ===
28 January Friendly	Spain	3 – 0	France	San Sebastián, Spain
	Monjardín 15', 78'; Zabala 42'	Report		Stadium: Atotxa Stadium; Attendance: 15,000; Referee: Charles Barette (Belgium)

25 February Friendly	Belgium	4 – 1	France	Brussels, Belgium
	Gillis 28', 77'; Larnoe 36', 61'	Report	Isbecque 57'	Stadium: Parc Duden; Attendance: 27,000; Referee: M. Newman (England)

2 April Friendly	Netherlands	8 – 1	France	Amsterdam, Netherlands
	Roetert 1', 18' van Linge 15', 55'; Bulder 44', 86'; Addicks 53', 81'	Report	Bard 82'	Stadium: Sportpark Amsterdam; Attendance: 30,000; Referee: Ejner Ullrich (Denmark)

22 April Friendly	France	2 – 2	Switzerland	Vincennes, France
	Dubly 37'; Nicolas 61'	Report	Afflerbach 17', 27'	Stadium: Stade Pershing; Attendance: 20,000; Referee: M. Musther (England)

10 May Friendly	France	1 – 4	England	Vincennes, France
	Dewaquez 89'	Report	Mony 9' (o.g.); Buchan 35'; Hartley 55'; Creek 84'	Stadium: Stade Pershing; Attendance: 30,000; Referee: Charles Barette (Belgium)

28 November Friendly	France	0 – 2	Norway	Paris, France
		Report	Wilhelms 12'; Berstad 18'	Stadium: Parc des Princes; Attendance: 12,000; Referee: M. Walton (England)

=== 1924 ===
13 January Friendly	France	2 – 0	Belgium	Paris, France
	Gross 43'; Rénier 49'	Report		Stadium: Stade Buffalo; Attendance: 30,000; Referee: Thomas Small (Scotland)

23 March Friendly	Switzerland	3 – 0	France	Geneva, Switzerland
	Kramer 8'; Dietrich 9'; Pache 60'	Report		Stadium: Charmilles Stadium; Attendance: 15,000; Referee: M. Meazza (Italy)

17 May Friendly	France	1 – 3	England	Vincennes, France
	Dewaquez 58'	Report	Gibbins 25', 40'; Baumann 83' (o.g.)	Stadium: Stade Pershing; Attendance: 20,000; Referee: Willem Eymers (Netherlands)

27 May 1924 Summer Olympics	France	7 – 0	Latvia	Saint-Ouen, France
	Crut 17', 28', 55'; Nicolas 25', 50'; Boyer 71', 87'	Report		Stadium: Stade de Paris; Attendance: 15,000; Referee: Henri Christophe (Belgium)

1 June 1924 Summer Olympics	France	1 – 5	Uruguay	Coombes, France
	Nicolas 12'	Report	Scarone 2', 24'; Petrone 58', 68'; Romano 83'	Stadium: Stade Olympique Yves-du-Manoir; Attendance: 45,000; Referee: Lauritz Andersen (Denmark)

4 June Friendly	France	0 – 1	Hungary	Le Havre, France
		Report	Eisenhoffer 25'	Stadium: Stade Jules Deschaseaux; Attendance: 6,000; Referee: Felix Herren (Switzerland)

11 November Friendly	Belgium	3 – 0	France	Molenbeek, Belgium
	Braine 2'; Despae 47', 52'	Report		Stadium: Stade Fallon; Attendance: 27,000; Referee: Ruben Gelbord (Sweden)

=== 1925 ===
22 March Friendly	Italy	7 – 0	France	Turin, Italy
	Conti 4'; Baloncieri 47', 59'; Levratto 52', 88'; Moscardini 60', 78'	Report		Stadium: Stadio di Corso Marsiglia; Attendance: 15,000; Referee: Heinrich Retschury (Austria)

19 April Friendly	France	0 – 4	Austria	Vincennes, France
		Report	Swatosch 11', 28'; Wieser 23'; Cutti 65'	Stadium: Stade Pershing; Attendance: 25,000; Referee: M. Scamoni (Italy)

21 May Friendly	France	2 – 3	England	Colombes, France
	Boyer 62'; Dewaquez 75'	Report	Gibbins 23'; Bonnardel 46' (o.g.); Dorrell 50'	Stadium: Stade Olympique Yves-du-Manoir; Attendance: 35,000; Referee: Theo van Zwieteren (Netherlands)

=== 1926 ===
11 April Friendly	France	4 – 3	Belgium	Vincennes, France
	Dewaquez 17'; Crut 33', 59'; Leveugle 40'	Report	van der Bauwhede 60'; Thys 82'; Devos 89'	Stadium: Stade Pershing; Attendance: 23,000; Referee: Albert Prince-Cox (England)

18 April Friendly	France	4 – 2	Portugal	Toulouse, France
	Salvano 16'; Brunel 40', 65'; Bonello 56'	Report	Silva 35'; João Santos 86'	Stadium: Ponts Jumeaux; Attendance: 16,000; Referee: E. Dizerens (Switzerland)

25 April Friendly	France	1 – 0	Switzerland	Colombes, France
	Nicolas 12'	Report		Stadium: Stade Olympique Yves-du-Manoir; Attendance: 15,000; Referee: M. Bellini (Italy)

30 May Friendly	Austria	4 – 1	France	Vienna, Austria
	Villaplane 42' (o.g.); Wessely 61', 89'; Juranitsch 65'	Report	Crut 11'	Stadium: Simmeringer Platz; Attendance: 30,000; Referee: Frantisek Cejnar (Czechoslovakia)

13 June Friendly	France	4 – 1	Yugoslavia	Colombes, France
	Gallay 16'; Nicolas 17', 37', 61'	Report	Bonačić 25'	Stadium: Stade Olympique Yves-du-Manoir; Attendance: 12,000; Referee: Paul Putz (Belgium)

20 June Friendly	Belgium	2 – 2	France	Molenbeek, Belgium
	Gillis 32'; Adams 71'	Report	Accard 3'; Dewaquez 89'	Stadium: Stade Fallon; Attendance: 35,000; Referee: M. Lucas (England)

=== 1927 ===
16 March Friendly	Portugal	4 – 0	France	Lisbon, Portugal
	Wallet 10' (o.g.); Soares 30'; Martins 49', 75'	Report		Stadium: Estádio do Lumiar; Attendance: 15,000; Referee: Luis Collina (Spain)

24 April Friendly	France	3 – 3	Italy	Paris, France
	Taisne 16', 52'; Sottiault 89'	Report	Libonatti 29', 36'; Conti 73'	Stadium: Colombes; Attendance: 35,000; Referee: Albert Prince-Cox (England)

22 May Friendly	France	1 – 4	Spain	Paris, France
	Boyer 22'	Report	Zaldúa 23' (pen.), 75' (pen.); Yermo 27'; Olaso 68'	Stadium: Colombes; Attendance: 25,000; Referee: Arthur Kingscott (England)

26 May Friendly	France	0 – 6	England	Paris, France
		Report	G. Brown 4', 50'; Dean 24', 75'; Rollet 55' (o.g.); Rigby 87'	Stadium: Colombes; Attendance: 25,000; Referee: Henri Maeck

12 June Friendly	Hungary	13 – 1	France	Budapest, Hungary
	Takács 17', 41', 60', 79', 83', 85'; Orth 25', 26'; Skvarek 30', 88'; Kohut 32', 62'; Dewaquez 76' (o.g.)	Report	Dewaquez 80'	Attendance: 28,000; Referee: Heinrich Retschury (Austria)

=== 1928 ===
21 February Friendly	France	4 – 0	Ireland	Montrouge, France
	Nicolas 8', 27', 35'; Ouvray 88'	Report		Stadium: Stade Buffalo; Attendance: 27,000; Referee: Paul Ruoff (Switzerland)

11 March Friendly	Switzerland	4 – 3	France	Lausanne, Switzerland
	Jäggi 18', 22', 49'; Romberg 40'	Report	Lieb 60'; Seyler 80'; Nicolas 89'	Stadium: Stade Olympique de la Pontaise; Referee: Johannes Mutters (Netherlands)

15 April Friendly	France	2 – 3	Belgium	Paris, France
	Bardot 44', 66'	Report	Voorhoof 5'; R. Braine 26', 73'	Stadium: Colombes; Attendance: 25,000; Referee: Albert Prince-Cox (England)

29 April Friendly	France	1 – 1	Portugal	Paris, France
	Nicolas 44'	Report	A. Martins 24'	Stadium: Parc des Princes; Attendance: 25,000; Referee: Stanley Rous (England)

13 May Friendly	France	0 – 2	Czechoslovakia	Paris, France
		Report	Puč 2', 60'	Stadium: Colombes; Attendance: 19,000; Referee: Henri Christophe (Belgium)

17 May Friendly	France	1 – 5	England	Paris, France
	Langiller 2'	Report	Stephenson 21', 80'; Jack 23'; Dean 27', 64'	Stadium: Colombes; Attendance: 40,000; Referee: Adolf Miesz

29 May 1928 Summer Olympics; First Round	France	3 – 4	Italy	Amsterdam, Netherlands
	Brouzes 15', 17'; Dauphin 61'	Report	Rossetti 19'; Levratto 39'; Banchero 43'; Baloncieri 60'	Stadium: Olympic Stadium; Attendance: 8,000; Referee: Henri Christophe (Belgium)

=== 1929 ===
24 February Friendly	France	3 – 0	Hungary	Paris, France
	Banide 23'; Nicolas 25'; Lieb 33' (pen.)	Report		Stadium: Colombes; Attendance: 20,000; Referee: Paul Ruoff (Switzerland)

24 March Friendly	France	2 – 0	Portugal	Paris, France
	Nicolas 49'; Galey 80'	Report		Stadium: Colombes; Attendance: 25,000; Referee: Raphael Van Praag (Belgium)

14 April Friendly	Spain	8 – 1	France	Saragossa, Spain
	Bienzobas 6'; Rubio 40', 60' (pen.), 77', 81'; Yurrita 56'; Goiburu 73', 80'	Report	Veinante 86'	Stadium: Estadio Torrero; Attendance: 15,000; Referee: Albert Prince-Cox (England)

9 May Friendly	France	1 – 4	England	Paris, France
	Dewaquez 54'	Report	Kail 35'; Camsell 59', 86'; Bradford 68'	Stadium: Colombes; Attendance: 35,000; Referee: Louis Baert (Belgium)

19 May Friendly	France	1 – 3	Yugoslavia	Paris, France
	Cheuva 63'	Report	Hitrec 25'; Bertrand 39' (o.g.); Lajnert 75'	Stadium: Colombes; Attendance: 15,000; Referee: Paul Ruoff (Switzerland)

26 May Friendly	Belgium	4 – 1	France	Rocourt, Belgium
	Van der Bauwhede 6'; R. Braine 10'; Bastin 49', 74'	Report	Dewaquez 81'	Stadium: Stade Vélodrome de Rocourt; Attendance: 20,000; Referee: René Mercet (Switzerland)

== 1930s ==
=== 1930 ===
23 February Friendly	Portugal	2 – 0	France	Oporto, Portugal
	Soares 44', 70'	Report		Stadium: Campo do Ameal; Attendance: 20,000; Referee: John Langenus (Belgium)

23 March Friendly	France	3 – 3	Switzerland	Paris, France
	Cheuva 17'; Anatol 34'; Libérati 58'	Report	Lehmann 10', 13'; Romberg 68'	Stadium: Colombes; Attendance: 20,000; Referee: Stanley Rous (England)

13 April Friendly	France	1 – 6	Belgium	Paris, France
	Dubus 44'	Report	Versyp 12', 36'; Adams 14'; Van der Bauwhede 16', 32', 83'	Stadium: Colombes; Attendance: 18,000; Referee: Paul Ruoff (Switzerland)

11 May Friendly	France	2 – 3	Czechoslovakia	Paris, France
	Korb 25' (pen.); Delfour 30'	Report	Košťálek 6'; Svoboda 17'; Junek 76'	Stadium: Colombes; Attendance: 28,000; Referee: John Langenus (Belgium)

18 May Friendly	France	0 – 2	Scotland	Paris, France
		Report	Gallacher 42', 85'	Stadium: Colombes; Attendance: 25,000; Referee: Raphael Van Praag (Belgium)

25 May Friendly	Belgium	1 – 2	France	Liège, Belgium
	Voorhoof 21'	Report	Pinel 26', 72'	Stadium: Stade du Pont d'Ougrée; Attendance: 11,000; Referee: Gustav Ekberg (Sweden)

13 July 1930 FIFA World Cup; Group 1	France	4 – 1	Mexico	Montevideo, Uruguay
	Laurent 19'; Langiller 40'; Maschinot 42', 87'	Report	Carreño 70'	Stadium: Estadio Pocitos; Attendance: 4,000; Referee: Domingo Lombardi (Uruguay)

15 July 1930 FIFA World Cup; Group 1	Argentina	1 – 0	France	Montevideo, Uruguay
	Monti 81'	Report		Stadium: Parque Central; Attendance: 38,000; Referee: Gilberto de Almeida Rêgo (Brazil)

19 July 1930 FIFA World Cup; Group 1	Chile	1 – 0	France	Montevideo, Uruguay
	Subiabre 64'	Report		Stadium: Estadio Centenario; Attendance: 48,000; Referee: Aníbal Tejada (Uruguay)

1 August Friendly	Brazil	3 – 2	France	Rio de Janeiro, Brazil
	Domingues 27', 49'; Friedenreich 41'	Report	Delfour 7', 19'	Referee: L. Moraes de Castro

7 December Friendly	France	2 – 2	Belgium	Montrouge, France
	Pinel 3', 67'	Report	Van Beeck 7'; Voorhoof 64'	Stadium: Stade Buffalo; Attendance: 20,000; Referee: René Mercet (Switzerland)

=== 1931 ===
25 January Friendly	Italy	5 – 0	France	Bologna, Italy
	Meazza 21', 34', 40'; Cesarini 52'; Cattaneo 73'	Report		Stadium: Stadio Littoriale; Attendance: 48,000; Referee: Paul Ruoff (Switzerland)

15 February Friendly	France	1 – 2	Czechoslovakia	Paris, France
	Langiller 23' (pen.)	Report	Novák 5' (pen.), 84' (pen.)	Stadium: Colombes; Attendance: 28,000; Referee: John Langenus (Belgium)

15 March Friendly	France	1 – 0	Germany	Paris, France
	Münzenberg 15' (o.g.)	Report		Stadium: Colombes; Attendance: 40,076; Referee: Thomas Crewe (England)

14 May Friendly	France	5 – 2	England	Paris, France
	Laurent 15'; Mercier 18', 76'; Langiller 29'; Defour 57'	Report	Crooks 10'; Waring 71'	Stadium: Colombes; Attendance: 35,000; Referee: John Langenus (Belgium)

29 November Friendly	France	3 – 4	Netherlands	Paris, France
	Mercier 7'; Veinante 53', 68'	Report	Lagendaal 12', 22', 23'; Mol 24'	Stadium: Colombes; Attendance: 25,000; Referee: Paul Ruoff (Switzerland)

=== 1932 ===
20 March Friendly	Switzerland	3 – 3	France	Bern, Switzerland
	M. Abegglen 22'; A. Abegglen 36', 87'	Report	Liberati 15'; Veinante 69'; Bardot 71'	Stadium: Stadion Neufeld; Attendance: 18,000; Referee: Stanley Rous (England)

10 April Friendly	France	1 – 2	Italy	Paris, France
	Liberati 11'	Report	Magnozzi 43'; Costantino 52'	Stadium: Colombes; Attendance: 45,000; Referee: René Mercet (Switzerland)

1 May Friendly	Belgium	5 – 2	France	Brussels, Belgium
	Brichaut 23'; Vanden Eynde 25', 61'; Capelle 38'; Van Beeck 46'	Report	Pavillard 48'; Sécember 82'	Stadium: Heysel Stadium; Attendance: 45,000; Referee: Heinrich Retschury (Austria)

8 May Friendly	France	1 – 3	Scotland	Paris, France
	Langiller 43' (pen.)	Report	Dewar 14', 27', 40'	Stadium: Colombes; Attendance: 8,000; Referee: Albino Carraro (Italy)

5 June Friendly	Yugoslavia	2 – 1	France	Belgrade, Yugoslavia
	Glišović 26', 58'	Report	Alcazar 1'	Stadium: Beogradski Stadion; Attendance: 10,000; Referee: František Cejnar (Czechoslovakia)

9 June Friendly	Bulgaria	3 – 5	France	Sofia, Bulgaria
	Panchev 51', 63', 86' (pen.)	Report	Rodriguez 1'; Sécember 6', 16', 28', 47'	Stadium: Yunak Stadium; Attendance: 6,000; Referee: Josip Fabris (Yugoslavia)

12 June Friendly	Romania	6 – 3	France	Bucharest, Romania
	Bodola 10', 81'; Wetzer 17', 68'; Schwartz 20', 46'	Report	Chardar 63' (pen.); Rolhion 75', 77'	Stadium: Stadionul Republicii; Attendance: 10,000; Referee: Mihály Ivanicsics (Hungary)

=== 1933 ===
12 February Friendly	France	0 – 4	Austria	Paris, France
		Report	Sindelar 66'; Zischek 70'; Weselik 72'; Vogl 84'	Stadium: Parc des Princes; Attendance: 37,459; Referee: John Langenus (Belgium)

19 March Friendly	Germany	3 – 3	France	Berlin, Germany
	Rohr 28', 45'; Lachner 65'	Report	Rio 22'; Gérard 81', 83'	Stadium: Deutsches Stadion; Attendance: 55,000; Referee: Thomas Crewe (England)

26 March Friendly	France	3 – 0	Belgium	Paris, France
	Rio 34'; Langiller 74'; Nicolas 81'	Report		Stadium: Colombes; Attendance: 30,000; Referee: Stanley Rous (England)

23 April Friendly	France	1 – 0	Spain	Paris, France
	Nicolas 32'	Report		Stadium: Colombes; Attendance: 40,000

25 May Friendly	France	1 – 1	Wales	Paris, France
	Nicolas 78'	Report	Griffiths 57'	Stadium: Colombes; Attendance: 25,000; Referee: Raphaël Van Praag (Belgium)

10 June Friendly	Czechoslovakia	4 – 0	France	Prague, Czechoslovakia
	Puč 20'; Junek 47'; Svoboda 59'; Nejedlý 63'	Report		Stadium: Stadion Letná; Attendance: 18,000

6 December Friendly	England	4 – 1	France	London, England
	Camsell 14', 41'; Brook 21'; Grosvenor 53'	Report	Veinante 78'	Stadium: White Hart Lane; Attendance: 17,097; Referee: John Langenus (Belgium)

=== 1934 ===
21 January Friendly	Belgium	2 – 3	France	Brussels, Belgium
	Voorhoof 8'; Vanden Eynde 11'	Report	Nicolas 3', 54'; Veinante 37'	Stadium: Heysel Stadium; Attendance: 35,826; Referee: Walter Lewington (England)

11 March Friendly	France	0 – 1	Switzerland	Paris, France
		Report	Kielholz 35'	Stadium: Parc des Princes; Attendance: 25,000; Referee: Rinaldo Barlassini (Italy)

25 March Friendly	France	1 – 2	Czechoslovakia	Paris, France
	Korb 6'	Report	Svoboda 37'; Sobotka 89'	Stadium: Colombes; Attendance: 27,931; Referee: Walter Lewington (England)

15 April 1934 FIFA World Cup; Qualifying Group 8	Luxembourg	1 – 6	France	Luxembourg City, Luxembourg
	Speicher 47'	Report	Aston 3'; Nicolas 26', 67', 85', 89' (pen.); Liberati 80'	Stadium: Stade Municipale; Attendance: 18,000; Referee: Marc Turfkruyer (Belgium)

10 May Friendly	Netherlands	4 – 5	France	Amsterdam, Netherlands
	Vente 4'; Bakhuys 7', 12'; Smit 32'	Report	Keller 13'; Nicolas 21', 25', 76'; Alcazar 39'	Stadium: Olympic Stadium; Attendance: 35,000

27 May 1934 FIFA World Cup; First round	Austria	3 – 2 a.e.t.	France	Turin, Italy
	Sindelar 45'; Schall 93'; Bican 109'	Report	Nicolas 18'; Verriest 115' (pen.)	Stadium: Stadio Municipale Benito Mussolini; Attendance: 15,000; Referee: Johannes Van Moorsel (Netherlands)

16 December Friendly	France	3 – 2	Yugoslavia	Paris, France
	Nicolas 12', 86'; Courtois 88'	Report	Marjanović 44'; Vujadinović 84'	Stadium: Parc des Princes; Attendance: 37,000; Referee: Louis Baert (Belgium)

=== 1935 ===
24 January Friendly	Spain	2 – 0	France	Madrid, Spain
	Regueiro 15'; Hilario 75'	Report		Stadium: Estadio Chamartín; Attendance: 25,000; Referee: Walter Lewington (England)

17 February Friendly	Italy	2 – 1	France	Rome, Italy
	Meazza 4', 15'	Report	Keller 26'	Stadium: Stadio Nazionale PNF; Attendance: 23,000; Referee: Louis Baert (Belgium)

17 March Friendly	France	1 – 3	Germany	Paris, France
	Duhart 59'	Report	Lehner 36'; Kobierski 51'; Hohmann 88'	Stadium: Parc des Princes; Attendance: 38,483; Referee: Louis Baert (Belgium)

14 April Friendly	Belgium	1 – 1	France	Brussels, Belgium
	Van Beeck 63'	Report	Courtois 20'	Stadium: Heysel Stadium; Attendance: 35,000

19 May Friendly	France	2 – 0	Hungary	Paris, France
	Courtois 37', 72'	Report		Stadium: Colombes; Attendance: 25,000; Referee: Walter Lewington (England)

27 October Friendly	Switzerland	2 – 1	France	Geneva, Switzerland
	A. Abegglen 41'; Jäggi 56'	Report	Weiler 4' (o.g.)	Stadium: Charmilles Stadium; Attendance: 25,000; Referee: Walter Lewington (England)

10 November Friendly	France	2 – 0	Sweden	Paris, France
	Berg 33' (o.g.); Courtois 70'	Report		Stadium: Parc des Princes; Attendance: 26,905; Referee: Arthur Barton (England)

=== 1936 ===
12 January Friendly	France	1 – 6	Netherlands	Paris, France
	Courtois 64'	Report	Bakhuys 4', 50', 61'; Wels 34'; Drok 84' van Nellen 86'	Stadium: Parc des Princes; Attendance: 30,000; Referee: George Rudd (England)

9 February Friendly	France	0 – 3	Czechoslovakia	Paris, France
		Report	Puč 14'; Bouček 20'; Nejedlý 35'	Stadium: Parc des Princes; Attendance: 40,138; Referee: Pedro Escartín (Spain)

8 March Friendly	France	3 – 0	Belgium	Paris, France
	Courtois 37', 54'; Rio 48'	Report		Stadium: Colombes; Attendance: 30,000; Referee: Peco Bauwens (Germany)

13 December Friendly	France	1 – 0	Yugoslavia	Paris, France
	Keller 19'	Report		Stadium: Parc des Princes; Attendance: 32,903; Referee: Rinaldo Barlassina (Italy)

=== 1937 ===
12 January Friendly	France	1 – 2	Austria	Paris, France
	Novicki 42'	Report	Stroh 39' (pen.); Binder 83'	Stadium: Parc des Princes; Attendance: 37,898; Referee: Arthur Barton (England)

21 February Friendly	Belgium	3 – 1	France	Brussels, Belgium
	Braine 43'; Ceuleers 65'; Vanden Eynde 78'	Report	Rio 12'	Stadium: Heysel Stadium; Attendance: 37,668; Referee: Hans Boekman (Netherlands)

21 March Friendly	Germany	4 – 0	France	Stuttgart, Germany
	Lehner 26'; Urban 31', 76'; Lenz 87'	Report		Stadium: Adolf-Hitler-Kampfbahn; Attendance: 72,000; Referee: Rinaldo Barlassina (Italy)

23 May Friendly	France	0 – 2	Ireland	Paris, France
		Report	Jordan 51'; Brown 58'	Stadium: Colombes; Attendance: 16,688; Referee: Augustin Krist (Czechoslovakia)

10 October Friendly	France	2 – 1	Switzerland	Paris, France
	Veinante 41', 82'	Report	Rupf 66'	Stadium: Parc des Princes; Attendance: 36,730; Referee: John Langenus (Belgium)

31 October Friendly	Netherlands	2 – 3	France	Amsterdam, Netherlands
	Smit 56', 87'	Report	Nicolas 12'; Langiller 48'; Courtois 73'	Stadium: Olympic Stadium; Attendance: 44,000

5 December Friendly	France	0 – 0	Italy	Paris, France
		Report		Stadium: Parc des Princes; Attendance: 39,046; Referee: Hans Wuthrich (Switzerland)

=== 1938 ===
30 January Friendly	France	5 – 3	Belgium	Paris, France
	Courtois 8'; Veinante 41', 51'; Heisserer 47'; Kowalczyk 78'	Report	Braine 22'; Voorhoof 28'; Vanden Eynde 76'	Stadium: Parc des Princes; Attendance: 39,000; Referee: Arthur Jewell (England)

24 March Friendly	France	6 – 1	Bulgaria	Paris, France
	Nicolas 6', 87'; Aston 29', 52'; Aznar 79'; Veinante 83'	Report	Jordan 67' (o.g.)	Stadium: Parc des Princes; Attendance: 28,512; Referee: Walter Lewington (England)

26 May Friendly	France	2 – 4	England	Paris, France
	Jordan 32'; Nicolas 36'	Report	Broome 6'; Drake 34', 40'; Bastin 85' (pen.)	Stadium: Colombes; Attendance: 45,168; Referee: Louis Baert (Belgium)

5 June 1938 FIFA World Cup; First round	France	3 – 1	Belgium	Paris, France
	Veinante 1'; Nicolas 11', 69'	Report	Isemborghs 19'	Stadium: Colombes; Attendance: 30,454; Referee: Hans Wuthrich (Switzerland)

12 June 1938 FIFA World Cup; Quarter-finals	France	1 – 3	Italy	Paris, France
	Heisserer 8'	Report	Colaussi 7'; Piola 52', 72'	Stadium: Colombes; Attendance: 58,455; Referee: Louis Baert (Belgium)

4 December Friendly	Italy	1 – 0	France	Naples, Italy
	Biavati 32'	Report		Stadium: Stadio Partenopeo; Attendance: 40,000; Referee: John Langenus (Belgium)

=== 1939 ===
22 January Friendly	France	4 – 0	Poland	Paris, France
	Veinante 16', 57'; Heisserer 41'; Zatelli 70'	Report		Stadium: Parc des Princes; Attendance: 35,000

16 March Friendly	France	2 – 2	Hungary	Paris, France
	Benbarek 15'; Heisserer 87'	Report	Kiszely 17', 56'	Stadium: Parc des Princes; Attendance: 27,367; Referee: Walter Lewington (England)

18 May Friendly	Belgium	1 – 3	France	Brussels, Belgium
	Lamoot 62'	Report	Koranyi 28', 85'; Mathé 48'	Stadium: Heysel Stadium; Attendance: 35,793

21 May Friendly	France	2 – 1	Wales	Paris, France
	Bigot 10'; Koranyi 13'	Report	Astley 53'	Stadium: Colombes; Attendance: 23,064; Referee: Laurent Franken (Belgium)
