= 1928 Coupe de France final =

- Event: 1927–28 Coupe de France
Red Star	CA Paris
3	1
- Date: 6 May 1928
- Venue: Olympique Yves-du-Manoir, Colombes
- Referee: Georges Balvay
- Attendance: 30,000

The 1928 Coupe de France final was a football match held at Stade Olympique Yves-du-Manoir, Colombes on May 6, 1928, that saw Red Star Olympique defeat CA Paris 3–1 thanks to goals by Paul Wartel, Brenna Egil Lund and Juste Brouzes.

== Match details ==
6 May 1928

Red Star	3–1	CA Paris
Wartel 8'; Lund 33'; Brouzes 61'		Bertrand 45'

Stade Olympique Yves-du-Manoir, Colombes
Attendance: 30,000
Referee: Georges Balvay

GK	(France) René Espanet
DF	(Uruguay) Orestes Diaz
DF	(France) Marcel Domergue (c)
DF	(France) Augustin Chantrel
DF	(France) Paul Baron
MF	(France) Paul Wartel
MF	(Norway) Brenna Egil Lund
FW	(France) Juste Brouzes
FW	(France) Paul Nicolas
FW	(France) Paul Martin
FW	(France) René Lebreton
Manager:
? Assistant Referees: Fourth Official:

GK	(France) Armand Blanc
DF	(France) Jean Fidon
DF	(France) Albert Ottavis
DF	(France) Jean Laurent
DF	(France) Jean Gautheroux
MF	(France) René Quentier (c)
MF	(France) Georges Ouvray
FW	(France) Lucien Laurent
FW	(France) Pierre Bertrand
FW	(France) Marcel Langiller
FW	(France) Roland Mahieu
Manager:
?

== See also ==
- 1927–28 Coupe de France
