= Jean Fidon =

French footballer (1906–1992)

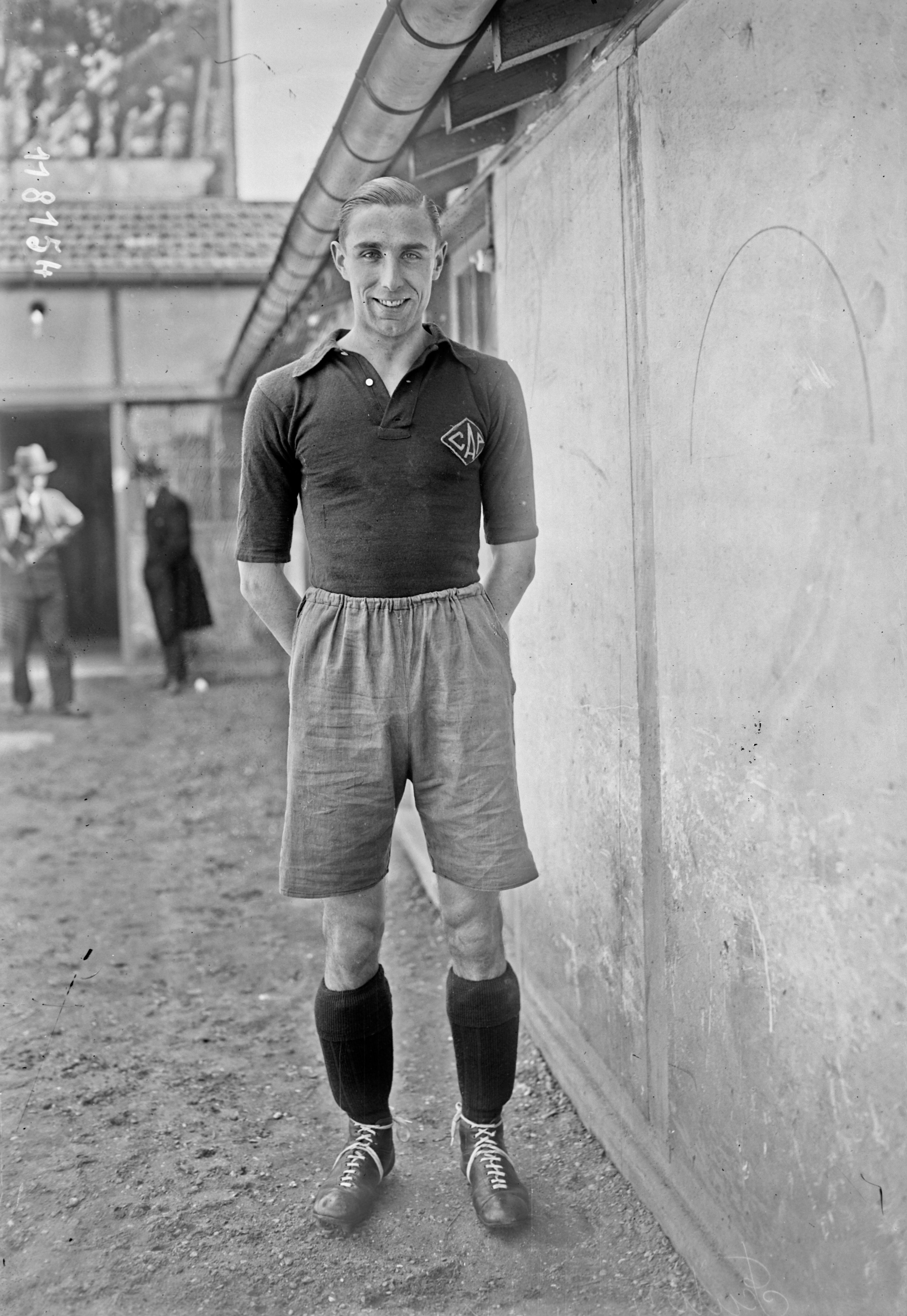
- Fidon in 1927

Personal information
- Full name: Jean Georges Fidon
- Date of birth: 1 June 1906
- Place of birth: Meaux, Seine-et-Marne, France
- Date of death: 16 August 1992 (aged 86)
- Place of death: Saint-Germain-en-Laye, France
- Position: Midfielder

Senior career*
Years	Team	Apps	(Gls)
1926–1934	CA Paris		
1934–1935	Amiens		

International career
1927	France	1	(0)
- * Club domestic league appearances and goals

Jean Georges Fidon (1 June 1906 – 16 August 1992) was a French footballer who played as a midfielder for CA Paris and the French national team in the late 1920s.

== Playing career ==
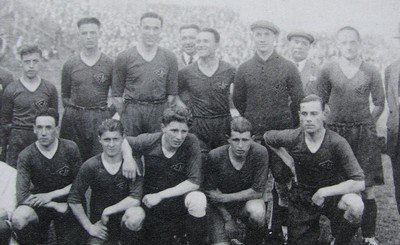
Fidon (standing, third from left) with the CA Paris team that played in the 1928 Coupe de France final.

Born in the Seine-et-Marne town of Meaux on 1 June 1906, Fidon began his football career at CA Paris in 1926, aged 18. Together with René Quentier, Marcel Langiller, and the Laurent brothers (Jean and Lucien), he was a member of the CA Paris team that reached the 1928 Coupe de France final at Colombes on 6 May, which ended in a 3–1 loss to Red Star. On the following day, the journalists of the French newspaper Le Miroir des sports stated that "Fidon has the fault of not lasting ninety minutes, with his fatigue explaining why he let Brouzes' dribble past him without opposing it", simply "remaining in front of him as if paralyzed", which allowed Brouzes to score Red Star's third goal.

The previous year, on 12 June 1927, the 21-year-old Fidon earned his first (and only) international cap for France in a friendly match against Hungary at Budapest, coming off the bench to replace André Rollet in the 28th minute, when France was already 3–0; at half-time, Fidon was moved to center-half, but France still lost 13–1. He remained loyal to CA Paris until 1934, when he left for Amiens, where he retired in 1935, aged 29.

== Death ==
Fidon died in Saint-Germain-en-Laye on 16 August 1992, at the age of 86.

== Honours ==
CA Paris

- Coupe de France:
  - Runner-up: 1928
