= Georges Ouvray =

French footballer (1905–1983)

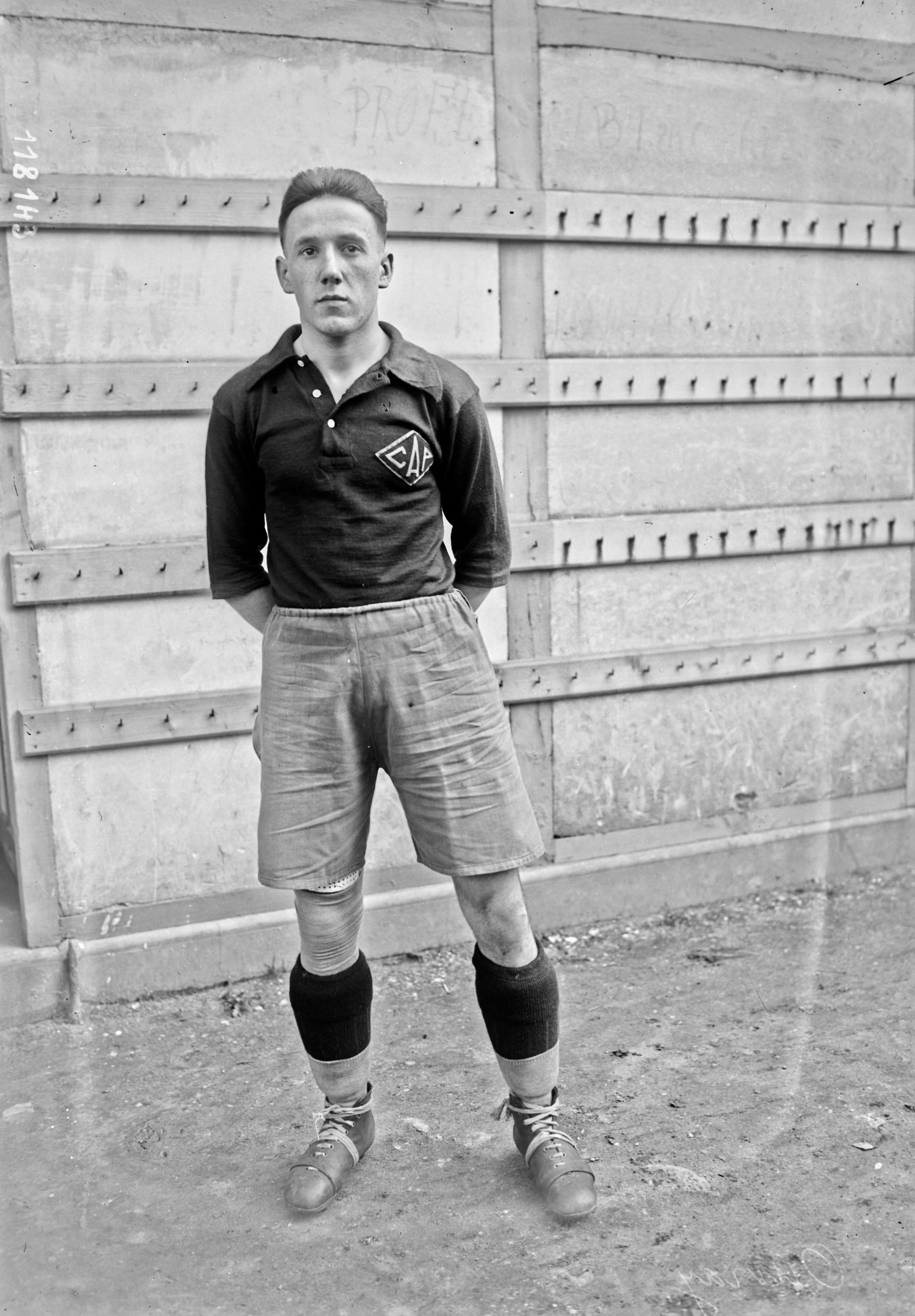
- Ouvray in 1927

Personal information
- Full name: Georges Maurice Ouvray
- Date of birth: 11 June 1905
- Place of birth: Saint-Maur-des-Fossés, France
- Date of death: 25 July 1983 (aged 78)
- Place of death: Fontenay-lès-Briis, France
- Position: Forward

Senior career*
Years	Team	Apps	(Gls)
1927–1933	CA Paris		
1933–1935	Club Français		

International career
1928	France	1	(1)
- * Club domestic league appearances and goals

Georges Maurice Ouvray (11 June 1905 – 25 July 1983) was a French footballer who played as a forward for CA Paris in the late 1920s.

== Career ==
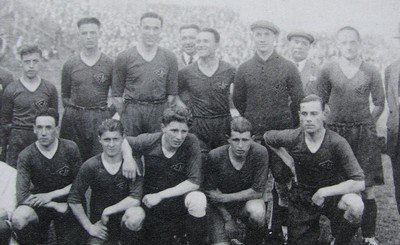
Ouvray (crouched, first from left) with the CA Paris team that played in the 1928 Coupe de France final.

Born in Saint-Maur-des-Fossés on 11 June 1905, Ouvray began his football career at CA Paris in 1927. Together with Jean Gautheroux, Marcel Langiller, and the Laurent brothers (Jean and Lucien), he was a member of the CA Paris team that reached the 1928 Coupe de France final at Colombes on 6 May, which ended in a 3–1 loss to Red Star. During the final, he overtook the opposing captain Marcel Domergue time and time again, and even hit the woodwork once; therefore, the following day, the journalists of the French newspaper Le Miroir des sports stated that he was "truly the great player of the final".

A few months earlier, on 21 February 1928, the 22-year-old Ouvray earned his first (and only) international cap for France in a friendly match against Northern Ireland at Montrouge, scoring his side's fourth goal to seal a 4–0 victory. He remained loyal to CA Paris until 1933, when he left for Club Français, where he retired in 1935, aged 30.

== Death ==
Ouvray died in Fontenay-lès-Briis on 25 July 1983, at the age of 78.

== Honours ==
CA Paris

- Coupe de France:
  - Runner-up: 1928
