= René Quentier =

French footballer (1903–1976)

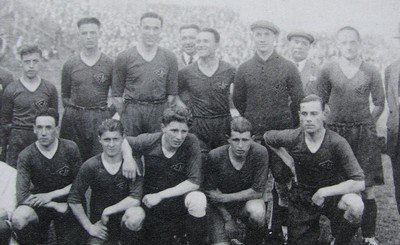
- Quentier (standing, third from right) in 1928

Personal information
- Full name: René Léon Quentier
- Date of birth: 20 June 1903
- Place of birth: Chambly, Oise, France
- Date of death: 18 November 1976 (aged 73)
- Place of death: 6th arrondissement of Paris, France
- Position: Midfielder

Senior career*
Years	Team	Apps	(Gls)
1922–1930	CA Paris		
- * Club domestic league appearances and goals

René Léon Quentier (20 June 1903 – 18 November 1976) was a French footballer who played as a midfielder for CA Paris in the late 1920s.

== Early life and education ==
René Quentier was born on 20 June 1903 in Chambly, Oise, as the son of the notary Simon Clodomir Quentier and Berthe Félicie Carillon. He studied at the Chambly municipal school, the Pontoise middle school, and Lycée Félix Faure in Beauvais, before graduating in law in Paris.

From January 1923 until July 1924, Quentier carried out his mandatory military service with the 3rd Fighter Aviation Regiment in Châteauroux.

== Playing career ==
Quentier began his football career at Beauvais (VCB), from which he joined CA Paris, where he served as the team's captain for 7 years in the 1920s. Together with Jean Gautheroux, Marcel Langiller, and the Laurent brothers (Jean and Lucien), Quentier was a member of the CA Paris team that reached the 1928 Coupe de France final, which ended in a 3–1 loss to Red Star.

Also in 1928, Quentier was selected three times for the French national team, but he never had the chance to come off the bench.

== Political career ==
Having taken over his father's office in Chambly, Quentier worked there for three decades, from 1930 until 1960. During the Second World War, Quentier was a member of the French Combatant Forces (FFC). He became engaged in the Free France movement in February 1941, where his main assignment was internal resistance, reaching a rank as high as P1. He was also a brilliant aviator, being awarded the Croix de Guerre, and the Legion of Honour.

In 1947, Quentier became a municipal councillor in Chambly, and in 1959, he became its mayor, a position that he held for 17 years, until he died in 6th arrondissement of Paris on 18 November 1976, at the age of 73.

== Honours ==
CA Paris

- Coupe de France:
  - Champions (1): 1928
