= Jean Gautheroux =

French footballer and manager (1909–1986)

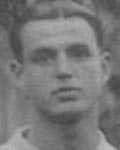
- Gautheroux

Personal information
- Full name: Jean Maurice Henri Gautheroux
- Date of birth: 11 February 1909
- Place of birth: Lalinde, France
- Date of death: 14 October 1986 (aged 77)
- Place of death: Maisons-Alfort, France
- Height: 1.77 m (5 ft 10 in)
- Position: Midfielder

Senior career*
Years	Team	Apps	(Gls)
1927–1929	CA Paris		
1929–1935	Racing Club de France		
1935–1938	Excelsior		
1938	RC Roubaix		
1939	CA Paris		
1939–1941	Red Star		

International career
1930–1936	France	2	(0)

Managerial career
- 1959–1960: France (13)
- * Club domestic league appearances and goals

Jean Maurice Henri Gautheroux (11 February 1909 – 14 October 1986) was a French footballer who played as a midfielder for CA Paris and the French national team in the late 1920s.

In 1959 and 1960, he co-directed 13 matches of the French national team.

== Playing career ==
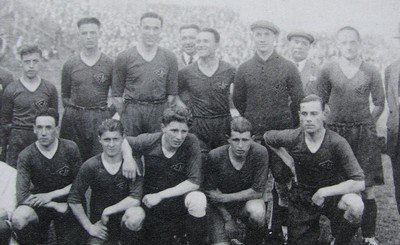
Fidon (Gautheroux, second from left) with the CA Paris team that played in the 1928 Coupe de France final.

Born in the Lalinde on 11 February 1909, Gautheroux began his football career at CA Paris in 1927, aged 18. Together with René Quentier, Marcel Langiller, and the Laurent brothers (Jean and Lucien), he was a member of the CA Paris team that reached the 1928 Coupe de France final at Colombes on 6 May, which ended in a 3–1 loss to Red Star. The following day, the journalists of the French newspaper Le Miroir des sports described him as having "only 19, but plays with the poise and foresight of a 30-year-old, served his forwards, both through openings to the wings and through passes to the center.

Two years later, on 23 February 1930, the 21-year-old Gautheroux, now a RC France player, earned his first (and only) international cap for France in a friendly match against Portugal at Porto, which ended in a 0–2 loss. He had to wait six years for his next appearance for France on 13 December 1936, now a RC Roubaix player, in another friendly, but this time against Yugoslavia, helping his side to a 1–0 victory. The following day, the journalists of the French newspaper L'Auto (currently known as L'Équipe stated that he "did not have the necessary authority at any time during the game", and added that he "never imposed himself; conscientious and diligent, he tried to do well but only had a very average match".

After leaving Roubaix in 1938, he briefly returned to CA Paris, before joining Red Star, where he retired in 1941, aged 32. In total, he played 88 matches in Ligue 1.

== Managerial career ==
From June 1959 until October 1960, Gautheroux was a member of the selection committee of the French football team, a triumvirate made up of himself, Georges Verriest, and Alexis Thépot, and which oversaw a total of 13 matches.

== Death ==
Gautheroux died in Maisons-Alfort on 14 October 1986, at the age of 77.

== Honours ==
CA Paris

- Coupe de France:
  - Runner-up: 1928
