= Alfred Compeyrat =

French footballer and sports leader

Alfred Compérat
Personal information
- Full name: Alfred Albert Compérat
- Date of birth: 28 January 1890
- Place of birth: Pantin, France
- Date of death: 27 September 1951 (aged 61)
- Place of death: Saint-Denis, France
- Position: Defender

Senior career*
Years	Team	Apps	(Gls)
1908–1910	Jeanne d'Arc de Levallois		
1910–1912	CA Rosaire		
1912–1914	Jeanne d'Arc de Levallois		

International career
1909–1911	France	3	(0)
- * Club domestic league appearances and goals

Alfred Albert Compérat, sometimes misspelled as Alfred Compeyrat (28 January 1890 – 27 September 1951), was a French footballer who played as a defender for Jeanne d'Arc de Levallois and the French national team between 1908 and 1910.

== Early life ==
Alfred Compérat was born in Pantin on 28 January 1890, (Note: Some sources wrongly state that he was born on 30 November 1889.) as the son of Jules Paul Alexandre Compérat (1859–1934), a mechanic, and Hélène Rossette (1859–1939), a perfumer. He was the fourth of five siblings, including two older brothers Lucien Nicolas (1883–1938) and Edmond Jules, who died shortly after his birth.

== Career ==
Compérat played his entire career in the patronage clubs, most notably at the Jeanne d'Arc de Levallois from 1908 to 1910, and CA Rosaire from 1910 to 1912, two of the many Catholic clubs affiliated with the Gymnastic and Sports Federation of French Patronages (FGSPF), with the latter club being located in the 14th arrondissement of Paris, near the Porte de Vanves station in Levallois.

On 9 May 1909, Compérat earned his first international cap in a friendly match against Belgium in Brussels; despite being a defender, he started on the wing due to a last-minute withdrawal, which partly resulted in a 2–5 loss. Two years later, in March and April 1911, he played his second and third match for France in friendlies against the England amateurs in Saint-Ouen, and again Belgium in Brussels, and this time he played at the back, his regular position, but France nonetheless lost both matches. His best performance came against England, since the French defense only conceded three goals, which was by far the lowest total in previous France-England matches (15–0, 12–0, 11–0 and 10–1), with the local press stating that he "was very satisfactory and made a single big mistake, which actually cost France a goal", referring to his collision with goalkeeper Henri Beau that allowed Dick Healey to score the opening goal. He remains the only player in CA Rosaire's history to have represented the French national team.

In addition to his 3 selections, Compérat was also an unused substitute on five occasions, in 1910 and 1911, being considered as a backup for either Simon Sollier or Jules Verlet. His career as a footballer ended within the JAL with the outbreak of the First World War, in which he fought as an artilleryman.

== Later life and death ==
On 21 October 1916, Compérat married Louise Henriette Roncin (1892–1971) in Val-de-Marne. Four years later, in 1920, his family settled in Saint-Denis, where Compérat died on 27 September 1951, at the age of 61.
