= Moulène =

Moulène is a French surname. Notable people with the surname include:

- Cameron Moulène (born 1993), French-American actor
- Georges Moulène (1901–1985), French footballer
- Jean-Luc Moulène (born 1955), French artist
