= Egil Brenna Lund =

Norwegian footballer (1903–1949)

Personal information
- Date of birth: 1 February 1903
- Place of birth: Fredrikstad, Norway
- Date of death: 26 October 1949 (aged 46)
- Position: Defender

Senior career*
Years	Team	Apps	(Gls)
?–1922	St. Croix IF		
1922–1927	Fredrikstad		
1927–1928	Red Star		
1928–1934	Fredrikstad		

International career
1926–1933	Norway	14	(0)
- * Club domestic league appearances and goals

Egil Brenna Lund (1 February 1903 – 26 October 1949) was a Norwegian footballer who played as a defender for Fredrikstad and the Norwegian national team in the 1920s and 1930s.

== Club career ==
=== Early career ===
Born in Fredrikstad on 1 February 1903, Egil Brenna Lund began his football career at St. Croix IF, where he played until 1922, when he was signed by another hometown club Fredrikstad FK, making his debut with the first team in a league match against Ørn on 15 October, aged 19. He quickly stood out as an uncompromising player whose defensive play often ended in fist fights with opponents, thus becoming very popular at home, but also immensely disliked away.

On 27 May 1925, Lund played a crucial role in helping Fredrikstad achieve its first win in Halden for 14 years, and in the following match they faced Sarpsborg, a team they had failed to defeat away in almost two decades, but he helped his side keep a clean-sheet until conceding a penalty shortly before the end in a 1–1 draw. In the following day, the magazine Idrætsliv highlighted Brenna Lund as the toughest player of the match, after which he escorted Sarpsborg's Alf Simensen, who was floundering, up to the stands, where he bowed to the Sarpsborg crowd and shouted: "Here you have your favorite!". He then helped FFK reach the quarterfinals of the 1925 Norwegian Football Cup for the first time, but were knocked-out by the eventual champions Brann 3–5.

=== Red Star ===
In 1927, several FFK players left the club, including Brenna Lund, who went to Paris, where he joined the ranks of Jules Rimet's Red Star, where he had an immediate impact, considering that in his first season there, the club won the 1928 Coupe de France final, in which he assisted and scored his side's opening two goals, both via a corner kick, in an eventual 3–1 victory over CA Paris.

=== Later career ===
Despite some encouraging first steps in France, Brenna Lund left Red Star at the end of the season, in July 1928, to return to his hometown club, which he helped reach the district final, which ended in a 1–2 loss to underdogs Selbak, partly because Brenna Lund was sent off, with the local press describing it as "an embarrassing incident", being even fined with 50 krones in addition to a "sharp reprimand". A few years later, he captained FFK to a triumph at the 1932 Norwegian Football Cup, beating the four-time champions Ørn 6–1 in the final, the largest final victory in 20 years. In the following year, FFK won the district championship with a 1–0 win over Moss in the replay. In the following year, in May 1933, he started for FFK in a 2–5 loss to the visiting Scottish professional team Aberdeen; FFK's 75th year book stated that "the duels between angry Scottish centre-backs and the smiling but tough Brenna Lund were something you never forget". A few weeks later, Brenna Lund was moved up to the center of the field for a match against Oslo's district champion Vålerengen, where he thrived quite well, scoring five goals to help his side to a 12–0 trashing.

In 1934, the 31-year-old Brenna Lund retired, becoming a starter in the veterans' team, as well as a secretary of FFK. FFK's difficult start to the 1934 season eventually caused both Brenna Lund and Morten Pettersen to briefly come out of retirement to help the team, with the former even scoring once against Torp on 5 June, which was described as "a delicacy of concentration".

== International career ==
On 10 October 1926, the 23-year-old Brenna Lund made his international debut for Norway in a friendly against Poland in Fredrikstad, which ended in a 3–4 loss. Having been impressed by the kits of the Polish team, Brenna Lund, a member of Fredrikstad's kit committee, asked for some kits from the Polish FA, who agreed, with their white and red being currently the club's colors.

Brenna Lund had to wait three years until his next appearance for Norway, on 12 June 1929, in a friendly against the Netherlands, where he once again conceded four goals in a 4–4 draw. In total, he earned 14 caps for Norway between 1926 and 1933, six in friendlies, and eight in the Nordic Football Championship, helping his side win the 1929–32 tournament, where he helped his side to a 5–2 victory against Denmark in Copenhagen on 23 June 1929, which was the first Norwegian victory on Danish soil.

== Death ==
Brenna Lund died on 26 October 1949, at the age of 46.

== Honours ==
=== Club ===
Red Star

- Coupe de France:
  - Champions (1): 1927–28

Fredrikstad

- Norwegian Football Cup
  - Champions (1): 1932

=== International ===
Norway

Nordic Football Championship

  - Champions (1): 1929–32
