= Georges-Henri =

Georges-Henri is a double-barrelled French given name. Notable people with the name include:

- Georges-Henri Albert (1882–1963), French footballer
- Georges-Henri Bousquet (1900–1978), French jurist, economist, and Islamologist
- Georges-Henri Colombe (born 1998), French rugby union player
- Georges-Henri Halphen (1844–1889), French mathematician
- Georges-Henri Lévesque (1903–2000), Canadian Dominican priest and sociologist
- Georges-Henri Pingusson (1894–1978), French architect
- Georges-Henri Rivière (1897–1985), French museologist and innovator of modern French ethnographic museology practices
