= Henri Beau (footballer) =

French footballer (1881–1928)

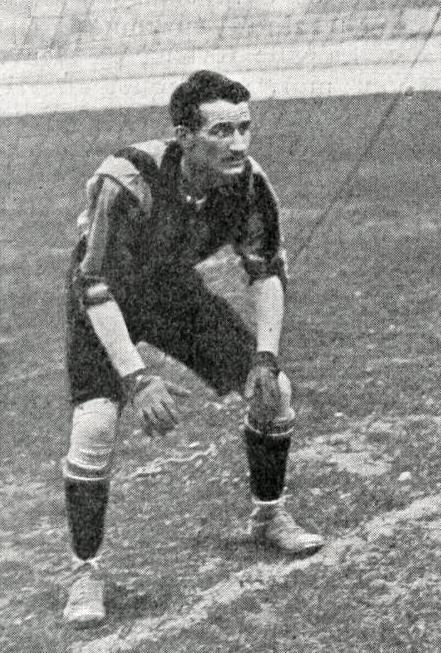
- Beau in 1904

Personal information
- Full name: Ernest Henri Beau
- Date of birth: 28 November 1881
- Place of birth: 14th arrondissement of Paris, France
- Date of death: 27 June 1928 (aged 46)
- Place of death: 14th arrondissement of Paris, France
- Position: Goalkeeper

Youth career
- 1897–1902: Nationale de Saint-Mandé

Senior career*
Years	Team	Apps	(Gls)
1899–1903	Nationale de Saint-Mandé		
1903–1905	FC Paris		
1905–1912	CA Paris		

International career
1902	Paris XI	1	(0)
1903–1904	France (unofficial)	2	(0)
1911	France	5	(0)
- * Club domestic league appearances and goals

Ernest Henri Beau, also known as Henri Coulon (28 November 1881 – 27 June 1928), was a French footballer who played as a goalkeeper for CA Paris and the French national team between 1902 and 1911. At club level, he won a three-peat of Coupe Manier titles (1905–07), and was a three-time French champion in water polo (1905–06 and 1908), and even secretary of CA Paris.

== Early life ==
Henri Beau was born in 14th arrondissement of Paris on 28 November 1881, as the son of Joseph-Henri, a storekeeper, and a cook, who married in July 1881; since the child was born in November, the bride was already 5 months pregnant.

== Club career ==
=== Nationale de Saint-Mandé ===
In 1897, the 16-year-old Beau took out a license with the Nationale de Saint-Mandé, which later became FC Paris and then CA Paris. In October 1899, just a month shy of his 18th birthday, he started for Saint-Mandé in a USFSA Paris Championship match against US Puteaux.

After several years playing in the club's youth ranks and its second team, Beau finally became a regular in the senior team in 1902, aged 21, quickly establishing himself as an undisputed starter. On 2 March 1902, he started in the semifinals of the 1902 Coupe Dewar, which ended in a 3–1 loss to Standard AC. On 8 November 1903, Beau started in the final of the 1903–04 Coupe Manier in Vincennes, in which he made a "masterful" save from Georges Bayrou in an eventual 3–2 loss in extra-time to Gallia Club.

Beau was a member of the Paris Football Commission at the USFSA in 1904, and he also held the position of secretary of CA Paris. He also practiced water polo at the CAP, with which he was a three-time French champion (1905, 1906, and 1908) and even an international.

=== CA Paris ===
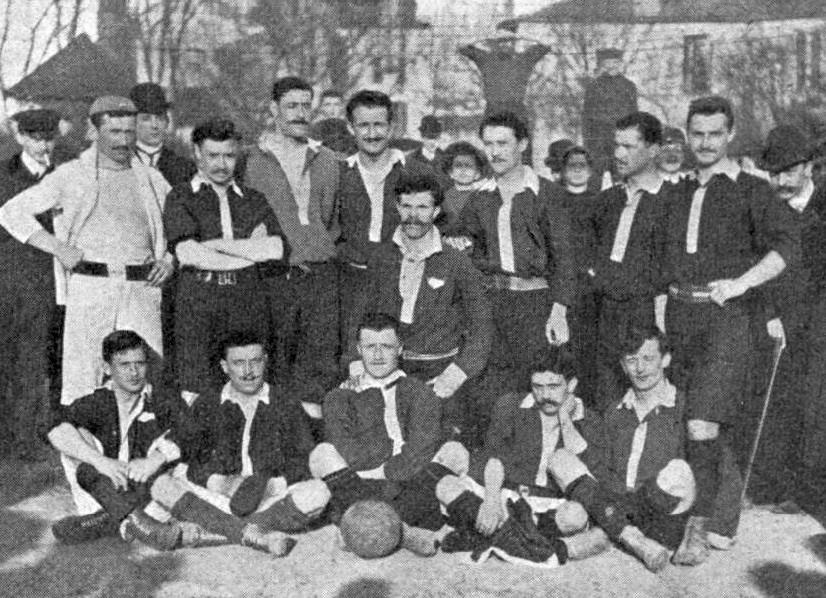
Beau with the CA Paris team that won the Coupe Manier in 1905.

Together with Jules Verlet, Charles Bilot, Gaston Cyprès, and Louis Mesnier, Beau played a crucial role in the FC Paris team that won a three-peat of Coupe Manier titles from 1905 to 1907, beating Gallia Club 5–2 in the 1905 final, while the 1906 and 1907 titles were awarded to the team composed of at least eight French players with the highest ranking in the USFSA Paris championship, and in fact, FC Paris won that championship in 1906, and were runner-ups in 1907 behind RC de France, who did not meet the criteria for obtaining the trophy, so CA Paris therefore kept it. As the champions of Paris in 1906, FC Paris qualified for the USFSA national championship, and on 29 April, Beau started in the final against RC Roubaix, in which he saved a penalty and "defended fiercely", but also conceded four goals in a 4–1 loss. During this period, Beau had the likes of Verlet and Bilot in front of him, playing as full-backs, and together, they formed a great defensive partnership.

In 1909, CA Paris won its second USFSA Paris Championship, and thus qualified for the USFSA National Championship, but they once again fell short in the final, which ended in a 3–2 loss to SH de Marseille, a team made up of Swiss immigrants; the goals "they scored were very good shots, leaving Beau with little hope of saving them". In the following year, on 8 May, Beau started in the final of the 1910 Coupe Dewar, in which he "made no mistakes" to help his side to a 3–1 win over Gallia Club. The journalists of the French newspaper L'Auto (the forerunner of L'Équipe) noted that Beau was very "regular" throughout the whole 1910 season.

=== Adopting a pseudonym ===
On 27 August 1910, CAP left the USFSA and founded the Ligue de Football Association (LFA), and Beau himself was one of the founding members, alongside CAP's president Michel Fontaine, and Red Star's president Jules Rimet. During the summer of 1910, Beau's name disappeared from the reports, to make way for Coulon's, his pseudonym, which he only adopted after 13 years of career and with a well-established reputation. During his lifetime, the newspapers respected his desire for anonymity, since it was only after his death, in June 1928, that they revealed that "Henri Beau was under the name of Coulon". The reasons for this sudden change remain unclear, but it was most likely related to the change of federations, since the LFA was a single-sport organization, dealing only with football, and not water polo, which meant that the CAP water polo section remained affiliated with the USFSA, of which Beau was the team captain, and even an international for the French national team. It was hard to be affiliated with two opposing federations, in two different sports, but his pseudonym would allow Beau to remain affiliated with the USFSA to play water polo, while Coulon played football at the LFA.

On 12 March 1911, Coulon started in the final of the 1910–11 LFA Championship at the Charentonneau, keeping a clean-sheet in a 1–0 win over Red Star. This victory allowed the club to compete in the 1911 Trophée de France, an inter-federation national competition organized by the CFI; Coulon started in the final on 11 June against Étoile des Deux Lacs, winners of the FGSPF, in which he kept another clean-sheet in another 1–0 victory, thus winning a trophy that had been donated by Pierre de Coubertin himself. The journalists of L'Auto stated that the winner's best players were "Coulon, C. Bilot, Bigué, Cyprès, and Gravier".

Two years later, on 30 March 1913, Coulon started in a Challenge International de Paris match against Red Star at the Charentonneau, which ended in a 3–1 loss.

== International career ==
In March 1902, Beau played for a Paris XI that went to London to challenge Marlow FC, which ended in a 4–0 loss. In 1903 and 1904, the USFSA selected him to play two unofficial matches between France and English club Corinthian, in which he conceded a total of 22 goals (0–11 and 4–11, respectively). The French press of the time stated that "Beau, whose composure is nevertheless well known, was absolutely helpless at not even being able to try to save his goals. A few whistles were heard in his direction, very unfairly, because there is nothing to be done against shots from three meters away".

Beau earned all of his five caps for France in a space of five months in 1911, at almost 30 years old, and under his new pseudonym of Coulon. His best performance came in his second appearance against England amateurs on 23 March, since he only conceded three goals, which was by far the lowest total in previous France-England matches (15–0, 12–0, 11–0 and 10–1); not to mention that the first English goal was only scored following a collision between Beau and his defender Alfred Compeyrat. With France, he lost all of his five matches while conceding 20 goals, doing so with a worrying progression: 3, then 5, and finally 7, in a friendly against Belgium in Brussels. In fact, Coulon was acting as France's "interim goalkeeper", replacing Louis Tessier, who had to leave for military service in October 1910, and being replaced by Pierre Chayriguès, who would be the first world-class French goalkeeper.

Beau played his entire official international career as Coulon, but one does not have the right to take just any pseudonym because the law stipulates that a pseudonym must not be a pretext for appropriating the fame of a third party; however, there was a famous Henri Coulon at the time, a lawyer and a well-known painter, and on 23 March, while the footballer played a match widely reported by the newspapers against England, the lawyer-painter exhibited 75 paintings in a Parisian gallery. The "real" Henri Coulon could have rightly considered himself wronged by an identity theft that created confusion, since even the first name was identical, and was thus entitled to claim damages from the courts had he wanted to. The reasons why he chose the name Coulon remain unclear, but there was a certain Coulon playing for Standard AC at the turn of the century, who Beau might have watched and even faced on the pitch.

== Playing style ==
Beau's playing style was quite particular for the time, close to that of a handball goalkeeper: He used his hands little, except to deflect the ball, never dived, and focused his game on positioning. He was, therefore, more effective on long-range shots, because he can block the shooting angle, in comparison to close-range shots, where he only relies on his feet, which he throws in opposition. Because of this, the French press sometimes pointed out that "he would be the ideal goalkeeper if he got rid of his old fault of not wanting to use his hands".

== Later life ==
Even after his retirement, Beau remained a reference in his position, becoming a writer who published articles about goalkeepers, including a special issue in the magazine La Vie au Grand Air in 1914, where he was tasked with studying the role of the goalkeeper, and another one from 1913, in which profiled the "perfect goalkeeper", concluding that Pierre Chayrigues was the best French goalkeeper of the era, describing him as "the most wonderful player we have had in France".

Outside football, Beau worked for a fabric merchant since at least 1902. After the First World War, Beau became a cloth merchant at Avenue de l'Opéra.

== Death ==
Beau died in 14th arrondissement of Paris on 27 June 1928, at the age of 46, from a long illness most likely caused by exposure to gas at the Battle of Verdun during the War.

== Honours ==
CA Paris

- USFSA Paris Championship: 1905–06, 1908–09
- USFSA Football Championship runner-up: 1906, 1909
- Trophée de France: 1911
- Coupe Manier: 1905, 1906, 1907; runner-up 1904
- Coupe Dewar: 1910
- Challenge international du Nord runner-up: 1910
