= Eugène Proust =

French footballer and manager (1921–1989)

Eugène "Michey" Proust (8 January 1921 – November 1989) was a French football player and manager who was born in Paizay-le-Tort, Deux-Sèvres.

== Career ==
A midfielder or attacker, Proust began his playing career at Cercle Athlétique de Paris, later AS Pathé Cinéma Paris before moving to Red Star in 1946, to RC Strasbourg in 1948, and to Amiens SC in 1949. He retired from football after one last season at Red Star in 1952–53, as player-manager.

He took over as manager of Stade Malherbe Caen from 1953 to 1955, and at Cercle Athlétique de Paris from 1959 to 1961 and at JGA Nevers from 1961 to 1975.
