= André Rollet =

French footballer (1905–1985)

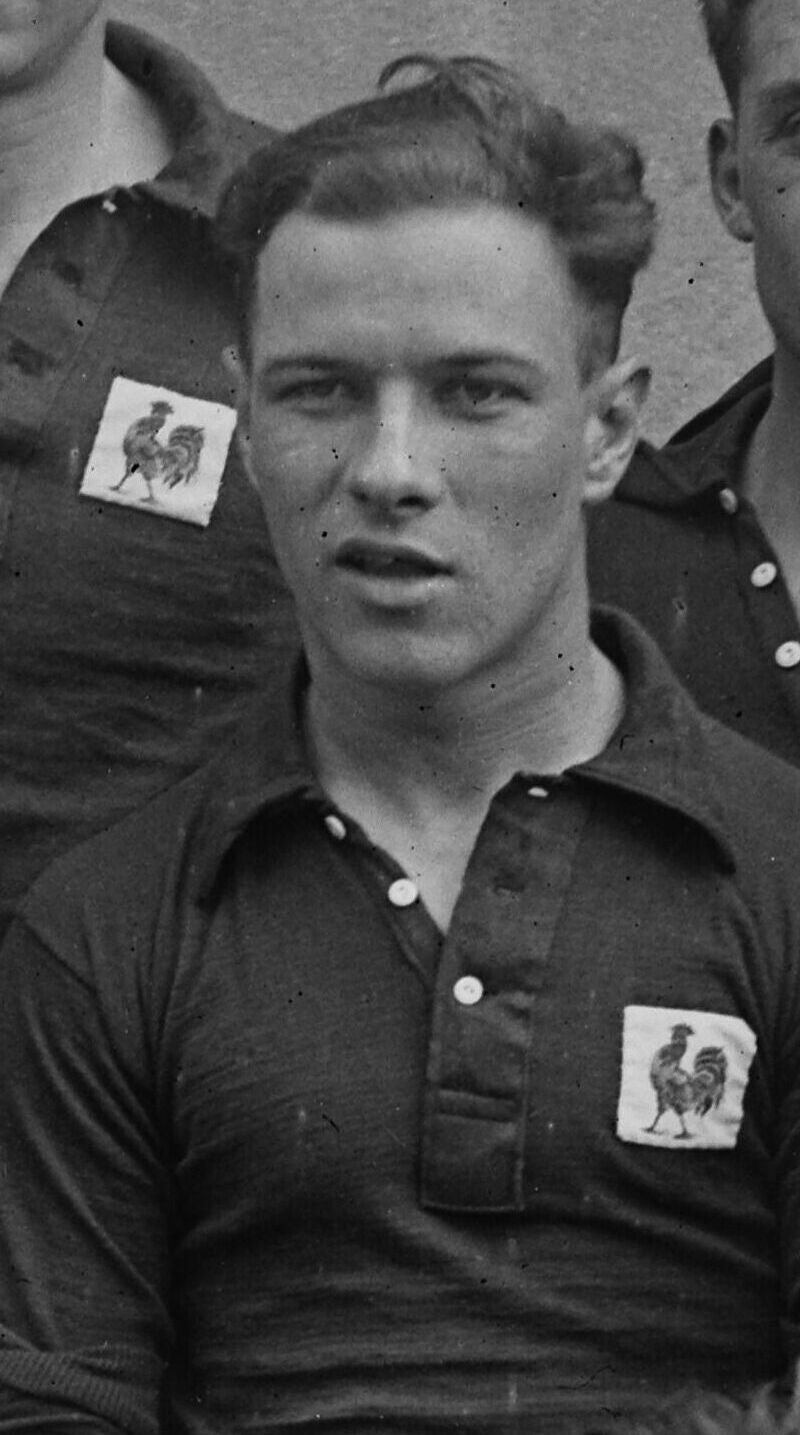
- Rollet in 1927

Personal information
- Full name: André Gustave Rollet
- Date of birth: 8 October 1905
- Place of birth: Ivry-sur-Seine, France
- Date of death: 20 April 1985 (aged 79)
- Place of death: 12th arrondissement of Paris, France
- Position: Defender

Senior career*
Years	Team	Apps	(Gls)
1921–1930	FEC Levallois		

International career
1927	France	4	(0)
- * Club domestic league appearances and goals

André Gustave Rollet (8 October 1905 – 20 April 1985) was a French footballer who played as a defender for FEC Levallois and the French national team in the 1920s.

== Career ==
Born in the Val-de-Marne town of Ivry-sur-Seine on 8 October 1905, Rollet spent his entire 9-year career at FEC Levallois, from 1921 until 1930, eventually establishing himself as the team's captain. On 24 April 1927, the 21-year-old Rollet made his international debut for France in a friendly against Italy at Colombes, which ended in a 3–3 draw. The following day, the journalists of the French newspaper L'Auto (currently known as L'Équipe) stated that he "defended skillfully".

Rollet played a further three matches for France in May and June 1927, with his last appearance ending in a resounding 13–1 loss to Hungary, in which he was replaced by Jean Fidon in the 28th minute. In total, he earned four international caps for France, all in 1927, which ended in three defeats and one draw. The following year, he was a member of the French squad that competed in the football tournament of the 1928 Olympic Games in Amsterdam, being selected as a late replacement for Jacques Wild, who, unlike Rollet, is listed in the official report.

== Death ==
Rollet died in 12th arrondissement of Paris on 20 April 1985, at the age of 79.
