= Miconge =

- Commune
- Location in Angola
- Coordinates: 4°27′S 12°53′E
- Country: Angola
- Province: Cabinda Province
- Time zone: UTC+1 (WAT)
- Climate: Aw

Miconge is a commune of Angola, located in the enclave-province of Cabinda.

Eduardo Camavinga, a French footballer, was born in the town.

== See also ==
- Communes of Angola
