= Eduardo Camavinga =

Footballer (born 2002)

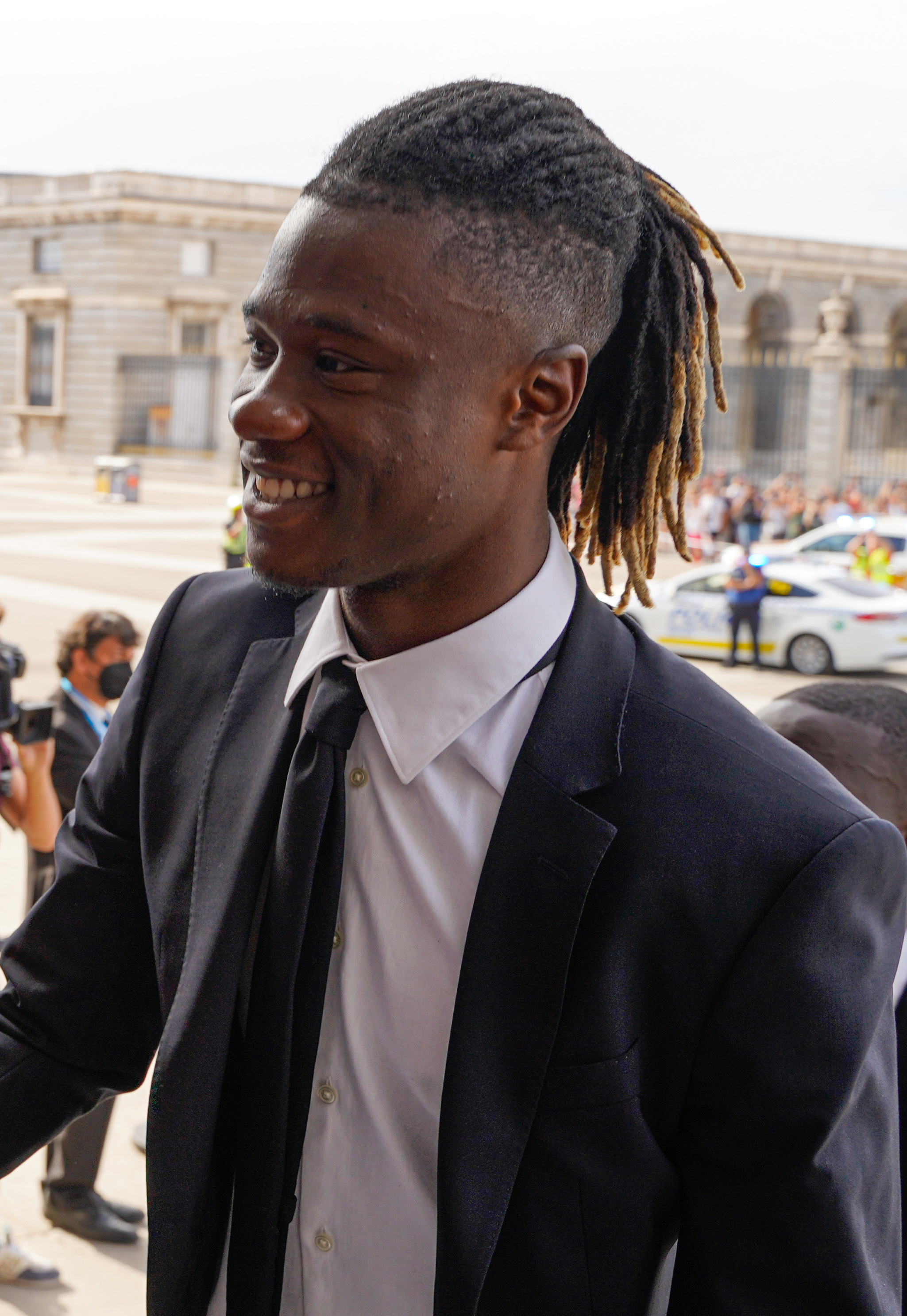
- Camavinga in 2022

Personal information
- Full name: Eduardo Celmi Camavinga
- Date of birth: 10 November 2002 (age 24)
- Place of birth: Cabinda, Angola
- Height: 1.85 m (6 ft 1 in)
- Positions: Midfielder; left-back

Team information
- Current team: Real Madrid
- Number: 6

Youth career
- 2009–2013: Drapeau-Fougères
- 2013–2018: Rennes

Senior career*
Years	Team	Apps	(Gls)
2018–2019	Rennes II	13	(4)
2019–2021	Rennes	71	(2)
2021–	Real Madrid	154	(4)

International career^{‡}
2019–2022	France U21	13	(2)
2020–	France	35	(2)
Medal record
Men's football
Representing France
FIFA World Cup
Runner-up	2022 Qatar
- * Club domestic league appearances and goals as of 22:06, 21 November 2026 (UTC) ‡ National team caps and goals as of 22:30, 15 November 2026 (UTC)

Eduardo Celmi Camavinga (born 10 November 2002) is a professional footballer who plays as a central midfielder and occasionally as a left-back for La Liga club Real Madrid. Born in Angola, he plays for the France national team.

Camavinga began his career in Ligue 1 with Rennes, making his senior debut at the age of 16, and quickly established himself as a regular first-team player. In 2021, he signed for Real Madrid for a fee of €31 million, and over the following seasons, he helped the club win two La Liga–Champions League doubles in 2022 and 2024.

Born in Angola, to Congolese refugees, Camavinga moved to France at a young age, eventually representing the country at the under-21 level. He made his first senior appearance for the France national team in 2020 at the age of 17, becoming the nation's youngest debutant in over a century. He was part of the French squad that finished runners-up at the 2022 FIFA World Cup.

== Early life ==
Camavinga was born in a refugee camp in Cabinda, Angola in 2002. His parents, Celestino Camavinga and Sofia Simão, had fled the civil war in Congo before his birth in a refugee camp in Miconge. He has five siblings. His family moved to France when he was two. They eventually settled in Fougères, where he grew up. He did judo for a time before giving it up to focus solely on football. In 2013, the Camavingas' house was burnt down, destroying most of the family's property. Camavinga stated that this was a source of motivation that pushed him to pursue a career in football and help his family.

On 7 July 2020, he obtained the Baccalauréat ES (Economic and Social) without mention.

== Club career ==
=== Rennes ===
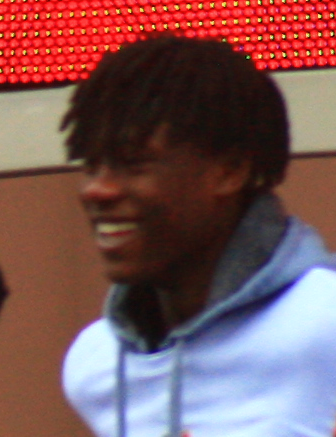
Camavinga in 2019

Camavinga joined Rennes' youth system when he was eleven. He signed his first professional contract on 14 December 2018, at the age of 16 years and one month, becoming the youngest ever professional for the club at that time. He made his professional debut for Rennes in a 3–3 Ligue 1 tie with Angers on 6 April 2019, becoming the youngest player to ever play for Rennes' first team, at 16 years and six months old.

On 18 August 2019, Camavinga recorded an assist and was awarded the man of the match award in a 2–1 win against Paris Saint-Germain. Hence, he became the youngest player to make an assist in Ligue 1, aged 16 years and 281 days. He then won the UNFP Player of the Month award that month, to be the youngest player to achieve this feat. He scored his first goal for Rennes in a 1–0 win against Lyon on 15 December 2019, in the 89th minute of the game.

In the 2020–21 UEFA Champions League, he featured in four matches for Rennes against Krasnodar, Chelsea and Sevilla.

=== Real Madrid ===
On 31 August 2021, Real Madrid announced the signing of Camavinga until 30 June 2027. He made his debut in a 5–2 win over Celta Vigo on 12 September, in which he scored a goal shortly after coming off the bench. Three days later, he made his Champions League debut for Real Madrid, coming on as a substitute for Luka Modrić in the 80th minute and assisting Rodrygo for the winner against Inter Milan.

Camavinga made a substitute appearance in the 85th minute of the 2022 UEFA Champions League final on 28 May, helping Real Madrid win 1–0 over Liverpool to earn the 2021–22 UEFA Champions League title with his team. On 9 May 2023, he provided an assist to Vinícius Júnior to take the lead in a 1–1 draw against Manchester City in the Champions League semi-final first leg at the Santiago Bernabéu, to be the youngest in the competition's semi-finals to do so, aged 20 years and 180 days.

On 7 November 2023, Real Madrid announced the extension of Camavinga's contract, which is to remain effective until 30 June 2029.

He missed the first official match of the 2024–25 season, the 2024 UEFA Super Cup, after injuring his left knee in training on the eve of the match and was expected to be out for several weeks with an internal sprain to the knee. On 2 October 2024, Camavinga returned to action against Lille in the 2024–25 UEFA Champions League.

Camavinga endured a difficult season, marked by a decline in performance and reduced playing time. Less influential in Real Madrid's midfield, he was gradually relegated to a secondary role by Carlo Ancelotti. Occasionally lining up at left-back due to absences in that area, he was unable to rediscover his best form. His season came to a premature end on 23 April 2025, when he suffered a total rupture of his left adductor tendon during a match against Getafe. The injury would rule him out for several months, forcing him to miss the Copa del Rey final, the UEFA Nations League Finals, and the FIFA Club World Cup.

On 30 September 2025, he scored his first UEFA Champions League goal in a 5–0 away win over Kairat.

== International career ==
On 31 October 2019, Camavinga obtained French nationality, benefiting from the collective effect connected to the naturalization of his father. Until then, Camavinga had been a national of the Republic of the Congo. Six days later, he was selected to represent France's under-21 team for games against Georgia and Switzerland, after Matteo Guendouzi was called up to the senior team.

On 27 August 2020, Camavinga was called up to play on France's senior team after Paul Pogba was sidelined by a positive COVID-19 test. He became, in the process, the youngest player to be called up to the French senior team since René Gérard in 1932, who was only 17 years, nine months and 17 days old. On 8 September, he debuted in a 4–2 win against Croatia in the UEFA Nations League, replacing N'Golo Kanté midway through the second half. In doing so he became the youngest player to play for the France national team, following Maurice Gastiger in 1914 at 17 years, nine months, and 29 days old.

On 7 October 2020, Camavinga made his first start for France in a 7–1 win against Ukraine where he scored his first international goal, opening the scoring with an overhead kick. This made him the youngest goalscorer for France since Maurice Gastiger in 1914.

On 25 June 2021, Camavinga was named in Sylvain Ripoll's 18-man France squad for the Summer Olympics in 2021. However, he was later removed from the squad after his club, Rennes, objected.

Camavinga played twice at the 2022 FIFA World Cup, in which reigning champions France finished as runners-up in Qatar. He played as a left-back in the final group game, a 1–0 loss to Tunisia in which manager Didier Deschamps rested his regular players ahead of the knockout stage. In the final, he came on after 71 minutes in place of Théo Hernandez as the French were losing 2–0 to Argentina; the game ended 2–2 after 90 minutes and 3–3 after extra time, as France lost on penalties.

== Career statistics ==
=== Club ===
As of match played 21 November 2026

Appearances and goals by club, season and competition
Club	Season	League			National cup (Note: Includes Coupe de France, Copa del Rey)		League cup (Note: Includes Coupe de la Ligue)		Europe		Other		Total	
Club	Season	Division	Apps	Goals	Apps	Goals	Apps	Goals	Apps	Goals	Apps	Goals	Apps	Goals
Rennes II	2018–19	National 3	13	4	—		—		—		—		13	4
Rennes	2018–19	Ligue 1	7	0	0	0	0	0	0	0	—		7	0
Rennes	2019–20	Ligue 1	25	1	5	0	1	0	4 (Note: Appearances in UEFA Europa League)	0	1 (Note: Appearance in Trophée des Champions)	0	36	1
Rennes	2020–21	Ligue 1	35	1	0	0	—		4 (Note: Appearances in UEFA Champions League)	0	—		39	1
Rennes	2021–22	Ligue 1	4	0	0	0	—		2 (Note: Appearances in UEFA Europa Conference League)	0	—		6	0
Rennes	Total		71	2	5	0	1	0	10	0	1	0	88	2
Real Madrid	2021–22	La Liga	26	2	3	0	—		10	0	1 (Note: Appearance(s) in Supercopa de España)	0	40	2
Real Madrid	2022–23	La Liga	37	0	6	0	—		11	0	5 (Note: Two appearances in Supercopa de España, one appearance in UEFA Super Cup, two appearances in FIFA Club World Cup)	0	59	0
Real Madrid	2023–24	La Liga	31	0	2	0	—		11	0	2	0	46	0
Real Madrid	2024–25	La Liga	19	1	4	1	—		9	0	3 (Note: Two appearances in Supercopa de España, one appearance in FIFA Intercontinental Cup)	0	35	2
Real Madrid	2025–26	La Liga	29	1	1	0	—		11	1	2	0	43	2
Real Madrid	2026–27	La Liga	12	0	0	0	—		2	0	0	0	14	0
Real Madrid	Total		154	4	16	1	—		54	1	13	0	237	6
Career total			238	10	21	1	1	0	64	1	14	0	338	12

=== International ===
As of match played 15 November 2026

Appearances and goals by national team and year
National team	Year	Apps	Goals
France	2020	3	1
France	2022	3	0
France	2023	7	0
France	2024	11	1
France	2025	4	0
France	2026	7	0
Total		35	2

As of match played 23 March 2025
Scores and results list France's goal tally first, score column indicates score after each Camavinga goal.

List of international goals scored by Eduardo Camavinga
No.	Date	Venue	Cap	Opponent	Score	Result	Competition	Ref.
1	7 October 2020	Stade de France, Saint-Denis, France	2	Ukraine	1–0	7–1	Friendly	
2	10 October 2024	Bozsik Aréna, Budapest, Hungary	22	Israel	1–0	4–1	2024–25 UEFA Nations League A	

== Honours ==
Real Madrid

- La Liga: 2021–22, 2023–24
- Copa del Rey: 2022–23
- Supercopa de España: 2022, 2024
- UEFA Champions League: 2021–22, 2023–24
- UEFA Super Cup: 2022, 2024
- FIFA Club World Cup: 2022
- FIFA Intercontinental Cup: 2024

France

- FIFA World Cup runner-up: 2022

Individual

- UNFP Ligue 1 Player of the Month: August 2019
- Kopa Trophy runner-up: 2022
- IFFHS Men's Youth (U20) World Team: 2020, 2021, 2022
