= René Gérard (footballer) =

French footballer (1914-1987)

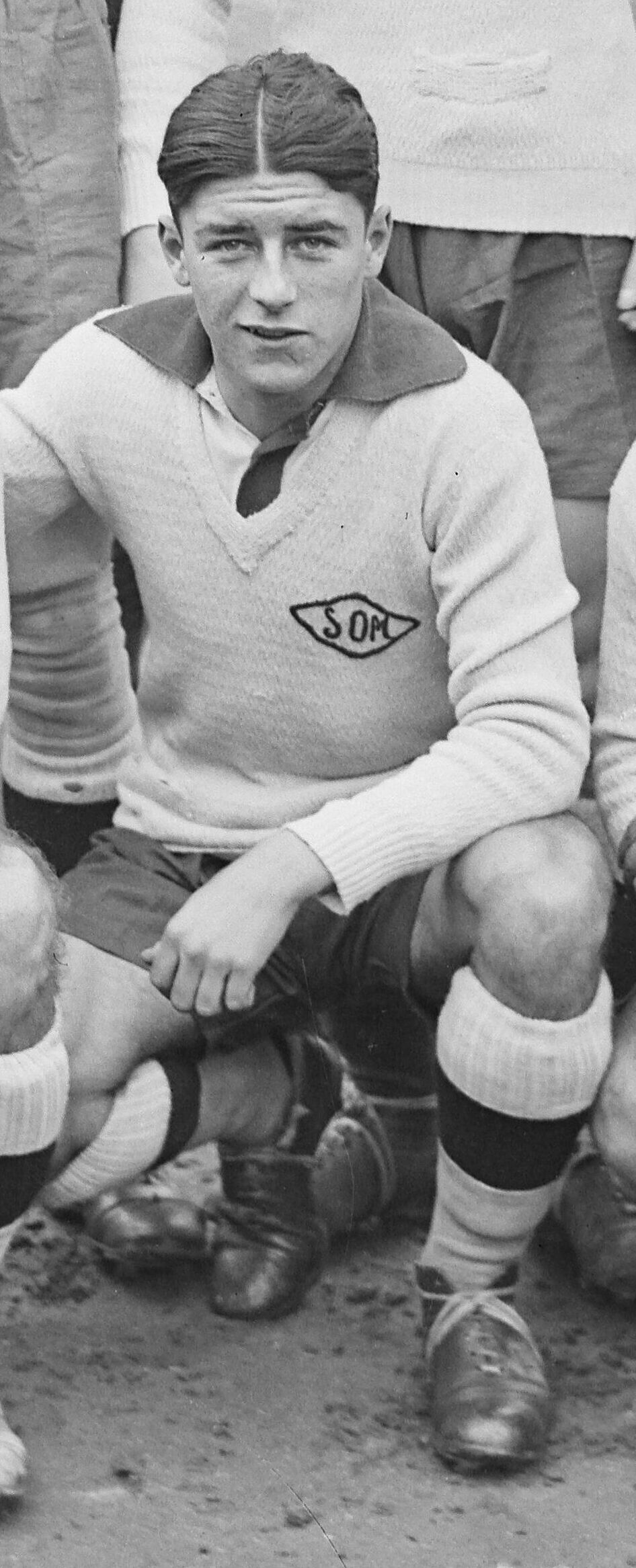

Personal information
- Date of birth: 8 June 1914
- Place of birth: Montpellier, France
- Date of death: 7 July 1987 (aged 73)
- Place of death: Montpellier, France
- Position: Midfielder

Youth career
- Montpellier

Senior career*
| Years | Team | Apps | (Gls) |
| 1930–1934 | Montpellier | | |
| 1935–1936 | FC Sète | 28 | (8) |
| 1936–1938 | Red Star | | |
| 1938–1939 | CA Paris | | |

International career
| 1932–1933 | France | 7 | (2) |
- * Club domestic league appearances and goals

René Gérard (8 June 1914 – 7 July 1987) was a French footballer who played as a midfielder for Montpellier, FC Sète, Red Star, CA Paris and France.

== Club career ==
Gérard began his career with hometown club Montpellier, remaining with the club during French football's transition to professionalism in 1932. Gérard stayed at Montpellier until 1934, signing for FC Sète in 1935. Gérard stayed with the club for one season, scoring eight goals in 26 league games. The following season, Gérard signed for Red Star, staying with the club for two seasons. In 1938, Gérard signed for CA Paris. Gérard stayed with the club until the suspension of French football in the 1939–40 season, due to the outbreak of World War II.

== International career ==
In 1932, Gérard became the third-youngest player to be called up by France at the age of 17 and 11 months. In 2020, Rennes midfielder Eduardo Camavinga replaced him as the third-youngest player in the history of the France national team. On 8 May 1932, Gérard made his debut for France in a 3–1 defeat against Scotland. On 19 March 1933, Gérard scored twice against Germany in a 3–3 draw in Berlin.

=== International goals ===
Scores and results list France's goal tally first.

International goals by date, venue, opponent, score, result and competition
| No. | Date | Venue | Cap | Opponent | Score | Result | Competition |
|---|---|---|---|---|---|---|---|
| 1 | 19 March 1933 | Deutsches Stadion, Berlin, Germany | 3 | Germany | 2–3 | 3–3 | Friendly |
| 2 | 19 March 1933 | Deutsches Stadion, Berlin, Germany | 3 | Germany | 3–3 | 3–3 | Friendly |
