= Roger Rio =

French footballer (1913–1999)

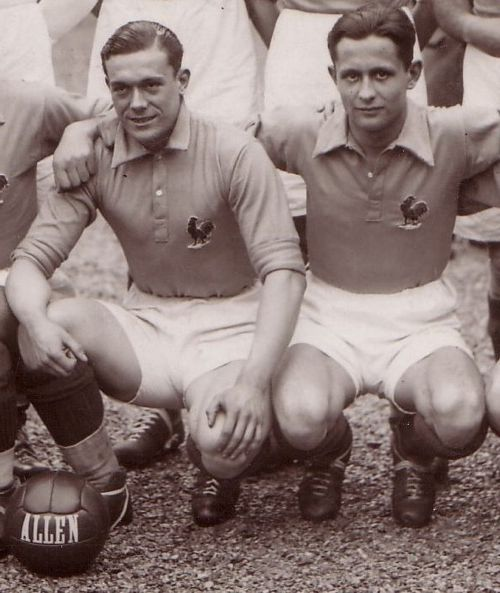
- Rio (right) and Jean Nicolas for the France national team (1934)

Personal information
- Full name: Roger Joseph Rio
- Date of birth: 13 February 1913
- Place of birth: Dunkirk, France
- Date of death: 23 April 1999 (aged 86)
- Height: 1.74 m (5 ft 9 in)
- Position: Midfielder

Senior career*
Years	Team	Apps	(Gls)
1932–1943	Rouen		
1943–1944	Équipe fédérale Rouen-Normandie		
1944–1952	Rouen		

International career
1933–1937	France	18	(4)
- * Club domestic league appearances and goals

Roger Joseph Rio (13 February 1913 – 23 April 1999) was a French footballer who played as a midfielder for Rouen. For the France national team he earned 18 caps and scored 4 goals and played in the 1934 FIFA World Cup. He was the father of Patrice Rio, who represented France at the 1978 FIFA World Cup.
