= Jean Nicolas =

French footballer (1913–1978)

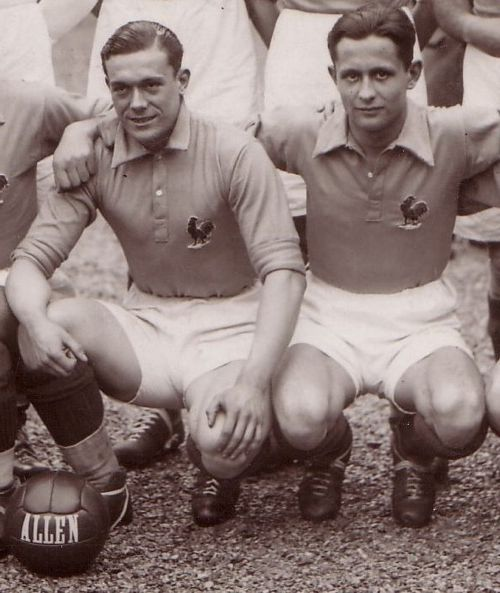
- Nicolas (left) and Roger Rio for France national football team (1934)

Personal information
- Full name: Jean Édouard Marie Nicolas
- Date of birth: 9 June 1913
- Place of birth: Nanterre, France
- Date of death: 8 September 1978 (aged 65)
- Place of death: Paris, France
- Height: 1.76 m (5 ft 9 in)
- Position: Striker

Youth career
- Rouen

Senior career*
Years	Team	Apps	(Gls)
1929–1939	Rouen	164	(193)

International career
1933–1938	France	25	(21)
- * Club domestic league appearances and goals

Jean Édouard Marie Nicolas (9 June 1913 – 8 September 1978) was a French footballer who played as a striker. Born in Nanterre, Nicolas played club football for Rouen. He appeared in the 1934 and 1938 World Cup squads for France, and scored two goals in the 1938 edition of the tournament.

He scored a total of 21 goals in 25 international games between 1933 and 1938, making him the fourteenth-highest goalscorer for France.

== Career statistics ==
=== Club ===
Appearances and goals by club, season, and competition. Only official games are included in this table.
Club	Season	League			Coupe de France		Other		Total	
Club	Season	Division	Apps	Goals	Apps	Goals	Apps	Goals	Apps	Goals
Rouen	1929–30	DH Normandy Championship	0	3	0	0	0	0	0+	3
Rouen	1930–31	DH Normandy Championship	14	26	5	11	1	7	20	43
Rouen	1931–32	DH Normandy Championship	0	27	3+	5	2+	5	5+	37
Rouen	1932–33	DH Normandy Championship	13	29	3	11	1	9	17	49
Rouen	1933–34	Ligue 2	26	54	4	3	0	0	30	57
Rouen	1934–35	Ligue 2	23	30	4	9	–		27	39
Rouen	1935–36	Ligue 2	34	45	2	5	–		36	50
Rouen	1936–37	Ligue 1	30	27	5	8	0	0	37	42
Rouen	1937–38	Ligue 1	29	26	2	0	0	0	31	26
Rouen	1938–39	Ligue 1	23	11	2	6	0	0	25	17
Rouen	1939–40	North Zone	1	0	0	0	0	0	1	0
Rouen	Total		191+	278	23	57	4+	21	218+	356

=== International ===
Appearances and goals by national team and year
National team	Year	Apps	Goals
France	1933	6	3
France	1934	7	12
France	1935	2	0
France	1937	4	1
France	1938	6	5
Total		25	21
