= Jacques Wild =

French footballer (1905–1990)

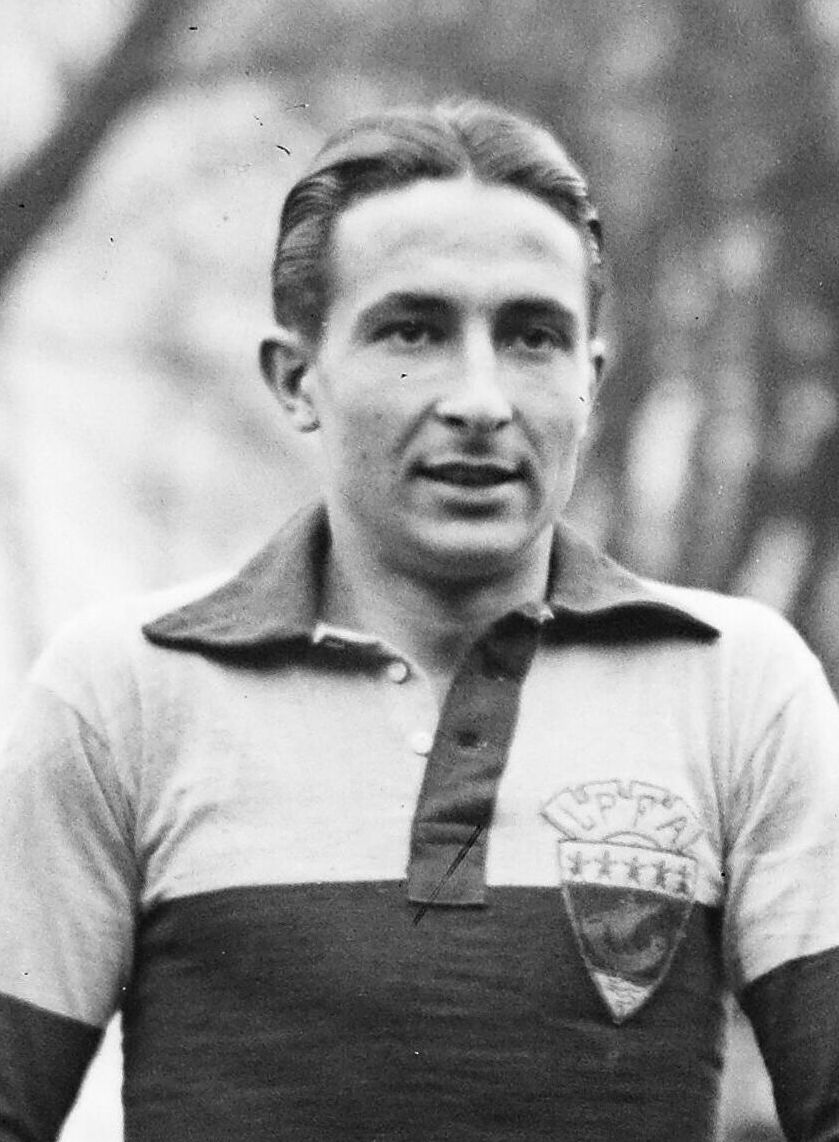

Personal information
- Date of birth: 20 October 1905
- Date of death: 26 November 1990 (aged 85)

International career
| Years | Team | Apps | (Gls) |
| 1927–1929 | France | 8 | (0) |

Jacques Wild (20 October 1905 – 26 November 1990) was a French footballer. He played in eight matches for the France national football team between 1927 and 1929.
