= Georges Moulène =

French footballer (1901–1976)

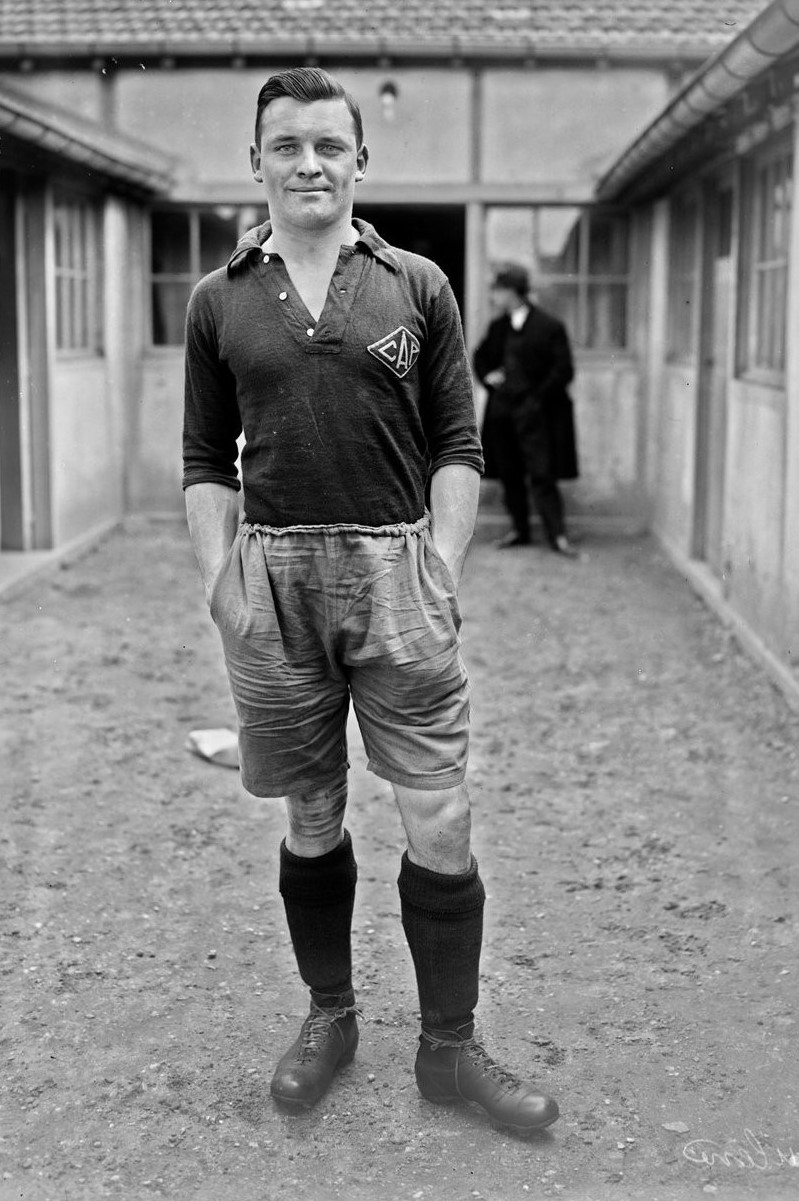
- Moulène in 1927

Personal information
- Full name: Georges Émile Jean Moulène
- Date of birth: 29 October 1901
- Place of birth: 12th arrondissement of Paris, France
- Date of death: 26 March 1976 (aged 74)
- Place of death: Neuilly-sur-Seine, France
- Position: Midfielder

Senior career*
Years	Team	Apps	(Gls)
1921–1927	CA Paris		
1927–1928	Club Français		
1928–1933	CA Paris		

International career
1922	France (unofficial)	+1	(0)
1925	Paris	+2	(0)
1926	France	1	(0)
- * Club domestic league appearances and goals

Georges Émile Jean Moulène (29 October 1901 – 26 March 1976) was a French footballer who played as a midfielder for CA Paris and the French national team in the 1920s.

== Career ==
Born in the 12th arrondissement of Paris on 29 October 1901, Moulène began his career at CA Paris in 1921, aged 20, with whom he played for six years, until 1927, when he moved Club Français.

On 11 June 1922, he started for France in an unofficial match against Norway in Oslo, which ended in a 7–0 loss. In March 1923, he was the only player from CAP who started for the French Army team in a friendly match against the British Army at Shorncliffe, helping his side to a 1–0 victory. On 1 November 1925, he started for the Paris football team in a friendly against Catalonia, scoring once in a 2–3 loss; the following day, the journalists of French newspaper Le Miroir des sports stated that he "did what he could, but in the future, he will have to avoid pushing his opponents too hard". The following month, he started for Paris in a friendly against a Nord selection.

On 11 April 1926, the 24-year-old Moulène earned his first (and only) international cap in a friendly match against Belgium at Stade Pershing, which ended in a 4–3 win. The following day, the journalists of Le Miroir des sports described his performance as "conscientious and courageous, but his uncertain passing and relatively poor mobility do not denote a midfielder of international class".

After leaving Club Français in 1928, Moulène returned to CA Paris, where he played for a further five years until he retired in 1933, aged 32.

== Death ==
Moulène died in Neuilly-sur-Seine on 26 March 1976, at the age of 79.
