= Joseph Alcazar =

Algerian-born French footballer (1910-1987)

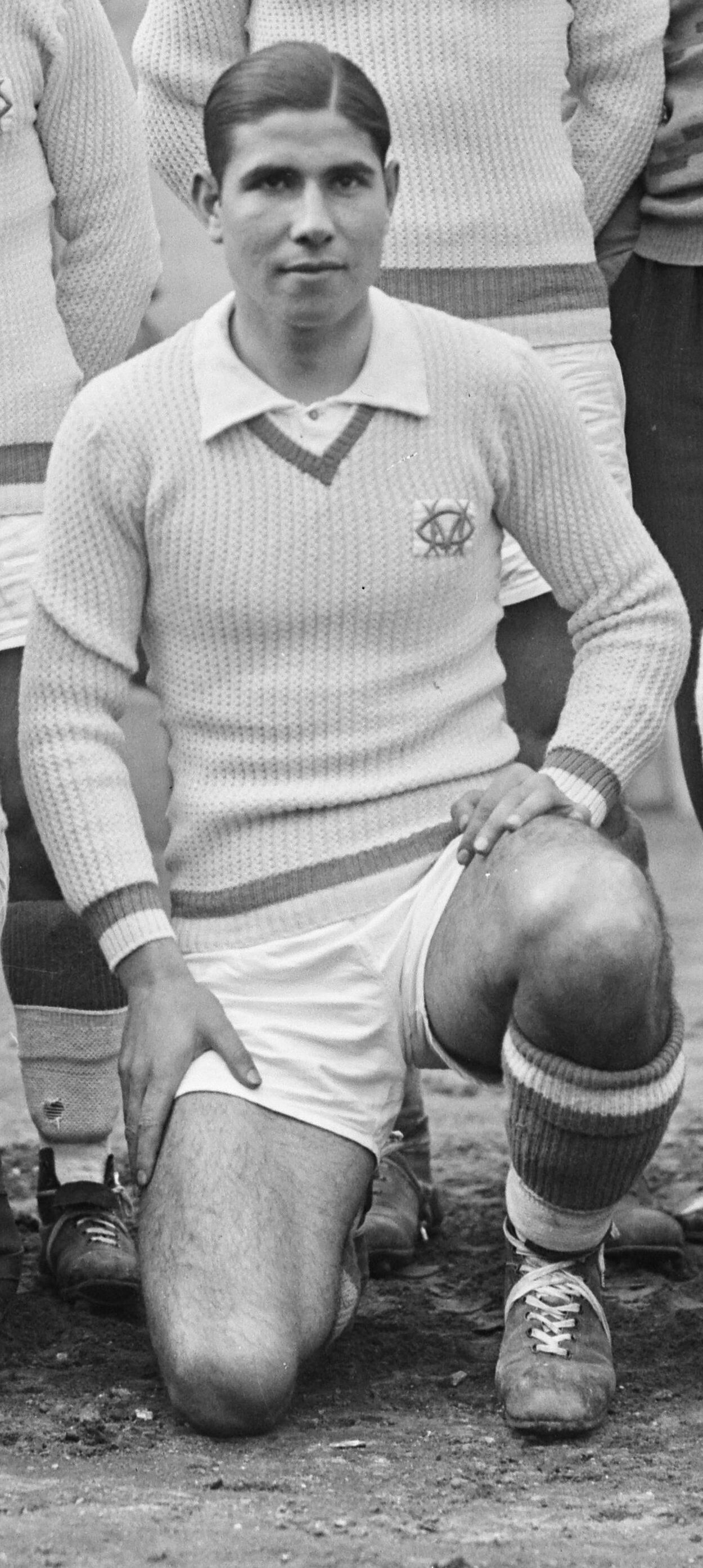
- Alcazar in 1930

Personal information
- Full name: José Antonio Alcazar Garcia
- Date of birth: 1 January 1910
- Place of birth: La Unión, Spain
- Date of death: 21 April 1987 (aged 77)
- Place of death: Aix-en-Provence
- Height: 1.72 m (5 ft 8 in)
- Position: Striker

Youth career
- 1926–1927: CAL Oran

Senior career*
Years	Team	Apps	(Gls)
1927–1936	Marseille		
1936–1937	Olympique Lillois		
1937–1939	Nice		
1939–1940	Olympique Avignonnais		
1940–1942	Marseille		
1942–1943	Château Gombert		
1943–1944	Saint-Tropez		
1944–1945	US Phocéenne		
1945–1946	AS Aix		

International career
1931–1935	France	11	(2)
- * Club domestic league appearances and goals

Joseph Alcazar (1 January 1910 – 21 April 1987) was a football striker. He was part of the France squad at the FIFA World Cup 1934.

He acquired French nationality by naturalization on 4 December 1929.

== Titles ==
=== Olympique de Marseille ===
- Coupe de France: 1934
- Coupe de France runner-up : 1934
