= Fernand Brunel =

French footballer (1907-1927)

Personal information
- Full name: Fernand Brunel
- Date of birth: 9 February 1907
- Place of birth: Lunel, France
- Date of death: 11 March 1927 (aged 20)
- Position: Forward

Fernand Brunel (9 February 1907 - 11 March 1927) was a French international footballer. He played as a striker for Gallia Club Lunel and then FC Sète 34.

== Life ==
Brunel started playing football for the l'Ecole Professionnelle de Nîmes, where he studied. He then enrolled at Lunel College, playing for Gallia Club Lunel's first team from 1922 until 1926. On 18 April 1926 he became a French international soccer player, playing with France against Portugal played at the Stade des Ponts Jumeaux in Toulouse. He scored two goals that day.

He joined FC Sète for the 1926/1927 season. He died on 11 March 1927, at the age of 20 from meningitis while performing his military service in Sète.
