= Georges-Henri Albert =

French footballer (1882-1963)

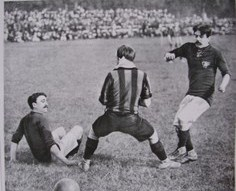
- Albert (left) in 1909

Personal information
- Date of birth: 21 August 1882
- Place of birth: Paris
- Date of death: 15 May 1963 (aged 80)
- Place of death: Verrières-le-Buisson
- Height: 1.65 m (5 ft 5 in)
- Position: Wing-half

Senior career*
Years	Team	Apps	(Gls)
1901–1903	Nationale de Saint-Mandé		
1903–1904	Football Club de Paris		
1908–1910	Cercle athlétique de Paris		
1910–1912	Club Français		
1912–1914	Légion Saint-Michel		

International career
1908	France	1	(0)
- * Club domestic league appearances and goals

Georges-Henri Albert (21 August 1882 – 15 May 1963) was a French footballer. He competed in the men's tournament at the 1908 Summer Olympics.
