= Wim Roetert =

Dutch footballer

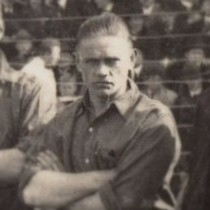
- Roetert in 1923

Personal information
- Full name: Wilhelmus Roetert
- Date of birth: 22 January 1892
- Place of birth: Deventer, the Netherlands
- Date of death: 29 April 1969 (aged 77)
- Position: Forward

Senior career*
| Years | Team | Apps | (Gls) |
- Go Ahead Deventer

International career
| 1923 | Netherlands | 1 | (2) |
- * Club domestic league appearances and goals

Wilhelmus "Wim" Roetert (22 January 1892 – 29 April 1969) was a Dutch footballer who played for Go Ahead Deventer. He featured once for the Netherlands national football team in 1923, scoring two goals.

== Career statistics ==
=== International ===
Appearances and goals by national team and year
| National team | Year | Apps | Goals |
|---|---|---|---|
| Netherlands | 1923 | 1 | 2 |
| Total | | 1 | 2 |

=== International goals ===
Scores and results list the Netherlands' goal tally first.

| No | Date | Venue | Opponent | Score | Result | Competition |
|---|---|---|---|---|---|---|
| 1. | 2 April 1923 | Het Nederlandsch Sportpark, Amsterdam, The Netherlands | France | 1–0 | 8–1 | Friendly |
| 2. | 2 April 1923 | Het Nederlandsch Sportpark, Amsterdam, The Netherlands | France | 3–0 | 8–1 | Friendly |
