= Jules Verlet =

French footballer (1883–1924)

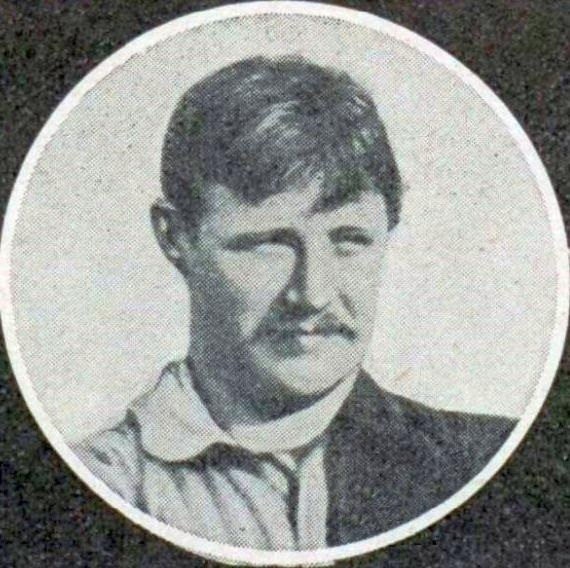
- Joseph Verlet in 1913

Personal information
- Full name: Joseph Louis Verlet
- Date of birth: 16 August 1883
- Place of birth: Asnières-sur-Seine, France
- Date of death: 22 July 1924 (aged 40)
- Place of death: Rennes, France
- Position: Defender

Senior career*
Years	Team	Apps	(Gls)
1903–1912	CA Paris-Charenton		

International career
1904–1911	France		
- * Club domestic league appearances and goals

Joseph Louis "Jules" Verlet (16 August 1883 – 22 July 1924) was a French footballer. He competed in the men's tournament at the 1908 Summer Olympics held in London, England.
