= Marcel Domergue =

Egyptian-born French footballer (born 1901)

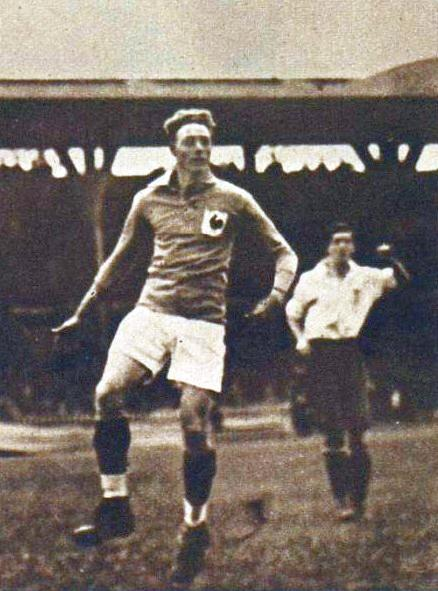
- Domergue in 1926

Personal information
- Full name: Marcel Domergue
- Date of birth: 16 November 1901
- Place of birth: Port Said, Egypt
- Date of death: 25 March 1969 (aged 67)
- Position: Midfielder

Senior career*
Years	Team	Apps	(Gls)
- CASG Paris
1923	Sète		
1923–1930	Red Star FC		
1930	SC Nîmes		

International career
1922–1928	France	20	(0)
- * Club domestic league appearances and goals

Marcel Domergue (16 November 1901 – 25 March 1969) was a French international footballer. He is mostly known for his international career and seven-year club stint at Red Star FC where he won the Coupe de France in 1928. Domergue made his international debut on 30 April 1922 in a 4–0 defeat to Spain. He was a member of the French teams that participated in the football tournament at both the 1924 and 1928 Summer Olympics.

== Sources ==
- Denis Chaumier: Les Bleus. Tous les joueurs de l’équipe de France de 1904 à nos jours. Larousse, o.O. 2004, ISBN 2-03-505420-6
- Yves Dupont: La Mecque du football ou Mémoires d'un Dauphin. Compte d'auteur, Sète 1973
- L'Équipe/Gérard Ejnès: La belle histoire. L’équipe de France de football. L’Équipe, Issy-les-Moulineaux 2004, ISBN 2-03-505420-6
- L’Équipe/Gérard Ejnès: Coupe de France. La folle épopée. L’Équipe, Issy-les-Moulineaux 2007, ISBN 978-2-915535-62-4
- François de Montvalon/Frédéric Lombard/Joël Simon: Red Star. Histoires d’un siècle. Club du Red Star, Paris 1999, ISBN 2-9512562-0-5
- Alfred Wahl/Pierre Lanfranchi: Les footballeurs professionnels des années trente à nos jours. Hachette, Paris 1995, ISBN 978-2-01-235098-4
