= Juste Brouzes =

French footballer (1894-1973)

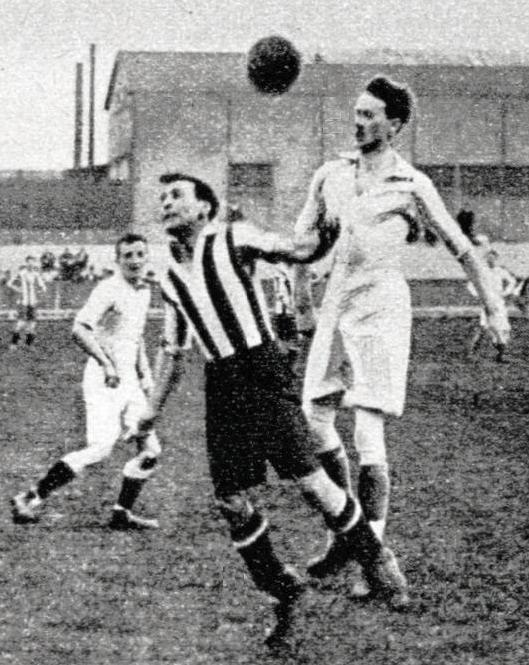
- Juste Brouzes (striped jersey)

Personal information
- Date of birth: 20 January 1894
- Place of birth: Paris, France
- Date of death: 28 February 1973 (aged 79)

International career
Years	Team	Apps	(Gls)
- France

Juste Brouzes (20 January 1894 – 28 February 1973) was a French footballer. He competed in the men's tournament at the 1928 Summer Olympics.
