= Jean Laurent (footballer) =

French footballer (1906–1995)

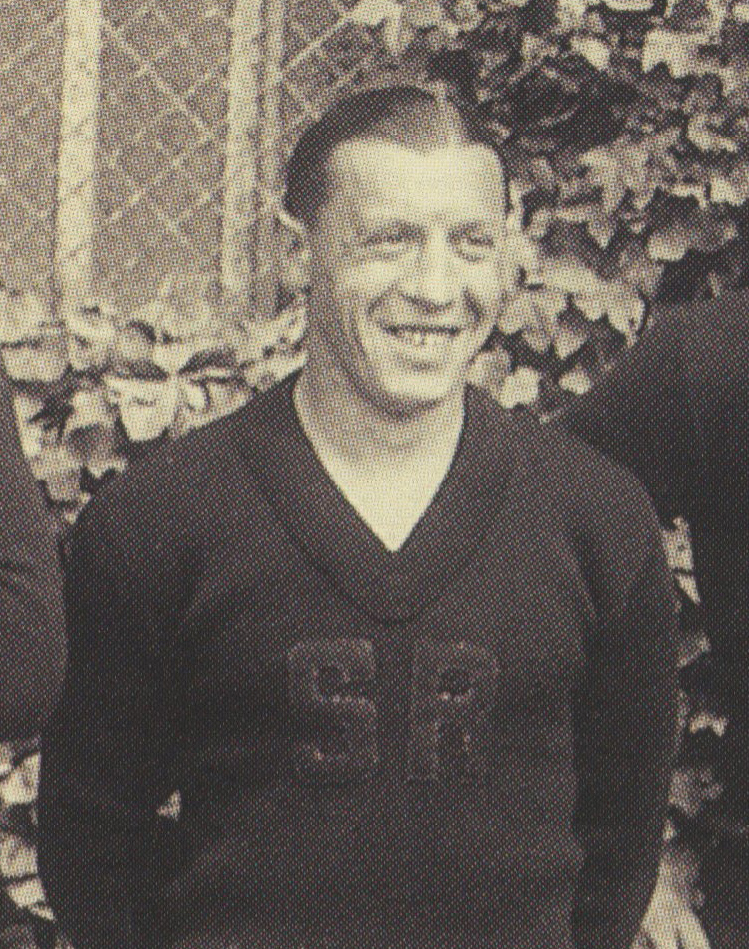
- Laurent in 1935

Personal information
- Full name: Jean Prosper Laurent
- Date of birth: 30 December 1906
- Place of birth: Maisons-Alfort, Val-de-Marne, France
- Date of death: 14 May 1995 (aged 88)
- Place of death: Bourbon-l'Archambault, Allier, France
- Height: 1.76 m (5 ft 9 in)
- Position: Midfielder

Senior career*
Years	Team	Apps	(Gls)
1921–1930	CA Paris		
1930–1932	Sochaux		
1932–1933	Club français		
1933–1934	Saint-Malo		
1934–1937	Rennes		
1937–1938	Toulouse		
1938–1939	Montpellier		

International career
1930–1932	France	8	(0)

Managerial career
- 1945–1946: CA Paris
- * Club domestic league appearances and goals

Jean Prosper Laurent (30 December 1906 – 14 May 1995) was a French footballer. He played as a defender or midfielder. He was the elder brother of Lucien Laurent, and they both took part at the 1930 FIFA World Cup He made eight appearances for the France national team.

== Club career ==
Laurent started his career at CA Paris in 1921. In 1930, he went to FC Sochaux. He then played for Club français for the 1932–33 season. Laurent then went to US Saint-Malo for one year, in 1933–34. From 1934 to 1937, he played for Rennes. He went to Toulouse FC (1937) in its beginning year, 1937–38. His last club was Montpellier in 1938-1939.

== International career ==
Laurent got his first cap on 11 May 1930 against Czechoslovakia. He was part of France's squad for the 1930 FIFA World Cup, but did not play any match of the tournament. He got his eighth and last cap on 12 June 1932 against Romania.

== Coaching career ==
Laurent only had one short stint as a coach, managing his youth club CA Paris for one year, from 1945 to 1946.
