= Marcel Langiller =

French footballer (1908-1980)

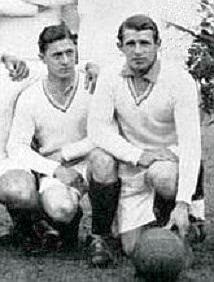

Personal information
- Date of birth: 2 June 1908
- Place of birth: Paris, France
- Date of death: 25 December 1980 (aged 72)
- Place of death: Paris, France
- Position: Striker

Youth career
- 1923–1928: CA Paris

Senior career*
| Years | Team | Apps | (Gls) |
| 1928–1933 | Excelsior Roubaix | | |
| 1933–1934 | Red Star | | |
| 1935-1937 | Saint-Étienne | | |
| 1937–1939 | CA Paris | | |

International career
| 1927–1937 | France | 30 | (7) |
- * Club domestic league appearances and goals

Marcel Langiller (2 June 1908 – 25 December 1980) was a French footballer and is an Olympian. He played in a striker role, and was nicknamed "La Caille". He was part of France’s squad for the 1930 FIFA World Cup

== Club career ==
Langiller was born in Charenton-le-Pont, Val-de-Marne. His youth club was CA Paris from 1923 to 1928.

He started his senior career at Excelsior Athlétic Club de Roubaix in 1928. From 1933 to 1934 he played for Red Star. In 1935, he went to AS Saint-Étienne. In 1937, he went back to his youth club, CA Paris, ending his career in 1939.

== International career ==
His first cap with France was against Spain on 22/05/1927. He scored his first goal against England on 17/05/1928.

He was in the 1928 Olympics French Football team and played France only match in the tournament, a 3-4 defeat against Italy on 29/05/1928

He was part of France’s squad at the 1930 FIFA World Cup, playing France’s all 3 matches in the group stage, and scoring 1 goal against Mexico. This was the third goal of the history of the FIFA World Cup, 20 minutes after his teammate Lucien Laurent scored the first one, and the second one from American player Bart McGhee, came in minute 23, the same-time match between United States and Belgium, at Group 4.

His last cap was against Italy on 05/12/1937. He had 30 caps with France, scoring 7 goals.

== International goals ==
Scores and results list France's goal tally first, score column indicates score after each Langiller goal.

List of international goals scored by Marcel Langiller
| No. | Date | Venue | Opponent | Score | Result | Competition |
|---|---|---|---|---|---|---|
| 1. | 17 May 1928 | Stade Olympique Yves-du-Manoir, Colombes, France | England | 1–0 | 1–5 | Friendly |
| 2. | 13 June 1930 | Estadio Pocitos, Montevideo, Uruguay | Mexico | 2–0 | 4–1 | 1930 FIFA World Cup |
| 3. | 15 February 1931 | Stade Olympique Yves-du-Manoir, Colombes, France | Czechoslovakia | 1–1 | 1–2 | Friendly |
| 4. | 14 May 1931 | Stade Olympique Yves-du-Manoir, Colombes, France | England | 3–1 | 5–2 | Friendly |
| 5. | 8 May 1932 | Stade Olympique Yves-du-Manoir, Colombes, France | Scotland | 1–3 | 1–3 | Friendly |
| 6. | 26 March 1933 | Stade Olympique Yves-du-Manoir, Colombes, France | Belgium | 2–0 | 3–0 | Friendly |
| 7. | 31 October 1937 | Olympic Stadium, Amsterdam, Netherlands | Netherlands | 2–0 | 3–2 | Friendly |

== Honours ==
- Coupe de France in 1933 with Excelsior Roubaix
