= CA Paris-Charenton =

French football club

- Full name: Cercle Athlétique de Paris Charenton
- Founded: 1896; 130 years ago
- Ground: Stade Henri Guérin; Stade de Charentonneau
- Chairman: Oscar Goncalves
Home colours

Cercle Athlétique de Paris Charenton is a French football club which plays in the cities of Charenton-le-Pont and Maisons-Alfort, Val-de-Marne. The team is a merger between CA Paris (founded in 1892) and SO Charentonnais (founded in 1904). The two merged in 1964.

== History ==
CA Paris was founded in 1892 as Nationale de Saint-Mandé, a gymnastic club. In 1896, the football section was founded and took the name of FC Paris. In 1906, the club changed its name to CA Paris in a merge with l'Union Sportive de Paris XII and l'Athlétic Club. The club won the Coupe de France in 1920 and was runner-up in 1928.

The CA Paris played the first two seasons of Ligue 1 in 1932–33 and 1933–34, finishing last with only ten points in 1934. The team remained in league from 1934 to 1963 (except World War II), when it dropped its professional status in 1963. The team merged with SO Charentonnais in 1964 and now plays at a regional level.

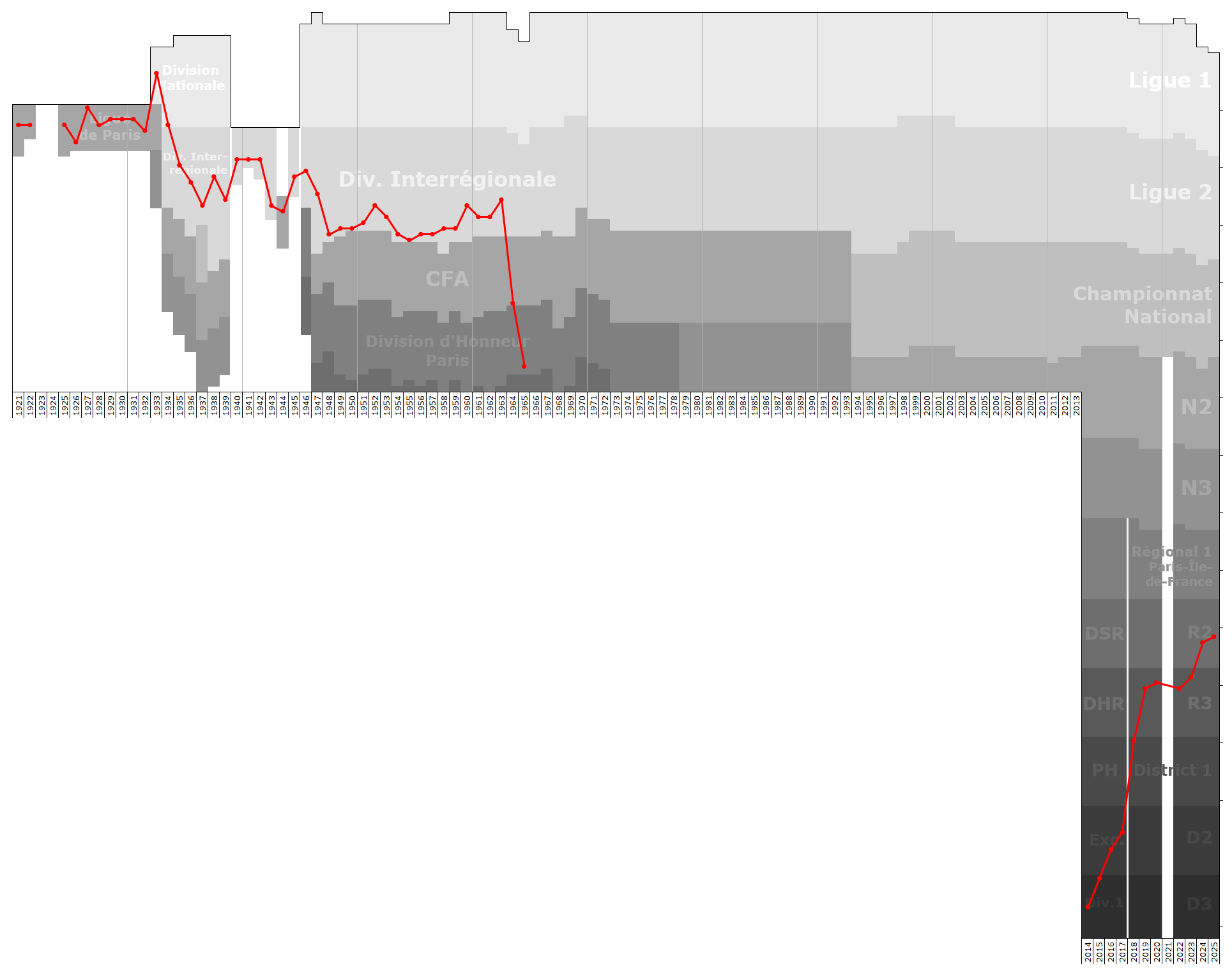
Historical league performance chart of CA Paris-Charenton

== Honours ==
- Coupe de France
  - Winners (1): 1920

== Notable players ==
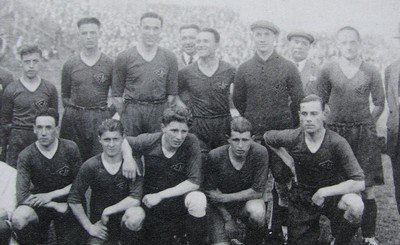
CA Paris-Charenton, runner-up Coupe de France 1928

traditional logo

French international players
  - Tiemoue Bakayoko
- (Matches played for France while at CA Paris)
  - Georges Albert (1; 1908)
  - Henri Bard (10; 1919–1921)
  - Henri Beau "Coulon" (5; 1911)
  - Maurice Beaudier (3; 1921)
  - Maurice Bigue (7; 1911–1914)
  - Charles Bilot (6 [1]; 1904–1912)
  - Georges Bilot (1 [1]; 1904)
  - Gaston Cyprès (6 [2]; 1904–1908)
  - Jean Fidon (1; 1927)
  - Louis Finot (7; 1930–1934)
  - Ernest Gravier (6; 1911)
  - Marcel Langiller (10; 1927–1928 and 1937)
  - Jean Laurent (3; 1930)
  - Lucien Laurent (2; 1930)
  - Louis Mesnier (14 [2]; 1904–1913)
  - Georges Moulène (1; 1926)
  - Georges Ouvray (1; 1928)
  - Marcel Vanco (7; 1920–1922)
  - Joseph Verlet (7 [2]; 1904–1911)

== Managerial history ==
- Alfred Aston 1948–1949
- Albert Dubreucq
- Dominique Mori (1955–1958)
- Eugène Proust (1958– 1959)
- Angelo Grizzetti (1959–1962)
- Ripoll (1962–1964)
