= Lucien Laurent =

French footballer (1907–2005)

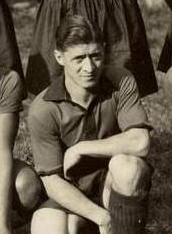

Personal information
- Full name: Lucien Laurent
- Date of birth: 10 December 1907
- Place of birth: Saint-Maur-des-Fossés, France
- Date of death: 11 April 2005 (aged 97)
- Place of death: Besançon, France
- Height: 1.60 m (5 ft 3 in)
- Position: Inside right

Senior career*
Years	Team	Apps	(Gls)
1921–1930	CA Paris		
1930–1932	FC Sochaux-Montbéliard		
1932–1933	Club Français	27	(10)
1933–1934	CA Paris	27	(12)
1934–1935	FC Mulhouse	33	(10)
1935–1936	FC Sochaux-Montbéliard	8	(2)
1936–1937	Rennes	33	(11)
1937–1939	Strasbourg	29	(4)
1939–1943	Toulouse FC		
1943–1946	Besançon RC	1	(0)

International career
1930–1935	France	10	(2)

Managerial career
- 1943-1947: Besançon RC
- 1961: Besançon RC
- * Club domestic league appearances and goals

Lucien Laurent (10 December 1907 – 11 April 2005) was a French footballer who played as a forward. Playing for France, at the 1930 FIFA World Cup, he scored the first ever FIFA World Cup goal, against Mexico.

== Career ==
Laurent was born in Saint-Maur-des-Fossés, Val-de-Marne, near Paris. He was the younger brother of Jean Laurent, who also played football and represented France and was named to the squad for the 1930 World Cup. He was also part of France's squad for the 1928 Summer Olympics, but he did not play in any matches.

Between 1921 and 1930, he played for the semi-professional team Cercle Athlétique de Paris, before being taken on by Sochaux, then a workers team for the car manufacturer Peugeot, where he was employed. As an amateur player, he only received basic compensation from the French Football Federation while at the 1930 World Cup in Uruguay.

At the Estadio Pocitos in Montevideo, Laurent made history by scoring the first ever World Cup goal: a volley in the 19th minute of a game against Mexico on 13 July 1930. France won the game 4–1, but lost their remaining group matches to Argentina and Chile, and were thus eliminated in the group stage. Laurent was ruled out of the third game due to an injury.

Laurent was named to the French squad for the 1934 World Cup, but was unable to play due to an injury. He later moved to Rennes, playing for them until 1937, then for RC Strasbourg until 1939. In all, Laurent played 10 times for France, but scored only one other goal against England in May 1931.

He joined the French armed forces during World War II, but spent three years as a prisoner of war in Saxony before being released in 1943. He played two years of wartime football for Besançon before retiring in 1946, opting to become a trainer and youth coach. He was the only surviving member of the 1930 French team to see France lift the 1998 FIFA World Cup on home soil, and died seven years later at the age of 97 in Besançon.

Laurent is buried is Vesoul.

== Career statistics ==
=== List of international goals scored by Lucien Laurent ===
France's goal tally first

#	Date	Venue	Opponent	Score	Result	Competition
1.	13 July 1930	Estadio Pocitos, Montevideo, Uruguay	Mexico	1–0	4–1	1930 FIFA World Cup
2.	14 May 1931	Stade Olympique Yves-du-Manoir, Colombes, France	England	1–1	5–2	Friendly

== Honours ==
CA Paris

- Coupe de France runner-up : 1928

FC Sochaux

- Peugeot Cup: 1931

Sporting positions
Preceded by First edition	FIFA World Cup opening goal 1930	Succeeded by Ernesto Belis
