= Henri Jooris =

French businessman, industrialist, and sports manager

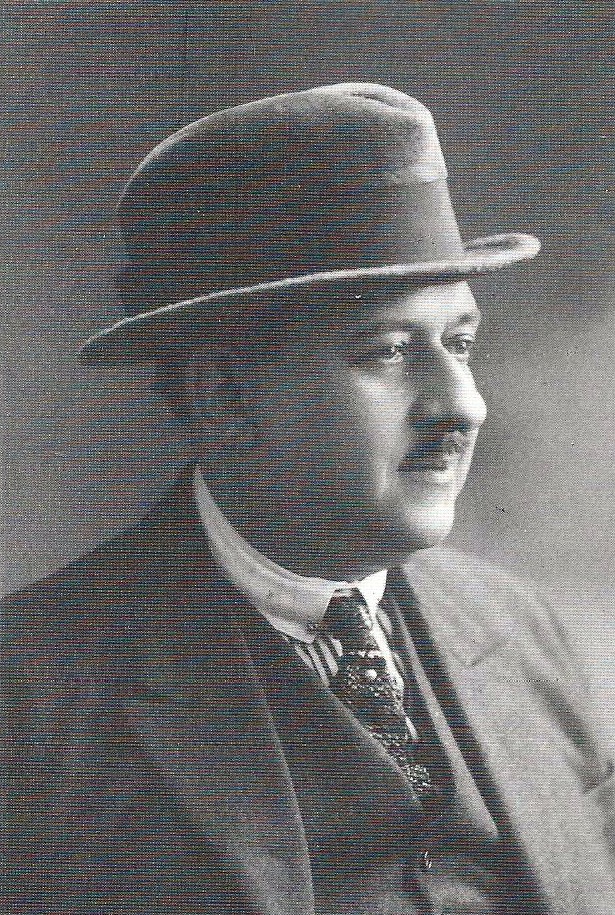
- Henri Jooris

President of Olympique Lillois
- In office 1919–1932
- Preceded by: Dr. Eugene Hennart
- Succeeded by: Gabriel Caullet

President of LNFA
- In office 1919–1924
- Succeeded by: Henri Fonteilles

Vice-president of the FFF
- In office 1919–1924

Personal details
- Born: 23 April 1879 Lille, France
- Died: 29 March 1940 (aged 60) Cannes, France
Association football career
Managerial career
- Years: Team
- 1912–1914: Northern France

Henri Jooris (23 April 1879 – 29 March 1940) was a French businessman, industrialist, and sports manager. He is widely regarded as one of the most important figures of football in the Nord in the first half of the 20th century.

Throughout his life, he combined economic commitments with several sporting functions in the management of sports clubs, federations, and leagues, serving as the president of both Olympique Lillois (1919–32) and the Northern Football Association League (LNFA, 1919–24), the vice-president of the French Football Federation (1919–24), and was also a benefactor member of ten sports companies. Under his presidency, the LNFA became one of the leading leagues in France, with more than 20,000 members and nearly 600 clubs, including OL, which became one of the great clubs in France during his presidency, winning the LNFA four times, along with the inaugural edition of the French professional championship in 1932–33, which he had first proposed on a letter addressed to Jules Rimet in 1929. The home stadium of Olympique Lillois, which hosted a quarter-final in the 1938 World Cup, was named after him.

As a businessman, he was nicknamed the "first baker of France", being one of the great bosses of the North of France between the two world wars. He was noted for his permanent interventionism and outrageous authoritarianism, two character traits that explain as much his successes as his relative failures.

== Early life ==
Henri Jooris was born in Lille on 23 April 1879, as the son of a grocery store owner on rue d'Esquermes in Lille.

== Sporting career ==
=== First titles with Olympique Lillois ===
In 1910, the 31-year-old Jooris, then a young and authoritarian industrialist, full of ambition, began challenging the then president of Olympique Lillois, André Billy, whose ideas frequently opposed those of Jooris, so much so, that the two leaders had a falling out and nearly fought a duel. On 19 February 1911, Billy and Jooris witnessed OL win the first title of its history, the USFSA Northern Championship, following a 3–0 victory over RC Roubaix, thus finally putting an end to the invincibility of Roubaix and US Tourquennoise, but despite the club's success, Billy lost the loyalty of OL's board of directors to Jooris, who was named the club's vice-presidency in 1911, which caused the former to resign and create a rival team in 1912, Club Lillois, taking half the team with him. Jooris thus replaced him as "de facto" leader of the club before becoming its official president in May 1919, after its merger with Billy's Club Lillois. (Note: Between 1911 and 1919, OL's president apparently was a certain Dr. Eugene Hennart, but the exact dates of his term remain unknown.)

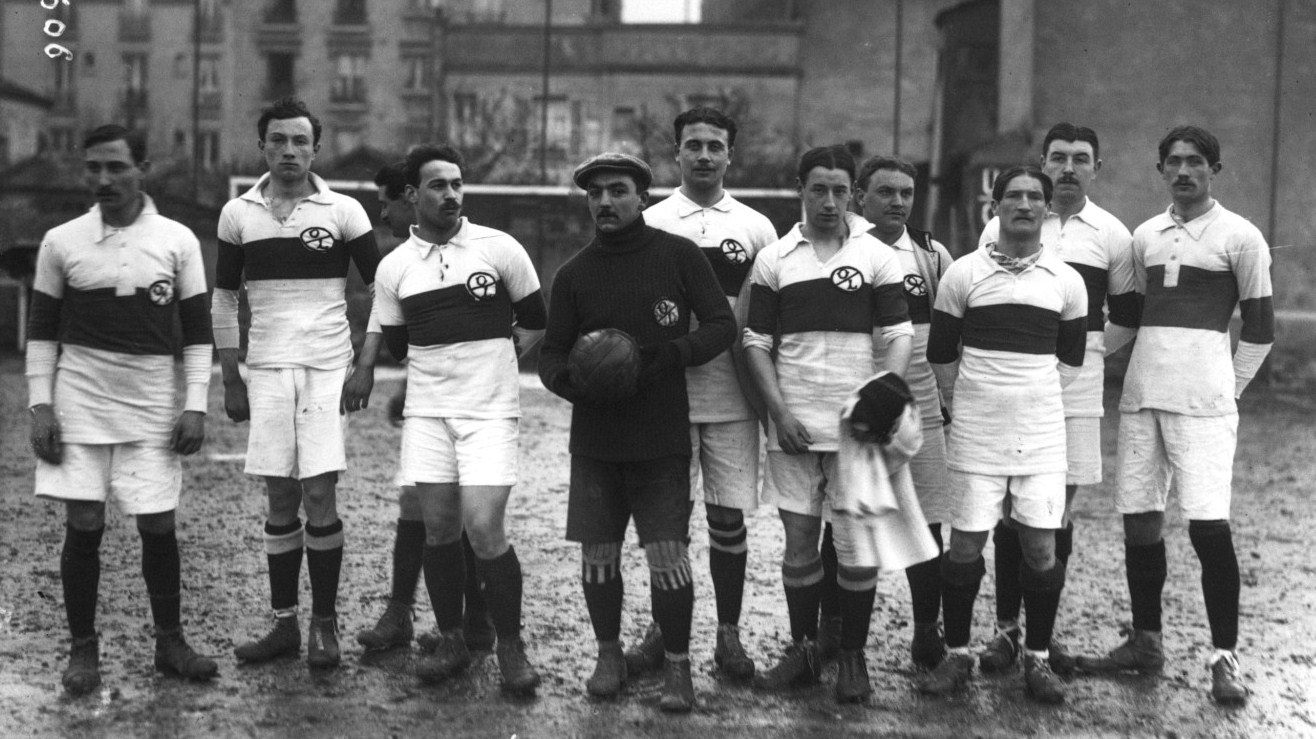
Olympique lillois on 22 March 1914 before its USFSA semi-final.

In order to accomplish his ambition of making Olympique Lillois the "citadel of regional football", Jooris began recruiting talented players from outside the USFSA, such as Alphonse Six, Belgian champion with Brugeois, and the Frenchman Jean Ducret, from Étoile des Deux Lacs (a Parisian club affiliated with the FGSPF), as well as professional English coaches, such as Charlie Williams in 1911, a former coach of Denmark, and Maurice Bunyan. Furthermore, he organized matches across Europe to increase the confrontations against foreign teams (Slavia Prague, Tunbridge Wells, Ghent, among others), and partly financed and carried out the modernization of the old Victor Boucquey stadium on the banks of the Deûle, which now has a capacity of 5,000 seats. These actions undertaken by Jooris paid off as it allowed OL to win a further two USFSA Northern Championships in 1913 and 1914, which was followed by a triumph at the 1914 USFSA Football Championship on 5 April, beating Olympique Cettois 3–0 in the final in Paris, in front of nearly 1,000 Lille supporters who arrived by special trains.

This victory allowed the club to compete in the last edition of the Trophée de France, an inter-federation national competition organized by the CFI; OL won the semifinals with a 4–1 victory over FEC Levallois, champions of the Ligue de Football Association (LFA), and then won the final on 26 April with another 4–1 victory over VGA Médoc, winners of the FCAF, thus claiming a trophy that had been donated by Pierre de Coubertin himself. The final was delayed 15 minutes because OL's leaders threaten to forfeit if Albert Clark, who two weeks prior had played for Plumstead, takes part in the match, but in the end, Jooris, while having reservations, accepted the fight. With an average of 400 spectators per match, the unconditional support of the club's fanbase, the presence in its ranks of eight international players, and the accumulation of titles made OL the leading club of northern football on the eve of the First World War.

=== Managerial career ===
In 1912, Jooris took up Billy's idea of the Paris-Nord matches by creating the Lions des Flandres, a scratch team representing Northern France, in order to organize inter-regional meetings against the Paris football team, which would serve as a springboard for possible selection to the French national team. This selection was made up of the best players from the biggest clubs in the Nord, especially the three flagship clubs of the Lille metropolis: RC Roubaix, US Tourquennoise, and Olympique Lillois. On 4 January 1914, the Lions claimed a famous 3–0 win over Paris, with two of the goals being scored by OL players, Albert Eloy and Alphonse Six, and four months later, in May 1914, a team made up of Northerners asserted their superiority over the Normans (5–0) in the so-called Coupe Henri Jooris.

Jooris was the secretary of the Lions des Flandres between 1912 and 1914, and as such, he was the one in charge of setting up schedules and organizing trips, including one to Bilbao in May 1914, and he also had a big say on the composition of the team, together with the coach Fernand Desrousseaux, which resulted in the selection of several players from OL. This allowed many of them to subsequently reach the national team, so during this period, OL had as many as eight international players in its ranks (Degouve, Ducret, Gravelines, Montagne, Six (Belgium), Eloy, Chandelier, Voyeux); on one occasion, in a friendly match against Switzerland on 9 March 1913, France fielded four OL players at the same time. This happened because several Parisian players had withdrawn from the match at the last minute (there was no contractual obligation at the time), with Jooris then helping the selection committee to patch up the team by convincing the OL players to travel to Geneva in exchange for a bonus, which turned out to be two bottles of champagne. His influence in the national team did not stop there, since OL's home stadium, whose improvement was partly financed by Jooris, hosted France's international match against Belgium on 25 January 1914.

Thanks to the triumphs of both Lions des Flandres and OL in the early 1910s, it can reasonably be said that northern football was the best in France during that period, but then the First World War broke out, in which Northern France was occupied for 4 years, thus interrupting the activities of the team and causing the death of many of its players, including Alphonse Six in 1916. In December 1915, Jooris, then a subsistence officer in Saint-Aubin-lès-Elbeuf, created OL's bulletin because he wanted to occupy his leisure time while doing useful work. An officer during the First World War, he became the founding president of the Sports Committee of the Invaded Regions.

=== President of LNFA ===
In the aftermath of the War, northern football had to be reconstructed, and thus, on 19 August 1919, the Northern Football Association League (LNFA) was founded by twenty clubs, and Jooris, who was now also the vice-president of the FFF, relied on the reputation of the pre-war OL and his skills proven during his term on the sports committee of the Invaded Regions to be logically elected as the first president of the LNFA. In 1920, Jooris obtained from the FFF a sum of 3,000 francs "intended to help the widows and descendants of northern footballers who had died for France". At the same time, he prepared war damage files intended to restore destroyed sports facilities as quickly as possible because, as he himself declared, "if we give money to agriculture, why not to sport?".

From 1920 onwards, the ordinary activity of the LNFA was to hold commission meetings every week to set the harmonization of calendars and regulations, the redefinition of the architecture of competitions, and the management of disputes. Similar to the championships of honor created in the other regional football leagues, Jooris created the Division of Honor of the North (DH Nord), composed of the best teams in the region, including OL, who was champion of the North four times (1921, 1922, 1929, and 1931) and vice-champion four times (1920, 1923, 1924, and 1928). Legend has it that on the evenings of OL's football victories, the Bellevue café on the Grand-Place, in which Jooris had some business, would hoist a flag in the club's colours, red and white. During this period, Jooris hired another English coach, Charles Griffiths. Despite becoming a heavyweight in the Nord, OL struggled to confirm this reputation in the Coupe de France, because in its first five participations in the national cup, the club only reached the quarter-finals twice.

Under his presidency, the LNFA became the second-largest League in France, with 279 clubs and 6,818 licensees in 1922. Comfortably re-elected in 1922, Jooris was forced to resign from this position two years later, which changed a trajectory that had been upward until then.

=== Brown amateurism ===
At a time when supporters of amateurism (Frantz Reichel, Charles Simon) were opposed by leaders of large regional clubs (OL, OM, Sète) who knew that the advent of professionalism was inevitable, the FFF actively fought against "brown amateurism", which was the illegal payment of an officially amateur athlete, and the OL had been suspected of that for several years; for instance, the press reported on a payment paid to coach Charlie Williams in 1911. By endorsing these practices within his own club while his elected functions within the LNFA obliged him to denounce them, Jooris found himself in an untenable situation. For instance, on 28 December 1921, the LNFA's office chaired by Jooris annulled the result of a match between US Bruay and Stade Béthunois because the latter had fielded an English professional player, thus defending the interests of amateur clubs while at the same time he was running a club where the practices that he was denouncing were commonplace.

Inevitably, in 1924, this scandal finally struck OL and its president, when a dispute between Jooris and the OL treasurer prompted the latter to reveal to the press that nearly 8,000 francs from the club's budget were allocated to paying the first team. The revelation of these facts forced the FFF to suspended Jooris from all official functions until 1927, which forced him to resign from the presidency of the LNFA; however, he announced that he was doing so on the grounds of professional constraints and a possible entry into politics.

=== Comeback ===
Quarantined in the mid-1920s, Jooris would nevertheless play an active role in this "great turning point in French football" that was the advent of professionalism. Weakened within his own club, he had to regain the trust of the leaders of small amateur clubs while continuing to develop elite football within the LNFA, being runner-up of the DH Nord in 1928 and then winning it in 1929. He was therefore re-elected president of the Northern League in 1929.

Later that year, Jooris asked the socialist municipality for a contribution to finance the renovation of the stands of an already dilapidated stadium, but he was met with a flat refusal from the mayor of Lille, who stated that OL "generated no revenue".

=== Professionalism ===
On 12 June 1929, in a letter addressed to Jules Rimet, Jooris argued for a National Championship to bring together the best teams from each regional league at the end of the season, and in order not to make the calendar too heavy, he defended a formula of a more elitist national championship that would not only attract an ever-increasing audience, but also serve as an intermediate solution between amateurism and professionalism. In May 1931, he even joined forces with Georges Bayrou and Emmanuel Gambardella, among others, to contact clubs likely to join the national professional championship, but despite being a fervent supporter of professionalism until then, his position would change in the following months.

When professionalism in French football was finally established in early 1932, Jooris welcomed this outcome, but deplored the fact that an intermediate solution could not be found, stating that he "would have liked us to proceed in stages". Furthermore, OL's adoption of professional status would not be without risks, particularly financial ones, since he feared an explosion in costs, especially in the payroll of coaches; not to mention that he was also the vice-president of the Northern League, and thus feared that OL's adoption of professional status would tarnish the fine reputation that he was gradually rebuilding. For all these reasons, on 9 March 1932, Jooris handed his resignation to the board of directors of OL, and the club's vice-president, the banker Gabriel Caullet, succeeded him. This is how, at first, he did not support OL's candidacy to compete in the first French championship in history, but when SC Fives, a minor club in the region, became professional on 22 July, Jooris got scared and changed his mind again, submitting an application in turn, and even though the official deadline had already passed, this application was accepted a week later, on 29 July.

There were, therefore, two Lille clubs in the first professional French championship in 1932–33, which was won by OL, thus becoming the first official champions of France. Following his resignation in March 1932, Jooris was named the president of OL's honorary committee in the spring of 1932, but despite being officially retired, he remained a very influential and interventionist figure in OL, including on the composition of the team. For instance, OL's coach Robert de Veen organized his team in a 2-3-5 tactical system instead of the then famous "WM" system (3-2-2-3), only because Jooris had always refused to adopt the latter. However, OL quickly ran into financial difficulties, and the fears of Jooris were later confirmed when during the 1933–34 season, the club's deficit fluctuated around the 150,000 francs, not only because of the cost of the new stands, but also due to the number of transfers that Ligue 1 made necessary. At the LNFA general meeting, Jooris mentioned the consequences that this rapid transition to full professionalism had on northern football.

=== Other functions ===
Jooris saw associative commitment as an effective way of strengthening local roots and reputation, but Jooris' quest for these associative commitments became unhealthy as he accumulated more and more titles and functions, holding multiple positions in various sports clubs, such as vice-president of the French Football Federation (FFF), President of the pre-Olympic Commission (1924), Honorary President of the French Tennis Federation, of the national federation of Jeu de Paume, of the Northern Athletics League, of hockey, of basketball, and of wrestling leagues, as well as the cycling section of OL, president of the Northern Group of Physical Education Medalists and member of the Higher Council of Physical Education.

Jooris was sometimes criticized for this excess; for instance, in February 1935, after he declined to become an honorary member of the Iris Club de Croix, the French press described him as "the man who does not know exactly how many sports or other societies he is the President of". However, it was all of these commitments that justified his elevation to the rank of Knight of the Legion of Honor in April 1922.

In 1936, Jooris was president of the Union of Leagues. In 1939, OL reached its first-ever final of the Coupe de France in 1939 after notably eliminating FC Nancy and FC Sète, but then lost to Racing Club de Paris in Colombes by a score of 3–0; after this defeat, Jooris left all his functions within OL.

== Business and industrial career ==
Before the War, Jooris founded Excelsior, a large cooperative bakery, which later became l'Indépendante, the first industrial bakery in the North of France in the interwar period. He also managed a few hotels and taverns, as a mutual insurance administrator.

The life of OL ended up merging with that of the Jooris companies, since the club's head office and its meetings would take place at the Bellevue café or at the Taverne Excelsior, which was owned by Jooris. In the late 1920s, the Taverne Excelsior was also used as the head office of Rugby Amateur Club Lillois, a club based in Lambersart that reached the semifinals in the 3rd series French championship in 1929.

== Political career ==
For some, football appears to be the perfect authoritarian sport because as early as 1901, the newspaper Tous les sports proclaimed: "The republic works very nice in politics, but on the football field, there is only one form of government that is capable of leading a team to victory: it is Caesarism, in other words, absolute power in the hands of the leader", and Jooris quickly realized that this was also the best form of government outside the pitches, hence why he was politically involved in the extreme right, joining and supporting the Jeunesses Patriotes, which in the 1930s, were inspired by the authoritarian methods and practices of fascist regimes.

Due to his political convictions, he did not hesitate to castigate the use of foreign players from 1934, even if they were talented.

== Death and legacy ==
Jooris died in Cannes on 29 March 1940, at the age of 61. Two years after his death, in 1942, OL's home stadium was renamed in his honor, and two years after that, in 1944, OL merged with fellow Lille club SC Fives, thus establishing Lille OSC, a project that already had been envisaged for several years, in particular by Jooris.

In May 2023, his grandson Michel-Henri Jooris attended a meeting organized by OL to celebrate the 90th birthday of its triumph at the inaugural edition of the French professional championship.
