= 1914 Trophée de France =

Tournament details
- Country: France (CFI)
- Dates: 19 – 26 April
- Teams: 4

Final positions
- Champions: Olympique Lillois (1st title)
- Runners-up: VGA Médoc

Tournament statistics
- Matches played: 3
- Goals scored: 15 (5 per match)
- Top goal scorer: Alphonse Six (4 goals)

The 1914 Trophée de France was the 8th and last edition of the Trophée de France, a football competition organized by the French Interfederal Committee (CFI) and which pits the champions of each federation that makes up the CFI against each other at the end of the season. The competition was held on the road between 19 and 26 April, and it was won by Olympique Lillois, the USFSA champions, after claiming a 4–1 victory over VGA Médoc, the FCAF champions, in the final at Stade de Charentonneau.

== Participants ==
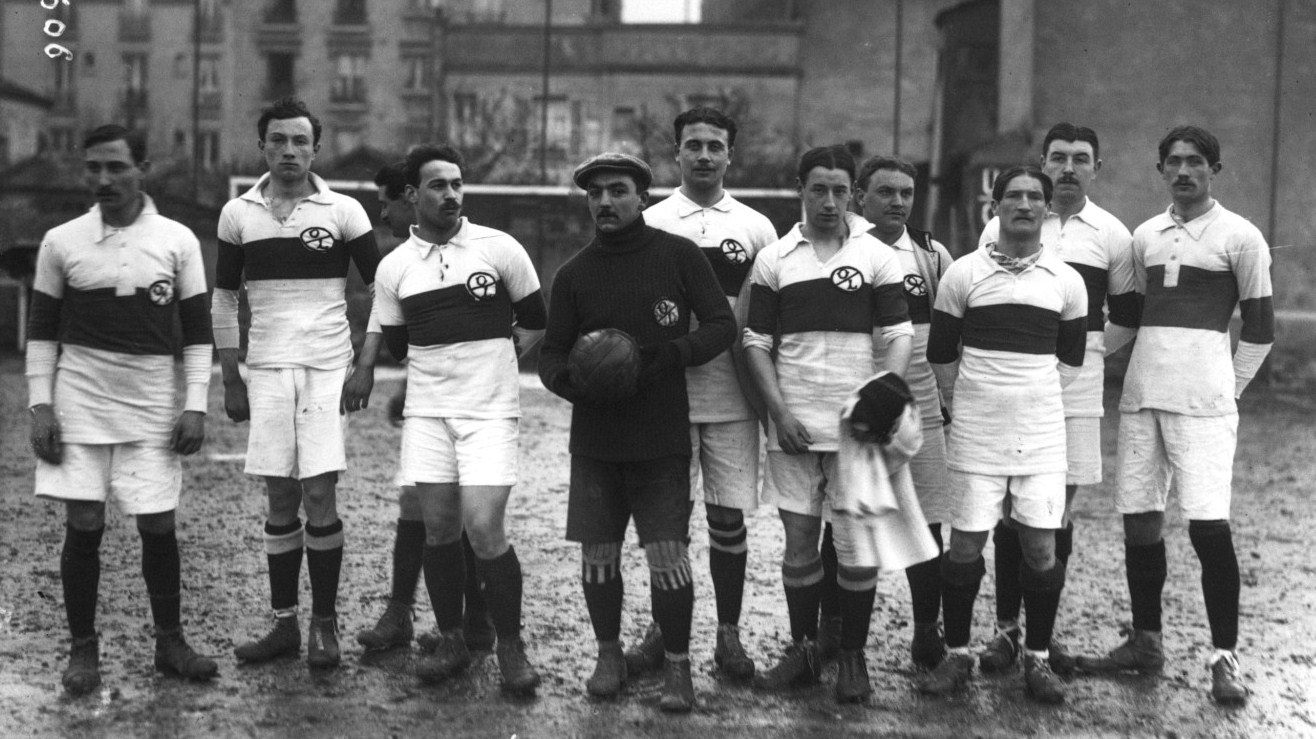
Olympique lillois on 22 March 1914 before its USFSA semi-final.

Olympique Lillois (OL) had been on the rise ever since Henri Jooris became the club's de facto leader in 1911, as he recruited talented players from outside the USFSA, such as Alphonse Six, Belgian champion with Brugeois, and Jean Ducret of Étoile des Deux Lacs, a Parisian club affiliated with the FGSPF, as well as professional English coaches, such as Charlie Williams and Maurice Bunyan. These actions undertaken by Jooris paid off as it allowed OL to win two USFSA Northern Championships in 1913 and 1914, which was followed by a triumph at the 1914 USFSA national championship on 5 April, beating Olympique Cettois 3–0 in the final in Paris, in front of nearly 1,000 Lille supporters who arrived by special trains.

The champions of the 1913–14 championship of the Ligue de Football Association (LFA) was FEC Levallois, who won the title with 24 points, four more than runner-up US Suisse.

The champions of the 1914 FGSPF championship was Patronage Olier, beating Bons Gars Bordeaux 3–1 in the final held in Paris, and the champions of the FCAF was VGA Médoc.

Clubs	Town	Federation
Olympique Lillois	Lille	Union des sociétés françaises de sports athlétiques (USFSA)
FEC Levallois	Levallois-Perret	Ligue de Football Association (LFA)
(Bordeaux) VGA Médoc	Bordeaux	French Amateur Cycling Federation (FCAF)
(Paris) Patronage Olier	Paris	Gymnastic and Sports Federation of French Patronages (FGSPF)

== Tournament ==
=== Semifinals ===
USFSA's champions Olympique Lillois were considered the favorites to win the title, especially their semifinal clash against LFA's champions FEC Levallois on 19 April at Roubaix, due to the great physical superiority of the northern players who were "head and shoulders above the small Levalloisiens". OL took the lead in the first half with a volley from Albert Eloy in a well-given corner by Marcel Vignoli. At the start of the second half, Levallois gave it their all to equalize, but a brace from Paul Chandelier ended their momentum. At this point, Levallois' captain, contesting a referee's decision, pretended to leave the field with his team; but he was dissuaded from doing so, and Levallois courageously resumed the game, which only became harder since OL then scored a fourth via Alphonse Six. Levallois still managed to salvage a small measure of dignity and honor thanks to a consolation goal in the form of a long shot from Félix Romano. Levallois, described as "a scientific but too light team", thus succumbed to the unionists by 4 goals to 1.

In the other semifinal, also held on 19 April, but in Gironde, the two-time champions Patronage Olier faced the new FCAF champions, VGA Médoc, and after both teams scored a penalty in the first half, it was Olier who took the 2–1 lead with a well-conducted attack that was finished by Bonnefoy after a cross from Conrod. Médoc replied by making up a siege on PO's goal, and after narrowly missing a ready-made goal, since the goalkeeper had abandoned his woods, they scored twice to make it 3–2, thus ensuring victory.

=== Final ===
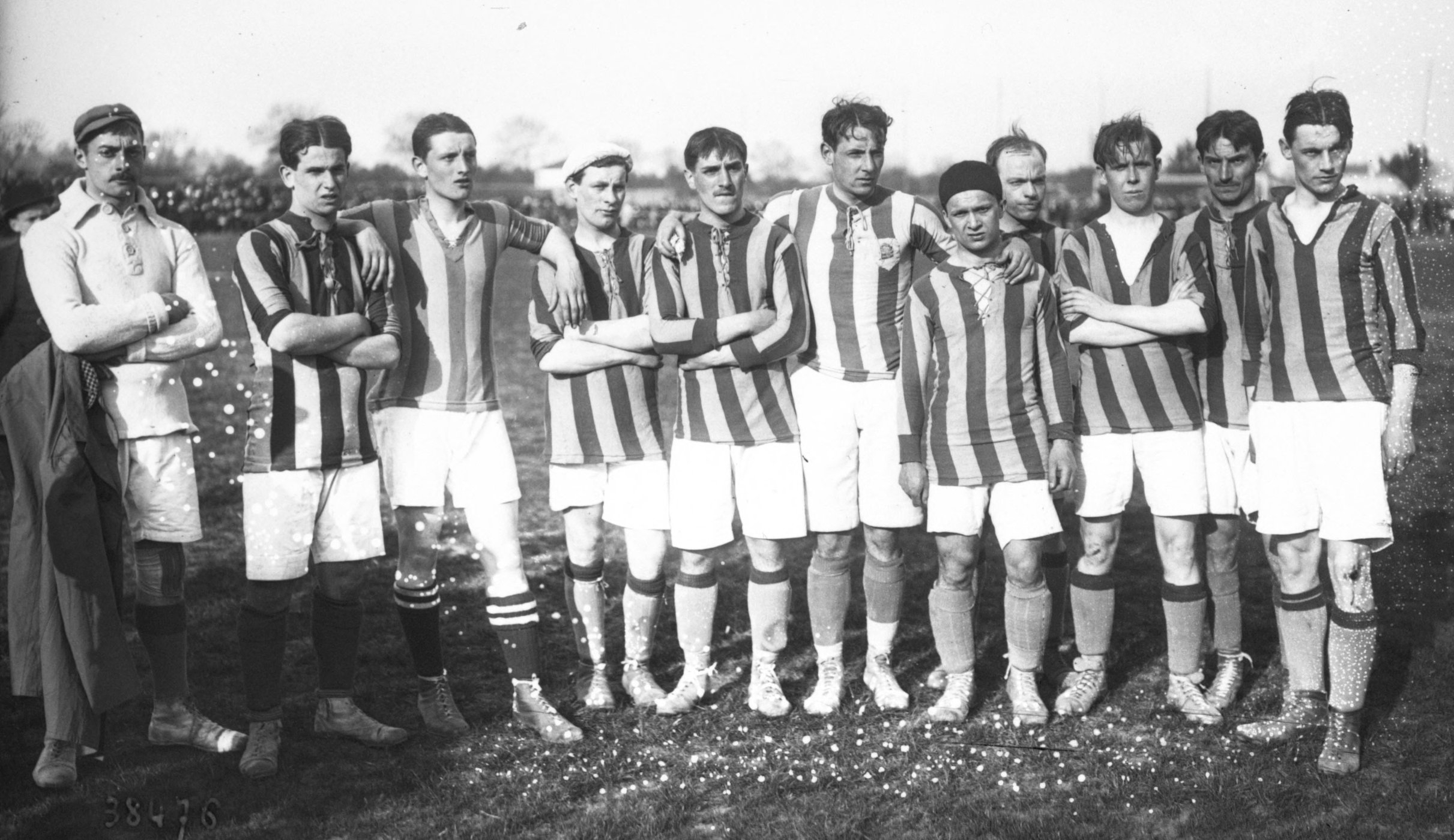
The team of VGA Médoc ahead of the final.

The final was held on 26 April at the Charentonneau in Paris; the crowd of the capital already had the opportunity to see OL at work twice during the qualifiers of the USFSA national championship, with victories over US Servannaise and Olympique de Cette, and the fierce energy of the northern region deployed in those matches had left a lasting impression on the Parisians, who thus considered them the favourites to win. Médoc, however, was rather unknown to the people of Paris, and its arrival raised real curiosity. The final was delayed 15 minutes because OL's leaders threatened to forfeit if Clark, who two weeks prior had played for Plumstead FC, took part in the match, but in the end, Henri Jooris, despite having reservations, accepted the fight.

Médoc won the coin toss and took advantage of it to leave OL with the sun in their eyes, but despite this, it was OL who started better, mainly thanks to the virtuosity of Chandelier, whose passes gave excellent opportunities to Six and Eloy, and a goal was even scored by captain Jean Ducret, but was disallowed due to offside, so Chandelier decided to take it upon himself, converting a good pass from Maurice Gravelines into the opening goal just seven minutes after the kick-off. Six then scored twice to give OL a 3–0 before halftime, first on the rebound of a Chandelier shot that was cleared by Médoc's goalkeeper Marcé, and the second on a cross from the winger Mollet. In the second half, two attacks from Médoc disturb the peace of OL's goalkeeper Carpentier, and force their defenders Jouvel and Jean Degouve to show, the first his flexibility, the second his power. However, it was OL who scored when Six, following a fine personal effort, scored the best goal of the match from 20 meters, thus sealing his hat-trick. As a result, Médoc starts to play a bit more harshly and Six is hit on the eyebrow; the game then became confusing, but Médoc managed to save the honor of the south with a goal from Sample.

OL thus won the Trophée de France for the first time in its history, comes to receive from the hands of Jules Rimet the shield constituting this trophy, which had been donated by Pierre de Coubertin himself. The journalists of La Vie au grand air described the match "as choppy, imprecise, interrupted by stops, to allow the men to recover from the violent shocks".

=== Semi-final ===
19 April 1914

VGA Médoc	3 – 2	Patronage Olier
Tuloche 1–0' (pen.) 3–2' ? 2–2'	Report	Tossier 1–1' (pen.); Bonnefoy 1–2'

Vélodrome de la Côte d'Argent, Talence, Gironde
Referee: Prévost

19 April 1914

Olympique Lillois	4 – 1	FEC Levallois
Eloy 1–0'; Chandelier 2–0', 3–0'; Six 4–0'	Report	Romano 4–1'

., Roubaix
Referee: G. Jandin

=== Final ===
26 April 1914

Olympique Lillois	4 – 1	VGA Médoc
Chandelier 7'; Six 2–0', 3–0', 4–0' Carpentier; Degouve, Jouvel; Gravelines, Ducret (capt.), Montagne; Vignoli, Six, Eloy, Chandelier, Mollet	Report1; Report2	Sample 4–1' Marcé; Kiefer, Rodel; Gasqueton, Clark, Moreau; Gasqueton, Tuloche, Dupeyron, Sample, Angoso

Stade de Charentonneau, Maisons-Alfort, Paris
Referee: J. Thibaudeau

== Statistics ==
=== Top Scorers ===
Rank	Player	Team	Goals
1	Alphonse Six	Olympique Lillois	4
2	Paul Chandelier	Olympique Lillois	3
3	Tuloche	VGA Médoc	2

== See also ==
- 1914 USFSA Football Championship
