= Jean Degouve =

French footballer (1889–1979)

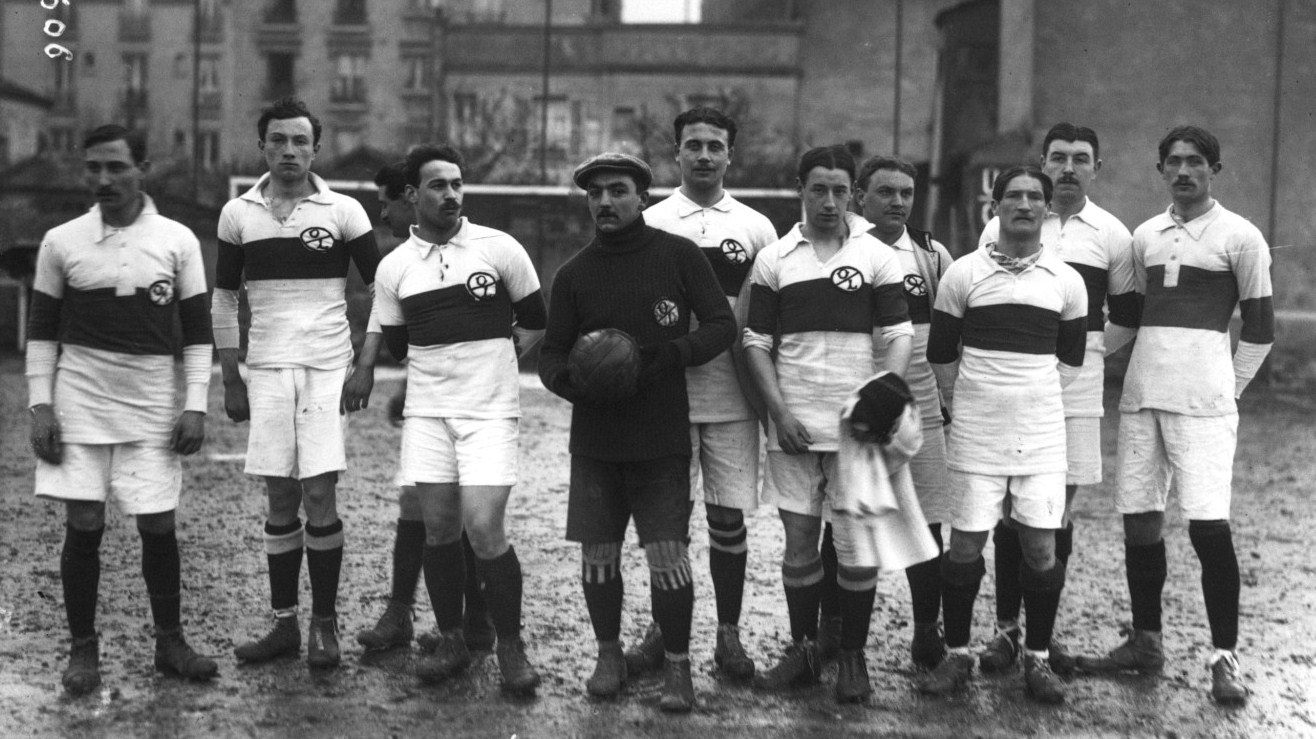
- Degouve (second, from the right) in 1914

Personal information
- Full name: Jean Gaston Louis Degouve de Nuncques
- Date of birth: 19 August 1889
- Place of birth: Bléharies, Belgium
- Date of death: 6 April 1979 (aged 89)
- Place of death: France
- Height: 1.80 m (5 ft 11 in)
- Position: Defender

Senior career*
Years	Team	Apps	(Gls)
1903–1909	RC Arras		
1909–1914	Olympique Lillois		

International career
1913–1914	France	2	(0)
1913	Northern France	3	(0)
- * Club domestic league appearances and goals

Jean Gaston Louis Degouve de Nuncques (19 August 1889 – 6 April 1979) was a French footballer who played as a defender for Olympique Lillois and the French national team in the early 1910s.

== Early life ==
Jean Degouve de Nuncques was born on 19 August 1889 in Bléharies, a village in the border of northern France and Belgium, as the son of a bourgeois family from Arras that included the renowned Belgian painter William Degouve de Nuncques; his father, however, was French, who had emigrated to escape the Prussian occupation. Later, the family returned to France, settling in Arras, where Jean began playing football at the RC Arras in 1903, aged 14.

== Playing career ==
=== Club career ===
In 1909, Degouve moved to Lille to complete his law studies, and whilst there, he joined the ranks of Olympique Lillois, where he established himself as a full-back due to his height of 1.80 meters, well over the average of those times, being often described as a "colossus" by the press. He was noted for both his power and brutality on the pitch.

Together with Albert Eloy, Paul Voyeux, and Alphonse Six, he was a member of the OL team that won back-to-back USFSA Northern Championships in 1913 and 1914, winning the former with a record of 13 wins and only one defeat. On 5 April 1914, he started in the final of the USFSA National Championship, scoring twice to help his side to a 3–0 win over Olympique de Cette; the local press stated that he often neglected his defensive duties to "give himself the inglorious pleasure of rudely sending his southern opponent to the ground".

Three weeks later, on 26 April, he started in the final of the 1914 Trophée de France at the Charentonneau, where his "play was perfectly correct" in a 4–1 win over VGA Médoc. The following day, the journalists of the French newspaper L'Auto (currently known as L'Équipe) stated that "he did not make the slightest mistake of brutality and regained the popularity with the Parisian public".

=== International career ===
On 9 March 1913, the 23-year-old Degouve made his international debut for France in a friendly against Switzerland in Geneva, where he played alongside three other OL players in a 4–1 win; the only Swiss goal was scored due to a hesitation from Degouve. This happened because several Parisian players had withdrawn from the match at the last minute (there was no contractual obligation at the time), with OL's president Henri Jooris then helping the selection committee patch up the team by convincing the OL players to travel to Geneva in exchange for a bonus, which turned out to be two bottles of champagne. The following day, the journalists of L'Auto stated that he "scared" the Swiss attackers, as he was a very physical player who often shoulder-charged the ball carrier at full speed, who were not used to it. He earned his second and final cap on 8 February 1914, in a friendly against Luxembourg, where he teamed up with Lucien Gamblin at the back in a shocking 5–4 loss, partly because of Degouve, who conceded two penalties, both for charging Jean Massard.

On 1 November 1913, Degouve played for the so-called Lions des Flandres, a regional scratch team representing Northern France, in a friendly against English Wanderers, which ended in a 1–4 loss.

== Military career ==
During the First World War, Degouve was incorporated into the 1st section of military nurses, but due to having a certificate of competence to drive motor vehicles, he was soon moved the 1st squadron of a military crew train, attached to the 5th Army, where he first drove military ambulances, but later applied to become a pilot. In September 1915, at Le Crotoy, his left arm was seriously injured while he was maneuvering a propeller to start the airplane engine, so much so that it had to be amputated.

== Later life and death ==
In 1957, Degouve became the head of the Federal Commission of Social Affairs, a position that he held for 12 years, until 1969. He died in April 1979, aged 89.

== Honours ==
Olympique Lillois

- USFSA Football Northern Championship
  - Champions (2): 1913 and 1914
- USFSA Football Championship:
  - Champion (1): 1914
- Trophée de France:
  - Champion (1): 1914
