= Charles Montagne =

French footballer (1889–1940)

Personal information
- Full name: Charles Achilles Joseph Montagne
- Date of birth: 17 March 1889
- Place of birth: Roubaix, France
- Date of death: 22 May 1940 (aged 51)
- Place of death: Bruay-sur-l'Escaut, France
- Position: Midfielder

Senior career*
Years	Team	Apps	(Gls)
1909–1920	Olympique Lillois		

International career
1913–1920	France	3	(1)
1913	Northern France	1	(0)
- * Club domestic league appearances and goals

Charles Achilles Joseph Montagne (17 March 1889 – 22 May 1940) was a French footballer who played as a midfielder for Olympique Lillois and the French national team in the 1910s.

== Club career ==
Born in Roubaix on 17 March 1889, Montagne began his football career at Olympique Lillois in 1909, aged 20. Together with Paul Voyeux, Paul Chandelier, and Alphonse Six, Montagne helped OL win back-to-back USFSA Northern Championships in 1913 and 1914, winning the former with a record of 13 wins and only one defeat. On 5 April 1914, he started in the final of the 1914 USFSA Football Championship, helping his side to a 3–0 win over Olympique de Cette. Three weeks later, on 26 April, he started in the final of the Trophée de France at the Charentonneau, helping his side to a 4–1 win over VGA Médoc.

== International career ==
On 9 March 1913, Montagne made his international debut in a friendly match against Switzerland in Geneva, scoring once to help his side to a 4–1 win. In his second appearance in the following month, Montagne helped France to an 8–0 win over Luxembourg.

On 1 November 1913, Montagne played for the so-called Lions des Flandres, a regional scratch team representing Northern France, in a friendly against the English Wanderers in Paris, which ended in a 4–1 loss.

Montagne had to wait seven years to receive his third and last cap for France, in a friendly against Belgium at the Parc des Princes on 28 March 1920, helping his side to a 2–1 win.

== Later life and death ==
During the First World War, Montagne was a quartermaster sergeant of the 42nd artillery. After the War, he became an industrial in Lille.

Montagne died in Bruay-sur-l'Escaut on 22 May 1940, at the age of 51.

== Career statistics ==
France score listed first, score column indicates score after each Montagne goal.

List of international goals scored by Charles Montagne
No.	Date	Venue	Opponent	Score	Result	Competition
1	9 March 1913	Charmilles Stadium, Geneva, Switzerland	Switzerland	1–1	4–1	Friendly match

== Honours ==
Olympique Lillois

- USFSA Football Northern Championship: 1911, 1913, 1914
- USFSA Football Championship: 1914
- Trophée de France: 1914
