= Albert Eloy (footballer, born 1892) =

French footballer

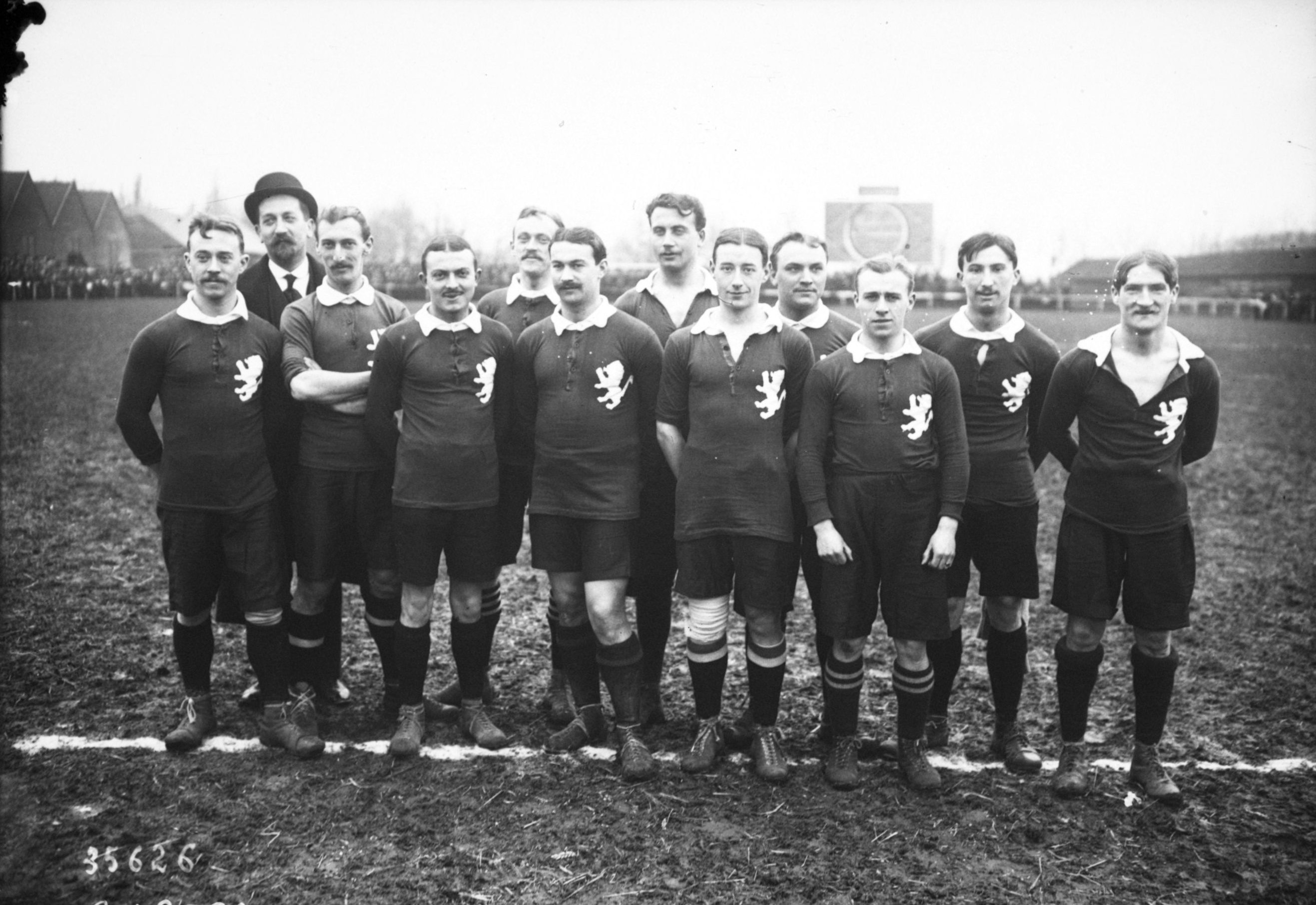
- Eloy (sixth, from the left) on 4 January 1914.

Personal information
- Date of birth: 17 April 1892
- Place of birth: Carnin, Nord, France
- Date of death: 7 January 1947 (aged 54)
- Place of death: Anor, France
- Height: 1.81 m (5 ft 11 in)
- Position: Forward

Senior career*
Years	Team	Apps	(Gls)
1908–1919	Olympique Lillois		

International career
1911–1912	France (unofficial)	3	(2)
1913–1914	France	2	(2)
1914	Northern France	+1	(1)
- * Club domestic league appearances and goals

Albert Eloy (17 April 1892 – 7 January 1947) was a French footballer who played as a forward for Olympique Lillois and the French national team in the 1910s.

== Playing career ==
=== Club career ===
Albert Eloy was born in Carnin, Nord, on 17 April 1892, and due to his great size of 1.81 meters, he quickly stood out as a great center-forward, becoming a French school champion with the Faidherbe high school. He then joined the ranks of Olympique Lillois in 1908, aged 16. On 19 February 1911, Eloy scored the opening goal in an eventual 3–0 win over RC Roubaix, thus contributing decisively in helping the club clinch the 1911 USFSA Northern Championship, which was the very first title in the club's history.

Together with Paul Voyeux, Paul Chandelier, and Alphonse Six, Eloy helped OL win back-to-back USFSA Northern Championships in 1913 and 1914, winning the former with a record of 13 wins and only one defeat. On 5 April 1914, he started in the final of the 1914 USFSA Football Championship, scoring twice to help his side to a 3–0 win over Olympique de Cette.

Two weeks later, on 19 April, Eloy started in the semifinal of the 1914 Trophée de France in Roubaix, scoring the opening goal in an eventual 4–1 win over FEC Levallois, and in the following week, on 26 April, he started in the final of the Trophée de France at the Charentonneau, helping his side to a 4–1 win over.

=== International career ===
On 23 March 1911, just a month after helping Lillois win its first-ever title, the USFSA selected the 19-year-old Eloy to play an unofficial match between UIAFA's France and AFA's England at the Parc de Princes; he scored his side's only goal in a 1–3 loss. On 1 January 1912, he played another match against the AFA, this time in London, and he again scored the only goal for France (1–7). He was also a member of the French squad that participated in the 1911 UIAFA European Football Tournament at Roubaix, an unofficial European Championship organized by UIAFA, in which France was knocked out in the semifinals by Bohemia (1–4).

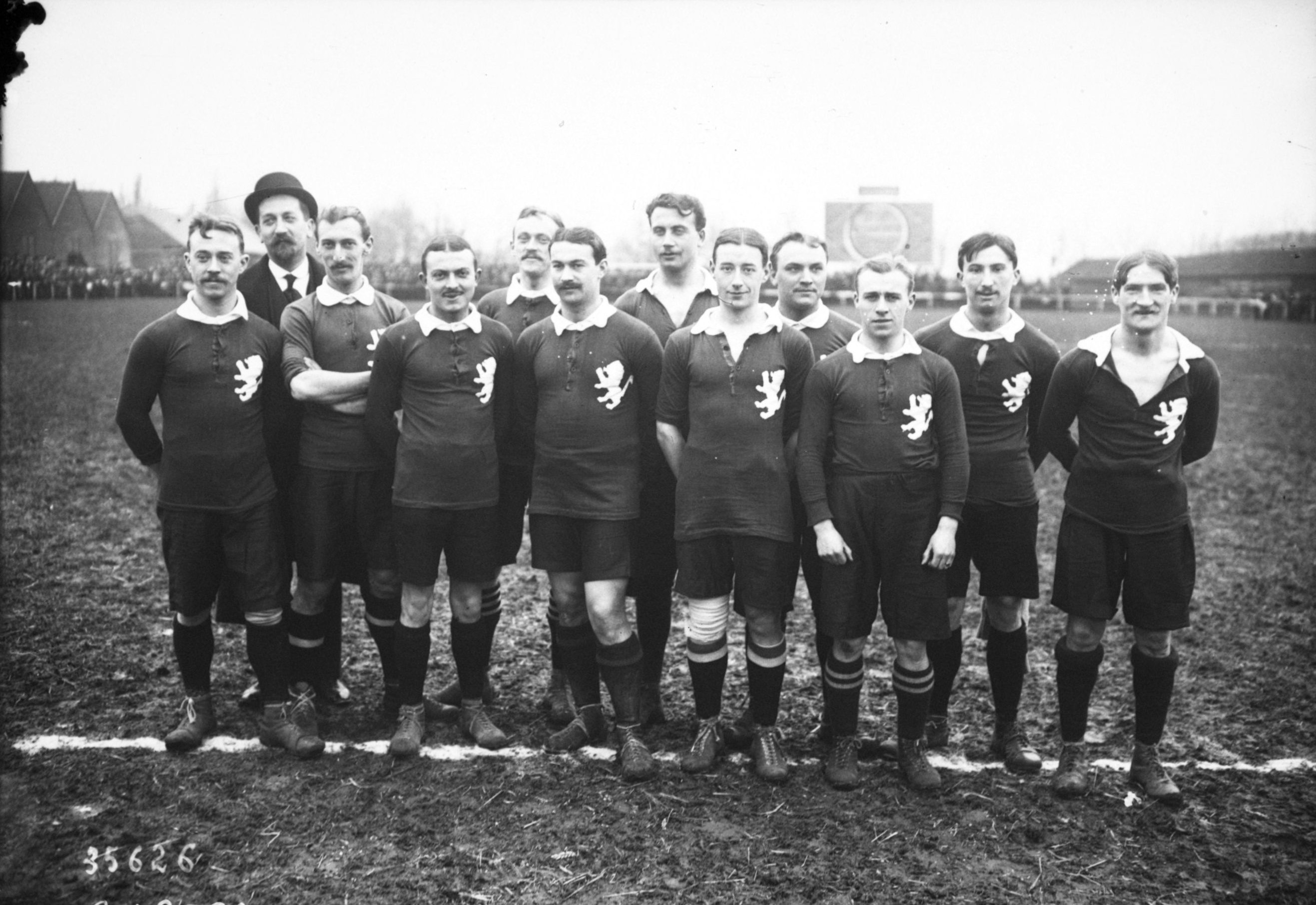
Eloy (sixth, from the left) with the Lions of Flanders selection on 4 January 1914.

When the USFSA joined the CFI in 1913, Eloy finally became eligible to play for the France national team, making his debut on 9 March, in a friendly match against Switzerland at Geneva, scoring twice to help his side to a 4–1 win. On 4 January 1914, Eloy played for the so-called Lions des Flandres, a regional scratch team representing Northern France, in a friendly against the Paris football team; he scored the opening goal in an eventual 3–1 win. This performance earned him his second selection for the national team, in a friendly against Belgium, but he remained an unused substitute.

Eloy finally earned his second and last international cap against Luxembourg on 8 February 1914, but failed to score as France surprisingly lost 4–5.

== Later life ==
During the First World War, Eloy and his OL teammate Chandelier remained in their capacity as medical students, working as nurses at the Saint-Sauveur hospital in Lille, where they devoted themselves to relieving the suffering of their unfortunate fellow citizens under the German boot. His father, however, was assassinated by the Germans in Provins, near Lille, where he was a teacher.

Eloy retired from playing in 1919. He then settled as a military doctor in Anor, and in that same year, he founded the town's football club with the help of the few enthusiasts of the village, such as Lucien Bottiau, Jean Troisfontaine, Raoul Martin, André Fillette, and the Franco-Argentine Paul Million, a high-class goalkeeper. He later settled in Aisne.

== Death ==
Eloy died in Anor on 7 January 1947, at the age of 54.

== Career statistics ==
France score listed first, score column indicates score after each Eloy goal.

List of international goals scored by Albert Eloy
No.	Date	Venue	Opponent	Score	Result	Competition
1	9 March 1913	Charmilles Stadium, Geneva, Switzerland	Switzerland	2–1	4–1	Friendly match
2	9 March 1913	Charmilles Stadium, Geneva, Switzerland	Switzerland	4–1	4–1	Friendly match

== Honours ==
Olympique Lillois

- USFSA Football Northern Championship
  - Champions (3): 1911, 1913, and 1914
- USFSA Football Championship:
  - Champion (1): 1914
- Trophée de France:
  - Champion (1): 1914
