= Paul Chandelier =

French footballer

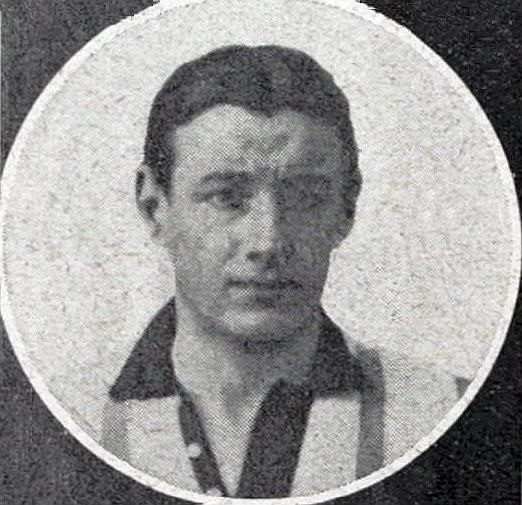
- Chandelier in 1914.

Personal information
- Full name: Paul Jules Louis Chandelier
- Date of birth: 23 January 1892
- Place of birth: Hergnies, Nord, France
- Date of death: 28 September 1983 (aged 91)
- Place of death: Lille, France
- Position: Forward

Senior career*
| Years | Team | Apps | (Gls) |
| 1911–1914 | Olympique Lillois | | |

International career
| 1911 | France (unofficial) | 2 | (1) |
| 1913–1914 | France | 3 | (0) |
| 1914 | Northern France | +1 | (1) |
- * Club domestic league appearances and goals

Paul Jules Louis Chandelier (23 January 1892 – 28 September 1983) was a French footballer who played as a forward for Olympique Lillois and the French national team between 1912 and 1914.

== Playing career ==
=== Club career ===
Born in Hergnies, Nord, on 23 January 1892, Chandelier began his career at Olympique Lillois at least since 1911, aged 19. On 19 February 1911, OL defeated RC Roubaix 3–0 to clinch the 1911 USFSA Northern Championship, which was the very first title in the club's history, thus finally putting an end to the invincibility of Roubaix and US Tourquennoise.

Together with Albert Eloy, Paul Voyeux, and Alphonse Six, Chandelier was a member of the OL team that won back-to-back USFSA Northern Championships in 1913 and 1914, winning the former with a record of 13 wins and only one defeat. On 5 April 1914, Chandelier started in the final of the USFSA National Championship, scoring twice to help his side to a 3–0 win over Olympique de Cette. Two weeks later, on 19 April, he started in the semifinal of the 1914 Trophée de France in Roubaix, scoring a brace to help his side to a 4–1 win over FEC Levallois. In the final at the Charentonneau on 26 April, "Chandelier's virtuosity allows the Northerners to show their superiority", scoring the opening goal as his side claimed a 4–1 win over VGA Médoc.

=== International career ===
On 23 March 1911, shortly after helping Lillois win its first-ever title, the USFSA selected the 19-year-old Chandelier to play an unofficial match between UIAFA's France and AFA's England at the Parc de Princes, which ended in a 1–3 loss. He was then a member of the French squad that participated in the 1911 UIAFA European Football Tournament at Roubaix, an unofficial European Championship organized by UIAFA, in which France was knocked out in the semifinals by Bohemia, in which he scored a consolation goal with a beautiful shot from 25 meters in an eventual 1–4 loss.

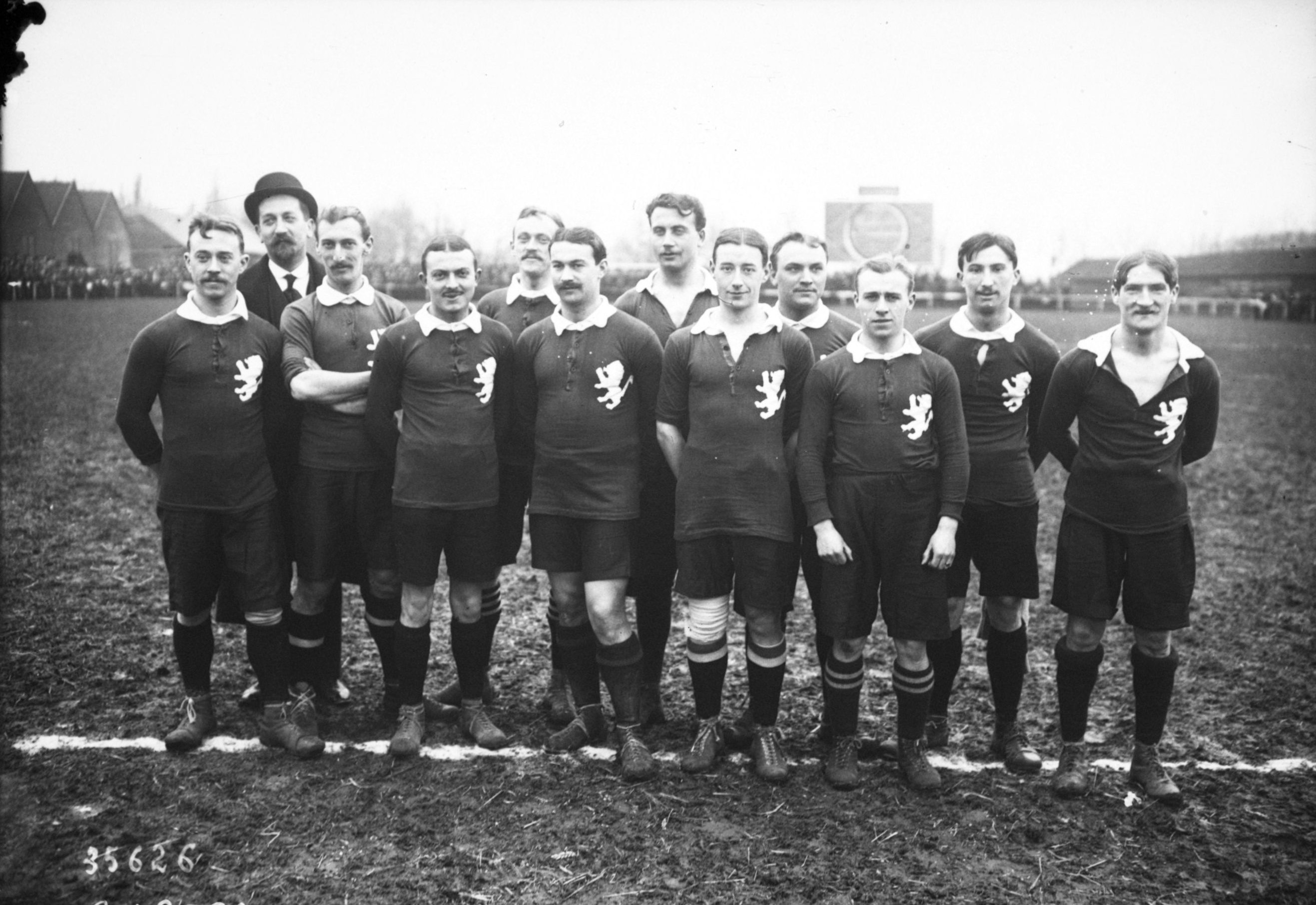
Chandelier (fifth, from the right) with the Lions of Flanders selection on 4 January 1914.

When the USFSA joined the CFI in 1913, Chandelier finally became eligible to play for the French national team, making his debut on 9 March, in a friendly match against Switzerland at Geneva, scoring twice to help his side to a 4–1 win. On 4 January 1914, Chandelier played for the so-called Lions des Flandres, a regional scratch team representing Northern France, in a friendly against the Paris football team; he scored the opening goal in an eventual 3–1 win. He earned a further two caps in 1914, against Belgium and Italy.

== Later life and death ==
During the First World War, Chandelier and his OL teammate Eloy remained in their capacity as medical students, working as nurses at the Saint-Sauveur hospital in Lille, where they devoted themselves to relieving the suffering of their unfortunate fellow citizens under the German boot. After the War, Chandelier worked as the head of the laboratory at the Faculty of Medicine of Lille.

Chandelier died in Lille on 28 September 1983, at the age of 91.

== Honours ==
Olympique Lillois

- USFSA Football Northern Championship
  - Champions (2): 1913, and 1914
- USFSA Football Championship:
  - Champion (1): 1914
- Trophée de France:
  - Champion (1): 1914
