= Charles Bunyan =

Charles Bunyan may refer to:

- Charles Bunyan Sr. (1869–1922), English football player and manager
- Charles Bunyan Jr. (1892–1975), English football player
