= Jooris =

Jooris is a surname. Notable people with the surname include:

- Henri Jooris (1879–1940), French businessman, industrialist, and sports manager
  - Stade Henri-Jooris
- Josh Jooris (born 1990), Canadian professional ice hockey centre
- Mark Jooris (born 1964), Canadian ice hockey coach and former professional player
- Roland Jooris (born 1936), Belgian poet and writer on contemporary art

== See also ==
- Jooris van der Straeten (1552–1577), Flemish portrait and history painter
