= Elzo (surname) =

Elzo is a Spanish surname. Notable people with the surname include:

- Castor Elzo (1917–1989), Spanish footballer
- Francisco Elzo (1908–?), Spanish footballer
- Francisco Javier Elzo (born 1942), Spanish social researcher and emeritus professor of Sociology

== See also ==
- Elzo (born 1961), Brazilian retired footballer
