= Degouve de Nuncques =

Degouve de Nuncques is a French surname. Notable people with the surname include:

- Louis François Joseph Degouve de Nuncques (1783–1833), French politician;
  - Édouard Degouve de Nuncques (1810–1878), French journalist, senior civil servant, and the son of the above
- William Degouve de Nuncques (1867–1935), Belgian painter and the great-nephew of the above
- Jean Degouve de Nuncques (1889–1979), French footballer

== See also ==
- Stade Degouve-Brabant
