= Iris Club lillois =

French football club

- Founded: 1898
- Dissolved: 1932

Iris Club lillois was an all-sports club based in Lille, France, which was founded in 1898. The club won two USFSA North Championships in 1899 and 1901. The football section of the Iris Club ceased to exist in 1941, when it merged with Olympique Lille to form Olympique Iris Club Lillois which later became Lille OSC. Apart from the football section, the club includes sports sections dedicated to tennis, rugby, and even field hockey, the latter two being founded in 1924.

== History ==
=== First titles ===
Iris Club lillois (ICL) was founded on 10 October 1898 when André Nicodème declared the association in the Prefecture. The colors of the club were blood red and gold (Sang et or). ICL then joined the Union des Sociétés Françaises de Sports Athlétiques (USFSA), the largest French sports association of the time. The football section quickly made a name for itself by winning the USFSA Northern Regional Championships, which at the time had 5 teams (Tourcoing, Calais, Roubaix, Saint-Omer, and Lille). This first title was obtained within the very first year of their foundation and in a rather comfortable fashion with 8 victories in 8 matches.

This gave ICL the honor of playing in the semifinal of the 1899 French championship, which was the first edition to be open to clubs beyond the Paris region. Thus on 19 February 1899 at the Parc des Princes, the Iris club played in the very first major French championship match against Havre Athletic Club in order to determine which "provincial" club would face the best Parisian club. However, due to a grotesque organizational problem, including no ball at kickoff, the match only lasted 45 minutes because of the hockey players who were playing right after them. The game was thus postponed for 25 March, now in Amiens, but ICL did not come because a flu epidemic of influenza struck the players, so Le Havre reached the final by default.

In 1901, the ICL won the Nord Championship for the second time to advance to the final round of the USFSA national championship, but once again Le Havre AC blocked its path to the final. By the First World War, the Iris Club in northern France was no longer able to assert itself against the stronger competitors, in particular Racing Roubaix, the US Tourquennoise, who won all editions of the Normandy Championship as well as six USFSA French Championships between 1902 and 1910.

=== Merger with Olympique Lillois ===
The Iris Club Lille then merged with Stade Lille, thus becoming the Iris-Stade Lille. In 1907, the Iris club was absorbed by the local rival Olympique Lillois, founded in 1902, so Iris then plays under the colors of Olympique Lille. André Nicodème, president of the Iris Club, becomes the first president of Olympique Lille. He was replaced five years later by André Billy.

On 16 April, several sections regained their independence, including the hockey section which became the Lille Hockey Club, and the rugby section which became the Lille Rugby Club, but regrettably, the main efforts of the club's rugby players were concentrated on the football section, who founded the Iris Club of Lambersart in the 1920s. In the 1928–29 season, a club named Rugby Amateur Club Lillois playing at the Canon d'or in Lambersart reached the semifinals in the 3rd series French championship. The head office is the Taverne Excelsior, which is owned by Henri Jooris, president of Olympique Lille. Throughout the Bois de la Deûle area, near the racecourse, the main training and playing rugby fields are grouped in the territory of Lille or that of Lambersart.

=== Struggles and disappearance ===
In the 1920s and 1930s, especially after the introduction of professional operations in the 1932–33 season, the ICL was only number three in its own city behind Olympique and SC Fives. In 1929, the club made its first appearance in the first division of the Championnat Nord for the first time after World War I, but after three seasons in the mid-table, Ligue 1 was founded. ICL only occasionally attracted national attention in the national cup competition, the Coupe de France, where they contested the fourth round seven times in a row from 1928–29 to 1934–35. In the 1930–31 season, after victories over Red Star Strasbourg and FC Sète, he made it into the round of 16, and in the following year later, this time, against CA Paris and again FC Sète (among others) even to the quarterfinals, which they lost 1–3 to OGC Nice.

Coat of arms of Lille OSC (1950s) with iris.

During the occupation of northern France in World War II, there was a concentration of strength among Lille's football clubs. Initially, on 25 May 1941, the Iris Club merged with Olympique Lille, which had stopped playing football for two years due to the outbreak of the War. The club adopted the name OIC Lille and played two seasons in the top flight during the war. In September 1944, OIC Lille merged with SC Fives to form Lille OSC, which had a stylized iris (iris or fleur-de-lys) in its coat of arms until the 1970s. However, the merger did not go smoothly and some of the members of the Iris Club Lillois, the oldest of the three merged clubs, did not follow this path and remained in neighboring Lambersart and its rugby section played at the Stade de la Laiterie.

The rugby section of the Iris Club returned to Lille in 1971, playing at the Stade Grimonprez (named in tribute to the captain of the French hockey team killed in the war, which stands for 1,200 seated spectators, and training grounds for football, rugby, handball, hockey, tennis, among others. make this place a site appreciated by high-level athletes, amateur athletes, and the sporting public.

== Honours ==
USFSA North Championship in 1899 and 1901.

== Notable figures ==
- At the Iris Club Lillois
  - Jean Baratte, player until 1941
  - André Cheuva, player 1926 to 1928
- At the Iris Club de Lambersart
  - Amandine Henry, youth player until 2004
  - Florent Ibengé 1974 to 1979 (as a teenager), 1980 to 1982
  - Jean Lechantre, coach in the 1960s
  - Didier Six, a youth player in the 1960s
  - Boleslaw Tempowski, coach in the 1960s
