= Paul Voyeux =

French footballer

Personal information
- Date of birth: 11 April 1884
- Place of birth: Valenciennes, France
- Date of death: 1 May 1968 (aged 84)
- Place of death: Clichy, France
- Position: Forward

Senior career*
Years	Team	Apps	(Gls)
1908–1919	Olympique Lillois		

International career
1911–1912	France (unofficial)	3	(0)
1913	France	1	(0)
- * Club domestic league appearances and goals

Paul Voyeux (11 April 1884 – 1 May 1968) was a French footballer who played as a forward for Olympique Lillois and the France national team between 1912 and 1914.

== Playing career ==
=== Club career ===
Paul Voyeux was born in Valenciennes, Nord, on 11 April 1884, and he joined Olympique Lillois by 1911. On 19 February 1911, OL defeated RC Roubaix 3–0 to clinch the 1911 USFSA Northern Championship, which was the very first title in the club's history, thus finally putting an end to the invincibility of Roubaix and US Tourquennoise.

Due to his already advanced age, Voyeux quickly established himself as the club's captain, and he then led an OL team with Albert Eloy, Paul Chandelier, and Alphonse Six to back-to-back USFSA Northern Championships in 1913 and 1914, winning the former with a record of 13 wins and only one defeat. On 5 April 1914, he started in the final of the USFSA National Championship, scoring twice to help his side to a 3–0 win over Olympique de Cette.

=== International career ===
In May 1911, three months after helping Lillois win its first-ever title, the USFSA selected Voyeux as a member of the French squad that participated in the 1911 UIAFA European Football Tournament at Roubaix, an unofficial European Championship organized by UIAFA, in which France was knocked out in the semifinals by Bohemia (1–4). He played his second match for UIAFA's France on 1 January 1912, in a friendly match against AFA's England in London, which ended in a 7–1 loss, and then played his third and last match in the following month, on 20 February, against Catalonia, scoring once and assisting another to help his side to a 7–0 victory.

When the USFSA joined the CFI in 1913, Voyeux finally became eligible to play for the France national team, earning his first (and only) international cap against Luxembourg on 20 April 1913, helping his side to an 8–0 win.

== Later life and death ==
During World War I, Voyeux served as a quartermaster interpreter with the British Army. After the War, he became the director of a counter for seeds and oilseed products in Paris.

Voyeux died in Clichy, Hauts-de-Seine on 1 May 1968, at the age of 84.

== Honours ==
Olympique Lillois

- USFSA Football Northern Championship
  - Champions (2): 1913, and 1914
- USFSA Football Championship:
  - Champion (1): 1914
