= Florent Ibengé =

Congolese football manager (born 1961)

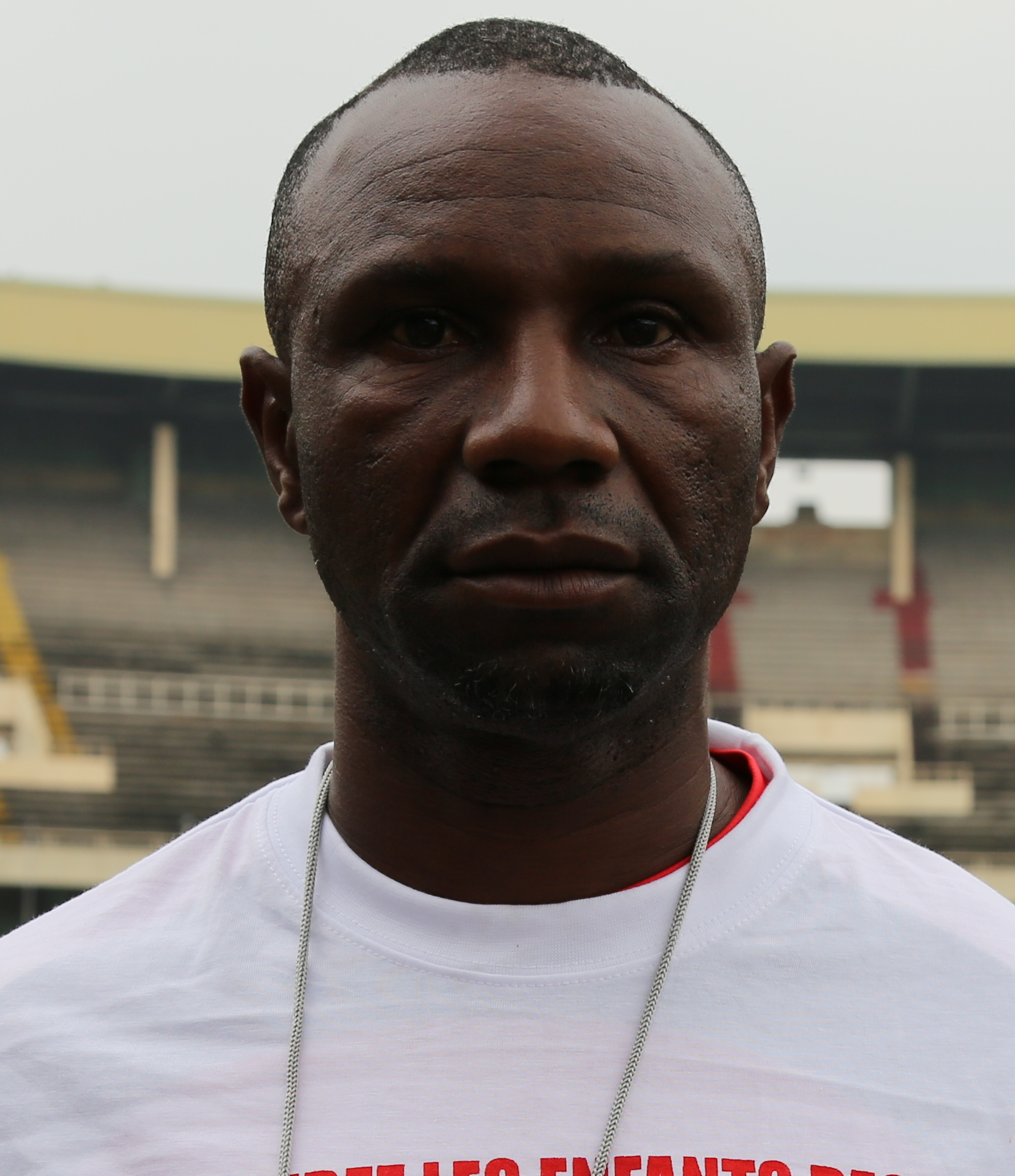
- Florent Ibengé in 2016

Personal information
- Full name: Jean-Florent Ikwange Ibengé
- Date of birth: 4 December 1961 (age 64)
- Place of birth: Léopoldville, Republic of the Congo
- Height: 1.87 m (6 ft 2 in)
- Position: Centre-back

Team information
- Current team: Azam (head coach)

Senior career*
Years	Team	Apps	(Gls)
1978–1979	Iris Club lillois		
1979–1980	Tennis Borussia Berlin		
1980–1983	Iris Club lillois		
1983–1985	OS Fives		
1985–1993	Excelsior Roubaix		
1993–1998	US Boulogne		
1998–2003	ES Wasquehal		

Managerial career
- 2008–2010: ES Wasquehal
- 2010–2011: SC Douai
- 2012: Shanghai Shenhua
- 2014–2019: DR Congo
- 2014–2021: Vita Club
- 2021–2022: RS Berkane
- 2022–2025: Al-Hilal Club
- 2025–: Azam
Medal record
Men's football
Representing DR Congo (as manager)
Africa Cup of Nations
Bronze medal – third place	2015
- * Club domestic league appearances and goals

Jean-Florent Ikwange Ibengé (born 4 December 1961) is a Congolese football coach and former player who is the head coach of Tanzanian club Azam.

== Early and personal life ==
He was born in Léopoldville on 4 December 1961.

== Playing career ==
Ibengé played as a centre-back for Iris Club lillois, Tennis Borussia Berlin, OS Fives, Excelsior Roubaix, US Boulogne and ES Wasquehal.

== Coaching career ==
He spent his early coaching career in France, managing ES Wasquehal and SC Douai.

He was manager of Chinese club Shanghai Shenhua from April to May 2012, and of Congolese team Vita Club from February 2014.

He became manager of the DR Congo national team in August 2014, combining this role with his job at Vita Club.

He led DR Congo to the 2016 African Nations Championship title in February 2016.

In March 2017, he announced that he intended to step down as national team manager in 2018. He resigned in August 2019. After that, he returned to AS Vita Club.

In July 2021 he became manager of Moroccan club RS Berkane. In June 2022 he became manager of Sudanese club Al-Hilal Club.

In November 2022, Ibenge won the Sudan Cup after Al-Hilal defeated Al Ahli Khartoum in the final winning via a 4–3 penalty shoot-out after the match had ended in a goalless draw after extra time.

Following the start of the 2023 Sudan conflict, Ibengé voiced his plans to set up a base camp for Al-Hilal players in Cairo, Egypt, and expressed hopes that the team would continue to play in the Arab Club Champions Cup. In April 2023, Ibengé and his family fled to France via Djibouti.

In July 2025 he became head coach of Tanzanian club Azam.

== Honours ==
DR Congo

- African Nations Championship: 2016
- African Cup of Nations third place: 2015

AS Vita Club

- Linafoot: 2014–15, 2017–18, 2020–21
- DR Congo Super Cup: 2015
- CAF Champions League runner-up: 2014
- CAF Confederation Cup runner-up: 2018

RS Berkane

- Moroccan Throne Cup: 2020–21
- CAF Confederation Cup: 2021–22

Al-Hilal

- Sudan Cup: 2021–22
