= Francisco Elzo =

Spanish footballer and manager

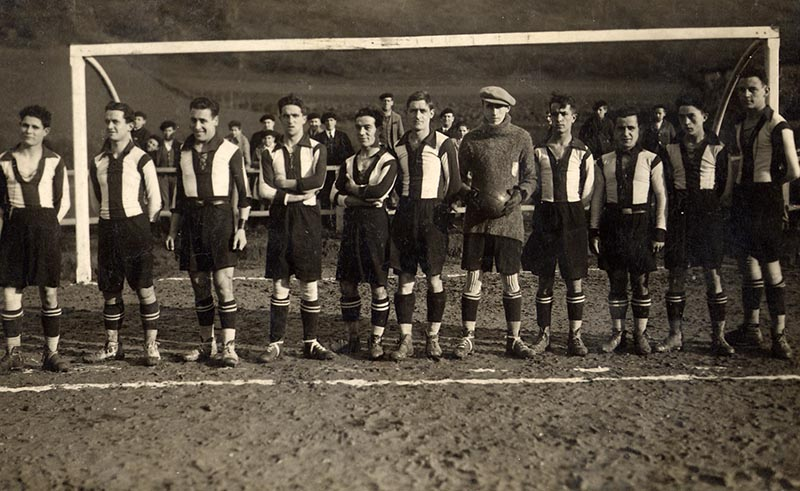
- Elzo (holding the ball) in 1927–28

Personal information
- Full name: Francisco Elzo Urrestarazu
- Date of birth: 4 October 1908
- Place of birth: Beasain, Gipuzkoa, Spain
- Date of death: Unknown
- Position: Goalkeeper

Senior career*
Years	Team	Apps	(Gls)
1922–1929	Beasain SA		
1929–1932	Real Sociedad		
1932–1936	Real Murcia		
1939–1941	Beasain FC		

Managerial career
- 1939–1942: Beasain FC
- 1946–1949: Beasain FC
- * Club domestic league appearances and goals

Francisco Elzo Urrestarazu, also known as Paco Elzo (4 October 1908 – unknown), was a Spanish footballer who played as a Goalkeeper for Real Sociedad and Real Murcia in the 1930s. He is widely regarded as one of the most important figures in the amateur beginnings of football in Beasain, being the fundamental head behind the reactivation of SD Beasain in 1939, which he served as goalkeeper, coach, and president.

He is the father of sociologist Javier Elzo.

== Playing career ==
=== Beasain SA ===
Born in the Gipuzkoan town of Beasain on 4 October 1908, Elzo began his football career at his hometown club Beasain SA in 1922, aged only 14, remaining there for seven years, until 1929. Upon being registered in the Gipuzkoa Football Federation, Beasain made its official competitive debut in October 1922, in the Serie C of the Gipuzkoa Championship. In March 1924, Elzo started for Beasain in a friendly match against Real Sociedad's reserve team at Atotxa, and although they lost heavily (8–1), the team was well received, as reflected in the press of the time, who praised Beasain's goalkeeper.

Together with Albert Eloy, Domingo Arrillaga, and Belauste, Elzo was a member of the Beasain team that won back-to-back Tolosa District championships in Serie C in 1926 and 1927, thus qualifying to the promotion phase, which they won in 1927. In their first season in the Serie B of the Gipuzkoa Championship, Beasain won the Vergara District championship, and in the subsequent promotion phase, the club claimed a 3–2 win over CD Logroñés, which was labeled by the local press of the time as the most important victory in the club's history, even though they did not achieve promotion to Serie A.

=== Sociedad and Murcia ===
In the 1928–29 season, the former captain of Real Zaragoza, Roman Unanua, signed for Beasain as a player-coach, but at the end of that season, in 1929, Elzo and striker Belauste left the club to join Real Sociedad. In doing so, Elzo became the first player from the Goierri region to play for Real Sociedad. Elzo made his debut for the first team of Real Sociedad on 16 November 1930, in a Gipuzkoa Championship match against Euzkalduna, helping his side to a 7–0 win. In total, he played eight official matches for Sociedad, including one in regional championships, two in the Copa del Rey, and five in La Liga, winning four and losing four. In 1932, the 24-year-old Elzo joined Real Murcia, then in the Segunda División, for whom he played until the outbreak of the Spanish Civil War, after which he returned to his hometown of Beasain.

On 21 February 1938, Elzo, described as a 29-year-old single requeté, was discharged from Tercio de Oriamendi because he had become a "subject to JONS' malice".

=== Beasain FC ===
Knowing that football championships would return, Elzo was given the task of putting together a team with the best local players available to compete in the Second Division championship that the Guipuzcoan Federation was preparing. Despite having an offer to return to Murcia, Elzo decided to accept Beasain's challenge instead, creating a commission presided by himself that was in charge of gathering a group of players who had belonged to the local club Tercio de Oriamendi, to whom were added, with the logical consent of the authorities, others from the concentration camps in a clear attempt to bring football back to the Beasain as it had been before the war. Chaired by Elzo himself, the club was thus reactivated at the end of 1939 as Beasain Fútbol Club, and was then registered with the Guipuzcoan Federation.

In addition to being president, Elzo was also the team's coach and goalkeeper, and under his leadership, Beasain FC won the Tolosa District tournament for second-tier clubs in March 1940, and then finally achieved promoted to the First Regional Category, where it made its debut in September 1940. Elzo quickly became the alma mater of football in Beasain, and he even had songs celebrating his great performances, being the focus of the popular chorus of the club's fans at the Senpere field, the home stadium of Beasain FC. At some point in the early 1940, he was the subject of a tribute match in Senpere against Mondragón, champion of another district, which ended in a 10–1 victory for Beasain.

== Managerial career ==
Due to Law, the club had to adopt its current name of Sociedad Deportiva Beasain in 1940, and since the club had been deregistered from the Registry of Associations at the start of the war, Elzo had to legalize the club's situation again, a process that was extended until after the end of the 1941–42 season. In the summer of 1941, Elzo attempted to activate the club's youth academy by organizing a championship for non-federated players and teams from other towns. In the summer of 1942, Elzo managed to sign good players, such as including Ángel Ortega and Santos Eizaguirre of Real Sociedad, with the latter replacing Elzo as the club's goalkeeper, but he was still the coach, and in that season (1941–42), Beasain FC finished fourth in the Gipuzkoa Championship, and won the Tolosa district in the Copa Guipúzcoa, beating Tolosa CF 2–3 in the final at Berazubi. He was then replaced as coach by Antonio Lamy, and later replaced as president as well.

In 1946, Elzo returned as coach of the Beasain, which was now back in the second division of the Gipuzkoa Championship, and his impact was immediate as the club had an extraordinary start to the season with some memorable victories, but the on-field death of their player Mauricio Yarza broke the team's rhythm and they finished fourth. In the following season, the club achieved historic victories, being the only team in the category to beat Touring on 14 December 1947, but finished 3rd place in a group with 12 teams. The following season was his last as coach, and Beasain finished sixth, which was enough to achieve promotion to the top division of regional football because the Guipuzcoan Federation had announced that the top six teams in each group would form part of a new category from 1949 under the name of Regional Preferente, which was made up of the most distinguished clubs from Gipuzkoa and La Rioja. This was also the first season in which players wore their numbers on their shirts.
