= Bob Fisher (football manager) =

English association football player

Robert Fisher was an English professional football manager who coached French team Olympique Lillois between 1934 and 1935.
