= Charles Bunyan Jr. =

English footballer and manager (1893–1975)

Charles Bunyan
Personal information
- Full name: Charles Cyril Bunyan
- Date of birth: 22 November 1892
- Place of birth: England
- Date of death: 1975 (aged 82–83)
- Position: Midfielder

Senior career*
Years	Team	Apps	(Gls)
1911–1920	Racing Club de Bruxelles	55	(12)
1920–1922	Chelsea		

Managerial career
- 1922–1925: Anderlecht
- * Club domestic league appearances and goals

Charles Cyril Bunyan Jr. (22 November 1892 – 1975) was an English professional football player and manager. During his time in Belgium, he was known as Cyrille Bunyan.

== Playing career ==
Bunyan played in Belgium for Racing Club de Bruxelles (where he scored 12 goals in 55 games, and in England for Chelsea.

== Coaching career ==
Bunyan replaced his father as manager of Anderlecht in 1922, following the latter's death.

== Personal life ==
He was the son of Charles Bunyan Sr. and brother of Maurice Bunyan.
