= Anor =

- Commune
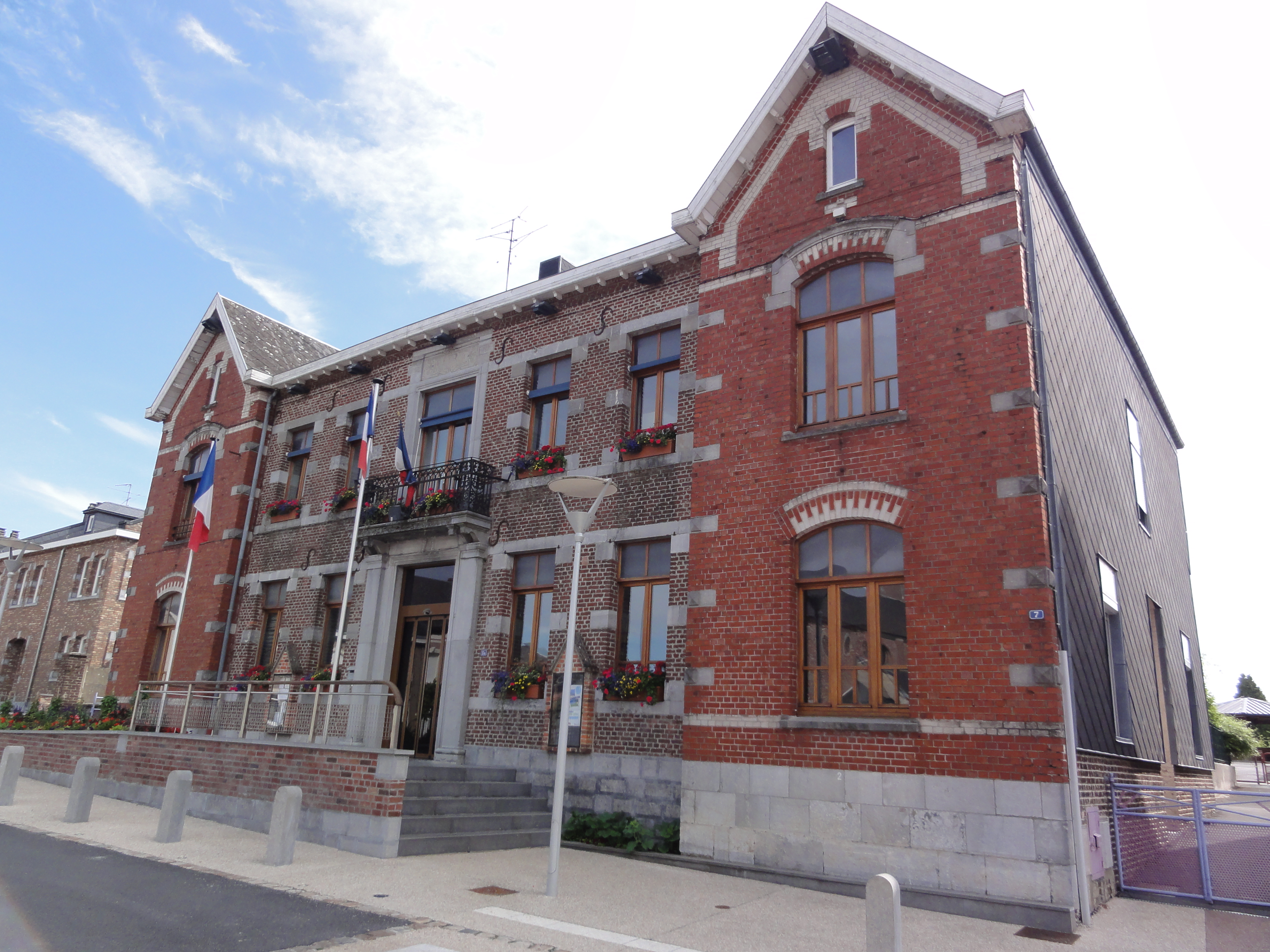
- The town hall in Anor

- Coat of arms
- Location of Anor
- Location within France Location within Hauts-de-France
- Coordinates: 49°59′24″N 4°05′57″E
- Country: France
- Region: Hauts-de-France
- Department: Nord
- Arrondissement: Avesnes-sur-Helpe
- Canton: Fourmies
- Intercommunality: Sud Avesnois

Government
  - Mayor (2020–2026): Jean-Luc Pérat
- Area^{1}: 22.24 km^{2} (8.59 sq mi)
- Elevation: 238 m (781 ft)
- Highest elevation: 271 m (889 ft)
- Lowest elevation: 200 m (660 ft)
- Population (2023): 3,099
  - Density: 139.3/km^{2} (360.9/sq mi)
- Time zone: UTC+01:00 (CET)
  - Summer (DST): UTC+02:00 (CEST)
- INSEE/Postal code: 59012 /59186
- ^{1} French Land Register data, which excludes lakes, ponds, glaciers > 1 km^{2} (0.386 sq mi or 247 acres) and river estuaries.

Anor (French pronunciation: [anɔʁ]) is a commune in the Nord department in northern France. It lies about forty kilometres (twenty-five miles) south-south-east of Maubeuge.

== Population ==
Historical population

Year	Pop.	±% p.a.
1793	1,552	—
1821	1,608	+0.13%
1846	2,965	+2.48%
1872	3,637	+0.79%
1901	4,610	+0.82%
1926	4,528	−0.07%
1946	3,300	−1.57%
1962	3,794	+0.88%
1968	3,622	−0.77%

Year	Pop.	±% p.a.
1975	3,373	−1.01%
1982	3,109	−1.16%
1990	3,099	−0.04%
1999	3,093	−0.02%
2007	3,231	+0.55%
2012	3,347	+0.71%
2017	3,220	−0.77%
2023	3,099	−0.64%

Source: EHESS and INSEE (1968-2023)

== Twin towns – sister cities ==
Anor is twinned with:

- Aken, Germany
- Gizałki, Poland
- Momignies, Belgium
- Příbram, Czech Republic

== Heraldry ==
Arms of Anor	The arms of Anor are blazoned : Vert billetty, a lion Or.

== See also ==
- Communes of the Nord department
