= Charles Bunyan Sr. =

English footballer and manager

Charles Bunyan
Personal information
- Full name: Charles Bunyan
- Date of birth: 1869
- Place of birth: Campton, England
- Date of death: 1922 (aged 52–53)
- Place of death: Ixelles, Belgium
- Position: Goalkeeper

Youth career
- Old Horns
- Spital Olympic

Senior career*
Years	Team	Apps	(Gls)
1886–1887	Chesterfield	?	(?)
1887–1889	Hyde	?	(?)
1889–1892	Derby County	9	(0)
1892–1894	Chesterfield Town	42	(0)
1893	→ Sheffield United (guest)	0	(0)
1894–1895	Derby County	0	(0)
1895–1896	Ilkeston Town	?	(?)
1896	Heanor Town	?	(?)
1896–1898	Walsall	44	(0)
1898–1899	New Brompton	24	(0)
1899–1902	Newcastle United	0	(0)

Managerial career
- 1909–1911: Racing Club de Bruxelles
- 1909–1911: Belgium (Assistant Manager)
- 1911–1912: Örgryte IS
- 1912: Sweden (Coach)
- 1912–1914: Standard Liège
- 1914: Belgium
- 1919–1922: Anderlecht (Coach)
- 1922: Anderlecht
- * Club domestic league appearances and goals

Charles Bunyan Sr. (1869–1922) was an English professional football player and manager active throughout Europe in the late-19th and early-20th centuries.

== Personal life ==
Bunyan was born in Campton. Bunyan had three sons – Charles Jr., Maurice and Ernie – two of whom became professional footballers.

== Career ==
=== Playing career ===
Bunyan played as a goalkeeper, and after playing with local sides Old Horns and Spital Olympic, Bunyan played with Chesterfield in 1886, before turning professional with Hyde a year later. He was in goal for Hyde when the club lost 26–0 to Preston North End in the FA Cup in October 1887, a score which remains a record in senior English football.

He played in the Football League with Derby County, Bunyan returned to Chesterfield in 1892. Bunyan was sacked by Chesterfield for a number of misdemeanours – both on and off the pitch – and he played with Ilkeston Town and Heanor Town before returning to League football with Walsall. He moved to New Brompton in 1898, where he was an ever-present for one season before moving on to Newcastle United. He also played as a 'guest' player for Sheffield United.

=== Coaching career ===
Bunyan moved to Belgium in 1909 to become coach of Racing Club de Bruxelles, while also assisting with the Belgian national side. He moved to Sweden in 1911 to manage Örgryte IS, before coaching the Swedish national side in time for the 1912 Summer Olympics. Bunyan returned to Belgium in 1912 to manage Standard Liège, and after a brief spell also managing the Belgian national side, his career was interrupted by the First World War, but he returned to Belgium after the war ended to coach Anderlecht.

Bunyan replaced Sylva Brébart as manager of Anderlecht in 1922, but died 10 months later and was replaced by his son, Charles.
