= Stade Henri-Jooris =

Sports stadium in Lille, France

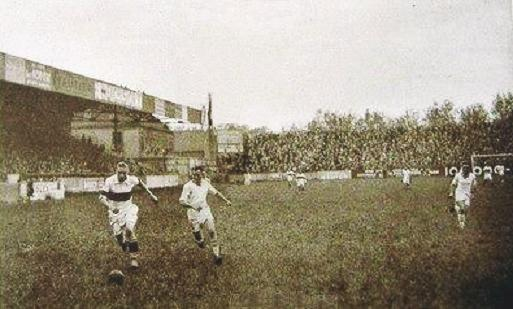
- Interactive map of Stade Henri-Jooris
- Former names: Stade de l'avenue de Dunkerque; Stade Victor Boucquey
- Location: Lille, France
- Coordinates: 50°38′15″N 3°2′10″E
- Capacity: 15,000

Construction
- Opened: 1902
- Demolished: 1975

Tenants
- Olympique Lillois (1907–1944); Lille OSC (1944–1974)

Stade Henri-Jooris was a sports stadium in Lille, France. The stadium, used mostly for football matches was able to hold 15,000 people and was home stadium of Olympique Lillois and Lille OSC.

Originally it was known as Stade de l'avenue de Dunkerque; from 1907 to 1943, the stadium's name was the Stade Victor Boucquey. That year it was renamed after the former president of Olympique Lillois Henri Jooris (who died four years before).

The stadium suffered a roof collapse during the Lens-Lille derby in February 1946. 53 spectators were injured as the structure partially collapsed during a 19th minute counterattack. The game was only delayed 20 minutes.

During the 1938 World Cup, it hosted one game.

The stadium was demolished in 1975, when Lille OSC moved to Stade Grimonprez-Jooris.

== 1938 FIFA World Cup ==
Date	Time	Team #1	Res.	Team #2	Round	Attendance
12 June 1938	17:00	Switzerland	0–2	Hungary	Quarter-finals	15,000
