= Maurice Bunyan =

English footballer and manager

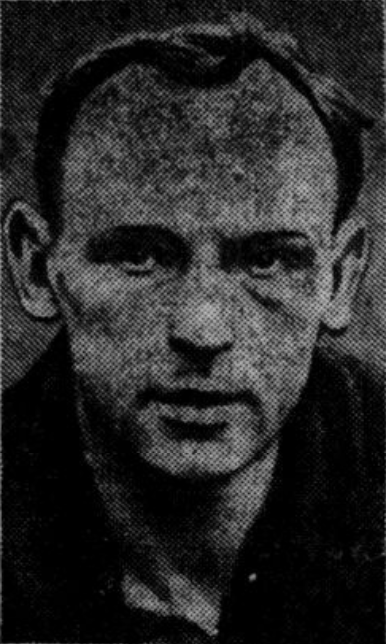
- Bunyan in 1927.

Personal information
- Full name: Maurice Taylor Bunyan
- Date of birth: 11 November 1893
- Place of birth: England
- Date of death: December 1967 (aged 74)
- Position: Striker

Senior career*
Years	Team	Apps	(Gls)
1909–1923	Racing Club de Bruxelles	158	(150)
1923–1926	Stade Français		

Managerial career
- 1945–1947: Bordeaux
- * Club domestic league appearances and goals

Maurice Taylor Bunyan (11 November 1893 – December 1967) was an English football player and manager active primarily in Belgium and France.

== Playing career ==
Bunyan played as a striker in Belgium for Racing Club de Bruxelles (where he scored 150 goals in 158 matches)) and in France for Stade Français. He was the topscorer of the Belgian First Division in 1912 and 1914. He also competed for Great Britain at the 1920 Summer Olympics.

== Managerial career ==
Bunyan managed French side Bordeaux between 1945 and 1947. Following his coaching experience, Bunyan wrote a book in French named Le football simplifié, with the help of Jules Rimet. In 1947 he followed Helenio Herrera as a coach of Stade Francais.

== Personal life ==
Bunyan's father was Charles Bunyan Sr. and his brother was Charles Bunyan Jr.

== Honours ==
=== Club ===
RC Bruxelles

- Belgian Cup: 1911–12

=== Individual ===
- Belgian First Division top scorer: 1911-12 (35 goals), 1913-14 (28 goals)
