= Maurice Gravelines =

French footballer (1891-1973)

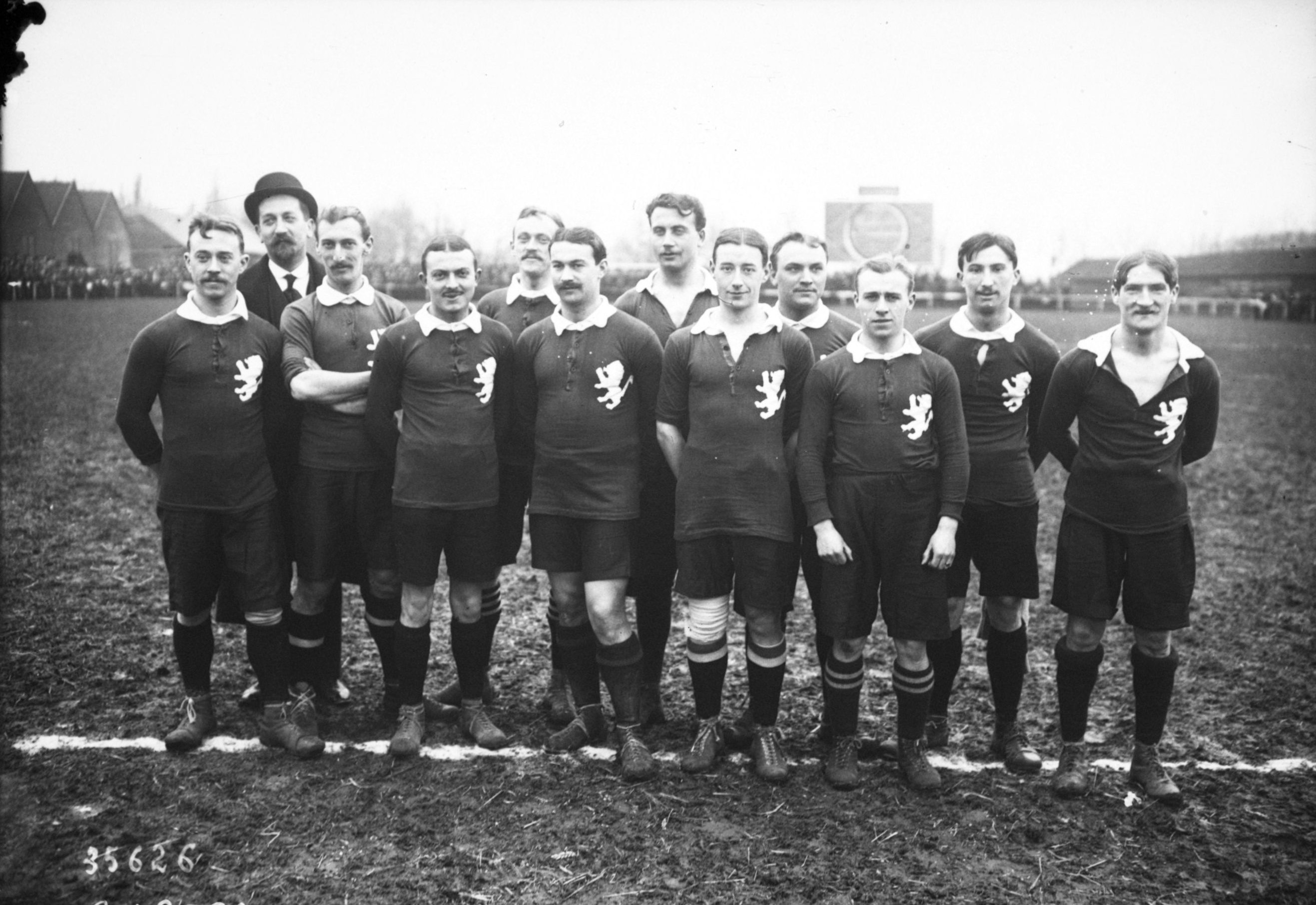

Personal information
- Date of birth: 17 July 1891
- Place of birth: Lille, France
- Date of death: 31 January 1973 (aged 81)
- Place of death: Lille, France

International career
Years	Team	Apps	(Gls)
1920-1922	France	2	(0)

Maurice Gravelines (17 July 1891 – 31 January 1973) was a French footballer. He played in two matches for the France national football team in 1920 and 1922.
