= Stade de Charentonneau =

Sports venue in Maisons-Alfort

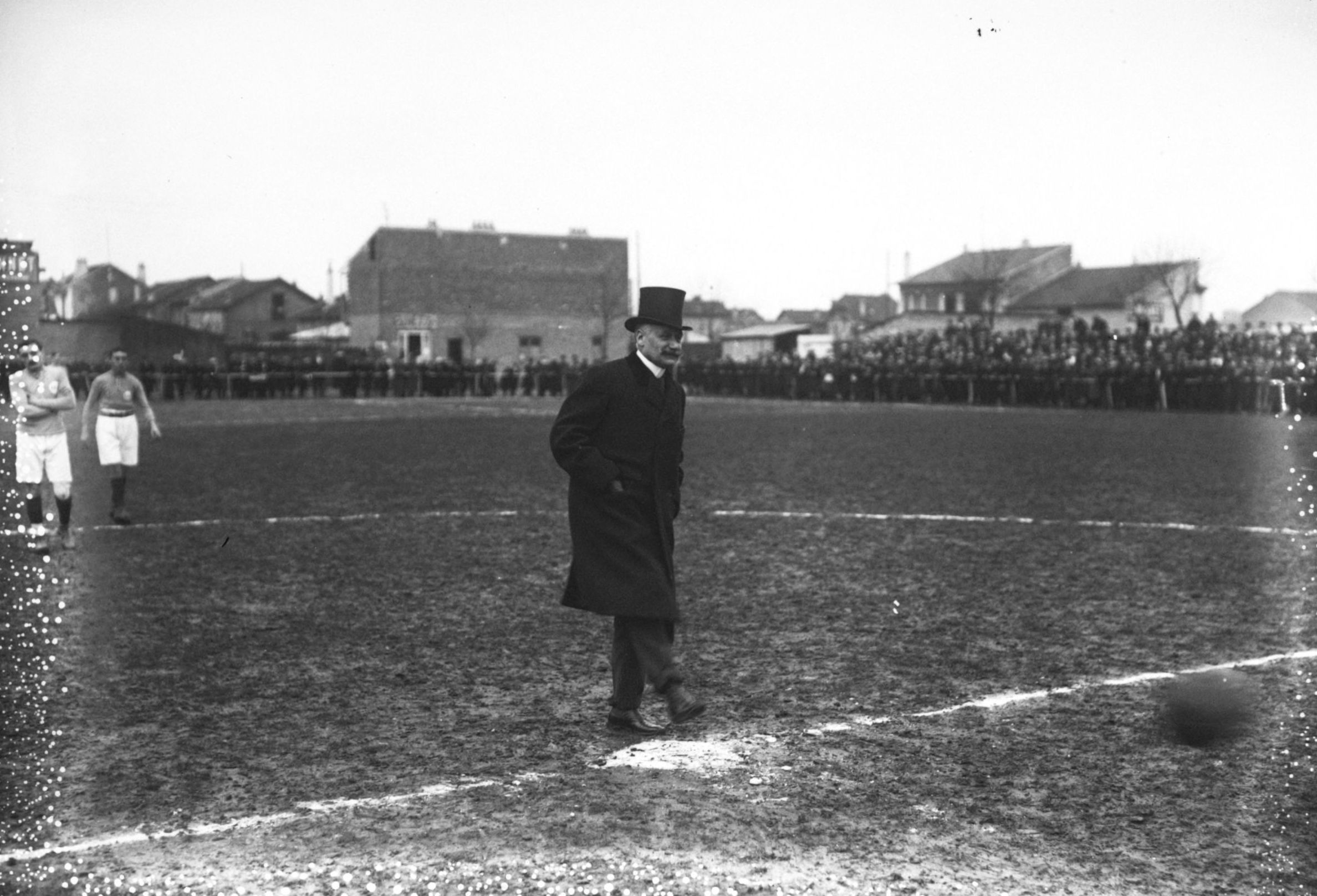
- General view of the Charentonneau Stadium on 22 March 1914 with the kick-off given by Mr. Le Corbeiller, vice-president of the Municipal Council at the time
- Interactive map of Stade de Charentonneau
- Location: Maisons-Alfort, France
- Coordinates: 48.8096°N 2.4415°E

Construction
- Opened: 1905
- Renovated: Natural lawn transformed into stabilized ground, and then into synthetic grass in 2011.

Tenant
- CA Paris (since 1905)

The Stade de Charentonneau is a football stadium located in the Charentonneau district of Maisons-Alfort, France. Since its inauguration in 1905, Charentonneau has been the home ground of CA Paris.

== History ==
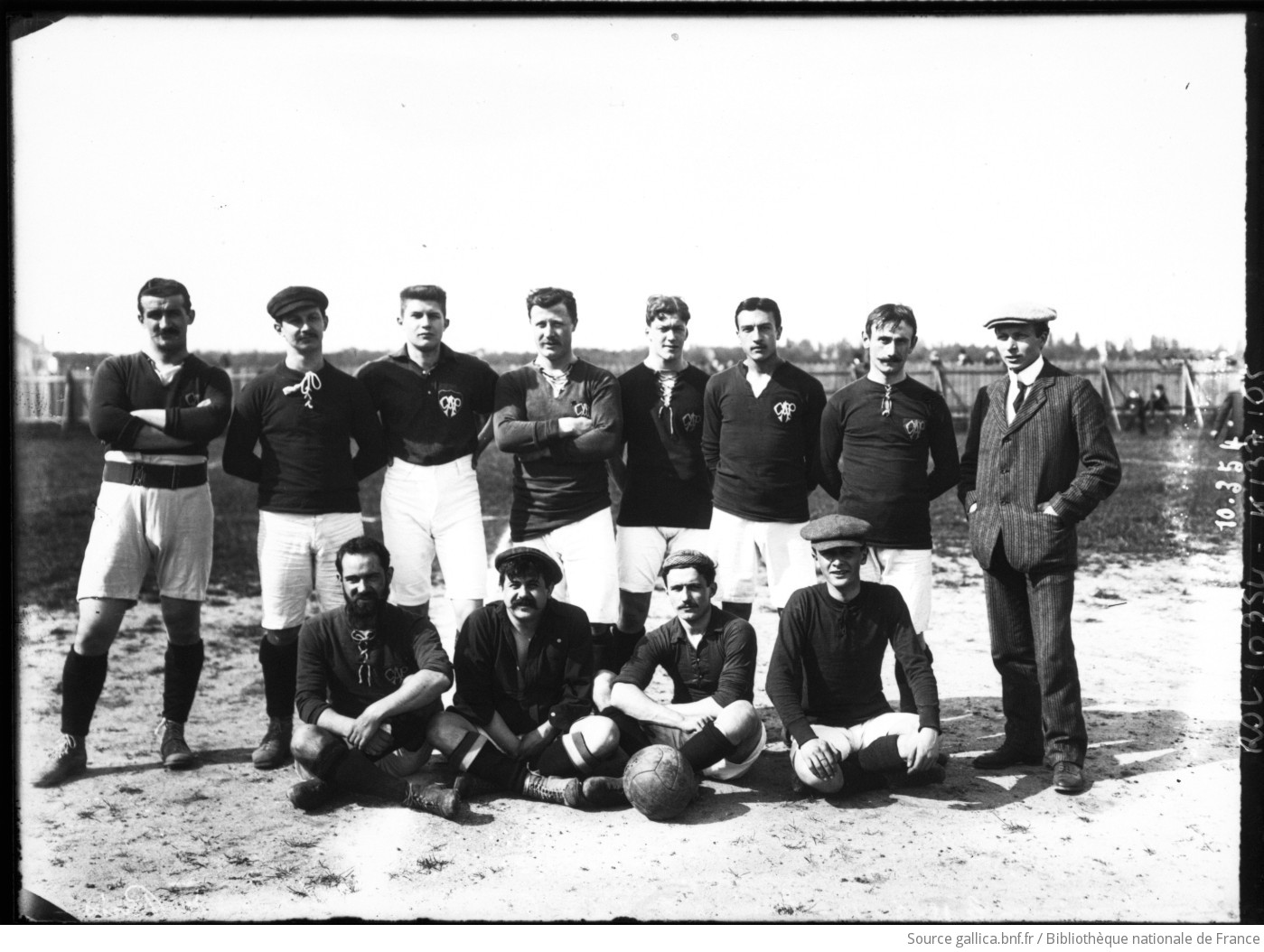
The football team of CA Paris at the Charentonneau stadium on 15 May 1910.

Since its inauguration in 1905, Charentonneau has been the home ground of CA Paris, one of the great Parisian clubs of the pioneering era of French football, and it is still used today by the club, now called Cercle Athlétique de Paris-Charenton, in addition to its usual Stade Henri Guérin located in Charenton-le-Pont.

Along with the Stade Bauer in Saint-Ouen, it is one of the first grounds specially designed for football in France, and therefore, shortly after its inauguration, the Charentonneau stadium hosted back-to-back finals of the Coupe Dewar in 1906 and 1907, both of which being won by Racing Club de France, with victories over Gallia Club (2–1) and Olympique Lillois (2–0), respectively. It also hosted the finals of 1909, in which AS Française was defeated 0–5 by Gallia Club, and of 1910, in which Gallia Club lost 3–1 to CA Paris. In the 1910s, the main venue of the Coupe Dewar final was Stade colombes.

In addition to being the emblematic stadium of CA Paris, Charentonneau also hosted an international match on 1 January 1911, a friendly between the French football team and Hungary in front of 2,032 spectators. This was the first match between the two teams and it ended in a 3–0 victory to Hungary thanks to a hat-trick from Imre Schlosser. Two months later, on 12 March, the Charentonneau hosted the final of the 1910–11 LFA Championship between CA Paris and Red Star AC, which ended in a 1–0 win to the latter. Three years later, on 26 April 1914, the Charentonneau hosted the final of the Trophée de France between Olympique Lillois and Vie au Grand Air du Médoc, which ended in a 4–1 win to the former.

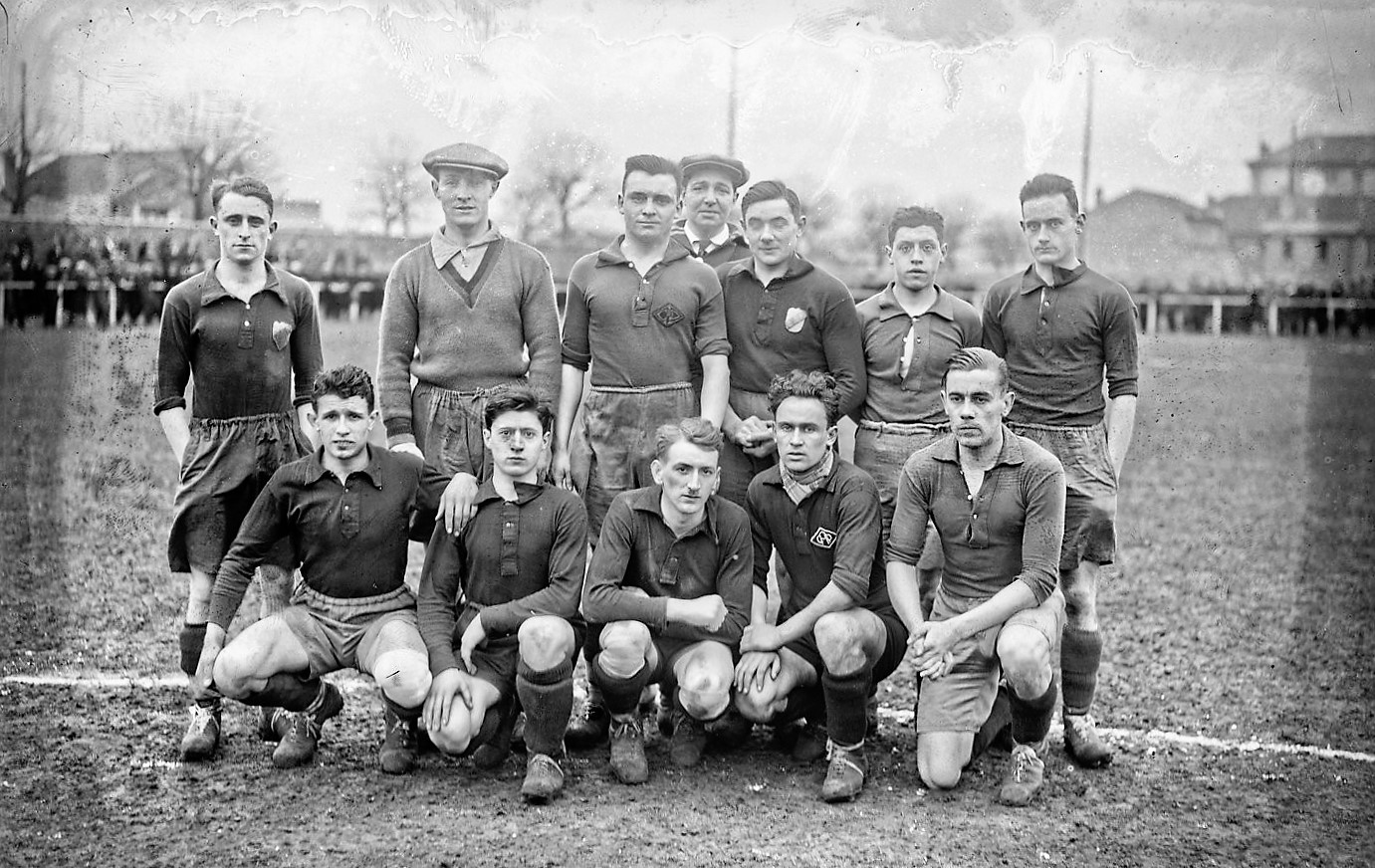
The football team of the Cercle Athlétique de Paris at the Charentonneau stadium on 30 January 1927.

During the 1928 Paris championship, CAP played for the title until the final day, in which they lost to Stade Français at Charentonneau, who thus won the championship. CAP played for many years in its stronghold of Charentonneau, where the club achieved its best performances before the First World War and during the interwar period. However, by the end of the 1930s, Charentonneau was no longer available: the land on which the stadium was built was sold by a manager of CAP, who held the majority.

== International matches ==
Team #1	Score	Team #2	Date	Attendance
Spain	0–3	Portugal	1 January 1911	2,032

== Biography ==
- Coll. (1967). La Coupe a 50 ans [The Cup is 50 years old] (in French). Paris: L'Équipe. p. 111.
