= Alphonse Six =

Belgian footballer

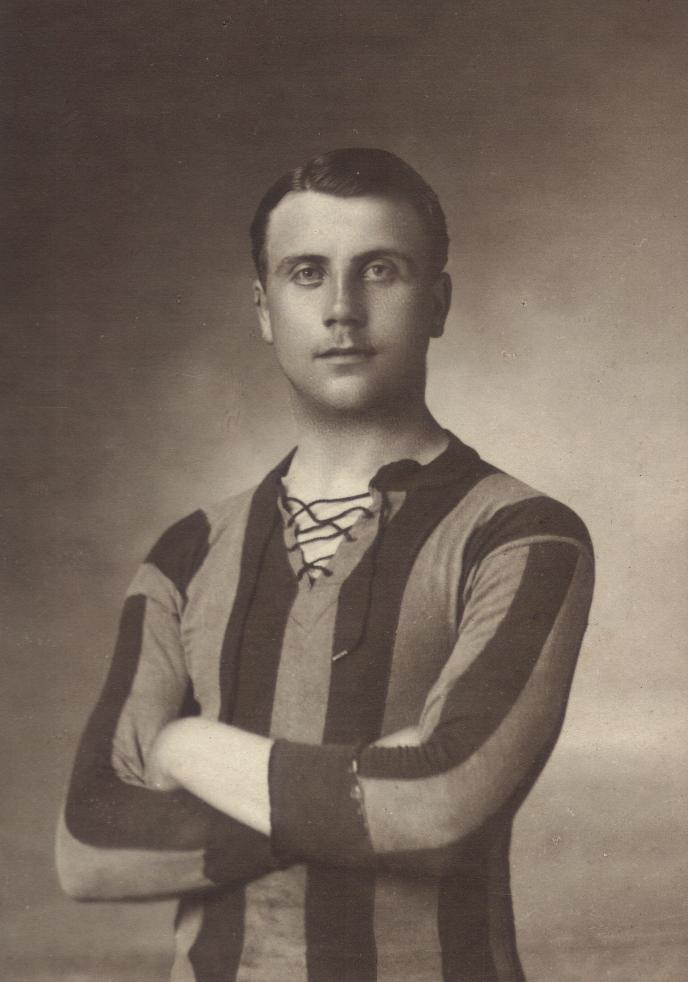

Personal information
- Full name: Alphonse Léopold Bauduin Six
- Date of birth: 1 January 1890
- Place of birth: Bruges, Belgium
- Date of death: 19 August 1914 (aged 24)
- Place of death: Boutersem, Belgium
- Position: Forward

Youth career
- Cercle Brugge

Senior career*
Years	Team	Apps	(Gls)
1907–1912	Cercle Brugge	87	(92)
1912–1913	Union SG		
1913–1914	Olympique Lillois		

International career^{‡}
1910–1912	Belgium	9	(8)
- * Club domestic league appearances and goals as of 27 May 2008 ‡ National team caps and goals as of 27 May 2008

Alphonse Léopold Bauduin Six (1 January 1890 – 19 August 1914) was a Belgian football player.

== Early life ==
Six was born in Bruges and is mainly remembered for his goal-scoring capacities.

== Career ==
In his period with Cercle Brugge he scored 93 times in only 89 matches.

His 1910–1911 season was especially remarkable, scoring 38 goals in 20 matches; half of the goals Cercle Brugge scored that season.

In 1910, Six received his first cap for Belgium, winning 3–2 against the Netherlands and scoring once. Six played nine times for Belgium, scoring eight goals.

Six still holds two Cercle Brugge team records:

- An average of 1.045 goals per match.
- Five goals in one match, against R.E. Sport's Club

In 1912, Six left Cercle for Union SG. Due to Union SG not keeping their promises about a job for him - professional footballers were unheard of at that time - he moved to Olympique Lillois, a predecessor of Lille OSC. That season he became the first Belgian football player to become a champion in a foreign country.

== Death ==
In the beginning of August 1914, the Germans invaded Belgium and Six was called to arms. After the fall of the forts in Liège, King Albert I pulled his troops back to Antwerp. During this manoeuvre, the Belgian troops were surrounded by the Germans near Boutersem. Six and his companions were killed on 19 August, only two weeks after war broke out.

== Palmares ==
=== Club ===
Cercle

- Belgian First Division: 1910–11

Union

- Belgian First Division: 1912–13
- Belgian Cup: 1912–13

Lille

- Trophée de France (fr): 1914
- Championnat USFSA (fr): 1914
- Championnat USFSA Nord (fr): 1914

=== Individual ===
- Belgian First Division top scorer: 1910-11 (40 goals)

Sporting positions
Preceded by (Belgium) Michel Nollet	Cercle Brugge top scorer 1910 – 1911 – 1912	Succeeded by (Belgium) Louis Saeys
