= USFSA Football Northern Championship =

USFSA Football Championship
- Organiser(s): USFSA
- Founded: 1898
- Abolished: 1914; 112 years ago
- Region: France
- Last champions: Olympique lillois (1914)
- Most championships: RC Roubaix (7 titles)

The USFSA Football Northern Championship was a French football competition, contested annually between 1898 and 1914 and organized by the Northern Committee of the Union of French Athletic Sports Societies (USFSA), which brought together clubs from the Nord and Pas-de-Calais departments.

From 1899 onwards, the winner of this regional competition qualified for the USFSA Football Championship, where the northern clubs competed with the Parisian clubs, becoming French champion seven times, including five from RC Roubaix, and one each from both US Tourquennoise and Olympique lillois. Thanks to the results of the Lions of Flanders and Olympique Lillois in the early 1910s, it can reasonably be said that northern football was the best in France, but then the First World War broke out, in which Northern France was occupied for 4 years, thus interrupting the activities of the team and causing the death of many of its players. On 19 August 1919, the Northern Football Association League (LNFA) was founded by twenty clubs, which began competing in the Northern Football League.

== Format ==
The USFSA Northern Championship was divided in two: the land and the maritime, whose winners were opposed in a final. The former was usually won by US Boulogne or RC Calais in the maritime championship, and then only met RC Roubaix or US Tourquennoise in the regional final.

== 1900–01 Northern Championship ==
The final featured the winners of the interior and maritime groups, the Iris Club lillois and the US Calais, on the "deplorable state" pitch of the Iris Club on 10 February 1901 in front of a "large crowd". The match was very unbalanced, and after conceding nine goals, US Calais gave up, so the rest of the match was basically a training session, with Lillois finally winning by the resounding score of 15–0, thanks to goals from Munce (7), Dévit (4), Guilloux (3), and Bauet (1).

== 1905–06 Northern Championship ==
In the 1906 final between the maritime champions Boulogne and the land champions Roubaix, the latter won 1–0 thanks to a goal from André François.

== 1909–10 Northern Championship ==
On 27 February 1910, US Tourquennoise won the title on the last matchday by holding Olympique Lillois to a 0–0 draw, who needed a victory to be champion.

Northern Championship Standings
Pos	Team	Pld	W	D	L	Pts
1	US Tourquennoise (title holder)	18	15	1	2	49
2	Olympique lillois	18	14	2	2	48
3	RC Calais	18	10	4	4	42
4	RC Roubaix	18	11	1	6	41
5	Stade roubaisien	18	7	4	7	36
6	SC tourquennois	18	9	0	9	36
7	US Boulogne	18	6	3	9	33
8	US Malo-les-Bains	18	3	3	12	27
9	SO calaisien	18	2	3	13	25
10	US Calais	18	1	3	14	23

== 1911–12 Northern Championship ==
Northern Championship Standings
Pos	Team	Pld	W	D	L	Pts
1	US Tourquennoise	14	11	2	1	38
2	RC Calais	14	7	4	3	32
3	Olympique lillois (title holder)	14	9	1	4	33
4	RC Roubaix	14	8	0	6	30
5	Stade roubaisien	14	7	0	7	28
6	US boulonnaise	14	6	1	7	27
7	US Malo-les-Bains	14	2	2	10	20
8	SC tourquennois	14	1	0	13	16

== 1912–13 Northern Championship ==
Northern Championship Standings
Pos	Team	Pld	W	D	L	GF	GA	GD	Pts
1	Olympique lillois	14	13	0	1	72	15	+57	40
2	US Tourquennoise (title holder)	14	12	0	2	57	14	+43	38
3	RC Roubaix	14	8	0	6	33	40	−7	30
4	RC Calais	14	7	1	6	26	22	+4	29
5	US Boulogne	14	6	1	7	42	39	+3	27
6	Stade roubaisien	14	4	1	9	35	43	−8	23
7	RC Arras (promoted)	14	2	1	11	15	59	−44	19
8	US Malo	14	2	0	12	12	60	−48	18

== 1913–14 Northern Championship ==
Northern Championship Standings
Pos	Team	Pld	W	D	L	Pts
1	Olympique lillois (title holder)	14	12	1	1	39
2	US Tourquennoise	14	11	2	1	38
3	Club lillois (promoted)	14	6	3	5	29
4	US Boulogne	14	6	1	7	27
5	RC Roubaix	14	5	0	9	24
6	Stade roubaisien	14	4	2	8	24
7	RC Calais	14	4	2	8	24
8	OSC boulonnais (promoted)	14	1	3	10	19

== Titles ==
Edition	Winners	Score	Runner-up	Result in the French Championship
1898	Iris Club lillois			No participation
1899	Iris Club lillois			Semi-final
1900	US Tourquennoise			Semi-final
1901	Iris Club lillois			Semi-final
1902	RC Roubaix			Champion
1903	RC Roubaix			Champion
1904	RC Roubaix			Champion
1905	RC Roubaix			Final
1906	RC Roubaix	1–0	US Boulogne	Champion
1907	RC Roubaix			Final
1908	RC Roubaix			Champion
1909	US Tourquennoise			Semi-final
1910	US Tourquennoise			Champion
1911	Olympique lillois			Quarter-finals
1912	US Tourquennoise			Semi-final
1913	Olympique lillois			Quarter-finals
1914	Olympique lillois			Champion
