= 1914 USFSA Football Championship =

Statistics of the USFSA Football Championship in the 1914 season.

== Tournament ==
=== First round ===
- Racing Club de Reims 7-0 La fraternelle d'Ailly
- FC Lyon 6-2 US Annemasse
- Football club de Braux 4-2 Cercle des Sports Stade Lorrain
- SM Caen 6-1 US Le Mans
- Sporting Club angérien - ASNG Tarbes (Tarbes forfeited)
- Red Star Association de Besançon - AS Michelin (Clermont forfeited)

=== Second round ===
- AS Montbéliard 5-4 Red Star Association de Besançon

=== Third round ===
- Racing Club de Reims 6-0 Football club de Braux
- FC Lyon 5-0 AS Montbéliard
- Stade quimpérois - SM Caen (Quimper forfeited)

=== 1/8 Final ===
- Stade Bordelais UC 3-1 Stade toulousain
- FC Lyon 3-2 SH Marseille
- Union sportive Servannaise 3-3 SM Caen
- FC Rouen 4-3 Racing Club de Reims
- Olympique de Cette - Sporting Club angérien (Saint-Jean forfeited)

=== Quarterfinals ===
- Olympique de Cette 2-1 Stade Bordelais UC
- . Union sportive Servannaise 1-0 AS Française
- . FC Rouen 0-1 Olympique Lillois
- Stade Raphaëlois 3-1 FC Lyon

=== Semifinals ===
- . Olympique de Cette 3-1 Stade Raphaëlois
- Olympique Lillois 8-1 Union sportive Servannaise

=== Final ===
- Olympique Lillois 3-0 Olympique Cettois
