= Olympique Lillois =

- Full name: Olympique Lillois
- Nickname: Les Dogues (The Mastiffs)
- Founded: 1902; 124 years ago
- Dissolved: 1944; 82 years ago (merged with SC Fives to become Lille OSC)
- Ground: Stade Henri-Jooris
- Capacity: 15,000
Home colours	Away colours

Olympique Lillois was a French association football club from the city of Lille. Founded in 1902 they merged with SC Fives in 1944 to form Lille OSC.

== Honours ==
Championnat de France

- Champion: 1914, 1933
- Runner-up: 1936

Trophée de France

- Winner: 1914

Championnat USFSA

- Champion: 1914

Championnat USFSA Nord:

- Champion: 1911, 1913, 1914

Championnat DH Nord:

- Champion: 1921, 1922, 1929, 1931

Coupe Peugeot:

- Finalist: 1931

== Coaches ==
- 1931–32: Imre Nagy
- 1932–34: Robert De Veen
- 1934–35: Bob Fisher
- 1935–37: Ted Magner
- 1937–38: Steirling
- 1938–39: Jenő Konrád
- 1941–43: Georges Winckelmans
- 1943–44: Denglos

== Bibliography ==
- Paul Hurseau & Jacques Verhaeghe (1997). Olympique Lillois, Sporting Club Fivois, Lille O.S.C. Éditions Alan Sutton. ISBN 2842530802.
- Christian Dorvillé (2010). Grandes figures sportives du Nord-Pas-de-Calais. Presses Universitaires du Septentrion. ISBN 9782757401521.
- Hassen Slimani (2000). La professionnalisation du football français : Un modèle de dénégations (PDF). Archived from the original (PDF) on 6 July 2010.
