= Louis Strittmatter =

French footballer

Personal information
- Date of birth: 1 August 1875
- Place of birth: 9th arrondissement of Paris, France
- Position: Defender

Senior career*
Years	Team	Apps	(Gls)
1893–1900	Club Français		
- * Club domestic league appearances and goals

Louis Strittmatter (1 August 1875 – unknown) was a French footballer who played as a defender for Club Français in the 1890s.

== Playing career ==
=== Club career ===
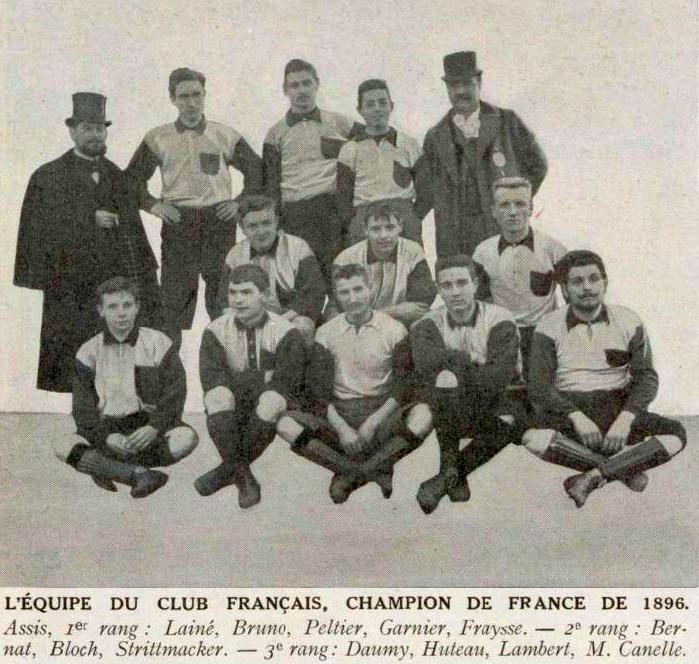
Strittmatter (second line, first from right) with the Club Français team that won the 1896 championship of France.

Born on 1 August 1875 in the 9th arrondissement of Paris, Strittmatter was one of the first players of Club Français, which had been founded in October 1892, and which joined the USFSA in March 1894; in the following month, on 22 April, the 19-year-old Strittmatter started as a defender in the semifinal of the inaugural USFSA championship, which ended in a 0–1 loss to The White Rovers. Together with Lucien Huteau, Gaston Peltier, Georges Garnier, and captain Eugène Fraysse, he was a starting midfielder in the Club Français team that won the 1896 USFSA Football Championship, doing so without losing a single match.

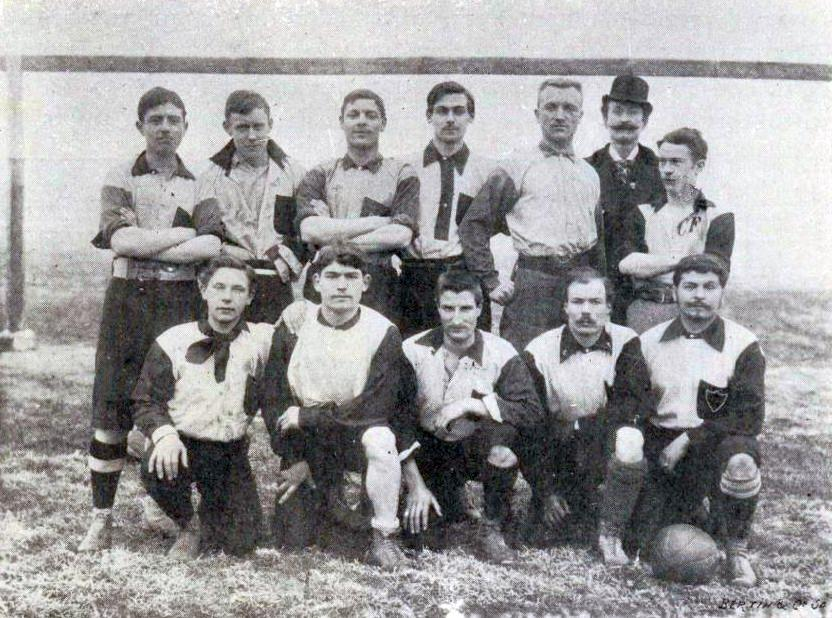
Strittmatter (standing, second from right) with Club Français at the Parc des Princes on 26 December 1897.

On 26 December 1897, Strittmatter started in the very first football match in the history of the Parc des Princes in front of 500 spectators, in which Club Français was defeated 1–3 by the English Ramblers; during the match, he scored a goal from a free kick, but it was disallowed since no one had touched the ball. Three months later, on 28 March, he started as a midfielder for Club Français in the 1898 Coupe Manier final at the Vélodrome de Vincennes, helping his side to a 10–0 win over Paris Star. In the following week, on 3 April, he started in the final of the 1898 USFSA Football Championship against Standard AC at Courbevoie, being seriously injured in the first-half, which interrupted the match, and without him, CF lost 2–3. This injury seems to have ended his career since he never again appears in the line-up of a CF match.

== Later life ==
On 1 April 1907, on the occasion of a match between the English club Old Etonians and the so-called Vieilles Gloires ("Old Glories"), a team made up of fellow retired players from the 1890s, the 32-year-old Strittmatter, who had been living in Lille for ten years, returned to Paris to reunite his former CF teammates, such as Garnier and Ernest Weber; he only watched the match.

The date of his death remains unknown.

== Honours ==
Club Français

- USFSA Football Championship:
  - Champions (1): 1896
  - Runner-up (3): 1898
- Coupe Manier:
  - Champions (1): 1898
