= Charles Bernat =

French footballer (5 May 1876 – 28 December 1948)

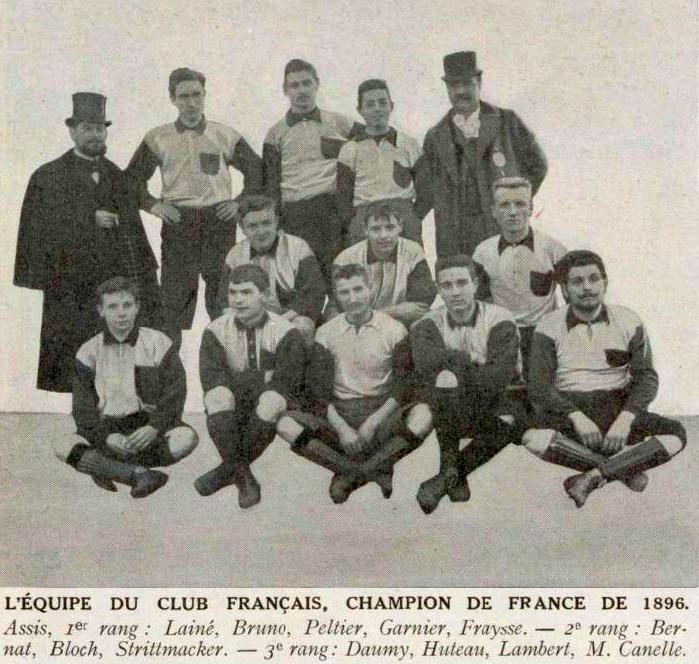
- Bernat (2nd row, first from left) in 1896

Personal information
- Full name: Charles Auguste Bernat
- Date of birth: 5 May 1876
- Place of birth: 17th arrondissement of Paris, France
- Date of death: 28 December 1948 (aged 72)
- Place of death: 13th arrondissement of Paris, France
- Position: Midfielder

Senior career*
Years	Team	Apps	(Gls)
1892–1900	Club Français		
1907	Vieilles Gloires	+1	(0)

International career
1895–1898	Paris XI	2	(0)
- * Club domestic league appearances and goals

Charles Auguste Bernat (5 May 1876 – 28 December 1948) was a French footballer who co-founded Club Français in 1892, with whom he won the 1896 USFSA Football Championship.

== Early life and education ==
Charles Bernat was born in Paris on 5 May 1876, as the son of Pierre Jean Baptiste Bernat (1849–1902) from Manhac and Marie Zurbuchen (1847–1905) from Bern, Switzerland.

As the son of a well-off family from the wealthy districts of Paris, he was sent to Britain for a language study trip, doing so at the Catholic St Joseph's College, Dumfries, Scotland, where he developed a deep interest in football, and where he might have met José María Barquín and Enrique Goiri, the latter being just one year younger than him, both of whom being fellow football enthusiasts from the European mainland.

== Sporting career ==
=== Club Français ===
Shortly after returning to Paris to complete his studies at the Lycée Janson-de-Sailly, he met Eugène Fraysse, who had also become a football fan while studying abroad, so they decided to join forces to import the sport into France, and together, they founded Club Français in October 1892, which was the first club reserved exclusively for the French, hence the club's name.

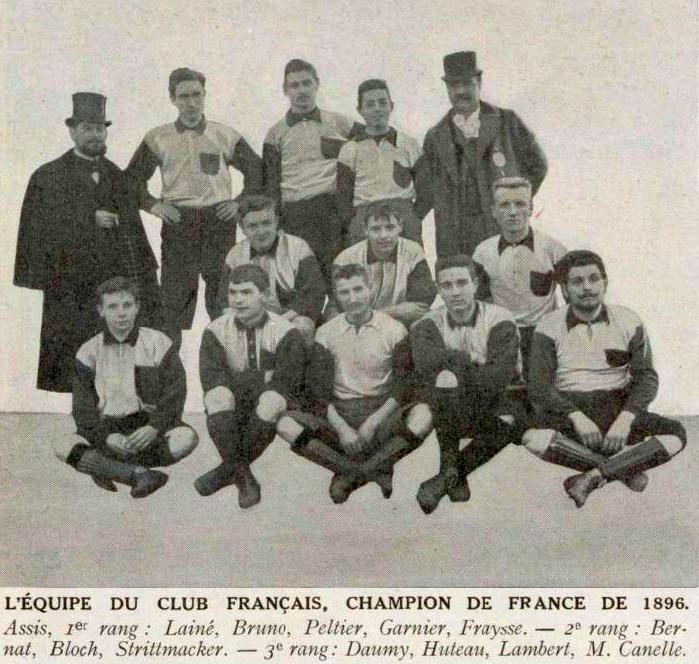
Bernat (2nd row, first from left) featured in the Club Français team that won the 1896 championship of France.

Club Français joined the USFSA in March 1894, and on 22 April of the same year, Bernat played as a midfielder in the semifinal of the inaugural USFSA championship, which ended in a 0–1 loss to The White Rovers. On 24 February 1895, Bernat and his teammate Fraysse were the only Frenchman selected to play for the first representative team of Paris in a friendly match against the London-based Folkestone at the soggy pitch of the Seine Velodrome, which ended in a 0–3 loss.

Together with Lucien Huteau, Marcel Lambert, Gaston Peltier, Georges Garnier, and captain Fraysse, Bernat was a starter in the Club Français team that won the 1896 USFSA Football Championship, doing so without losing a single match. In the following year, on 25 April 1897, he started in the final of the inaugural Coupe Manier against the newly crowded champions of France Standard AC, helping his side to a 4–3 win after extra-time. On 13 December 1898, Bernat was one of the five players from Club Français who featured in a selection of the best Parisian players from the USFSA in a friendly against a German national selection in front of 200 people; Paris lost 1–2. In April 1899, he was a member of the football commission of the USFSA.

On 16 April 1899, Bernat started in the play-off match against Standard AC to decide the 1898–99 USFSA Paris Championship, helping his side to a 3–2 win. In the following year, on 6 May, he started in the final of the 1900 USFSA Football Championship, which ended in a 0–1 loss to Le Havre AC.

=== Later career ===
Like so many other footballers of his time, his career came to an end with marriage, doing so in the 9th arrondissement of Paris on 5 January 1901, to the Belgian Jeanne Charlotte Goulancourt (1873–1941). Following the death of Lucien Canelle in 1905, his son Fernand took over the presidency of the Club Français, which he ran with the help of Bernat until the outbreak of the First World War in 1914.

On 1 April 1907, the 31-year-old Bernat put on his boots again to serve as the captain of the so-called Vieilles Gloires ("Old Glories"), a team made up of fellow retired players from the 1890s, which included some of his former CF teammates, such as Garnier, René Ressejac-Duparc, and Ernest Weber. They faced the English club Old Etonians, and after conceding three goals in the first half, the captain Bernat made some changes at half-time, which improved the team as the game ended in a 1–4 loss. After the match, the two teams dined together and toasted to each other, while "Miss Goulancourt of the Opera" (the alias of Miss Bernat) made herself heard, and "had it not been for the fear of being indiscreet, the audience would have long requested the favor of hearing the harmonious and graceful voice of Miss Bernat".

A few days later, on 7 April, Bernat attended the final of the 1907 USFSA Football Championship between RC France and RC Roubaix, alongside other former CF players, such as Garnier and Duparc.

== Rugby ==
At some point, Bernat became the director of the Stade Buffalo in Montrouge, which was inaugurated in 1922 and could accommodate 20,000 spectators for football or rugby union matches. Following a pioneering tour of England, Bernat filed the statutes of the "French Rugby League XIII" on 6 April 1934 in Paris, and the entity's board was then elected, with François Cadoret being appointed as president, Charles Bernat as secretary general, and Louis Delblat, new director of Stade Buffalo, as treasurer.

== Later life and death ==
On 13 December 1915, Bernat divorced Goulancourt, and a few months later, on 25 May 1916, he married Alice Pauline Georgette Nico at the Saint-Maur-des-Fossés.

Outside football, he was a businessman and accountant. Bernat died in the 13th arrondissement of Paris on 28 December 1948, at the age of 72.

== Honours ==
Club Français

- USFSA Paris Championship:
  - Champions (1): 1898–99
- USFSA Football Championship:
  - Champions (1): 1896
  - Runner-up (1): 1900
- Coupe Manier:
  - Champions (1): 1897
