= René Ressejac-Duparc =

French association footballer (1880–1941)

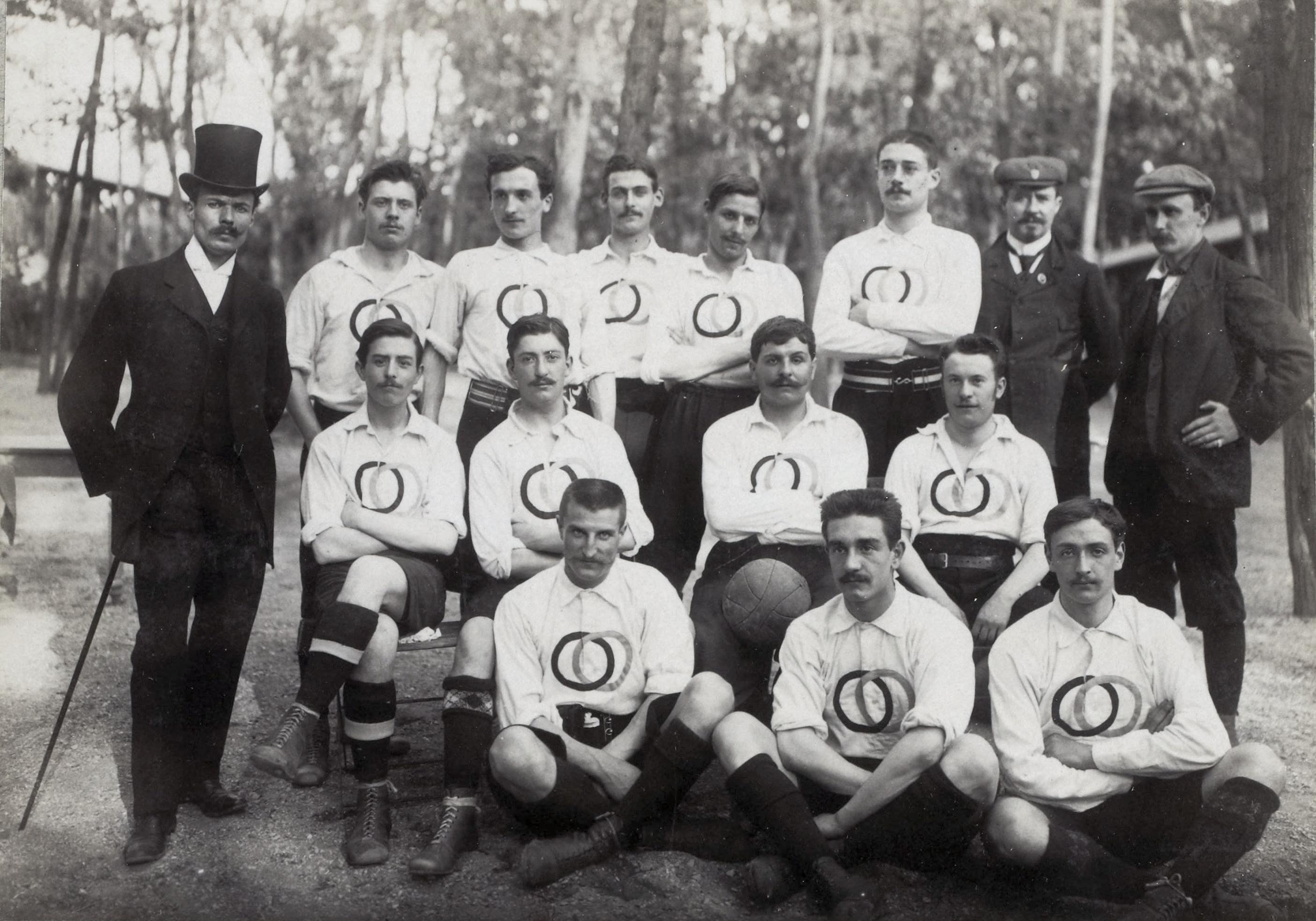
- The French team at the 1900 Olympics

Personal information
- Full name: René Ressejac-Duparc
- Date of birth: 28 September 1880
- Place of birth: Suresnes, Paris, France
- Date of death: 19 April 1941 (aged 60)
- Place of death: Pornic, France
- Height: 1.65 m (5 ft 5 in)
- Position: Midfielder

Senior career*
Years	Team	Apps	(Gls)
–1898	Union Sportive de Puteaux		
1898–1903	Club Français		
1907	Vieilles Gloires	+1	(0)

International career
1900	France MNT	2	(0+)
Medal record
Men's football
Representing France
Football at the Summer Olympics
Silver medal – second place	1900 Paris	Team competition
- * Club domestic league appearances and goals

René Ressejac-Duparc (28 September 1880 – 19 April 1941) was a French footballer who played as a midfielder and who competed in the 1900 Olympic Games, winning a silver medal as a member of the USFSA team, which was primarily Club Français players. With Club Français, he won back-to-back Coupe Manier titles in 1899 and 1900, and he also reached the finals of the 1900 Challenge International du Nord, and of the 1899 and 1900 USFSA Football Championship.

== Early and personal life ==
René Ressejac-Duparc was born on 28 September 1880, lived in Puteaux, and was employed at the Banque de France. He had connections to Loire-Atlantique through his mother (originally from Châteaubriant), as well as a home in Pornic, where he died on 19 April 1941, at the age of 60. Biographer Stéphane Gachet suggested Duparc was in Pornic "perhaps to take refuge during the war".

Duparc remained practically unknown and of uncertain identity for several decades since he was only cited in the database of the International Olympic Committee (IOC) as a "medalist for France in football" in 1900, with no first name and no other information published about this Olympic footballer until the December 2023 book "All the French medalists from 1896 to the present". The biography in the book was compiled from research by Stéphane Gachet, who investigated unknown French Olympians ahead of the 2024 Olympic Games in Paris, and who found genealogical records matching the footballer to René Ressejac-Duparc. Gachet then contacted his grandson, Patrick Ressejac-Duparc, who lived in Portugal with his wife, to tell him that his grandfather was an Olympic medalist.

== Club career ==
=== Early career ===
Duparc began his career at US Puteaux; on 28 March 1898, the 17-year-old Duparc played as a forward for a Puteaux team made up of players from both its first and the second team, helping his side to a 12–0 win over the second team of US Parisienne.

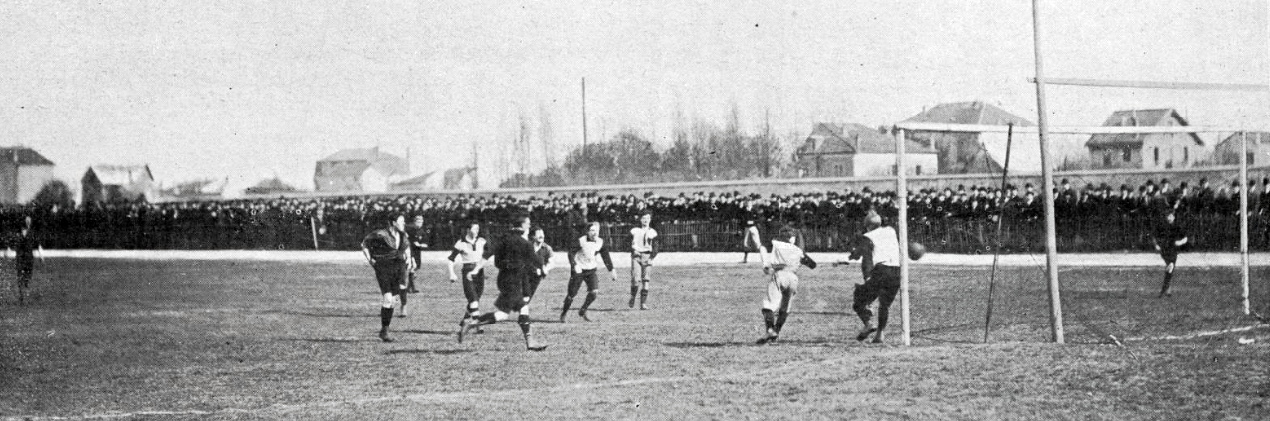
Play-off match for the 1899 Paris championship in Bécon-les-Bruyères between Club Français and Standard AC.

Duparc joined Club Français in 1898, at the age of 18, and his mentor was said to be Club Français midfielder Alfred Bloch. In the following year, Club Français won the 1898–99 USFSA Paris championship, the top-level division tournament, after defeating Standard AC (3–2) in a play-off match to decide the title on 16 April, and this victory qualified the club to the 1899 USFSA national championship, in which CF withdrew from the final before facing Le Havre AC.

=== 1899–1900 season ===
On 23 October, Duparc started in the final of the 1899 Coupe Manier, helping his side to a 6–0 win over RC Roubaix. On 29 April 1900, he started in the final of the 1900 Challenge International du Nord against Le Havre AC, scoring his side's second goal to tie the match and force extra-time in an eventual 2–3 loss. He then missed the final of the 1900 USFSA Football Championship on 6 May, which ended in another loss to Le Havre AC (0–1), partly because CF's "forward line was disorganized due to the absence of Duparc".

=== 1900–01 season ===
On 16 October 1900, a match summary in L'Auto wrote that he was a change to the team's midfield, but as "a good player who knows his job", it marked an improvement. Later that month, Duparc continued in the midfield when the team began competing in the 1900–01 USFSA Paris championship, playing in all but one match (during which his absence, despite replacement, was noted). During the tournament, L'Auto noted that Duparc was one of the youngest players on the team and that he showed a lot of promise but was already "a good player, very resistant, very tough". In a match against Standard AC in early December, he was injured in the first half as the match ended in a 1–1 draw, which was sufficient for Standard to secure the title.

Duparc was also in the winning Club Français line-up, playing in each match, for the 1900 Coupe Manier, which took place later in December. After winning the Coupe Manier, CF's first (including Duparc) and second teams played international friendlies against Croydon and their reserves. Duparc's performance in this match was praised, with his intelligent ball-passing in the first half said to break up Croydon attacks and his "beautiful" passes to the team's forwards in the second half often drawing applause; it ended in a 3–3 draw.

On 6 January 1901, Club Français faced Standard AC again, this time in the preliminary rounds of the 1901 Challenge International du Nord, which ended in a 0–1 loss. With the referee getting lost in the game, the play turned brutal, mostly perpetrated by Standard, who targeted the CF midfielders; Bloch was kicked so hard in the stomach that he had to go off, while Duparc along with Louis Bach and Cuny were "badly hit"; Club Français wrote a letter of complaint to the football association. Duparc's misfortune continued; when travelling to compete in another match in January 1901, a group called la bande noire burgled him, taking his shoes and bag. In February 1901, Duparc began playing as a forward again, still with Club Français.

=== Later career ===
On 4 January 1903, Duparc started in the final of the 1902 Coupe Manier at Le Vésinet, helping his side to a 7–0 win over Olympique Lillois. Three months later, on 15 March, he started in the final of the 1903 Coupe Dewar against United SC, in which he scored an own goal in an eventual 3–4 loss.

On 1 April 1907, the 27-year-old Duparc came out of retirement to play for the so-called Vieilles Gloires ("Old Glories"), playing alongside several former fellow CF players, including two of its founders, Charles Bernat and Ernest Weber; they lost 4–1 to the Old Etonians.

== International career ==
Duparc was listed as a forward for the USFSA (French amateur) team, composed mostly of Club Français players, at the 1900 Olympic Games. He was not selected for the opening match against Upton Park on 20 September, which ended in a humiliating 0–4 loss, so Duparc was then picked up for the second match three days later, helping his side to a 6–2 victory over Belgium, which was mostly made up of students from the French-speaking Université libre de Bruxelles; the authors of four of these goals are unknown, so Duparc, who started as a forward alongside teammates Georges Garnier and Gaston Peltier, might have scored at least one of them. The French team came second and Duparc was thus awarded with a silver medal.

== Honours ==
=== Club ===
Club Français

- USFSA Paris Championship:
  - Champions (2): 1898–99 and 1899–1900
- USFSA Football Championship:
  - Runner-up (2): 1899 and 1900
- Coupe Manier:
  - Champions (3): 1899, 1900, and 1902
- Challenge International du Nord:
  - Runner-up (1): 1900

=== International ===
France MNT

- Summer Olympics:
  - Silver medal (1): 1900
