= Marcel Lambert (footballer) =

French footballer

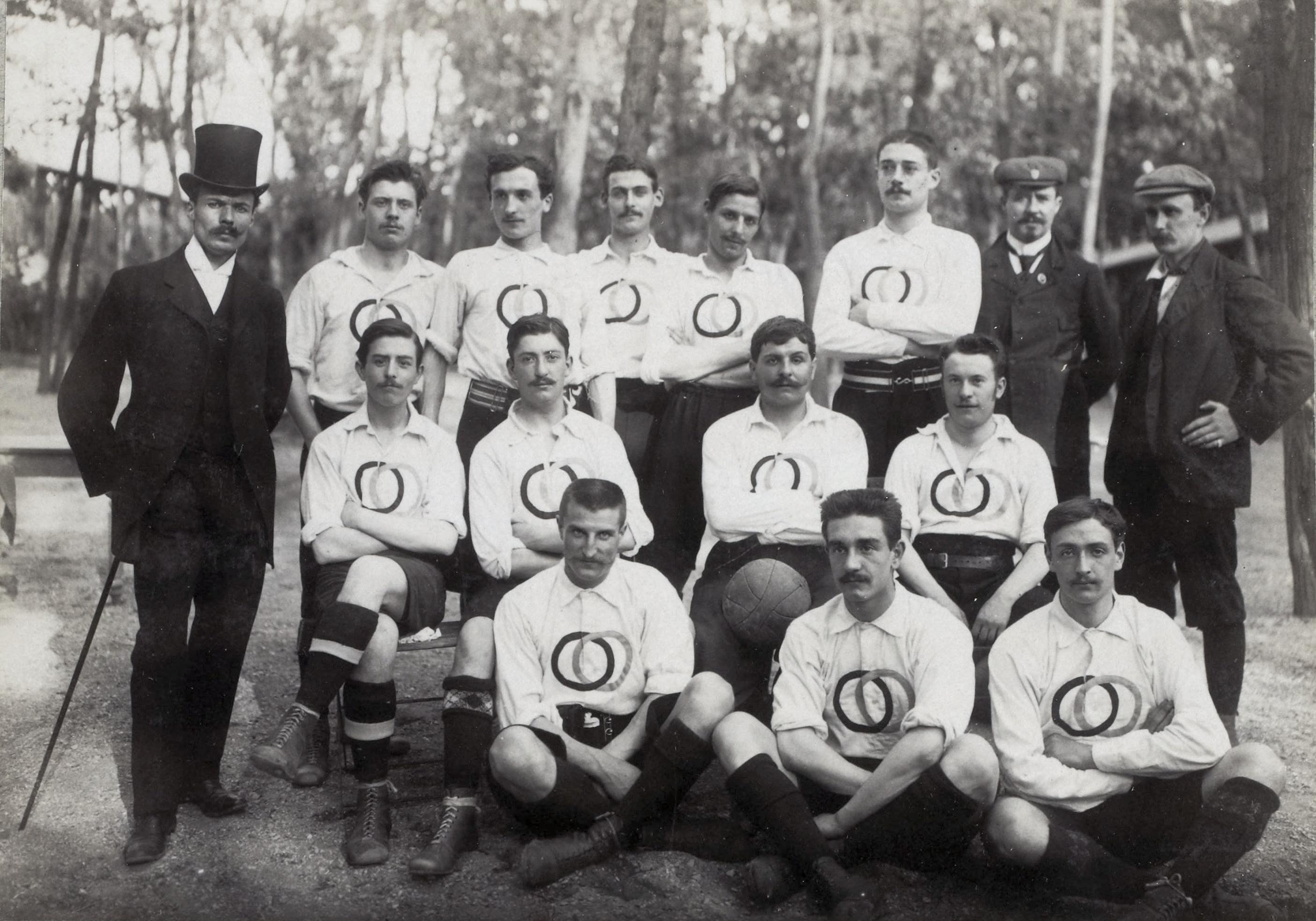
- Lambert (2nd row, first from the left) with the French team at the 1900 Olympics

Personal information
- Full name: Marcel Lambert
- Date of birth: 1876
- Place of birth: Saint-Philippe-d'Aiguille, France
- Date of death: Unknown
- Place of death: 15th arrondissement of Paris, France
- Position: Forward

Senior career*
| Years | Team | Apps | (Gls) |
| 1895–1901 | Club Français | | |

International career
| 1900 | France (Olympic) | 2 | (+0) |
Medal record
Men's football
Representing France
Football at the Summer Olympics
| Silver medal – second place | 1900 Paris | Team competition |
- * Club domestic league appearances and goals

Marcel Lambert (1876 – unknown) was a French footballer who played as a forward and who competed in the football tournament at the 1900 Olympic Games in Paris, winning a silver medal as a member of the USFSA Olympic team representing France, which was primarily made up of Club Français players.

== Early life ==
Marcel Lambert was born in 1876, and he had a younger brother, André François Leonard Lambert, born on 20 February 1877, and who died from tuberculosis at his home at 173 rue de Vaugirard in the 15th arrondissement of Paris on 8 September 1901, at the young age of 24. His funeral took place two days later at the church of Notre-Dame-des-Champs, Paris, and he was then buried in the Parisian cemetery of Bagneux. The date and circumstances of Marcel's death, however, remain unknown.

== Playing career ==
=== Club career ===
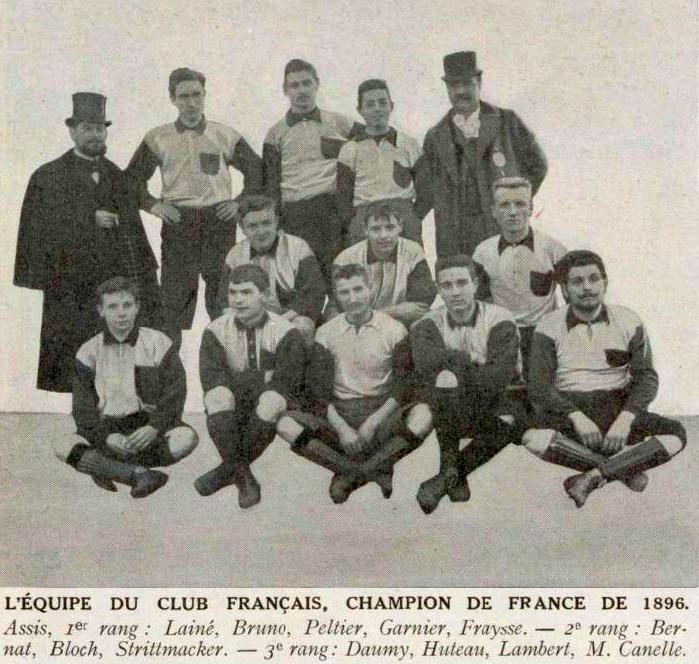
Lambert (standing, second from right) featured in the Club Français team that won the 1896 championship of France.

Lambert was one of the first players of Club Français, which joined the USFSA in March 1894, and on 22 April of the same year, the 17-year-old Lambert started as a forward in the semifinal of the inaugural USFSA championship, which ended in a 0–1 loss to The White Rovers. Together with Lucien Huteau, Gaston Peltier, Georges Garnier, and captain Eugène Fraysse, Lambert was a starter in the Club Français team that won the 1896 USFSA Football Championship without losing a single match, pairing with Daumy at the back, and they formed a strong defensive partnership as they conceded just two goals in eight matches: one against Rovers (4–1 victory on 23 February) and one against Standard AC (4–1 victory on 15 March).

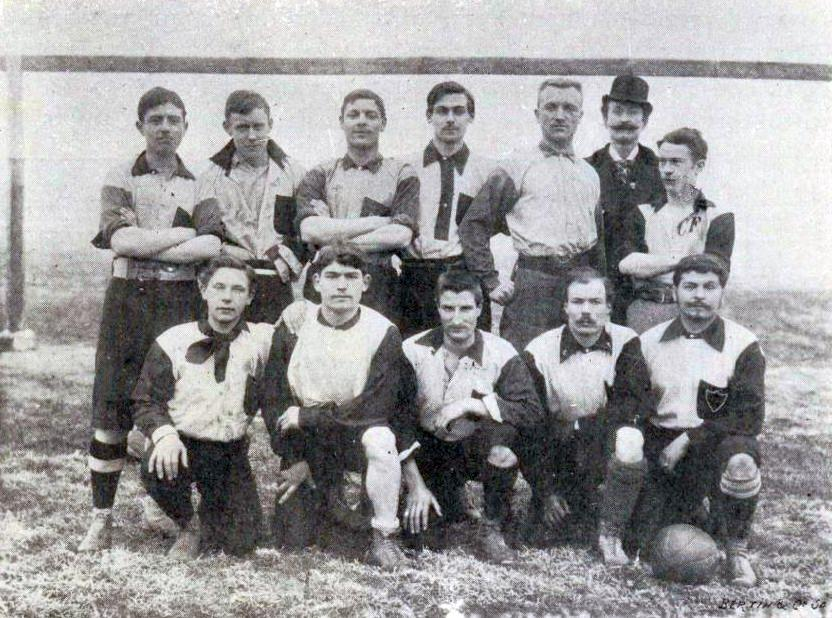
Lambert (standing, first from left) with Club Français at the Parc des Princes on 26 December 1897.

On 26 December 1897, Lambert started in the very first football match in the history of the Parc des Princes in front of 500 spectators, in which Club Français was defeated 1–3 by the English Ramblers. On 28 March 1898, he started in the 1898 Coupe Manier final at the Vélodrome de Vincennes, in which his "superb play" helped his side to a 10–0 win over Paris Star. In the following week, on 3 April, he started in the final of the 1898 USFSA Football Championship against Standard AC at Courbevoie, which ended in a 2–3 loss. In the following year, on 16 April 1899, he started in the play-off match against Standard AC to decide the 1898–99 USFSA Paris championship, which ended in a 3–2 win. This victory qualified the club to the 1899 USFSA national championship, in which Club Français withdrew from the final before facing Le Havre AC. Later that year, on 23 October, Lambert captained Club Français in the 1899 Coupe Manier final at Suresnes, helping his side to a 6–0 win over RC Roubaix.

Lambert was a member of the Club Français team that won the 1899–1900 USFSA Paris championship. On 29 April 1900, Lambert started in the final of the 1900 Challenge International du Nord in Tourcoing, which ended in a 2–3 loss to Le Havre AC. In the following week, on 6 May, he captained Club Français in another final against Le Havre AC, this time in the 1900 USFSA Football Championship, which ended in a 0–1 loss. Later that year, on 23 December, he started in the 1900 Coupe Manier final at Joinville, helping his side to a 1–0 win over UA I arrondissement.

=== International career ===
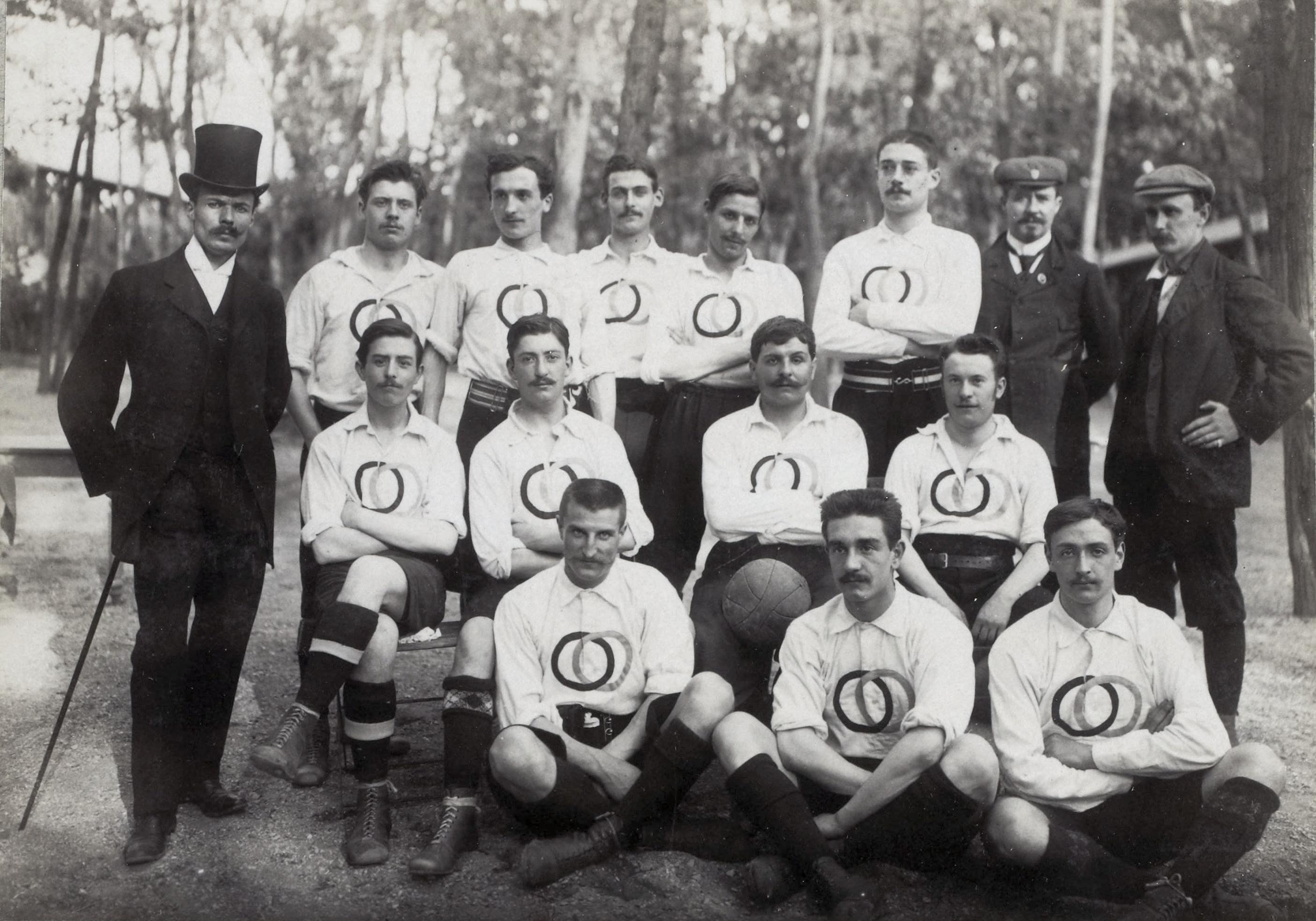
Lambert (2nd row, first from the left) with the French team at the 1900 Olympics.

Lambert was listed as a forward for the USFSA team at the 1900 Olympic Games. (Note: Some sources wrongly name him André or even Alexandre.) He was selected for both matches, which ended in a 0–4 loss to Upton Park on 20 September, and in a 6–2 win over a team representing Belgium three days later. The French team came second and Lambert was thus awarded with a silver medal.

== Honours ==
=== Club ===
Club Français

- USFSA Paris Championship:
  - Champions (2): 1898–99 and 1899–1900
- USFSA Football Championship:
  - Runner-up (3): 1898, 1899 and 1900
- Coupe Manier:
  - Champions (4): 1898, 1899, 1900, and 1902
- Challenge International du Nord:
  - Runner-up (1): 1900

=== International ===
France MNT

- Summer Olympics:
  - Silver medal (1): 1900
