= Georges Garnier =

French footballer (1878–1936)

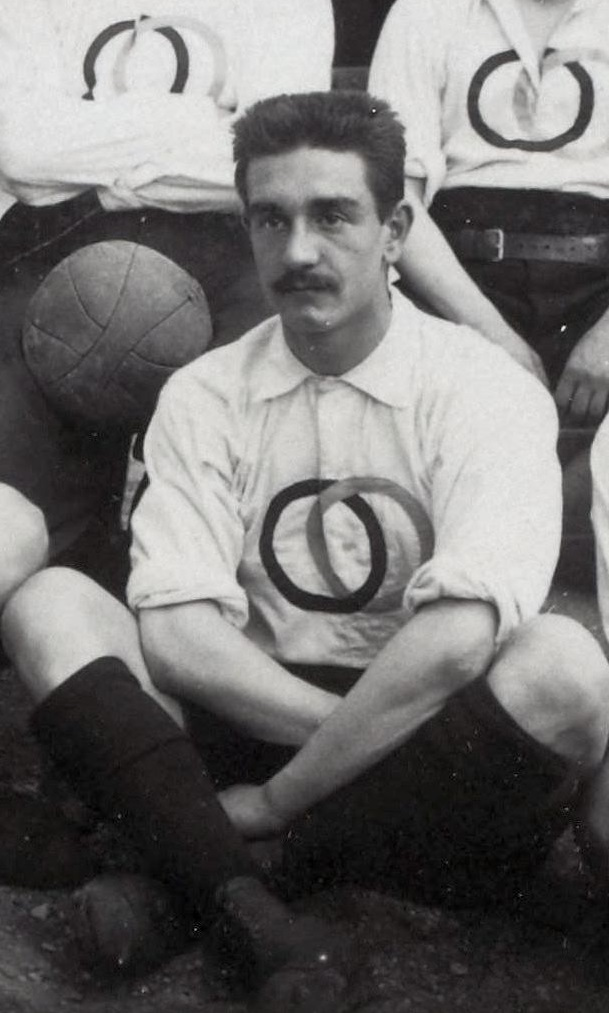
- Garnier at the 1900 Olympics

Personal information
- Full name: Jean Marie Georges Garnier
- Date of birth: 14 May 1878
- Place of birth: 6th arrondissement of Paris, France
- Date of death: 2 February 1936 (aged 57)
- Place of death: 10th arrondissement of Paris, France
- Position: Forward

Senior career*
Years	Team	Apps	(Gls)
1895–1897	Racing Club de France (athletics)		
1896–1901	Club Français		
1902	Stade Bordelais UC		
1902–1907	Club Français		
1907	Vieilles Gloires	+1	(0)

International career
1900	France (Olympic)	2	(0)
1904–1905	France (unofficial)	4	(1)
1904–1905	France	3	(0)
1905	Paris	1	(0)
Medal record
Men's football
Representing France
Football at the Summer Olympics
Silver medal – second place	1900 Paris	Team competition
- * Club domestic league appearances and goals

Jean Marie Georges Garnier (14 May 1878 – 2 February 1936) was a French footballer who played as a forward and won a silver medal on the USFSA at the 1900 Summer Olympics in the football tournament. The team was primarily made up of Club Français players.

He also played for France in 1904–05, making his debut at the age of 26, and thus being the oldest member who ever played for the Bleus.

== Early life ==
Georges Garnier was born in the 6th arrondissement of Paris on 14 May 1878, as the son of a baker, and together with the Huteau brothers and Fernand Canelle, he was a member of the small group of middle school students from the Lycée Chaptal who, in 1893, founded an unofficial club called the Etoile Sportive Parisiennne, which played on the pitch at the Château de Madrid in the Bois de Boulogne, and which was soon absorbed by Club Français, so called because it did not include any English players.

== Club career ==
=== Early career ===
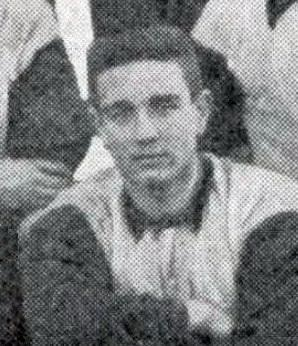
Garnier in 1896.

Club Français joined the USFSA in March 1894, and on 22 April of the same year, the 15-year-old Garnier played on the left wing in the semifinal of the inaugural USFSA championship, which ended in a 0–1 loss to The White Rovers. Together with Lucien Huteau, Marcel Lambert, Gaston Peltier, and captain Eugène Fraysse, Garnier was a starter in the Club Français team that won the 1896 USFSA Football Championship, doing so without losing a single match, and with Garnier netting 6 goals.

On 3 April 1898, he started in the final of the 1898 USFSA Football Championship against Standard AC at Courbevoie, which ended in a 2–3 loss. In the following year, on 16 April 1899, he started in the play-off match against Standard AC to decide the 1898–99 USFSA Paris Championship, scoring once in an eventual 3–2 win. This victory qualified the club to the 1899 USFSA national championship, in which Club Français withdrew from the final before facing Le Havre AC. Later that year, on 23 October, he started in the 1899 Coupe Manier final at Suresnes, helping his side to a 6–0 win over RC Roubaix.

=== 1899–1900 season ===
Together with Lambert, Peltier, and Fernand Canelle, Garnier was a member of the Club Français team that won the 1899–1900 USFSA Paris championship. On 29 April 1900, Garnier sustained an injury during the 1900 Challenge International du Nord final against Le Havre AC, so he changed to the position of goalkeeper, conceding a goal in extra-time in a 2–3 loss. He thus missed the final of the 1900 USFSA Football Championship on 6 May, which ended in another loss to Le Havre AC (0–1), partly because Club Français' "forward line was disorganized due to the absence of Garnier".

Later that year, on 23 December, Garnier started in the 1900 Coupe Manier final at Joinville, helping his side to a 1–0 win over UA I arrondissement. In the following week, on 31 December, in a match against Croydon FC, Garnier found the back of the net "30 metres from the goal", which was uncommon in a time when players used dribbling and short passes to bring the ball to 6 metres, in order to shoot at point-blank range.

=== Later career ===
In early 1902, Garnier intended to settle permanently in Bordeaux, playing a few games for the Stade Bordelais UC, but he ultimately decided to return to Paris. Outside of football, he was a modest office worker, becoming a fabric salesman, and on 4 February 1902, Garnier and Peltier had to leave the field during a match in order to catch a train back to work. In the following month, on 16 March, he refereed the final of the 1902 Coupe Dewar between Standard AC and United SC, which ended in a 1–0 win to the former. In the following month, on 6 April, he refereed another final, this time of the USFSA Paris Championship between RC France and United SC, which ended in a 2–0 win to the former.

On 4 January 1903, Garnier started in the final of the 1902 Coupe Manier at Le Vésinet, scoring a hat-trick to help his side to a 7–0 win over Olympique Lillois. His third goal was described as "Garnier seized the ball, dribbled, and after running the entire length of the field, scored another goal with an irresistible shot". Three months later, on 15 March, he started in the final of the 1903 Coupe Dewar against United SC, which ended in a 3–4 loss.

In 1905, Garnier was described as "the type of centre-forward, tall, with weight, distributing the play well and knowing how to shoot". He retired in 1905, at the age of 27, although he appeared on the fields sporadically in 1906 and even one last time in December 1907, aged 29. On 1 April 1907, the 29-year-old Garnier started a match for the so-called Vieilles Gloires ("Old Glories"), playing alongside several fellow former Club Français players, including two of its founders, Charles Bernat and Ernest Weber; they lost 4–1 to Old Etonians. A few days later, on 7 April, Garnier attended the final of the 1907 USFSA Football Championship between RC France and RC Roubaix, alongside other former CF players, such as Huteau, Bernat, and René Ressejac-Duparc.

== International career ==
=== Unofficial appearances ===
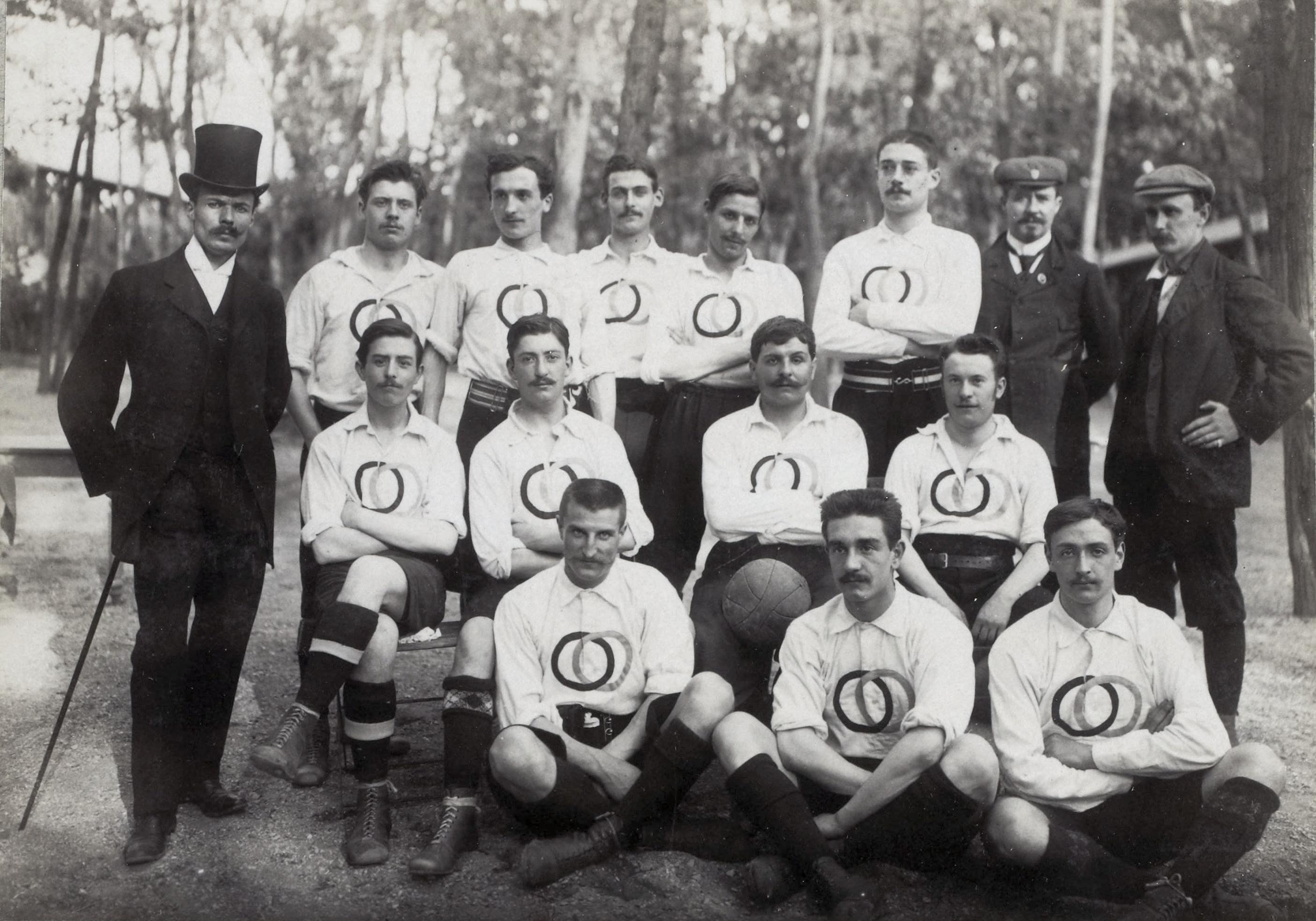
Garnier (seated on the floor, second from left) with the French team at the 1900 Olympics.

Garnier was listed as a forward for the USFSA team at the 1900 Olympic Games. He was selected for both matches, which ended in a 0–4 loss to Upton Park on 20 September, and in a 6–2 victory over Belgium, which was mostly made up of students from the French-speaking Université libre de Bruxelles. The French team came second and Garnier was thus awarded with a silver medal.

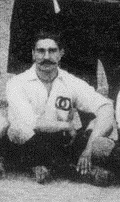
Garnier on his debut for France on 1 May 1904.

In 1903 and 1904, Garnier played three unofficial matches for France, namely against Corinthian (4–11), as well as Southampton twice (0–11, and 1–6), which was already a professional team at the time; he even scored a consolation goal against Corinthians at the Parc des Princes. The scale of the defeats did not ruin the enthusiasm, because the French then had the modesty to consider themselves as pupils of their British masters. On 7 March 1905, he played for a France XI (USFSA) in a friendly match against a London League XI, which ended in a 1–3 loss.

=== Official appearances ===
On 1 May 1904, Garnier was one of the eleven footballers who played in France's first-ever official match, a friendly cup match against Belgium at the Stade du Vivier d'Oie, providing an assist to Gaston Cyprès's 87th-minute equalizer to salvage a 3–3 draw. Aged 26, he was the oldest player in the French team, because at that time the practice of football concerned young people and often stopped with marriage, so he remains the earlier born player to have ever played for the Blues. He earned his final two international caps for France in 1905, in friendly matches against Switzerland and Belgium.

On 2 April 1905, the USFSA selected Garnier as the captain of the Paris football team in the very first Paris-Nord match (an annual test match for the French national team), helping his side to a 4–1 win.

== Athletic career ==
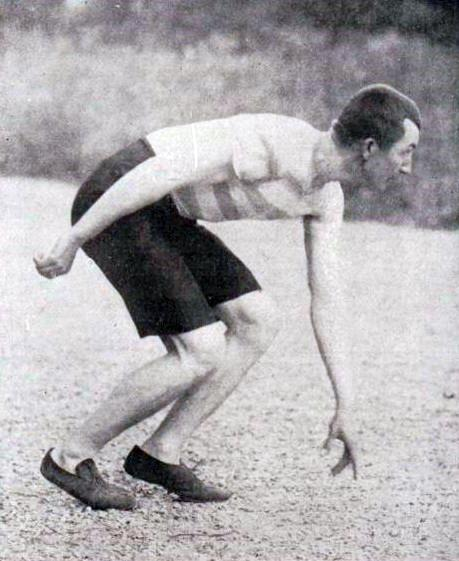
Georges Garnier (RCF), the 1897 French champion in the 800 meters.

Garnier was a member of Racing Club de France (athletics), being a French champion in the 400 metres in 1895 and the 800 metres in 1897, and winning the first edition of the Prix de France 1896 (200 metres flat of the RCF).

His brother André, also from the RCF, was French champion of the 100 meters in 1896 and vice-champion in 1897, as well as vice-champion of the 400 meters that year. They should not be confused with a Garnier of US Le Mans, active between 1903 and 1906 in the 400 meters hurdles, 110 meters hurdles, as well as in the pole vault.

== Death ==
Garnier, then an accountant, died in the 10th arrondissement of Paris on 2 February 1936, at the age of 57.

== Honours ==
Club Français

- USFSA Paris Championship: 1896, 1898–99, 1899–1900
- USFSA Football Championship: 1896; runner-up 1898, 1899, 1900
- Coupe Manier: 1897, 1898, 1899, 1900, 1902
- Challenge International du Nord runner-up: 1900

France

- Summer Olympics silver medal: 1900
