= Lucien Huteau =

French footballer (1878–1975)

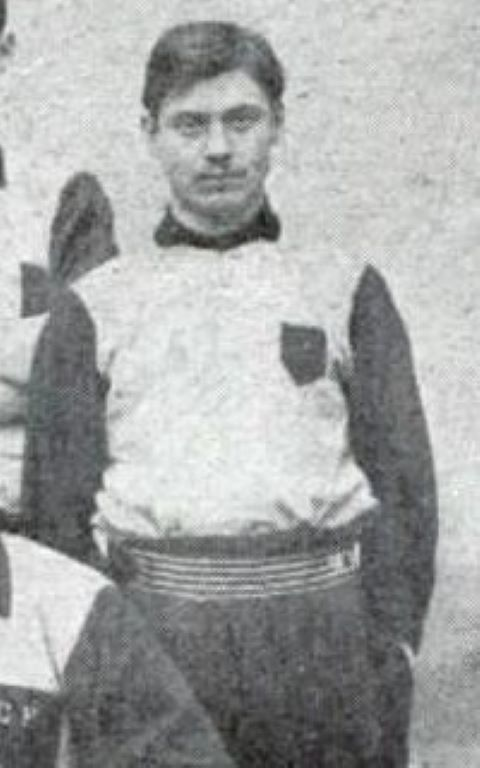
- Lucien Huteau in 1899

Personal information
- Full name: Lucien Paul Noël Huteau
- Date of birth: 26 May 1878
- Place of birth: Paris, France
- Date of death: 16 February 1975 (aged 96)
- Place of death: Ercuis, France
- Position: Goalkeeper

Senior career*
Years	Team	Apps	(Gls)
1893	Etoile Sportive Parisiennne		
1893–1900	Club Français		

International career
1900	France (Olympic)	2	(0)
Medal record
Men's football
Representing France
Football at the Summer Olympics
Silver medal – second place	1900 Paris	Team competition
- * Club domestic league appearances and goals

Lucien Paul Noël Huteau (26 May 1878 – 16 February 1975) was a French footballer who played as a goalkeeper and who competed in the football tournament at the 1900 Olympic Games in Paris, winning a silver medal as a member of the USFSA Olympic team representing France, which was primarily made up of Club Français players.

== Early life ==
Lucien Huteau was born in Paris on 26 May 1878, and together with his brother, Georges Garnier and Fernand Canelle, he was a member of the small group of middle school students from the Lycée Chaptal who, in 1893, founded an unofficial club called the Etoile Sportive Parisiennne, which played on the pitch at the Château de Madrid in the Bois de Boulogne, and which was soon absorbed by Club Français, so called because it did not include any English players. His father became the secretary of Club Français.

== Playing career ==
=== Club career ===
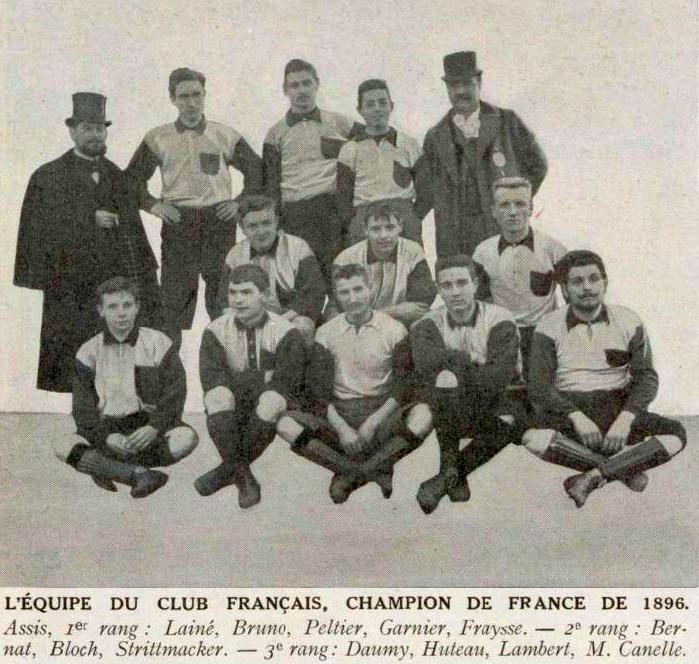
Huteau (standing, third from left) with the Club Français team that won the 1896 championship of France.

Club Français joined the USFSA in March 1894, and on 22 April of the same year, the 16-year-old Huteau started as a goalkeeper in the semifinal of the inaugural USFSA championship, which ended in a 0–1 loss to The White Rovers. Together with Marcel Lambert, Gaston Peltier, Georges Garnier, and captain Eugène Fraysse, Huteau was a starter in the Club Français team that won the 1896 USFSA Football Championship, doing so without losing a single match, and conceded just two goals in eight matches: one against Rovers (4–1 victory on 23 February) and one against Standard (4–1 victory on 15 March).

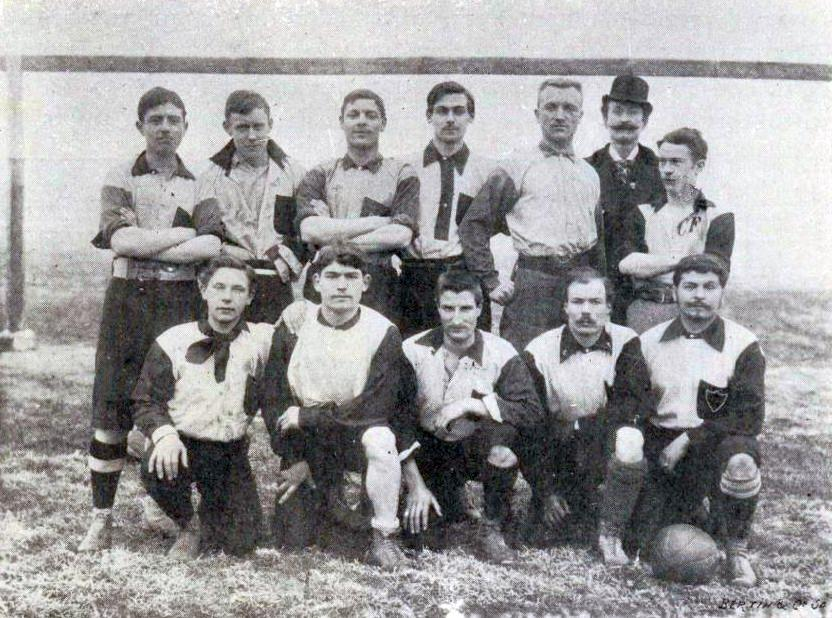
Huteau (standing, second from left) with Club Français at the Parc des Princes on 26 December 1897.

On 25 April, Huteau started in the final of the inaugural Coupe Manier against the newly crowded champions of France Standard AC, helping his side to a 4–3 win after extra-time. A few months later, on 26 December 1897, he started in the very first football match in the history of the Parc des Princes in front of 500 spectators, in which Club Français was defeated 1–3 by the English Ramblers. On 28 March 1898, he started for Club Français in the 1898 Coupe Manier final at the Vélodrome de Vincennes, helping his side to a 10–0 win over Paris Star. In the following week, on 3 April, he started in the final of the 1898 USFSA Football Championship against Standard AC at Courbevoie, which ended in a 2–3 loss. In the following year, on 16 April 1899, Huteau started in the play-off match against Standard AC to decide the 1898–99 USFSA Paris championship, helping his side to a 3–2 win. This victory qualified the club to the 1899 USFSA national championship, in which Club Français withdrew from the final before facing Le Havre AC. Later that year, on 23 October, he started in the 1899 Coupe Manier final at Suresnes, helping his side to a 6–0 win over RC Roubaix.

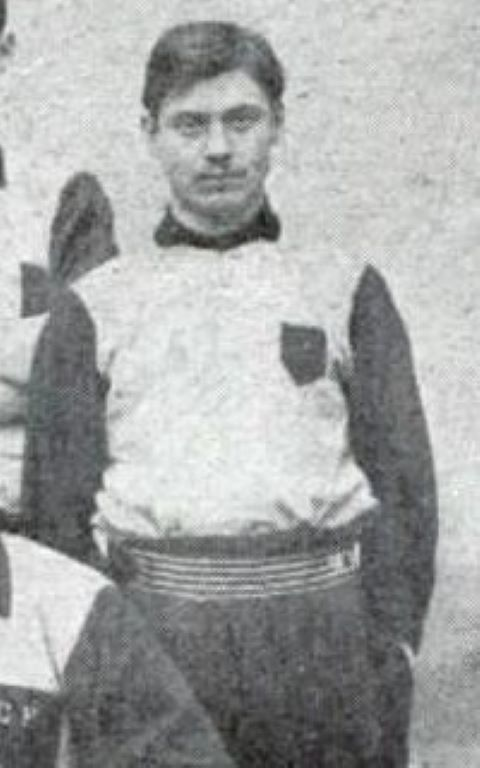
Huteau with Club Français in 1899.

Huteau was a member of the Club Français team that won the 1899–1900 USFSA Paris championship. On 29 April 1900, Huteau started as a goalkeeper in the final of the 1900 Challenge International du Nord against Le Havre AC, but following an injury on Garnier, they switched positions in an eventual 2–3 loss. In the following week, on 6 May, he started as a half-back in the 1900 USFSA Football Championship final against Le Havre AC, which ended in a 0–1 loss. Later that year, on 23 December, Huteau started in the 1900 Coupe Manier final against UA I arrondissement, and due to the absence of Laisné, Français played the entire first half with 10 men, but Huteau managed to stop every shot to keep the match tied. At half-time, they found a former CF player in the crowd, Ernest Weber, who was placed in goal, thus forcing Huteau to play the second half in the right wing, from where he helped his side to a 1–0 victory.

According to Reeves, captain of the West Norwood and Selhurst FC interviewed in October 1900, Huteau would have held his place very well in a great English team.

=== International career ===
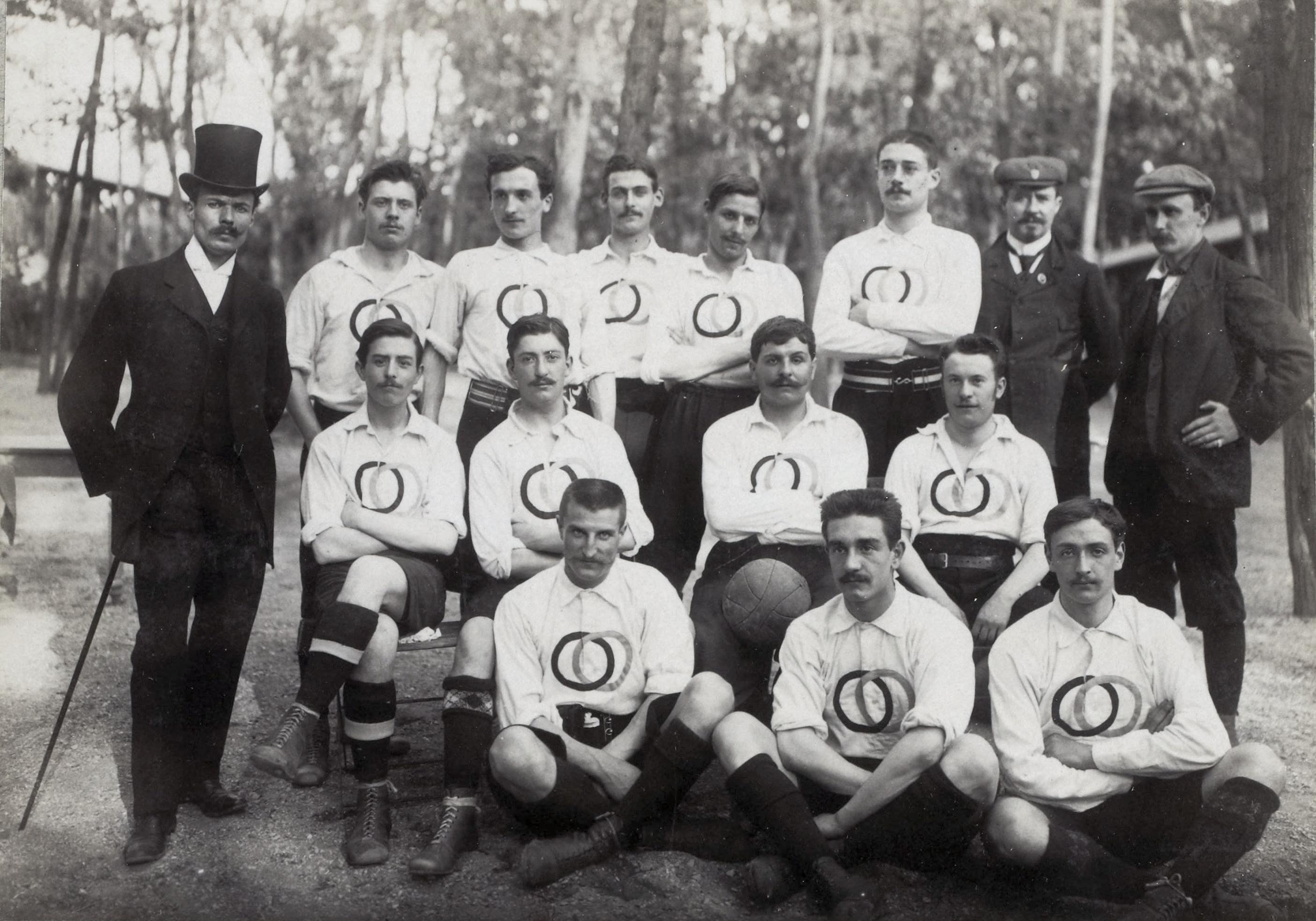
Huteau (standing, first from the left) with the French team at the 1900 Olympics.

Huteau was listed as a goalkeeper for the USFSA team at the 1900 Olympic Games. He was selected for both matches, which ended in a 0–4 loss to Upton Park on 20 September, and in a 6–2 victory over Belgium, which was mostly made up of students from the French-speaking Université libre de Bruxelles. The French team came second and Huteau was thus awarded with a silver medal.

== Later life ==
Having retired from the field in the early 1900s, Huteau and his father remained closely linked to football, attending the final of the 1907 USFSA Football Championship between RC France and RC Roubaix on 7 April, alongside other former CF players, such as Garnier and René Ressejac-Duparc. In the following month, on 9 May 1907, he attended André Billy's Paris-Nord meeting, which served as annual test matches for the French national team. Huteau was president of the Association Commission [football] of the Paris Committee for the 1908–09 season.

Recalled to military activity at the outbreak of the First World War, Huteau joined the 24th Territorial Infantry Regiment before moving to the 19th Train Squadron, seconded to the French military mission near the British Army as an interpreter. He was decorated with the Commemorative war medal and the Victory Medal.

== Honours ==
=== Club ===
Club Français

- USFSA Paris Championship:
  - Champions (2): 1898–99 and 1899–1900
- USFSA Football Championship:
  - Champions (1): 1896
  - Runner-up (3): 1898, 1899 and 1900
- Coupe Manier:
  - Champions (6): 1897, 1898, 1898–99, 1899, 1900, and 1902
- Challenge International du Nord:
  - Runner-up (1): 1900

=== International ===
France MNT

- Summer Olympics:
  - Silver medal (1): 1900
