= Georges Delolme =

Franco-English ice hockey player and footballer

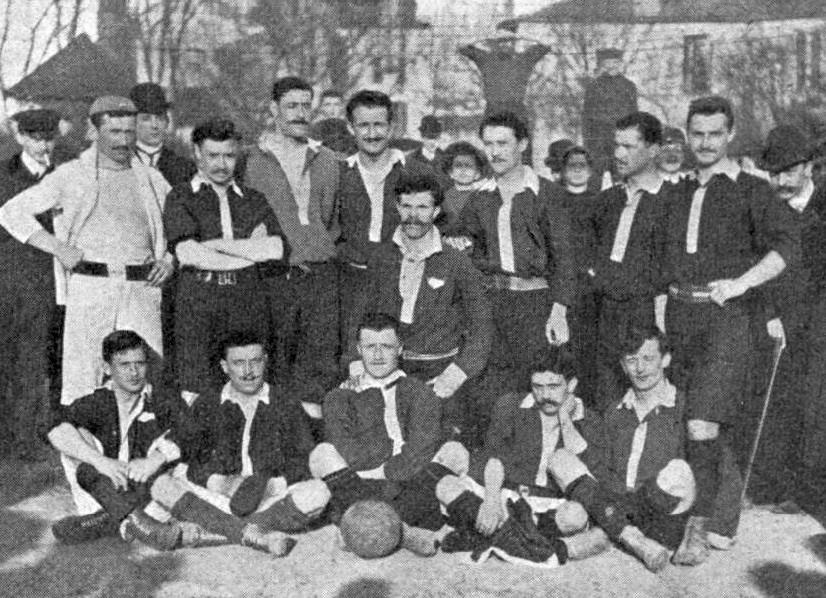
- Delolme with the CA Paris team that won the Coupe Manier in 1905.

Personal information
- Full name: Georges Frédéric Delolme
- Date of birth: 23 April 1878
- Place of birth: London, England
- Position: Forward

Senior career*
| Years | Team | Apps | (Gls) |
| 1894–1901 | UA I arrondissement | | |
| 1901–1907 | CA Paris | | |
- * Club domestic league appearances and goals

Georges Frédéric Delolme (23 April 1878 – unknown) was a Franco-English ice hockey player, and footballer who played as a forward for CA Paris in the early 21st century.

== Early years ==
Georges Delolme was born in London on 23 April 1878, as the son of a French sculptor, Georges Joseph Delolme (1843–1925), and Mary Ann Yates (1844–1913), an Englishwoman from Egham.

He had two younger sisters, Pauline Emilie (1880–?) and Louise Rose (1882–1965), and also two brothers, Claude and Harry. His father eventually moved to Charenton, where he settled as a sculptor, and all of his three sons decided to follow on his footsteps by opting for an artistic career, with Claude, Harry, and Georges becoming a designer, an ornamentalist, and a metal engraver respectively.

== Sporting career ==
=== UA 1er ===
In 1894, the Delolme brothers founded the Union Athlétique du 1er Arrondissement de Paris, a multi-sport club, and two years later, on 1 November 1896, Claude and Georges started for the first team of UA 1er in a match against its second team in Charenton. Two months later, in January 1897, a certain Delolme of U. A. 1er refereed a football match between The White Rovers and FEC Levallois.

Later that year, on 26 December 1897, the club assembled two ice hockey teams, made up of footballers, who competed 6 against 6, in which all three Delolme brothers played. In addition to his brief stint in hockey, his brother Claude was also a very prominent promoter of cricket in France, leading the USFSA's cricket section and being a member of the organizing committee for the 1900 Olympic Games in Paris, where together with Willan, he co-refereed the only cricket match in Olympic history between Great Britain and France.

In December 1900, Georges and his brother Harry played a crucial role in helping UA I arrondissement defeat Paris Star 4–1 in the semifinals of the Coupe Manier in 1900, thus reaching the final against Club Français in Joinville-le-Pont, and even though CF played the entire first half with 10 men, they still ultimately won 1–0.

=== CA Paris ===
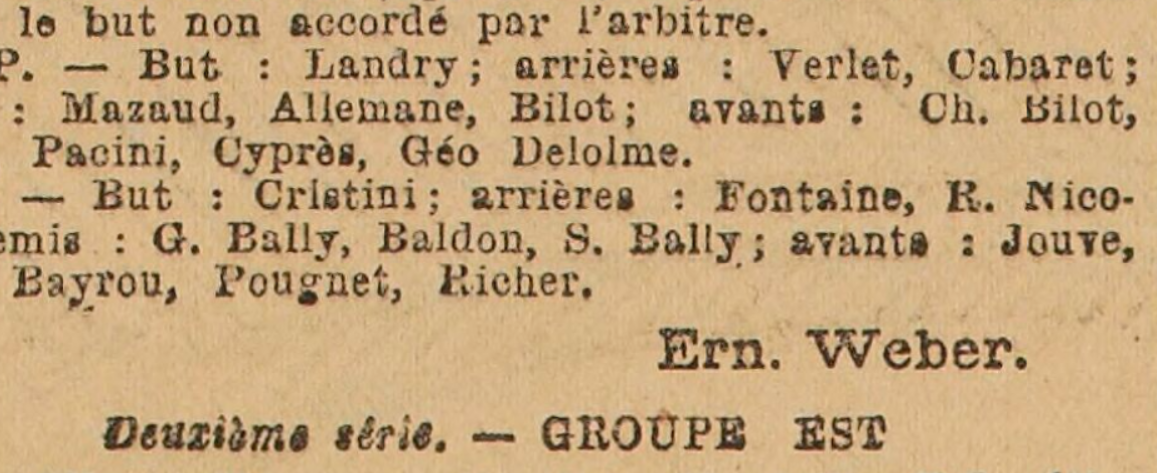
Delolme in the starting line-up of a CA Paris match in a L'Auto article of March 1904.

At some point in 1901, Delolme changed clubs, joining Nationale de Saint-Mandé, which later became FC Paris and then CA Paris, and on 2 March 1902, he started in the semifinals of the 1902 Coupe Dewar, which ended in a 3–1 loss to Standard AC. In November 1902, Delolme already was a regular in Mandé's attacking line, which included future internationals Louis Mesnier and Gaston Cyprès, and which was described in the local press as "the little red demons who form the forward line of the NSM are extraordinary: their passes executed at full speed raise thunderous applause".

Together with Henri Beau, Charles Bilot, Cyprès, and Mesnier, Delolme played a crucial role in the CA Paris team that won a three-peat of Coupe Manier titles from 1905 to 1907, beating Gallia Club 5–2 in the 1905 final, while the 1906 and 1907 titles were awarded to the team composed of at least eight French players with the highest ranking in the USFSA Paris championship, and in fact, CA Paris won that championship in 1906, and were runner-ups in 1907 behind RC de France, who did not meet the criteria for obtaining the trophy, so CA Paris therefore kept it. As the champions of Paris in 1906, CA Paris qualified for the USFSA national championship, and on 29 April, Delolme started in the final against RC Roubaix, in which he assisted Cyprès for the opening goal of the match in an eventual 1–4 loss. On 6 October 1905, he played in a USFSA Paris Championship match against Standard AC, which took place at the Charentonneau, and which was refereed by Robert Guérin, who at the time was the president of FIFA.

=== International career ===
On 1 May 1904, Delolme was considered to start in France's first-ever match, but he was unable to participate because he had been born in England, and had not yet opted for French nationality, so he was replaced by Roubaix's Emile Sartorius.

== Later life ==
In his military service file of 1917, Delolme was living at Charenton-le-Pont.

== Honours ==
UA I arrondissement

- Coupe Manier:
  - Runner-up (1): 1900

CA Paris

- USFSA Paris Championship:
  - Champions (1): 1905–06
- USFSA Football Championship:
  - Runner-up (1): 1906
- Coupe Manier:
  - Champions (3): 1905, 1906, and 1907
