= Ernest Weber (footballer) =

French author and sports journalist

- Born: 1877; Montmartre, Paris, France
- Died: 1945 (aged 67–68)
- Citizenship: French
- Occupations: Sports journalist; Author
- Known for: Journalist of L'Auto
Association football career
Senior career*
Years	Team	Apps	(Gls)
1892–1897	Club Français		
1900	Club Français	+1	(0)
1907	Vieilles Gloires	+1	(0)
Managerial career
- 1904–1906: France (assistant)
- * Club domestic league appearances and goals

Ernest Weber (1877 – 1945) was a French author and sports journalist, who was one of the most important figures in the amateur beginnings of football in Paris, co-founding several historic clubs in the French capital in the 1890s, such as Club Français in 1892 and Red Star in 1897, the latter with Jules Rimet, the future president of FIFA. As the star journalist of the French newspaper L'Auto in the early 20th century, he played a prominent role in promoting football in the country, but he is best known for being a very influential figure in the locker room of the French national team in its first years of existence. He was the author of one of only two chronicles relating France's inaugural match in 1904, the other being Robert Guérin, founder of FIFA.

== Early and personal life ==
Ernest Weber was born in Montmartre in 1877, but spent the better part of his childhood at Gros-Caillou, where his grandmother lived. He was the father of Jean Weber, a member of the Comédie-Française.

== Playing career ==
=== Club Français ===
Even though the official founders of Club Français were Eugène Fraysse and Charles Bernat, L'Auto stated in 1938 that "Arriving from England, where they had studied, 4 Frenchmen: Bernat, Fraysse, Mestre and Weber; in October 1892, the Club Français was born", which was the first club reserved exclusively for the French, hence the club's name. This means that he co-founded a club at the age of 15, which was common at the time, with Bernat being only a year older than him. Having been a former teammate of Fraysse, Weber described him years later as a "loud-mouthed, abrupt, violent", but also an exciting leader of men and a great team captain.

Despite not being a regular starter, Weber was a member of the CF squad that won the 1896 USFSA Championship, recalling years later that they had hoped for this victory to mean that "Standard AC had finally found its master", but "we soon had to become disillusioned" because Standard then won the 1897 title. On 1 November 1896, he started for CF in a match against Standard AC. Weber was still playing at Club Français in 1897, and even though the club was constantly changing fields, CF's position remained solid, even institutional, because many of its members were sitting on the USFSA Football Commission or ensuring media coverage like Weber or André Saint-Ignan.

=== Later career ===
Despite being three years younger than Jules Rimet, it was Weber who introduced football to the future president of FIFA, along with Charles de Saint-Cyr, a fellow journalist and former member of the Racing Club de France. On 21 February 1897, the 23-year-old Rimet gathered his circle of close friends at the sports café on rue de Grenelle in the 7th arrondissement of Paris, which included Weber and Saint-Cyr, along with his brother Modeste and his brother-in-law Jean de Pessac, and together, they founded the multi-sports club Red Star, with football gradually taking over all the activities offered. Despite still being in his early 20s, Weber seems to have never played for Red Star.

Three years later, Weber attended the final of the 1900 Coupe Manier on 23 December, which was contested by Club Français and UA I arrondissement in Joinville-le-Pont, with his former club playing the entire first half with 10 men because of a last-minute absence. During half-time, however, Gaston Peltier managed to find a former CF player among the many spectators, Weber, who was described in the press as "ancient" not because of his age, since he was still only 23, but because he had not played a single match for at least three years, since 1897. His long period of inactivity had naturally hindered his skills, thus only being able to play as goalkeeper, which forced Lucien Huteau to play the second half in the right wing; Club Français claimed the title with a 1–0 victory.

== Sports journalism ==
Weber wrote for several French newspapers, such as La Vie au grand air in the late 1890s, L'Auto (1904–08), and L'Intransigeant (1908–?). During the inaugural Tour de France in 1903, which was organized by L'Auto (the forerunner of L'Équipe), its circulation leapt from 25,000 to 65,000 copies sold per day, thus becoming one of the biggest daily newspaper in the country and the reference for sports news in France. Weber took advantage of such a platform to establish himself as one of the most influential figures in the world of French football at the time.

=== SEFA ===
"Our nationals will do better than a good showing against the English champions, against these famous professionals whose exploits have until now been somewhat legendary for us and who will finally become realities".

— Weber in the preview of France's matches against Southampton in March 1904.

Following the success of a match between a "mixed" French team and the English club Corinthian, a club specializing in European tours, a handful of patrons, including Weber, created an entity to repeat the effort, the so-called Société d’Encouragement Football Association (SEFA), an external body independent of the USFSA, the then sports governing body in France. Thanks to Weber, SEFA secured the financial support of L'Auto to welcome the English professional club Southampton for two international matches on 13 and 14 March 1904 at the Parc des Princes; it was then that USFSA's chairman, Robert Guérin, under the risk of giving up control of France's international matches to a parallel organisation, proposed to the Council of the USFSA to form the French national team itself, and therefore, the two French teams that faced Southampton were assembled by the USFSA and by FSAPF, instead of the SEFA, whose selectors included Weber and Jack Wood, a renowned football referee.

In the following month, on 16 April, SEFA assembled a French team to face Corinthians, which was welcomed to Paris by a reception committee that was made up of the most notable figures in French football at the time, including Weber, Gilon (SEFA), William Sleator (The White Rovers), Walter Hewson (Cook et Cie house), Philip Tomalin, Alfred Tunmer, Jack Wood, Shepherd (Williams house), Georges Duhamel, the Paris Committee of the USFSA, United SC, and the newspapers L'Auto and La Vie au grand air. In the preview of this match, Weber explained that SEFA's white shirt would be confused with the white of the Corinthians, so the French instead wore a black and gold striped shirt provided by the Williams house.

=== Influence at the inaugural match ===
In addition to Club Français, some sources have stated that Weber also played as a forward at United SC, a club of English and Swiss immigrants; (Note: For instance, on 6 March 1904, in a 2nd series match of the USFSA Paris championship between the second teams of United SC and Racing Club de France, Weber scored his side's only goal in a 1–3 loss.) (Note: Furthermore, one source also stated that at some point before becoming a columnist for L'Auto, Weber also played for Stade Français, which was most likely an error from a confusion with Club Franças.) however, this Weber was a different person, because on 1 May 1904, while the player was helping United SC, the champions of the USFSA, to a 5–1 win over Étoile des deux lacs, the champions of the FGSPF, the journalist was in Brussels, as the correspondent for L'Auto in the inaugural match of the French national team against Belgium, so he could write the technical summary of the game, which was published the next day. For many years, this short article from Weber was commonly accepted as the only source of reference relating France's debut, until another report was found in 2020, in a non-sports daily newspaper, La Presse, under the signature "OFF-SIDE", which was the pseudonym of Robert Guérin, founder of FIFA. Guérin referred to this match as France's "official" debut, as part of the creation of FIFA, hence why Guérin did not allow SEFA to intervene in this match; however, France's inaugural team included seven of the players who faced Corinthians in April, most of which had been selected by Weber and Wood, so even though Guérin chose the players without their help, he still validated some of their previous choices.

In his chronicle, Weber had to arrange fake names for both Louis Mesnier (Didi) and Fernand Canelle (Fernand) in order to make their presence more discreet, because even though the army had granted them 48-hour leaves, those leaves did not include crossing borders. Furthermore, Weber also had to manage last-minute withdrawals; for instance, he temporarily concealed the news about the withdrawals of Pierre Allemane and Charles Wilkes, releasing this information only on the following day, so as "not to worry our internationals", thus demonstrating his predilection for psychologic tactics. Despite the withdrawals, the French squad arrived in Brussels with 12 men, and after much discussion between the players, Guérin, and Weber, it all came down to a coin toss between Jacques Davy and Emile Fontaine, which was won by the former, while the latter was never able to become an international. Before the match, Weber and Guérin boosted the morale of the players, instilling in them the desire to save national honour, because "we have, in fact, to defend our colours"; the match ended in a 3–3 draw, and Weber was amazed that both teams enjoyed it.

=== Assistant manager of the French national team ===
Weber was once again the correspondent for L'Auto' in the second and third match of France's history, both in 1905, against Switzerland in February at the Parc des Princes, in which he stated that "Association football, a sport little known to the general public, has just asserted itself once again", and against Belgium in May, again in Brussels, in which he heavily criticized the pitch, which had been affected by heavy rain, describing it as "more of a swamp than a football ground" and that "on such a ground, one should rather play water polo than football.

Following Guérin's withdrawal in early 1906, the helm of the national team was given to André Billy and André Espir, and when they made their debut in a friendly against Belgium on 22 April, they asked Weber for help, since he was the only one from that trio who had watched the previous two Franco-Belgian meetings, thus having a valuable input, and indeed, Weber had noted that Belgian's full-back Edgard Poelmans constantly delivered precise passes to his forwards, so he had the idea of intercepting them, an excellent avant-garde idea that never came to fruition because the captain of the French team, Pierre Allemane, forgot to give France's winger Raymond Jouve the instructions he had received from either Weber or Espir: to mark and hinder Poelmans; France lost 0–5. If this had been done, Jouve would have become the first international player theoretically responsible for applying individual gegenpressing, a first in terms of tactics.

In France's next match against Belgium on 21 April 1907, at Uccle, he praised the debutant Georges Bon for pressing the opponents despite being a forward, because back then the forwards did not carry out defensive work. Two weeks prior, the national coach André Billy had postponed his infamous Nord-Paris meeting, which served as annual test match for the French national team, in order to focus on Belgium, a decision criticized by Weber, who wrote in L'Auto that "the Belgium-France match has already been played three times without any stake, and still became a classic, so the Paris-Nord match might become one as well". At the end of that month, Weber and Billy had another quarrel after the former criticized the performance of the club that the latter presided (Olympique Lillois) in the final of the 1907 Coupe Dewar on 28 April, (Note: Weber stated that Lillois had a slow and weak start, so the opponents did the same "probably out of politeness", with "the second half resuming with as much sluggishness as the first", and also that OM "did not attempt any attack; it was of a desperate monotony".) which is probably why Billy never again allowed Weber to be present in the locker room of the national team.

=== Criticism of Bayrou and Gallia ===
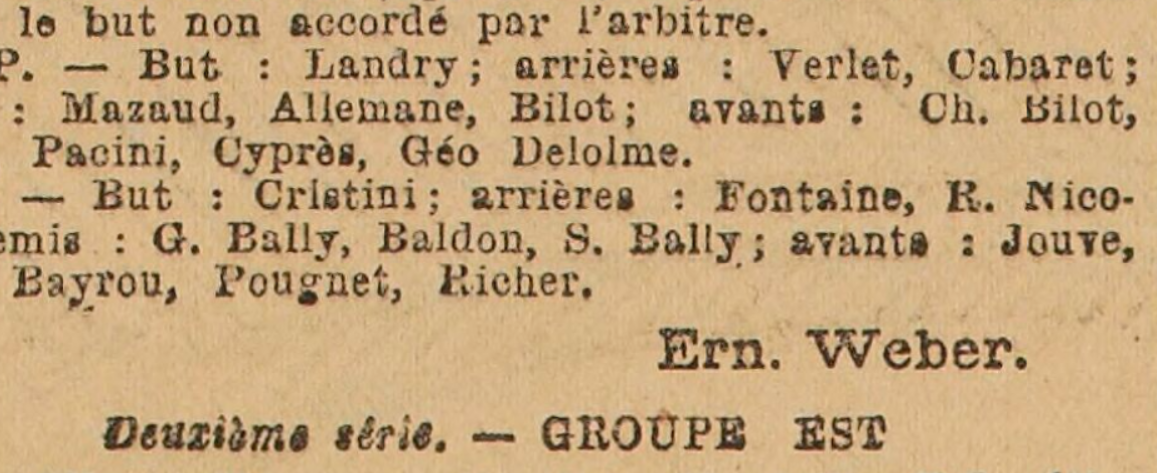
Weber's typical signature in L'Auto in March 1904, for an article about a match of Gallia, which fielded the likes of Bayrou and Jouve.

Throughout his journalistic career, Weber developed dissatisfaction with some players, most notably the French international Georges Bayrou, describing him as a player who "produces, at first sight, a deplorable effect: disheveled as desired, falls often and gets up slowly, thus being on the ground as often, if not more, than standing, he seems the accomplished type of the idiot". In 1905, Bayrou captained his side Gallia Club to a triumph in the final of the 1905 USFSA Football Championship, but Weber was not gentle in describing this victory snatched with a goal from Raymond Jouve in the 118th minute: "Two hours! during which we saw 20 men running after the ball, kicking it, and... that's it!". In the following year, on 6 May, Gallia lost the final of the 1906 Coupe Dewar to RC France, and Weber was once again harsh on them, stating that "for those who came with the sole desire to attend a good game, they had only rare opportunities to show themselves satisfied", and added that France's 0–5 defeat to Belgium two weeks earlier was "far more interesting".

A few months later, in October 1906, Weber wrote in L'Auto that "For a long time I criticized the game of the Gallia Club, so strongly that I was accused of bias, but actually, I did not like their game because it is made of jolts, thrusts, endurance, and ardor", but he then confessed to being wrong since "those who show calm, precise preparation, are the result of skill or strength, and not of nervousness or lack of courage". He then proceeded to show his impartiality, stating that "after having attacked the Gallia, when it was victorious, I will now sing its praises, even if it knows defeat", going on to describe the qualities of Gallia's squad, including Bayrou, stating that "he catches up when he is balanced on his feet", and "easy to recognize on a playing field: he is the most... least elegant you can see".

=== Support of amateurism and the FGSPF ===
Like many other members of the USFSA, Weber advocated maintaining complete amateurism, so he actively fought against "brown amateurism", which was the illegal payment of an officially amateur athlete, by denouncing such cases, and likewise, in the summer of 1906, the growing fame of René Camard, then in the 2nd series of the USFSA Paris championship, had earned him requests from several first-division clubs, which attempted to attract him in exchange for benefits, so when Camard's hesitation became public knowledge, Weber publicly criticized him of selling his services to the highest bidder.

At the time, the USFSA was competing with several rival federations, most notably Charles Simon's FGSPF, but this never stopped Weber from publicly showing his support towards the FGSPF, which was made up of catholic patronages that were reigned by complete amateurism. For instance, in October 1906, the Paris Committee of the USFSA reminded clubs that they must request the requalification of people who have been part of other federations (mainly the FGSPF) before asking for their admission to the USFSA, but Weber called them out and wrote that this official statement was just a "good trick on the FGSPF". A few days later, Simon, the president of the FGSPF, visited the L'Auto newsroom to thank him, stating that the "ridiculous decision affecting the members of other federations made by the leaders of the Paris Committee has no value since it does not come from the power leaders of the USFSA", to which Weber later wrote that "we do not defend ourselves against those against whom we do not fear".

Just three months later, in January 1907, several journalists discredited and mocked an FGSPF team, made up of the best players from the patronages, during the preview of a friendly match against North London AFC; Weber condoned these comments as "Pestilence!", stating that "this is an opinion that smacks of blind fanaticism. I apologize for such boldness, but I wish the best teams of the USFSA to have such a team, where even the worst player shows a rare discipline and joy". The French team ended up winning 4–2, with Weber blaming this result on the English forward line being too individualistic, stating that "perhaps they had been assured that in France, the columnists mainly sing the praises of individuals and they were looking to be mentioned. Disillusions!".

=== Football historian ===
"Just as history does not know the name of the head of the supply service who gave a general-in-chief the means to win a battle, our current footballers do not know the names of the first masters of our current stars".

— Weber reminiscing about the founders of Club Français and their current impact (1907).

On 24 March 1907, Weber wrote an article titled Vieilles Gloires ("Old Glories"), where he detailed several aspects of the final of the 1897 USFSA Football Championship, in which Standard AC defeated The White Rovers 3–2, including a previously unknown fact: The final was a replay, with the first match having been canceled because the referee was English. This fact remained uncontested until 1959, over half a century later, when Georges Duhamel published his book Le football français, ses début, in which he recounts this episode without giving details on the reasons for the cancellation of the first play-off. In this article, Weber also stated that just as Charles Brennus is recognized as the "father of rugby", the president of Standard Philip Tomalin "deserves that the French players award him the title of father of association football".

In April 1907, on the occasion of a match involving Vieilles Gloires ("Old Glories"), Weber stated that the first players of Club Français "produced a beautiful series of efforts, showed a magnificent disinterested ardor, who ensured the success of association football from its beginnings in France". He then added that "it is important, from time to time, to fix certain points of history and to drop the legends presented by certain historiographers whose memory is unfaithful or whose information is doubtful".

=== Other commentaries ===
At that time, football was mainly practiced by young people and often stopped with marriage, and thus, in 1905, Weber created the category of Vieux débris ("Old debris"), reserved for those over 25 years old, and Guérin even created a club of Vieux Débris in Paris, which featured some international players, such as Maurice Guichard and Georges Garnier; nowadays, this category would only fit for those around 35. In October 1907, Weber described the 28-year-old Fernand Desrousseaux as "the oldest footballer in the North", but also added that "his presence of mind and his skill makes him one of the best goalkeepers in the North". On 1 April 1907, the 30-year-old Weber put on his boots again to play for the so-called Vieilles Gloires, playing alongside several former fellow Club Français players, as well as fellow CF co-founder Charles Bernat; they lost 4–1 to Old Etonians. In the chronicle of this match, Weber, who was described as "the father of Vieuix Débris", was reported to have enjoyed "the success of this day, which will be annual and thus certainly provoke the return to sport of more people who considered themselves too old".

In the final of the 1906 USFSA Football Championship in April, which saw RC Roubaix defeat CA Paris (4–1), Weber wrote in L'Auto that the result "crowned a season of hard work where composure, calm, and just self-confidence were essential", and also that "we will listen as appropriate to the excuses that the Parisians will give for their defeat". In February 1907, CA Paris won its third consecutive Coupe Manier, thus earning the right to permanently keep the trophy, so Weber announced the club's intentions to do so, while pointed out that "the more generous Club Français had previously renounced its right of ownership", having won this tournament five times in a row at the turn of the century.

On 2 June 1907, two days after the general meeting of The Football Association in which it was decided that a new and separate organization must be created for amateur football (Amateur Football Alliance), Weber wrote a small article about this situation, stating "we cannot logically admit another English federation to FIFA, which means that the amateurs of continent[al Europe] won't be able to play against the English amateurs. How fun that will be!". This was most likely a reference to an international match held the previous year, on 1 November 1906, in which France, then made up of amateur players, was trashed by England Amateurs by a score of 0–15, with Weber then writing on the following day that "the English played as they should, that is to say, superbly”.

Relying only on the appearance of his signature in the columns of L'Auto, Weber stayed there from 1904 until as late as February 1908.

== Writing career ==
In addition to being a sports journalist, Weber also wrote and published several sports books before the First World War, including two in 1905, such as Sports athlétiques, which was prefaced by Henri Desgrange and published by Éditions Garnier Frères, and four years later, in 1909, he published the Spanish version of this book (Sports atléticos). In 1913, Weber published a further two books, L'Entraînement à tous les sports ("Training for all sports") and Aéroplanes et hydroaéroplanes ("Aeroplanes and hydroaeroplanes").

In 1908, Weber and Henri Sonnet, a fellow journalist, published a work listing all the sports records called Les Tablettes Sportives, which was very well received by Frantz Reichel of Le Figaro, who described it as "a booklet of undeniable utility for all sportsmen", and also by Maurice Chérié of L'Aurore, who stated that Weber and Sonnet "grouped the documents briefly and clearly, classified in a simple and logical order, finally sifted through with rigorous accuracy".

After the War, a certain "E. Weber" wrote A Quoi Jouons Nous? ("What are we playing?"), a children's book of 68 pages full of watercolor drawings by Robert Salles, and published by the Librairie Garnier Freres in the 1920s.

== Death ==
Weber died in 1945, at the age of either 67 or 68.

== Works ==
- L'athlétisme par Ernest Weber (1900)
- Sports athlétiques (1905)
- Le Basket-ball, le base-ball, la crosse, le hockey, le golf, la longue paume, le jeu de paume, la pelote basque, le badminton, le cricket, la thèque, le croquet (1905)
- Aéroplanes et hydroaéroplanes (1913)
- L'Entraînement à tous les sports (1913)

== Honours ==
Club Français

- USFSA Football Championship:
  - Champions (1): 1896
- Coupe Manier:
  - Champions (1): 1900

== Bibliography ==
- Sorez, Julien (2013). Le football dans Paris et ses banlieues [Football in Paris and its suburbs] (in French). Paris: Presses universitaires de Rennes. p. 410. ISBN 978-2-7535264-3-3.
- Duhamel, Georges (1959). Le football français: ses débuts [French football: its beginnings] (in French). Paris: Imprimerie de la Charente. p. 80.
