= Fernand Canelle =

French footballer (1882–1951)

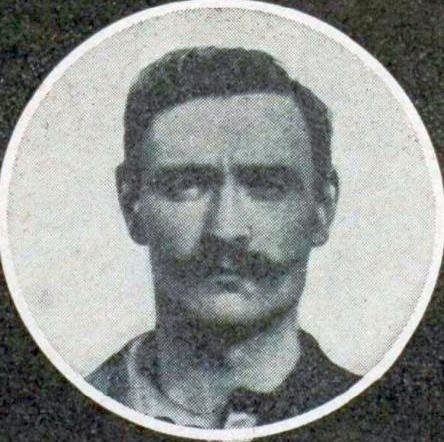
- Canelle circa 1913

Personal information
- Full name: Fernand Émile Canelle
- Date of birth: 2 January 1882
- Place of birth: 17th arrondissement of Paris, France
- Date of death: 11 September 1951 (aged 69)
- Place of death: Rueil-Malmaison, France
- Height: 1.70 m (5 ft 7 in)
- Positions: Forward; defender

Youth career
- 1893: Etoile Sportive Parisiennne
- 1893–1894: Club Français

Senior career*
Years	Team	Apps	(Gls)
1894–1896	West Norwood		
1896–1913	Club Français		

International career
1900	France (Olympic)	2	(0)
1902–1904	France (unofficial)	4	(0)
1902–1905	Paris	2	(0)
1904–1908	France	6	(0)
Medal record
Men's association football
Representing France
Olympic Games
Silver medal – second place	1900 Paris	Team competition
- * Club domestic league appearances and goals

Fernand Émile Canelle (2 January 1882 – 11 September 1951) was a French footballer who played as a forward and later as a defender for Club Français. He competed in the football tournament at the 1900 Olympic Games in Paris, winning a silver medal as a member of the USFSA Olympic team representing France, which was primarily made up of Club Français players.

He also played six matches for the official French national team between 1904 and 1908.

== Early life and education ==
Fernand Canelle was born in the 17th arrondissement of Paris on 2 January 1882, and together with Georges Garnier and the Huteau brothers, he was a member of the small group of middle school students from the Chaptal college who, in 1893, founded an unofficial club called the Etoile Sportive Parisiennne, which was presided by Canelle's father, Lucien, and which was soon absorbed by Club Français, so called because it did not include any English players.

In the mid-1890s, the 13-year-old Canelle received one of the scholarships that the Paris City Council awarded to finance language study trips in England, so even though he had acquired his practice of the game at Etoile, it was across the Channel where he developed his game, and even trained with the London-based clubs Selhurst and West Norwood, where he mastered the so-called ABCs of technique, so when he returned to his homeland, he was constantly described as a far more advanced and superior player than his fellow countrymen. According to Reeves, captain of the Norwood and Selhurst Football Club interviewed in October 1900, he was one of the best French forwards.

== Club career ==
=== Early career ===
In July and October 1896, the 14-year-old Canelle was playing in the second team of Club Français, making his debut for the first team during their triumphant campaign at the 1897 Coupe Manier, which required clubs to field only three foreigners during a time where the majority of Parisian clubs had ten, or even eleven. In the Coupe Manier final, CF defeated the newly crowded champions of France Standard AC by the score of 4–3 after extra-time; the local press stated that "Canelle was one of those who played the best", and "takes a definitive place as of today in the first team".

He only became a consistent starter for Club Français in 1898, breaking through as an attacking winger thanks to his speed, energy, and his lighter build of only 1.69 meters tall and weigh of about 70 kilos.

=== National dominance ===
On 16 April 1899, Canelle started in the play-off match against Standard AC to decide the 1898–99 USFSA Paris Championship, helping his side to a 3–2 win. This victory qualified the club to the 1899 USFSA national championship, in which Club Français withdrew from the final before facing Le Havre. Later that year, on 23 October 1899, Canelle started as a forward for Club Français in the 1899 Coupe Manier final at Suresnes, scoring the opening goal in an eventual 6–0 win over RC Roubaix.

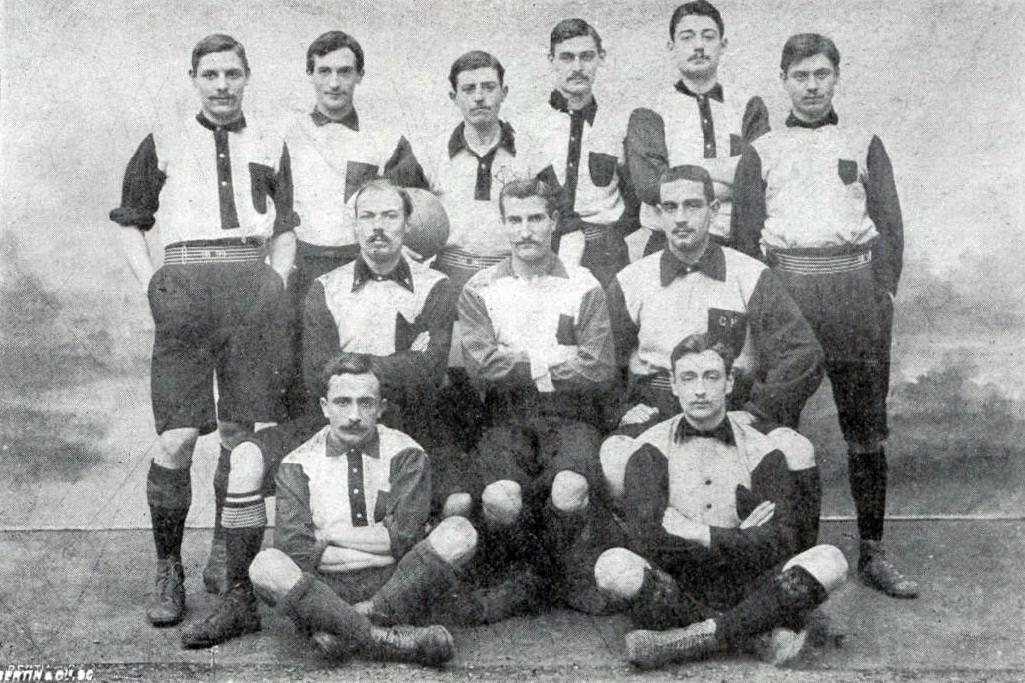
Canelle (seated on flor, right) with Club Français in 1899

Together with Garnier, Gaston Peltier, and Marcel Lambert, Canelle was a member of the Club Français team that won the 1899–1900 USFSA Paris championship. On 29 April 1900, Canelle started in the 1900 Challenge International du Nord final in Tourcoing, scoring a consolation goal in a 3–2 loss to Le Havre. In the following week, on 6 May, he started as a forward in another final against Le Havre AC, 1900 USFSA Football Championship, this time losing 1–0. Later that year, on 23 December, Garnier started in the final of the 1900 Coupe Manier at Joinville, helping his side to a 1–0 win over UA I arrondissement.

=== Later career ===
As early as 1901, Canelle began to abandon the wings, and started pairing in the back with the Belgian Alfred Bloch, or Pierre Allemane, and from 1903 onwards, he was systematically found at full-back, but despite his positional change, he was still selected.

On 4 January 1903, Canelle started in the final of the 1902 Coupe Manier at Le Vésinet, helping his side to keep a clean-sheet in a 7–0 win over Olympique Lillois. Three months later, on 15 March, he started as a defender in the final of the 1903 Coupe Dewar against United SC, but despite "a superb line clearance just a meter from his goal", CF lost 4–3.

Following an injury in October 1908, Canelle retired from football, although he kept making a few sporadic appearances, such as playing in goal for an inferior team of the Club Français in 1910, at the age of 28. In late 1910, he was sometimes playing as a goalkeeper, being described as "very skillful with his hands". Canelle was initially meant to start the final of the 1912 Coupe Dewar at Colombes on 14 April, but was eventually replaced by Bos; CF lost 3–1 to RC France. He was still playing for Club Français as late as May 1913, in which the 31-year-old Canelle was described as still being one of the best players in his position.

== International career ==
=== Unofficial appearances ===
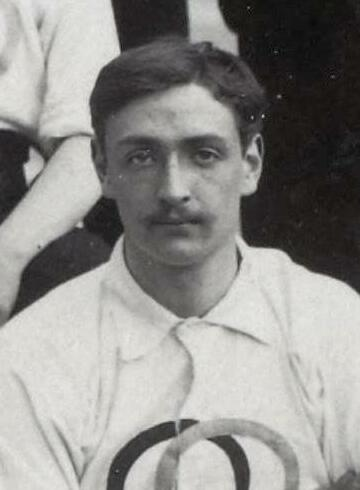
Canelle with the French team at the 1900 Olympics

Canelle was listed as a forward for the USFSA team at the 1900 Olympic Games. He was selected for both matches, which ended in a 4–0 loss to Upton Park on 20 September, and in a 6–2 victory over Belgium, which was mostly made up of students from the French-speaking Université libre de Bruxelles. The French team came second and Canelle was thus awarded with a silver medal.

In 1902, Canelle played as a forward for a Paris XI that faced Marlow F.C. in England, which ended in a 4–0 loss.

In 1904, Canelle, now a defender, played three unofficial matches for France, namely against Corinthian (11–4 loss), as well as Southampton twice (11–0 and 6–1 losses), which was already a professional team at the time. In the latter match, he played as a full-back, the exact same position as Southampton's team captain George Molyneux, who after the match declared "Your best player is, without a doubt, Canelle". On 2 April 1905, he again played for Paris, this time in the very first Paris-Nord match (an annual test match for the French national team), helping his side to a 4–1 win. A few years later, in 1908, the 26-year-old Canelle, who was already called a veteran, was described by Molyneux as "an impeccable player, a perfect shooter, adept at all the subtleties of the clearance game".

=== Official appearances ===
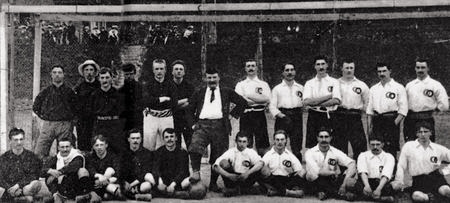
Canelle (standing, first player in a white jersey) making his debut for France on 1 May 1904

On 1 May 1904, the 22-year-old Canelle was the captain of France in their first-ever official match, a friendly cup match against Belgium at the Stade du Vivier d'Oie, which ended in a 3–3 draw. He was also France's captain in its next two matches, leading the Blues to their first-ever victory, against Switzerland (1–0) on 12 February 1905, and to their first-ever defeat, against Belgium on 7 May, in which he become the team's goalkeeper after replacing Georges Crozier, who was forced to leave his teammates during the match, which ended in a 7–0 loss.

In 1906, Canelle his fourth international cap in a friendly match against England amateurs on 1 November, conceding a penalty kick on an unintentional handball, but Vivian Woodward intentionally pulls it wide. In total, Canelle made six appearances for the France national team from 1904 to 1908, and he was set to represent France in the football tournament at the 1908 Olympic Games in London, but an injury in October prevented him from doing so.

== Journalist ==
Canelle was also educated, and he wrote and published a series of articles in the French newspaper L'Auto, including a chronicle of the 1907 match against Belgium, where he praised his teammate Georges Bon, but most notably, to explain how offside worked (9 November 1905), or to analyze the play of the defender (19 November 1908). In 1907, he co-wrote, with Fernand Bidault, a book entitled: La stratégie du Football-Association.

== Later life ==
When his father Lucien died in 1905, he took over the presidency of the Club Français and ran it with the help of Charles Bernat until the outbreak of the First World War in 1914. In 1932, Bernat wanted to try the adventure of professionalism, but Canelle refused and remained faithful to his English training, a fierce supporter of complete amateurism.

Canelle devoted himself, always voluntarily, within the framework of the FFF commissions, helping to create a French corporate cup, as well as international matches, from 1926 onwards.

Outside of football, he was a sales employee and jewelry representative.

== Death ==
Canelle died in Rueil-Malmaison on 11 September 1951, at the age of 69.

== Honours ==
Club Français

- USFSA Paris Championship: 1898–99, 1899–1900
- USFSA Football Championship runner-up: 1899, 1900
- Coupe Manier: 1899, 1900, 1902
- Challenge International du Nord runner-up: 1900
- Coupe Dewar runner-up: 1903

France

- Summer Olympics silver medal: 1900
