= Charles Brennus =

French engraver and sports leader (1859–1943)

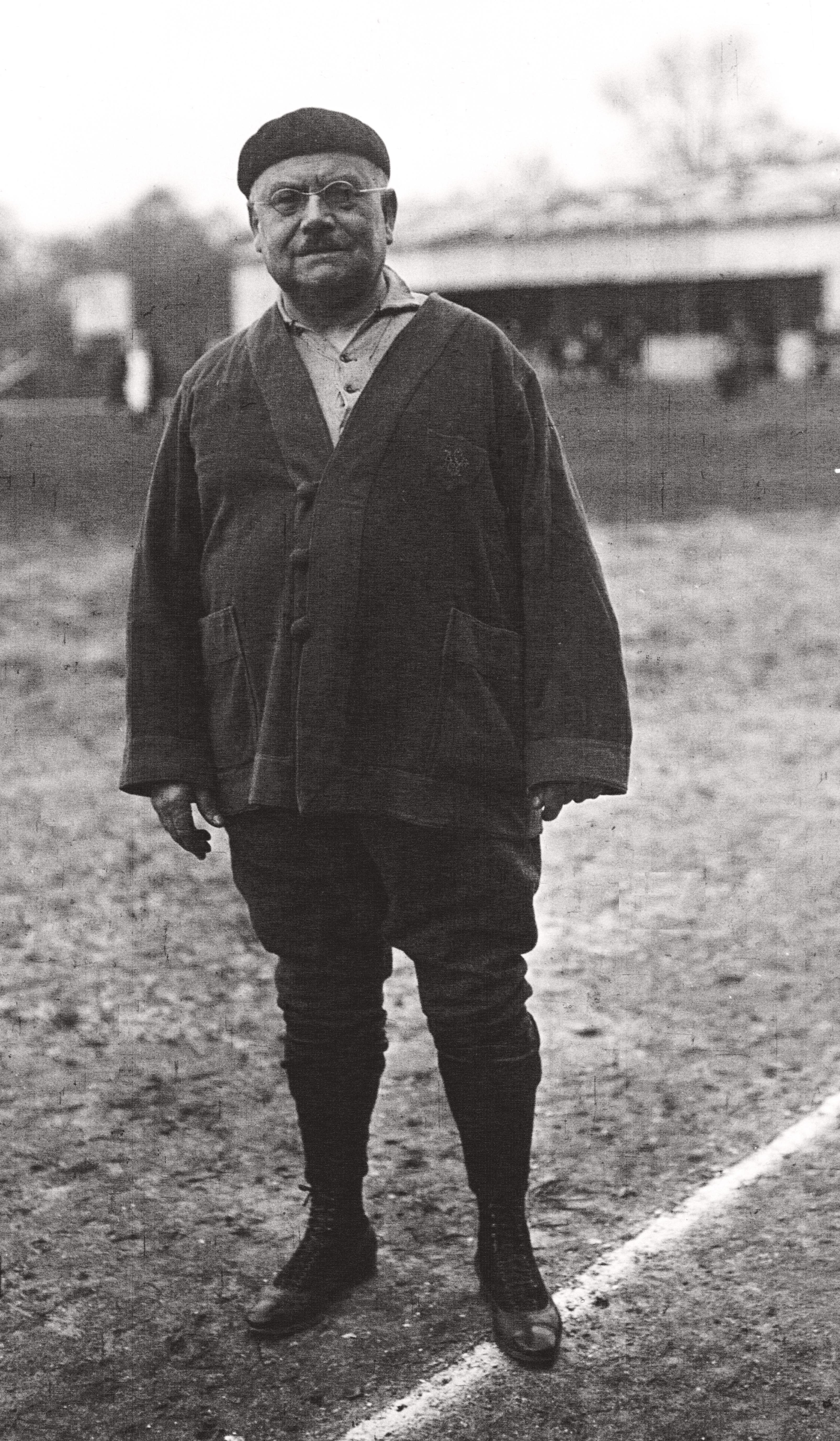
- Brennus in 1922
- Born: Brennus Ambiorix Crosnier; 30 November 1859; Châteaudun, Eure-et-Loir, France
- Died: 23 December 1943 (aged 84); Le Mans, France
- Citizenship: French
- Occupations: Engraver; Chaser; Sports leader; Rugby referee
- Known for: Founding president of the Sporting Club universitaire de France rugby

1st president of Sporting Club universitaire de France rugby
- In office 1895–1904

Brennus Ambiorix Crosnier, better known by his pseudonym Charles Brennus (30 November 1859 – 23 December 1943), was a French medalist, master engraver-chaser, international rugby referee, and sports leader who served as the honorary president of the French Rugby Federation and who is best known for creating the Bouclier de Brennus.

== Early life ==
Brennus Ambiorix Crosnier was born in Châteaudun, Eure-et-Loir, on 30 November 1859, as the son of Jules Alphonse Crosnier (1831–?), a tailor, and Augustine Sibot (1839–?), a seamstress.

== Professional career ==
Brennus was a master engraver-chaser craftsman who ran workshops and stores for medals, cups, and art objects in the 3rd arrondissement of Paris, initially at 17 rue Chapon and later at 40 rue de Montmorency, and his main works include the medals of both the Society of Architects of Seine-et-Marne, and of the newspaper La France de Bordeaux, and most notably, the three versions of the Brennus shield.

== Sporting career ==
Despite his appearance, short stature, pot-bellied profile, and always with glasses, Brennus was a fervent sportsman, dedicating his life to the cause of physical exercises. On 5 December 1895, he founded the Sporting Club Amateur, which later became Sporting Club universitaire de France rugby (SCUF) in 1902. He served SCUF as its first president and also as a member of its first rugby team from 1896 to 1900, being its captain during the first two seasons. His position as president of the SCUF allowed him to establish himself as one of the leaders of the USFSA since 1896, being involved in all of its Commissions, such as rugby, cycling, athletics, swimming, the USFSA Council, and the Paris Committee. He was involved in football; for instance, on 25 April, he started for Club Français in the final of the inaugural Coupe Manier against the newly crowded champions of France Standard AC, helping his side to a 4–3 win after extra-time.

If Brennus did not exist, I believe that he would have to be invented. His existence seems, in fact, as necessary to French rugby as the instrument of the game itself, this ovoid ball with which Brennus made so many sensational entrances onto the playing fields, preceding our national teams, as the referee.

— G. Neumeyer in the French newspaper Le Miroir des sports on 24 February 1921.

In the build-up for the final of the 1892 French Rugby Union Championship, Brennus was asked by his good friend, Pierre de Coubertin, the USFSA president, to have a trophy made for the first final in French rugby history scheduled for 20 March. The final product, based from an original drawing by Coubertin, was an engraved brass shield and plaque, fixed to an ash wood board, and it was named after him. In 1907, Charles Simon's CFI organized its inaugural football championship, the so-called Trophée de France, and for the occasion, Coubertin and Brennus offered a third shield to the winners.

As a referee, Brennus directed some major matches in the 1890s, which earned him notoriety, but also unpopularity. A director of the French Athletics Championships and member of the jury of the 1900 Olympic Games in Paris, Brennus was appointed as president of the USFSA Rugby Commission in 1900, a position that he held for nearly two decades, until 1919, and under his leadership, French rugby experienced its most glorious phase, facing several British teams and enjoying great popularity across the English Channel. The day after our first victory over Ireland and after the very recent one over Scotland, Brennus stated that "In the evening of my life, this victory constitutes the greatest joy of my existence.

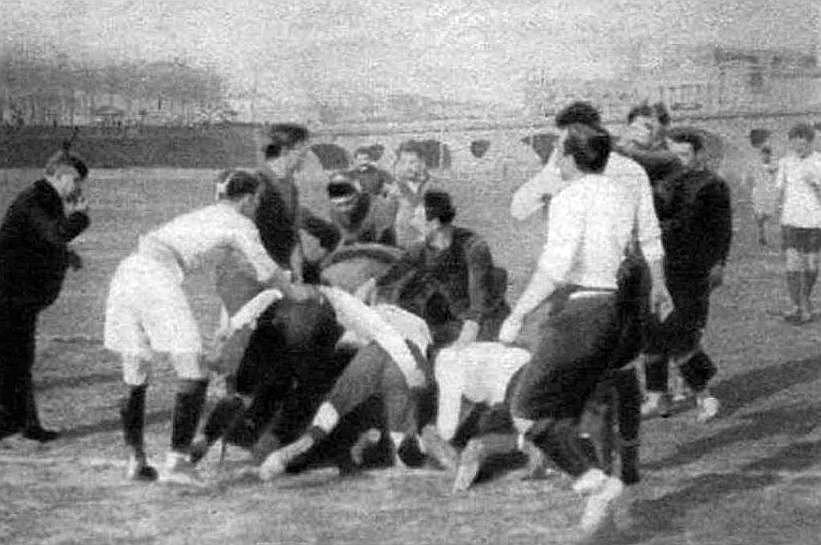
Brennus acting as referee in a match in 1902.

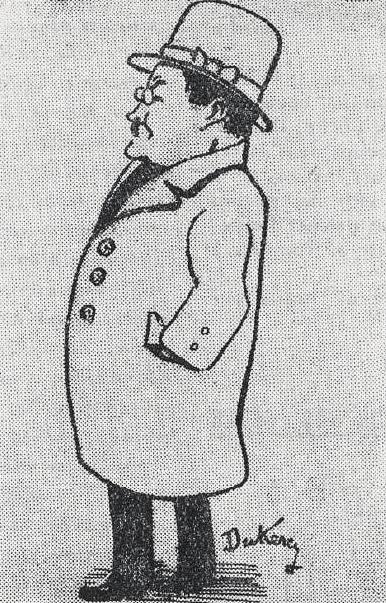
Charles Brennus, in 1913, member of the Rugby Commission.

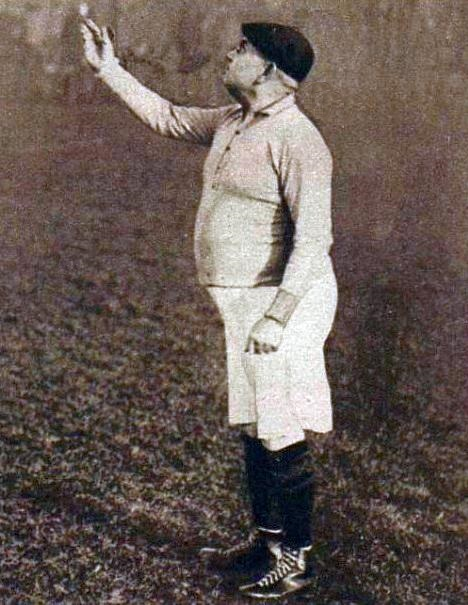
Brennus in 1925, Le Miroir des sports, 4 February 1925.

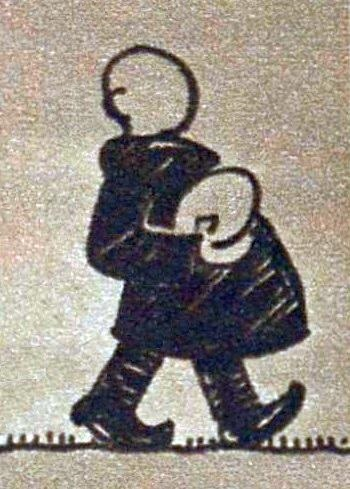
Caricature of Charles Bennus published in Le Miroir des sports on 4 November 1925.

The world of French rugby was greatly damaged by the First World War, which killed 21 international French rugby players, but thanks to the many efforts of Brennus, such as creating a wartime All Black team to carry out a tour of matches throughout France to raise awareness among schoolchildren and high school students about playing rugby, the USFSA survived, which earned him a deserved promotion in the order of the Legion of Honour on 14 July 1920. When each sport got its own federation in 1920, Brennus continued to provide his assistance and support to the French Rugby Federation, which named him as its honorary president.

== Death ==
In 1941, Brennus left his Marais neighborhood for Le Mans, where he lived with his daughter until he died on 23 December 1943, at the age of 86, victim of a uremic attack.

== Legacy ==
In March 1907, Ernest Weber, the star football journalist of L'Auto (the future L'Équipe), refereed to Charles Brennus as the "father of rugby". In February 1921, the French newspaper Le Miroir des sports dedicated a full page to him, called Brennus, le père du rugby français ("Brennus, the father of French rugby"). He did not invent anything in football, nor was he a particularly good player, but its utter devotion to the sport for 25 years.

== See also ==
- List of awards named after people
