= Delolme =

Delolme is a French surname. Notable people with the surname include:

- Georges Delolme (1878–?), Franco-English ice hockey player and footballer
- Jean Louis Delolme (1740–1806), Genevan and British political theorist and writer
- Michel Delolme (born 1959), French cyclist
