= André Saint-Ignan =

French footballer

Personal information
- Full name: Pierre Marcel André Saint-Ignan
- Date of birth: 21 March 1887
- Place of birth: Bordeaux, France
- Date of death: 4 August 1910 (aged 23)
- Place of death: 15th arrondissement of Paris
- Position: Forward

Senior career*
Years	Team	Apps	(Gls)
1904–1906	SA Montrouge		
1906–1908	Club Français		

International career
1908	France	0	(0)
- * Club domestic league appearances and goals

Pierre Marcel André Saint-Ignan, better known as André Saint-Ignan (21 March 1887 – 4 August 1910) was a French footballer who played as a forward for Club Français.

== Early career ==
André Saint-Ignan was born in Bordeaux on 21 March 1887, as the eldest of two siblings from the marriage between Marie Jeanne Henriette Béchade de Fonroche (1862–?) and Théophile Albert Saint-Ignan (1855–1916), an employee of the Orléans railways.

== Career ==
At some point in the early 20th century, Saint-Ignan moved to Paris, where he played for SA Montrouge in 1905. In 1906, he joined Club Français, where he quickly became one of the team's best players considering that on 9 May 1907, he was called up to play for the Paris football team in its annual match against the Nord, which ended in a 3–1 loss.

In October 1908, the USFSA selected Saint-Ignan as a reserve for the French squad that was going to compete in the football tournament of the 1908 Olympic Games, but he ended up not traveling to London. A week later, on 26 October, he started in the final of the 1908 Coupe Manier at the Stade de Charentonneau, which ended in a 7–2 loss to Red Star.

He later became a sports journalist; even though his club was constantly changing fields, CF's position remained solid, even institutional, because many of its members were sitting on the USFSA Football Commission or ensuring media coverage like Weber or André Saint-Ignan.

== Death ==
Saint-Ignan died in the 15th arrondissement of Paris on 4 August 1910, at the age of 23.

== Honours ==
Club Français

- Coupe Manier:
  - Runner-up (1): 1908

== Bibliography ==
- Sorez, Julien (2013). Le football dans Paris et ses banlieues [Football in Paris and its suburbs] (in French). Paris: Presses universitaires de Rennes. p. 410. ISBN 978-2-7535264-3-3.
