= Charles de Saint-Cyr =

French footballer and author (1875–1940)

- Born: 9 February 1875; London, England
- Died: 3 June 1940 (aged 65); Paris, France
- Occupations: Sports journalist; Author; Footballer
- Known for: Co-founder of Red Star
Association football career
Senior career*
Years	Team	Apps	(Gls)
1895–1897	Racing Club de France		
- * Club domestic league appearances and goals

Charles de Saint-Cyr (9 February 1875 – 3 June 1940) was a French footballer and author. In 1897, he co-founded Red Star with Jules Rimet, the future president of FIFA.

== Early life ==
Charles de Saint-Cyr was born in London on 9 February 1875, but spent most of his life in France, where he became an intenséiste poet, a school of which he must have been the only disciple.

He was a law student in France in 1894, the year in which he made his literary debut, with the poetry collection Glanes d'un fol ("Gleanings from a Fool"). At some point in the mid-1890s, he began publishing poems in the French magazine Le Sillon ("The Furrow"), which had been founded by Marc Sangnier in 1894. There, he met Jules Rimet, only a year older, who also published verses, as well as stories and even a Christmas tale, so the two boys began chatting and soon bonded, since they had similar tastes, with Charles eventually revealing a rather surprising corner of his life: Unlike his colleagues, he did not frequent the brasseries of the Latin Quarter to find inspiration, but instead ran through the alleys of the Bois de Boulogne in his underwear while wearing a jersey on his back that exonerated him; he was a "sportsman" of the Racing Club de France.

== Sporting career ==
Alongside Ernest Weber, a fellow journalist and former member of Club Français, Saint-Cyr introduced football to Rimet, and with such mentors, the future president of FIFA was quickly converted. In January 1897, in the following month, on 21 February 1897, the 23-year-old Rimet gathered his circle of close friends at the sports café on rue de Grenelle in the 7th arrondissement of Paris, which included Saint-Cyr and Weber, along with his brother Modeste and his brother-in-law Jean de Pessac, and together, they founded the multi-sports club Red Star, with football gradually taking over all the activities offered. Despite still being in his early 20s, Saint-Cyr seems to have never played for Red Star.

In February 1903, Saint-Cyr was Racing's representative in the USFSA's football commission, and he was also involved in the USFSA's cross-country events. At some point between 1911 and 1913, French photographer Céline Laguarde made a portrait of Saint-Cyr, which is currently conserved at the Musée d'Orsay.

== Military career ==
Saint-Cyr was reported for military service for the first time in 1894, but was discharged four years later, in 1898, due to generalized psoriasis. During the outbreak of the First World War, he was mobilized to the 114th territorial regiment, but a few months later, in February 1915, he was reported as being in a hospital in Antibes. He moved from active to auxiliary in September of the same year and was discharged again for psoriasis in February 1916.

== Writing career ==
In 1907, Saint-Cyr published his second collection Les frissons ("The chills"), and in the 1910s, he began a phase of prolific poetic production, publishing Matines in 1910, Laudes in 1911 and L'âme et le cœur ("The soul and the heart") in 1914. He published the essay Pourquoi l’Italie est notre alliée? ("Why Italy is our ally?") in 1915, the play Noël: mystère des ans de l'épreuve ("Christmas: the mystery of the years of the ordeal") in 1918, and the book Complaintes poèmes suivis de Noël ("Complaints poems followed by Christmas") in 1919, which won the Prix Capuran in 1920. He went on to publish two other collections, one in 1923 and the other in 1929, as well as stories and studies on Italy and Garibaldi.

At Le Sillon, Saint-Cyr evolved from a poet to an apprentice journalist, and likewise, many years later, in 1924, he founded La Semaine à Paris, which he directed until April 1932. In early 1928, he published an article in La Semaine severely criticizing Lupu Pick's 1926 film Das Haus der Lüge ("The House of Lies"). On 15 February 1929, he wrote and published a dithyrambic article about Teinosuke Kinugasa's 1928 film Jūjiro ("Crossroads"), on the occasion of its Parisian release at Studio Diamant, stating "never has the screen offered me one of such complete beauty, of such constant emotion".

== Death ==
Saint-Cyr died in Paris on 3 June 1940, at the age of 65.
