= 1900 Coupe Manier =

Tournament details
- Country: France
- Dates: 14 October – 23 December
- Teams: 6

Final positions
- Champions: Club Français (5th title)
- Runners-up: UA I arrondissement

Tournament statistics
- Matches played: 6
- Goals scored: 23 (3.83 per match)

The 1900 Coupe Manier was the 5th tournament of the Coupe Manier, a French national football cup restricted to clubs fielding no more than three foreign players.

The competition was held in a knock-out format on the road between 14 October and 23 December, and it was contested by 6 Parisian clubs, being won by Club Français after beating UA I arrondissement 1–0 in the final at Joinville-le-Pont, who thus won its fifth title in the competition.

== Tournament ==
The six participants were Nationale de Saint-Mandé, Club Français, AS Française, Gallia Club, UA I arrondissement, and Paris Star, whose president, Mr. Manier, had created the competition in 1897. Due to being the founders of the tournament, Paris Star received a bye to the semifinals, just as Club Français, who got the bye due to being the reigning champions of the Championnat de Paris. In the preliminary rounds, which were held on 14 October, UA I arrondissement trashed Gallia 7–1, while Saint-Mandé defeated AS Française 4–1.

In the semifinals, which were held the following week on 21 October, UA I arrondissement defeated Paris Star in a thrilling 4–3 clash. Club Français was at the peak of its golden age which won two consecutive Paris Championships in 1899 and 1900, but Saint-Mandé strongly contested their bid for supremacy and managed to hold them to a goalless draw, which forced a replay that was played two months later on 16 December, in which Club Français confirmed their favoritism with a 4–0 win.

The final began an hour late because the Association Football Commission had forgotten to appoint a referee; fortunately, the former Club Français player Jack Wood, who was used to refereeing, offered himself up to the task. Due to the absence of Laisné, CF played the entire first half with just 10 men; fortunately, at half-time, Gaston Peltier managed to discover a former CF player among the many spectators, Ernest Weber, who was described in the press as "ancient" not because of his age, since he was still only 23, but because he had not played a single match for at least three years, since 1897. His long period of inactivity had naturally hindered his skills, thus only being able to play as goalkeeper, which forced Lucien Huteau to play the second half as a right winger, from where he helped his side to a 1–0 victory, in a match that ended in the growing darkness.

=== Results ===
Quarter-finals
Paris Star
bye
14 October - Bois de Vincennes
UA I arrondissement	7
Gallia Club	1
14 October - Fontenay-sous-Bois
Nationale de Saint-Mandé	4
AS Française	1
Club Français
bye

Semi-finals
21 October - Pierrefitte-sur-Seine
Paris Star	1
UA I arrondissement	4
21 October - ?
Club Français	0(4)
Nationale de Saint-Mandé	0(0)

Final
23 December – Joinville-le-Pont
Club Français	1
UA I arrondissement	0

=== Quarter-finals ===
14 October 1900

UA I arrondissement	7 – 1	Gallia Club
	Report

Referee: Mr. Friou
14 October 1900

Nationale de Saint-Mandé	4 – 1	AS Française
Holbrook; C. Bilot; G. Bilot	Report

Velòdrom Parc de Sports, Barcelona

=== Semi-final ===
21 October 1900
15:55

Paris Star	1 – 4	UA I arrondissement
Begis	Report	Coletta; Juery; Polès; H. Delolme

Paris Star grounds, Pierrefitte-sur-Seine

21 October 1900

Club Français	0 – 0	Nationale de Saint-Mandé
	Report

Referee: Mr Lancett
16 December 1900

Club Français	4 – 0	Nationale de Saint-Mandé
?	Report

Referee: Mr Moignard

=== Final ===
23 December 1900

Club Français	1 – 0	UA I arrondissement
G. Peltier	Report

Referee: Jack Wood

== See also ==
- 1900 Coupe Van der Straeten Ponthoz
