= 1896 USFSA Football Championship =

1896 Paris Football Championship

Tournament details
- Country: France
- Dates: 12 January – 11 March
- Teams: 9

Final positions
- Champions: Club Français (1st title)
- Runner-up: The White Rovers

The 1896 USFSA Football Championship was the 3rd staging of the USFSA Football Championship. The tournament is also known as 1896 Paris Football Championship because only clubs from Paris participated.

It was played on neutral grounds, in a league system with Club Français being proclaimed champions of France after winning all of its 8 games and conceding just 2 goals.

== Table ==
Pos	Team	Pld	W	D	L	GF	GA	GD	Pts	Qualification or relegation
1	Club Français	8	8	0	0	33	2	+31	16	Champion
2	The White Rovers	8	7	0	1	36	6	+30	14	
3	Standard Athletic Club	7	5	0	2	24	11	+13	10	
4	Football Club de Levallois	8	2	3	3	11	6	+5	7	
5	Cercle Pédestre Asnières	7	3	0	4	10	8	+2	6	
6	Paris Star	8	2	2	4	4	12	−8	6	
7	Sporting Club Neuilly (WD) (Note: SC Neuilly dissolved at the end of the season.)	8	2	1	5	10	11	−1	5	
8	United Sport Club	8	2	0	6	12	20	−8	4	
9	Union Athlétique du Premier Arrondissement	8	0	2	6	2	66	−64	2	

Source: 1896 USFSA

== Summary ==
This championship started in January sees the triumph of the Club Français which ends the season undefeated. Club goalkeeper Lucien Huteau conceded just two goals in eight matches: one against Rovers (4–1 victory on 23 February) and one against Standard (4–1 victory on 15 March).

In April 1896, Le Havre AC decided to challenge the new official French champions Club Français. Unfortunately, the USFSA didn't accept the challenge.
