= Challenge International du Nord =

Annual football tournament in France and Belgium

Chanllenge International du Nord
- Founded: 1898
- Abolished: 1914
- Region: Europe
- Last champions: CASG Paris (1st title)
- Most championships: Royale Union Saint-Gilloise (3 titles)

The Challenge international du Nord (Northern International Challenge) was an annual football tournament featuring clubs from Northern France and Belgium as they could not play in the French Championship. Later teams from Switzerland, Netherlands and England were invited to play. It was hosted in the Lille area (Roubaix, Tourcoing and Lille) between 1898 and 1914 in different formats.

== The Tournament ==
The tournament format changed over the years, originally being played between a French group of teams and a Belgium group, with the semi-finals being played between a French and a Belgian team.

From 1905, the tournament was opened to clubs from the Netherlands, Prinses Wilhelmina in 1905 and GVC Wageningen. Also from Switzerland, BSC Old Boys and Grasshoppers. Between 1909 and 1914, the tournament was exclusively played between French clubs and amateur clubs from England.

== Awards ==
With the exception of Le Havre AC in 1900, the clubs from Belgium won trophies between 1898 and 1908 . Royale Union Saint-Gilloise being the most successful reaching four finals in five years and winning three of them (1904, 1905, 1907).

Tournament History
Edition	Year	Winner	Finalist	Score	Notes
1	1898	(Belgium) Léopold Club de Bruxelles (1)	(France) RC Roubaix	3–1	
2	1899	(Belgium) Léopold Club de Bruxelles (2)	(Belgium) FC Bruges	4–1	
3	1900	(France) Le Havre AC (1)	(France) Club français	3–2	
4	1901	(Belgium) Beerschot AC (1)	(Belgium) Léopold Club de Bruxelles	2–0	
5	1902	(Belgium) Antwerp FC (1)	(Belgium) Beerschot AC	4–2	
6	1903	(Belgium) Racing Club de Bruxelles (1)	(France) RC Roubaix	4–0	
7	1904	(Belgium) Union Saint-Gilloise (1)	(France) United Sports Club	5–0	
8	1905	(Belgium) Union Saint-Gilloise (2)	(Netherlands) Enschedese Football Club Prinses Wilhelmina	3–1	
9	1906	(Belgium) Antwerp FC (2)	(France) US Tourcoing	3–2	
10	1907	(Belgium) Union Saint-Gilloise (3)	(France) Olympique Lillois	4–0	
11	1908	(Belgium) Racing Club de Bruxelles (2)	(Belgium) Union Saint-Gilloise	1–0	
12	1909	(England) Eastbourne FC (1)	(France) RC Roubaix	5–1	
13	1910	(England) Reigate Priory F.C. (1)	(France) CA Paris	3–0	
14	1911	(France) US Tourcoing (1)	(England) Cambridge Town F.C.	2–1	
15	1912	(England) Cambridge Town F.C. (1)	(France) US Tourcoing	4–1	
16	1913	(France) US Tourcoing (2)	(France) Club français	Unknown	
17	1914	(France) CASG Paris (1)	(France) Club français	7–0	

== Sources ==
- RSSSF et archives Pages de Foot
- Olivier Chovaux, 50 ans de football dans le Pas-de-Calais, Arras, Artois Presses Université, 2001
