= Paris Star =

Football club in France

- Full name: Paris Star
- Founded: 1894
- Dissolved: 1963
- Ground: Paris
- League: Ligue de Football Association#LFA Football Championship

The Paris Star was a football team based in Paris that existed between 1894 and 1963. In 1917, the club played with a khaki jersey.

== History ==
=== Early history ===
Founded in 1894, Paris Star participated in the USFSA Football Championship between 1895 and 1898, finishing in 5th place in the latter two. Despite these painful beginnings, President Manier's club remained in the first series of the USFSA Paris championship until 1910, the year in which Paris Star, along with CA Paris, US Suisse, and Red Star FC, decided to leave the USFSA following its refusal to join the French Interfederal Committee (CFI), which had represented France at FIFA for three years, and the four dissent clubs then founded the Ligue de Football Association (LFA).

In 1897, Mr. Manier, president of Paris Star, initiated the creation of the Coupe Manier, which required clubs to field only three foreigners back in a time when the majority of the Parisian clubs had ten, or even eleven foreigners, hence why the inaugural edition was won by Club Français, which was a club exclusively for Frenchmen. In the second edition in 1898, Paris Star reached the final, which was contested against the defending champions Club Français at the Vélodrome de Vincennes on 28 March, conceding three goals in the first half and seven in the second in a resounding 10–0 loss.

Paris Star was one of the 48 clubs that participated in the inaugural Coupe de France in 1917–18, making its debut in a 3–1 victory over London County SC in the preliminary round on 7 October 1917, which was followed by a 2–1 win over Patronage Olier in the first round on 4 November, but the whites were then knocked out in the round of 16 on 2 December, following a resounding 0–11 loss to CASG Paris.

Paris Star is the one 101st company to affiliate with the French Football Federation (FFF), doing so on 28 July 1919. The club participated in the first championship of the Parisian FA League, in series C (second regional level) for the 1919–20 season.

== Decline and collapse ==
In the summer of 1925, Paris Star merged with the Sporting club universitaire de France, forming a new club named Paris Star SCUF, and at the end of the 1927–28 season, the club was renamed to its old version (SCUF). In 1959, the club merged with the Union athlétique et sportive La Clodo, marking the end of Paris Star.

== Notable players ==
Paris Star was the first European club of Félix Romano, who played for them in the 1911–12 season. Romano went on to earn one cap for the French national team in 1913, in which he scored, and then five caps for Italian national team between 1921 and 1924.

== Honours ==
- Coupe Manier
  - Runner-up (1): 1897
