= Coupe Manier =

French football tournament

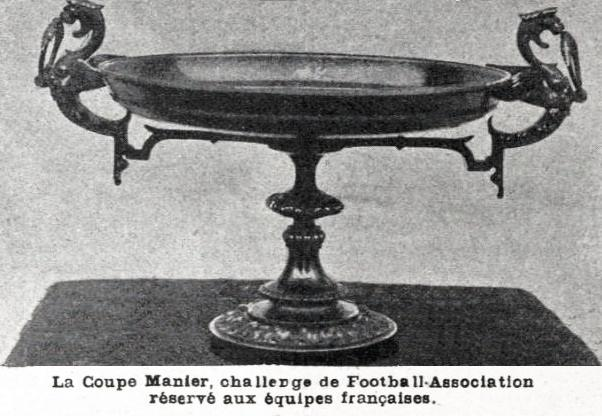
- The Coupe Manier
- Organiser(s): Paris Star
- Founded: 1896
- Abolished: 1911; 115 years ago
- Region: France
- Last champions: US Clichy (1911)
- Most championships: Club Français (3 titles)

The Coupe Manier was a football competition in France that ran from 1897 until 1911. Only clubs that fielded no more than three foreigners were allowed to participate in the competition, which at the time was mainly British people living and residing in Paris. It was named in honor of the donor of the trophy, Mr. Manier, president of the Paris Star. In response to this condition, the Coupe Dewar was played, in which French clubs with multiple English players could participate.

== 1900 Coupe Van der Straeten Ponthoz ==
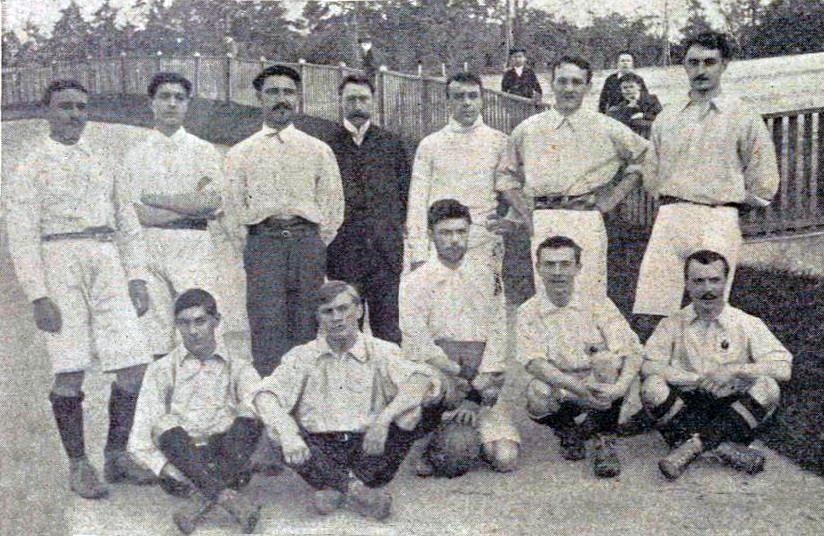
The 1903 Gallia winning squad on Sunday 8 November 1903.

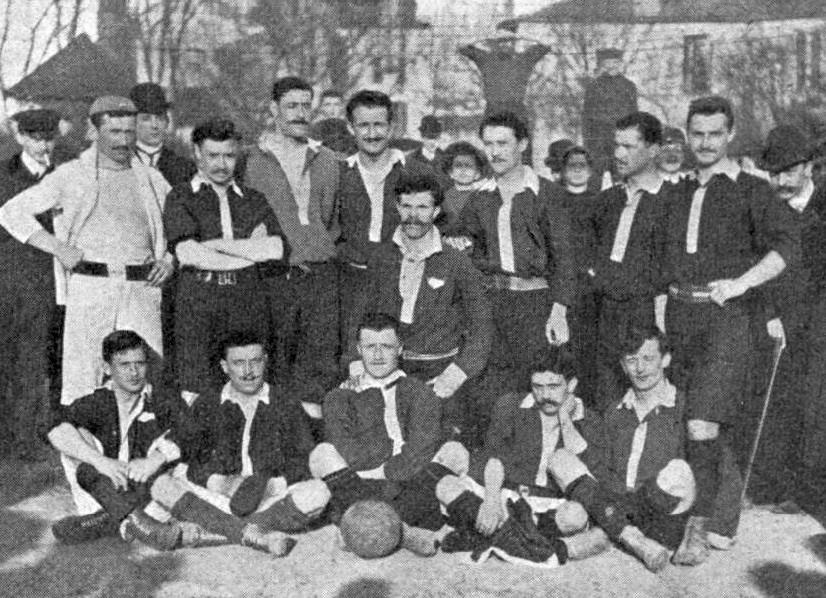
CA Paris won the Manier Cup in April 1905.

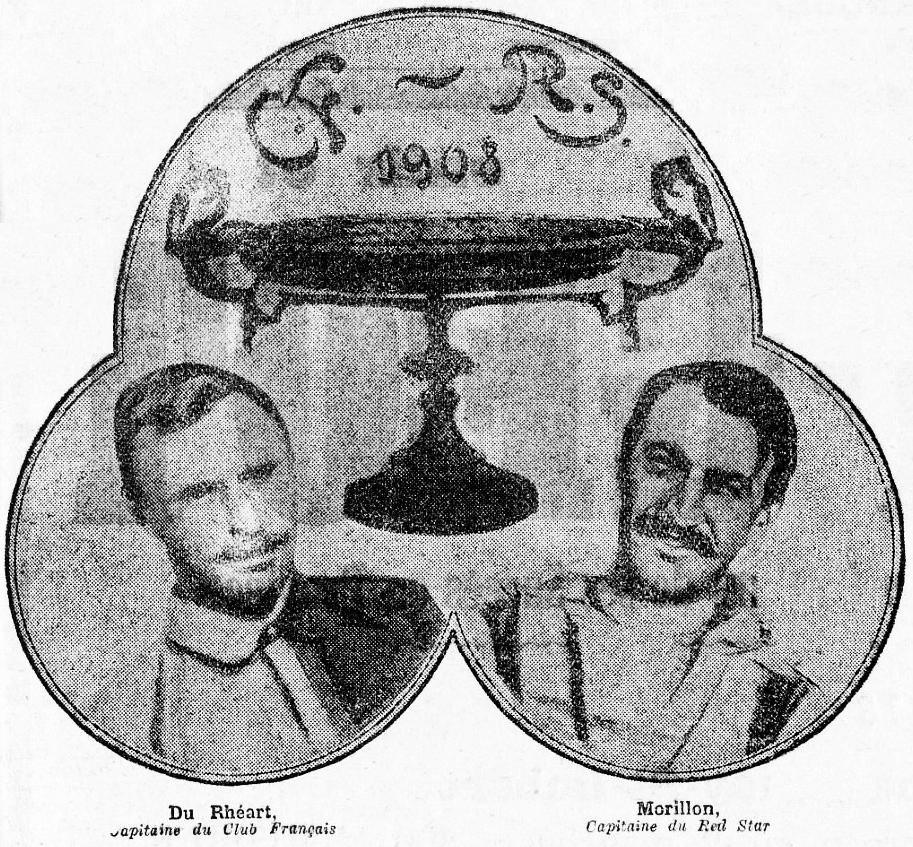
The captains of the 1908 Manier Cup.

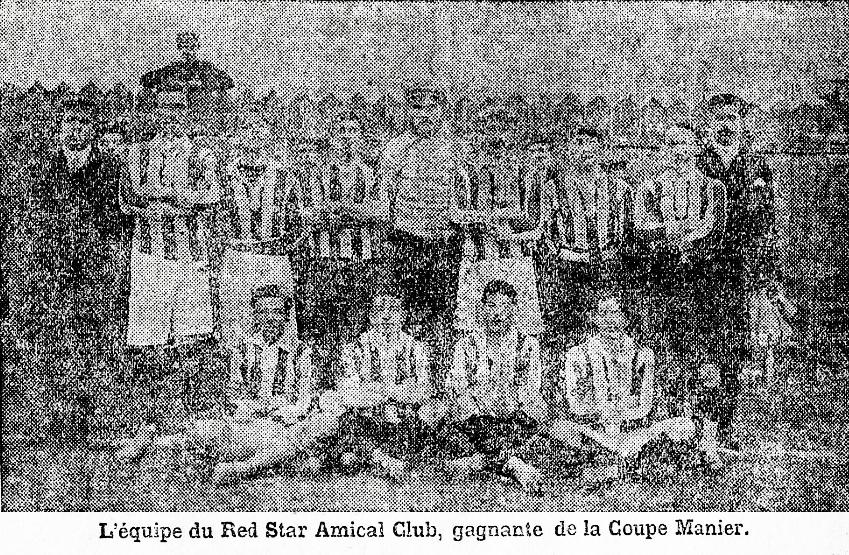
The Red Star winning squad in October 1908.

The competition was initially dominated by Club Français, who won each of the first five editions between 1896 and 1900, beating the likes of Le Havre AC, the organizers Paris Star, RC Roubaix (twice), and UA I arrondissement in the finals. Français then won a sixth and last title in the 1902 edition, whose final was played on 4 January 1903, defeating Olympique Lillois in the final.

The finalists of the 1903 and 1904 editions were Gallia Club Paris and CA Paris, with the former winning in 1903 and the latter in 1904. Between 1905 and 1907, the Coupe Manier was awarded to the highest-ranked team in the Paris Championship, which was CA Paris in 1905, RC Paris in 1906, and AS Française in 1907; however, RC Paris did not meet the criteria to obtain the trophy, so CA Paris retained it. This rule was used again for its last edition in 1911.

== Champions ==
=== List of finals ===
Year	Champion	Result	Runner-up	Location of the final
1896	Club Français	5–3 (A.E.T)	Le Havre AC	Courbevoie Velodrome
1897	Club Français (2)	10–0	Paris Star	Vélodrome de Vincennes
1898	Club Français (3)	3–1	RC Roubaix	Suresnes
1899	Club Français (4)	6–0	RC Roubaix	Suresnes
1900	Club Français (5)	1–0	UA I arrondissement	Joinville
1901	Nationale de St-Mandé	3–2 (A.E.T)	US Parisienne	Maisons-Alfort
1902 (Note: The final was played on 4 January 1903)	Club Français (6)	7–0	Olympique Lillois	Le Vésinet
1903 (Note: The final was played on 8 November 1903)	Gallia Club Paris	3–2 (A.E.T)	CA Paris	Vélodrome de Vincennes
1904	CA Paris (2)	5–2	Gallia Club Paris	Joinville
1905	CA Paris (3)			
1906	CA Paris (4)			
1907	AS Française			
1908 (Note: The final was played on 25 October 1908)	Red Star	3–2	Club Français	Maisons-Alfort
1909	CA XIVe	5–1	Stade Français	Maisons-Alfort
1910–11	US Clichy			

=== Titles by club ===
Club	Titles	Year
Club Français	6	1896, 1897, 1898, 1899, 1900, 1902
Nationale de St-Mandé / CA Paris	4	1901, 1904, 1905, 1906
Gallia Club Paris	1	1903
AS Française	1	1907
Red Star	1	1908
CA XIVe	1	1909
US Clichy	1	1910–11

== See also ==
- Challenge Cup
- Challenge International du Nord
- Copa Espuñes
