= Club Français =

French association football club

- Full name: Club Français Paris
- Founded: 1890
- Dissolved: 1935; 91 years ago
Home colours

Club Français (French: Club français) was a French association football club based in Paris which was founded in 1890. Club Français won the 1896 USFSA Football Championship and the 1931 Coupe de France.

In 1900 the USFSA elected players from Club Français to represent France at the Summer Olympics. The team (wearing the USFSA representative uniform) won the silver medal after two matches played.

Original kit

Club Français was the first club to be established by French citizens, rather than by foreign expatriates. It took part in all the competitions organised by the USFSA, gaining a reputation as one of the most important clubs in the country between 1896 and 1904, during which it won a domestic league, one Dewar Cup and six Manier Cups.

In 1915, the club left USFSA to join the Ligue de Football Association, winning a Challenge de la Renommée competition during World War I. Affiliated to French Football Federation since 1919, Club Français competed in the Paris Football League, winning two championships in 1929 and 1930 and a Coupe de France in 1931.

Club Français became professional in 1932, competing in the first ever Ligue 1 season, but the team was relegated to Division 2 when the season concluded. Due to financial problems, the club abandoned the second division championship in 1934. Without a home venue, Club Français merged with Dionysian Athletic Football Club based in Saint-Denis. The new club renamed "Athletic Football Club Dionysian-Club", leaving also its traditional pink and black colors.

== Honours ==
Domestic

- USFSA Championship
  - Winners (1): 1896
- Coupe de France
  - Winners (1): 1931
- Latin Capital Cup
  - Runners-up: 1929

International

- Olympic Games
  - Silver medalists (1): 1900
