= Football at the 1908 Summer Olympics – Men's team squads =

The following teams took part at the 1908 Summer Olympics:

== Great Britain ==
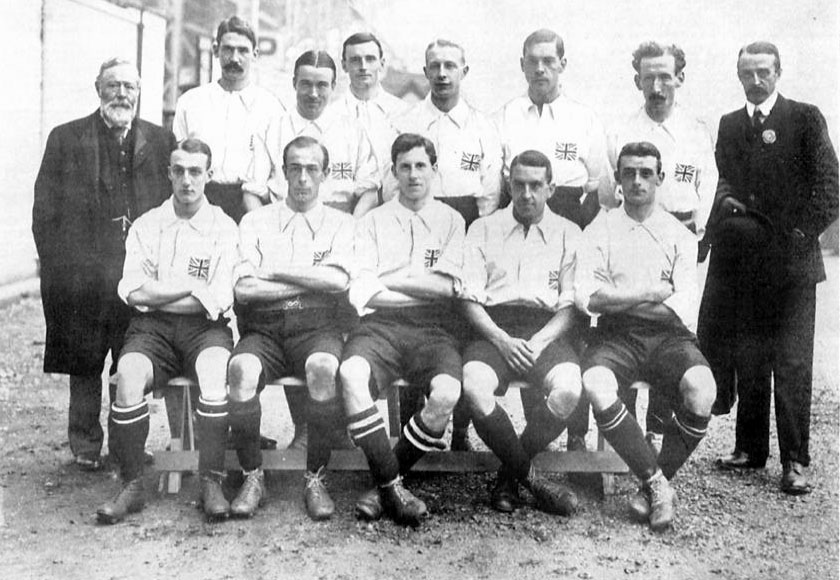
Great Britain

Great Britain was represented by the England national amateur football team.
Coach: Alfred Davis

No.	Pos.	Player	Date of birth (age)	Caps	Goals	1908 club
	GK	Horace Bailey	3 July 1881 (aged 27)	7		(The Football Association) Leicester Fosse
R	FW	George Barlow	19 September 1885 (aged 23)	1		(The Football Association) Wigan Grammar School Old Boys Club
R	DF	Albert Edward Bell		3		(The Football Association) Woking FC
	FW	Arthur Berry	3 January 1888 (aged 20)	4		(The Football Association) Liverpool F.C.
R	GK	Ronald Brebner	23 September 1881 (aged 27)	3		(The Football Association) Chelsea F.C.
	MF	Frederick Chapman	10 May 1883 (aged 25)	3		(The Football Association) South Notts F.C.
	DF	Walter Corbett	26 November 1880 (aged 27)	11		(The Football Association) Birmingham City F.C.
R	DF	Wilfrid Crabtree	1 February 1885 (aged 23)	0		(The Football Association) Blackburn Crosshill FC
R	MF	Walter Daffern		1		(The Football Association) Royal Engineers AFC
	FW	Harold Hardman	4 April 1882 (aged 26)	10		(The Football Association) Manchester United F.C.
	FW	Robert Hawkes	18 October 1880 (aged 28)	14		(The Football Association) Luton Town F.C.
	MF	Kenneth Hunt	24 February 1884 (aged 24)	4		(The Football Association) Wolverhampton Wanderers F.C.
R	FW	Thomas Porter	25 October 1885 (aged 22)	1		(The Football Association) Stockport County FC
	FW	Clyde Purnell	14 May 1877 (aged 31)	4		(The Football Association) Clapton F.C.
R	DF	Albert Scothern	12 September 1882 (aged 26)	3		(The Football Association) Oxford City FC
	DF	Herbert Smith	22 November 1877 (aged 30)	10		(The Football Association) Reading F.C.
	FW	Harold Stapley	29 April 1883 (aged 25)	5		(The Football Association) Glossop North End A.F.C.
	FW	Vivian Woodward (c)	3 June 1879 (aged 29)	25		(The Football Association) Tottenham Hotspur F.C.

The following players were also part of Great Britain's squad, but did not play in any matches: Robert Bill Bayley, Arthur Bell, John Charnley, Paul Hayden, Willie Jordan, Lionel Louch, Eversley Mansfield, Charles Horace Pearce, Arthur Prest, John Prosser, Ernest Proud, James Raine, Harold Uren, Ernest Williams, Gordon Wright

== Denmark ==
Denmark was represented by the Denmark national football team.
Coach: (England) Charles Williams

No.	Pos.	Player	Date of birth (age)	Caps	Goals	1908 club
	FW	Peter Marius Andersen	25 April 1885 (aged 23)	0		(Danish Football Association) BK Frem
R	DF	Magnus Beck	8 December 1889 (aged 18)	0		(Danish Football Association) B.93
R	MF	Ødbert E. Bjarnholt	21 December 1885 (aged 22)	0		(Danish Football Association) BK Frem
	MF	Harald Bohr	22 May 1887 (aged 21)	0		(Danish Football Association) AB
	DF	Charles Buchwald	22 October 1880 (aged 27)	0		(Danish Football Association) AB
	GK	Ludvig Drescher	21 July 1881 (aged 27)	0		(Danish Football Association) KB
	FW	Johannes Gandil	21 May 1873 (aged 35)	0		(Danish Football Association) B.93
	DF	Harald Hansen	14 March 1884 (aged 24)	0		(Danish Football Association) B.93
R	MF	Knud Hansen		0		(Danish Football Association) BK Olympia
	MF	August Lindgren	1 August 1883 (aged 25)	0		(Danish Football Association) B.93
R	DF	Einar Middelboe	25 September 1883 (aged 25)	0		(Danish Football Association) KB
	DF	Kristian Middelboe (c)	24 March 1881 (aged 27)	0		(Danish Football Association) KB
	DF	Nils Middelboe	5 October 1887 (aged 21)	0		(Danish Football Association) KB
	FW	Sophus Nielsen	15 March 1888 (aged 20)	0		(Danish Football Association) BK Frem
	FW	Oskar Nielsen	4 October 1882 (aged 26)	0		(Danish Football Association) KB
	FW	Bjørn Rasmussen	19 May 1885 (aged 23)	0		(Danish Football Association) KB
	FW	Vilhelm Wolfhagen	11 November 1889 (aged 18)	0		(Danish Football Association) KB

== Netherlands ==
Netherlands was represented by the Netherlands national football team.
Coach: (England) Edgar Chadwick

No.	Pos.	Player	Date of birth (age)	Caps	Goals	1908 club
R	FW	Tonie van Renterghem	17 April 1885 (aged 23)	3		(Royal Dutch Football Association) HBS Craeyenhout
	GK	Reinier Beeuwkes	17 February 1884 (aged 24)	8		(Royal Dutch Football Association) DFC
R	DF	Jan van den Berg	22 August 1879 (aged 29)	0		(Royal Dutch Football Association) HFC Haarlem
R	GK	Lo la Chapelle	22 June 1888 (aged 20)	1		(Royal Dutch Football Association) HVV Den Haag
	FW	Frans de Bruyn Kops	28 October 1886 (aged 21)	1		(Royal Dutch Football Association) HBS Craeyenhout
	MF	Karel Heijting	1 May 1883 (aged 25)	7		(Royal Dutch Football Association) HVV Den Haag
	MF	Jan Kok	9 July 1889 (aged 19)	0		(Royal Dutch Football Association) UD Deventer
	MF	Bok de Korver	27 January 1883 (aged 25)	8		(Royal Dutch Football Association) Sparta Rotterdam
R	MF	Vic Gonsalves	20 October 1887 (aged 20)	0		(Royal Dutch Football Association) HBS Craeyenhout
R	FW	Wim Groskamp	8 October 1886 (aged 22)	0		(Royal Dutch Football Association) HVV Quick
	MF	Emil Mundt (c)	30 May 1880 (aged 28)	0		(Royal Dutch Football Association) HVV Den Haag
	DF	Louis Otten	5 November 1883 (aged 24)	2		(Royal Dutch Football Association) HVV Quick
	FW	Jops Reeman	9 August 1886 (aged 22)	0		(Royal Dutch Football Association) HVV Quick
	FW	Edu Snethlage	5 November 1883 (aged 24)	4		(Royal Dutch Football Association) HVV Quick
	MF	Eetje Sol	10 June 1881 (aged 27)	0		(Royal Dutch Football Association) HVV Den Haag
	FW	Jan Thomée	4 December 1886 (aged 21)	4		(Royal Dutch Football Association) Concordia Delft
	FW	Caius Welcker	9 July 1885 (aged 23)	4		(Royal Dutch Football Association) HVV Quick

The following players were also part of the Dutch squad, but did not play in any matches: Jack Akkersdijk, Aaron Cas Julian Begeer, Kees Bekker, Jan Brutel de la Riviere, Jur Haak, John Heijning, Ernest Jacobi, Hannes Mads Linthout, Friedrich Giovanni Pluim, Noud Stempels, Sebastian Veen, Hubertus Leopoldus Visser, Willem Boerdam

== Sweden ==
Sweden was represented by the Sweden men's national football team.

Head coach: Ludvig Kornerup

No.	Pos.	Player	Date of birth (age)	Caps	Goals	1908 club
	FW	Sune Almkvist	4 February 1886 (aged 22)	0		(Swedish Football Association) IFK Uppsala
	DF	Nils Andersson	10 March 1887 (aged 21)	1		(Swedish Football Association) IFK Göteborg
	FW	Karl Ansén	26 July 1887 (aged 21)	2		(Swedish Football Association) AIK Stockholm
	GK	Oskar Bengtsson	14 January 1885 (aged 23)	1		(Swedish Football Association) Örgryte IS
	FW	Gustaf Bergström	4 July 1884 (aged 24)	1		(Swedish Football Association) Örgryte IS
	FW	Arvid Fagrell	10 August 1888 (aged 20)	0		(Swedish Football Association) IFK Göteborg
	DF	Åke Fjästad	16 December 1887 (aged 20)	1		(Swedish Football Association) IFK Stockholm
	MF	Karl Gustafsson	16 September 1888 (aged 20)	2		(Swedish Football Association) IFK Köping
	MF	Valter Lidén	10 March 1887 (aged 21)	0		(Swedish Football Association) IFK Göteborg
	MF	Hans Lindman (c)	6 September 1884 (aged 24)	2		(Swedish Football Association) IFK Uppsala
	DF	Theodor Malm	23 October 1889 (aged 18)	2		(Swedish Football Association) AIK Stockholm
	FW	Sven Ohlsson	14 February 1888 (aged 20)	0		(Swedish Football Association) Mariebergs IK
	FW	Olof Ohlsson	4 October 1888 (aged 20)	0		(Swedish Football Association) IFK Eskilstuna
	MF	Sven Olsson	3 October 1889 (aged 19)	2		(Swedish Football Association) Örgryte IS

The following players were also part of Sweden's squad, but did not play in any matches: Erik Bergström, Kenneth Börjeson, Thor Ericsson, Gustav Thomas Lindblom, and Gunnar Jonas Mellin.

== France ==
France was represented by the France national football team, divided into two squads.

No.	Pos.	Player	Date of birth (age)	Caps	Goals	1908 club
	FW	Georges-Henri Albert	21 August 1882 (aged 26)			(French Football Federation) CA Paris
	MF	Georges Bayrou	21 December 1883 (aged 24)			(French Football Federation) Gallia Club Paris
	MF	Gaston Cyprès	19 November 1884 (aged 23)			(French Football Federation) CA Paris
R	DF	Albert Dubly				(French Football Federation) RC Roubaix
	DF	Jean Dubly	9 August 1886 (aged 22)			(French Football Federation) RC Roubaix
	FW	René Fenouillière	22 October 1882 (aged 25)			(French Football Federation) Red Star Amical Club
	FW	André François (c)	13 January 1886 (aged 22)			(French Football Federation) RC Roubaix
	MF	Charles Renaux	31 December 1884 (aged 23)			(French Football Federation) RC Roubaix
	FW	Émile Sartorius	11 September 1883 (aged 25)			(French Football Federation) RC Roubaix
	FW	Louis Schubart	9 April 1885 (aged 23)			(French Football Federation) Olympique Lillois
R	GK	Jules Signoret				(French Football Federation)
	GK	Maurice Tillette	29 December 1884 (aged 23)			(French Football Federation) US Boulogne
	DF	Ursule Wibaut	18 June 1887 (aged 21)			(French Football Federation) Olympique Lillois

The following players were also part of France's squad, but did not play in any matches: Oscar Desaulty (AS Française), Julien du Rhéart (Club Français), Jean Zimmermann (AS Française), and Gabriel Hanot (US Tourcoing).

The following players were chosen as reserves, but did not travel: Marius Royet (US Parisienne), André Puget (Racing Club de France), and André Saint-Ignan (Club Français); and the following players were originally chosen for France A, but were unavailable due to military service: Emile Fontaine (Olympique Lillois), Henri Moigneu (US Tourquennoise), Victor Sergent (Racing Club de France), and Louis Mesnier (CA Paris).

== France B ==
No.	Pos.	Player	Date of birth (age)	Caps	Goals	1908 club
	DF	Charles Bilot	10 March 1883 (aged 25)			(French Football Federation) CA Paris
	MF	Sadi Dastarac	14 June 1888 (aged 20)			(French Football Federation) Gallia Club Paris
	GK	Fernand Desrousseaux	23 October 1879 (aged 28)			(French Football Federation) US Tourcoing
	FW	Adrien Filez	27 August 1885 (aged 23)			(French Football Federation) US Tourcoing
	MF	Raoul Gressier	19 November 1885 (aged 22)			(French Football Federation) Calais RUFC
	FW	Henri Holgard	17 December 1884 (aged 23)			(French Football Federation) Amiens AC
	FW	Albert Jenicot	15 February 1885 (aged 23)			(French Football Federation) RC Roubaix
	FW	Paul Mathaux	19 February 1888 (aged 20)			(French Football Federation) US Boulogne
	MF	Pierre Six	18 January 1888 (aged 20)			(French Football Federation) Olympique Lillois
R	DF	Georges Prouvost				(French Football Federation) US Tourcoing
	DF	Jules Verlet (c)	16 August 1883 (aged 25)			(French Football Federation) CA Paris
	MF	Justin Vialaret	12 November 1883 (aged 24)			(French Football Federation) CA XIVeme

Étienne Morillon (Red Star Amical Club) and Albert Schaff (CA XIVeme) were also part of France B's squad, but withdrew at the last moment, while Victor Denis (US Tourcoing) and Robert Eucher (AS Française) were part of the squad, but did not play in any matches.

The following players were chosen as reserves, but did not travel: Julien Denis (US de Calais), Auguste Schalbart (Stade Français), Raymond Gigot (Club Français), Ernest Guéguen (Gallia Club), Raymond Jouve (Gallia Club); and the following 2 players were originally chosen for France B, but were unavailable: Zacharie Baton (Olympique Lillois), and Fernand Canelle (Club Français).

== France C ==
Initially, the USFSA intended to send three teams to the Olympic Games, so they listed a total of 29 players for this would-be squad, which included the likes of Pierre Allemane, Henri Bellocq, Georges Bon, René Camard, Albert Cochelin, Jacques Davy, Henri Guerre, Félix Julien, Eugène Maës, Henri Mouton, Eugène Nicolaï, Ernest Tossier, Charles Wilkes, Paul Zeiger, and Jules Verbrugge.

== Sources ==
- RSSSF
- IFFSH archive
- FIFA
