= Raymond Jouve =

French footballer and referee

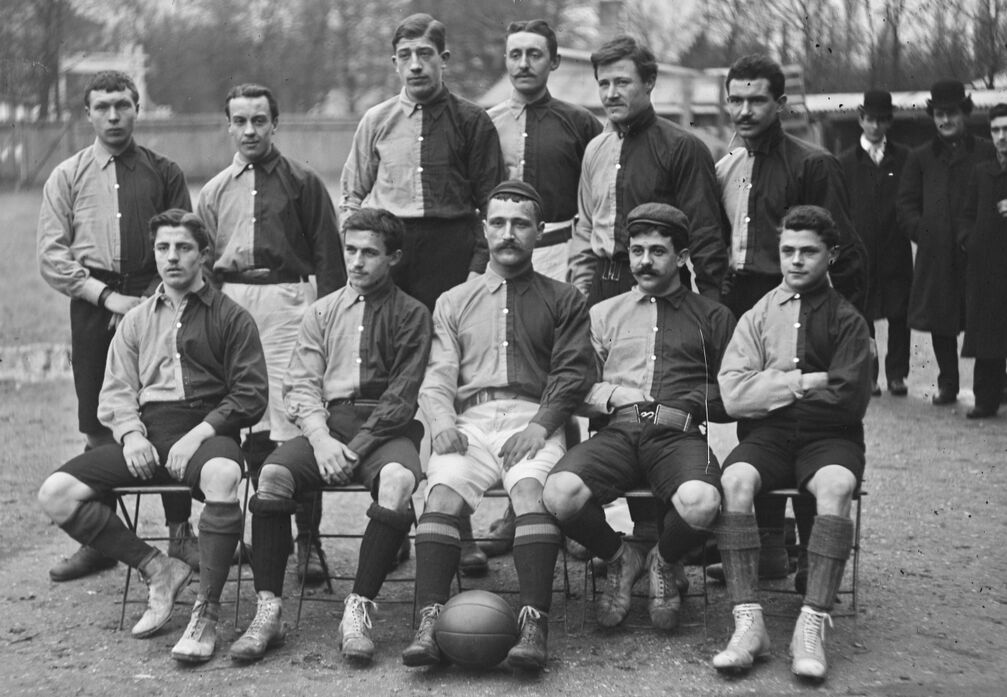
- Jouve (seated, in the center, with the ball) in 1906

Personal information
- Full name: Raymond Marius Jean Jouve
- Date of birth: 10 February 1886
- Place of birth: Sète, Hérault, France
- Date of death: Unknown
- Place of death: Neuville-Saint-Vaast, France
- Positions: Winger; defender

Senior career*
| Years | Team | Apps | (Gls) |
| 1902–1911 | Gallia Club | | |

International career
| 1906 | Paris | 1 | (1) |
| 1906 | France | 1 | (0) |
| 1908 | France B | 0 | (0) |
- * Club domestic league appearances and goals

Raymond Marius Jean Jouve (10 February 1886 – unknown) was a French footballer who played as a winger and defender for Gallia Club and the French national team in the first decade of the 20th century. He later worked as a referee.

== Early life ==
Raymond Jouve was born on 10 February 1886 in the Hérault city of Cette (currently known as Sète), to a father who worked at the Paris-Lyon-Méditerranée railway line (PLM). His father was transferred to the station of Charenton, the city that not only hosted the Gallia Club, but also the Lycée Charlemagne, where Jouve studied while also playing football for the school's team since at least November 1900, aged 14. Coincidentally, Gallia's best player was a Sète native, Georges Bayrou, and he might have influenced the young Jouve to join Gallia in early 1902, aged 16.

== Club career ==
=== First steps ===
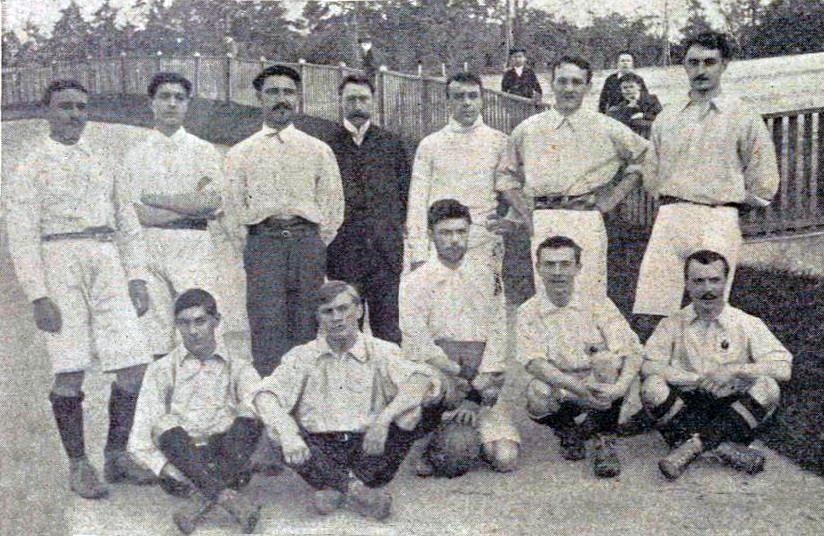
Jouve (seated, in the center, with the ball) with the 1903 Gallia winning squad on Sunday 8 November 1903.

In March 1902, Jouve started in the final of the second series of the USFSA Paris championship against FEC Levallois. On 27 October 1902, he started in the opening match of the Paris championship's top series against Racing Club de France; in its preview, the journalists of La Presse stated that "two players stand out clearly from the lot, Jouve at the front and Nicolet at the back, the others are ordinary".

In December 1902, the 16-year-old Jouve scored a hat-trick against Paris Star, and a brace against Levallois in April 1903, thus being quickly labeled as a goalscorer. As an individualist, he quickly became a "dribbling game" player, who rushed towards the goal all alone, with passion and a modest brilliance, and therefore he was sometimes criticized for holding the ball too much and for having "too personal a game". On 8 November 1903, Jouve started in the final of the 1903–04 Coupe Manier in Vincennes, in which Jouve scored the opening goal in the 25th minute to help his side to a 3–2 victory over CA Paris after extra-time.

In March 1904, Jouve refereed a match between the second teams of RC France and United SC, which ended in a 3–1 win to the former; both sides found his performance "satisfactory".

=== National and international success ===
In 1905, Gallia Club won the USFSA Paris championship, and this victory qualified the club for the USFSA national championship; in the semifinals against Amiens in Toulouse on 9 April, Jouve was involved in each of the five goals scored by his team, opening the score with a header, followed by a shot from twenty meters away, and one assist in the first half, plus two more goals in the second. In the final against RC Roubaix at the Parc des Princes on 16 April, Jouve scored the only goal of the match with a header in the fifth period of extra-time, after nearly two and a half hours played, thus contributing decisively to his team's triumph.

On 26 October 1905, Jouve started for Gallia, the newly-crowned champions of France, in a prestigious international friendly match against the champions of Spain, Madrid FC (currently known as Real Madrid), who were playing their first-ever international match that day. This match was held in the Spanish capital to commemorate the visit of French President Émile Loubet to Madrid, and it was attended by King Alfonso XIII; Jouve was once again the only scorer of his team in a 1–1 draw.

Two weeks later, in May 1906, Jouve was unable to take part in the final of the Coupe Dewar in 1906 because he was detained by his duties as a security guard during that year's general election. In October 1906, Ernest Weber, the star journalist of the French newspaper L'Auto (the forerunner of L'Équipe), stated that his change of positions from center-forward to center-half improved the Gallia team because it forced him to abandon his personal game, adding that after "realizing that he can no longer shine with a particular brilliance, he will become the perfect player he believes himself to be".

=== Later career ===
On 18 April 1909, Jouve, now a full-back, started in the final of the Coupe Dewar in 1909 at Stade de Charentonneau, helping his side to keep a clean-sheet in a 5–0 win over AS Française. On 8 May 1910, he started in the final of the 1910 Coupe Dewar, again as a full-back alongside Emile Fontaine, and Jouve "had some good moments, but he made, just like Verlet, some big mistakes" in an eventual 1–3 loss to CA Paris. He was still a full-back in Gallia as late as May 1911, aged 25.

== International career ==
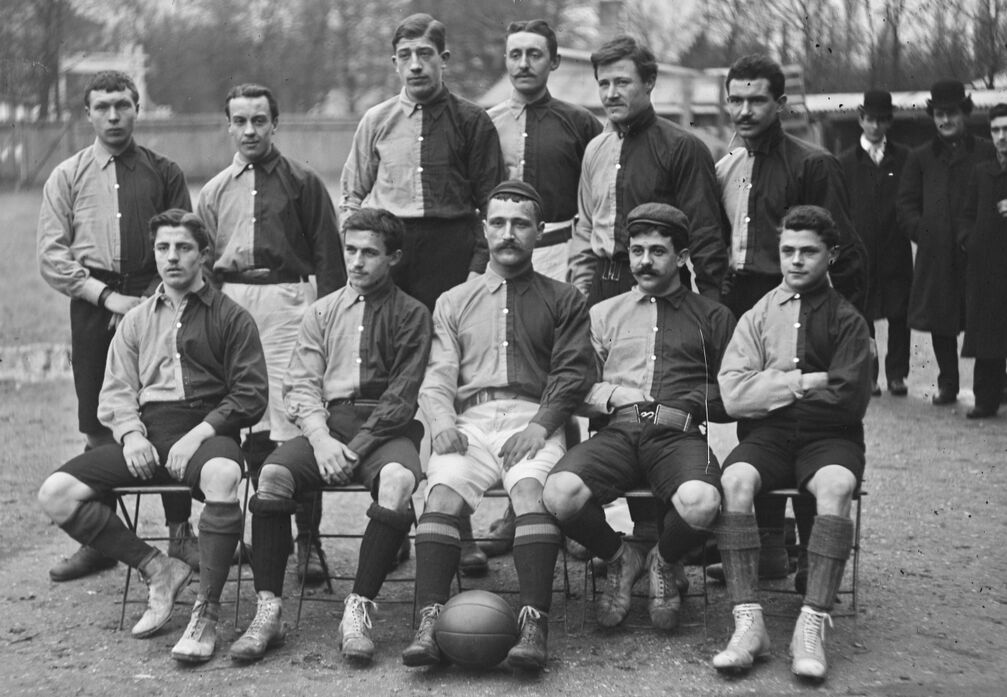
Jouve (seated, in the center, with the ball on his feet) with the Paris selection in 1906.

Despite all his club success in 1905, Jouve was not called up for the national team, which played twice in 1905, because the starting center forward was the veteran Georges Garnier, who was untouchable at the time, but three months later, in January 1906, he started for the Paris football team in the 1906 Paris-Nord meeting, an annual test match for the French national team, scoring once and having a second one disallowed for offside to help his side to a 3–0 win.

This performance convinced France's head coaches, the Northerner André Billy and the Parisian André Espir, to give the 20-year-old Gigot his first (and only) international cap for France in a friendly match against Belgium in Saint-Cloud on 22 April 1906; however, he was placed on the right wing, instead of his usual position of center-forward, thus failing to score as France lost 0–5. As an individualist, he was moved to the wings because at the time, wingers had the right to play in an individual way, but not the central trio, who are supposed to combine, hence why the local press stated "Jouve became a winger to the great surprise of many people; in this position he can use his great qualities and his obvious faults at his ease". Furthermore, the captain of the French team, Pierre Allemane, forgot to give Jouve the instructions he had received from Espir: to mark and hinder Belgian's full-back Edgard Poelmans, hence why he remained isolated on the wing, "which made him look useless and overwhelmed like a transplant". If this had been done, Jouve would have become the first international player theoretically responsible for applying individual gegenpressing, a first in terms of tactics.

This catastrophic performance, for which he was openly mocked in the press, marked a turning point to a trajectory that had been upward until then, since he began to appear less and less in the press, and such was his deterioration, that two years later, in October 1908, the USFSA selected the 22-year-old Jouve only as a reserve for the French B squad that was going to compete in the football tournament of the 1908 Olympic Games, but he ended up not traveling to London, thus avoiding France B's humiliating 0–9 loss to Denmark on 19 October.

== Later life and death ==
A railway employee like his father, Jouve was assigned to the PLM during the First World War because the continuity of railway services was essential; therefore, he escaped the carnage that killed so many French internationals. In 1922, he began to devote himself to refereeing. He was released from military service in 1932.

The date of his death is unknown, as it cannot be found either on his birth certificate or in the INSEE registers.

== Legacy ==
Like many French internationals from the start of the 20th century, Jouve was the victim of mistakes by historians, being initially given the first name Albert, until further research found the initial R as his first name, at the French press of the time, on several occasions. In the 1986–87 season, the FFF directory referred to him as René, but eventually the name "Raymond Jouvé" was discovered in a report of the 1905 match between Gallia Club and Real Madrid made by Spanish magazine Marca.

== Honours ==
Gallia Club

- USFSA Paris Championship:
  - Champions (1): 1904–05
- USFSA Football Championship:
  - Champions (1): 1905
- Coupe Manier:
  - Champions (1): 1903
- Coupe Dewar:
  - Champions (1): 1909
  - Runner-up (2): 1906 and 1910
