= François Barat =

French footballer

Personal information
- Full name: François Marie Barat
- Date of birth: 10 February 1889
- Place of birth: Saint-Brisson, Nièvre, France
- Date of death: Unknown
- Position: Midfielder

Senior career*
Years	Team	Apps	(Gls)
1905–1910	AS Bon Conseil		

International career
1909	France	2	(0)
- * Club domestic league appearances and goals

François Marie Barat (10 February 1889 – unknown) was a French footballer who played as a midfielder for AS Bon Conseil and the French national team between 1908 and 1910.

== Early life ==
Born in Saint-Brisson, Nièvre, on 10 February 1889, Barat played his entire career in the patronage clubs, most notably at the AS Bon Conseil, one of the many Catholic clubs affiliated with the Gymnastic and Sports Federation of French Patronages (FGSPF), then presided by Charles Simon. He had a younger brother, Elie Barat, and both resided at the Avenue de Ségur in the 7th arrondissement of Paris, where the AS Bon Conseil club is still located today.

On 28 May 1905, the 16-year-old Barat engaged in a shot put competition at the patronage championships, in which his fellow international Ernest Tossier, only a year younger, also participated.

== Playing career ==
Barat was playing in Conseil's football team as early as January 1906. On 20 January 1907, Barat played for an FGSPF team made up of the best players from the patronages in a friendly match against the English club North London AFC, helping his side to a 4–2 win. Despite being one of the best players from the patronages around 1906–08, Barat was not called up for the French national team because the national coach of the time, the northerner André Billy of USFSA, preferred players from the Nord. When the USFSA was replaced by Simon's CFI, however, he was immediately called up for the first two matches of the CFI reign, both in May 1909, in friendlies against Belgium in Brussels and England amateurs in Gentilly, losing on both occasions. Even though the latter match ended in a resounding 0–11 loss, the French newspaper L'Auto (the forerunner of L'Équipe) stated that "Barat was good". He remains one of only three players of Bon Conseil to have represented the French national team, the other two being Félix Julien and goalkeeper Louis Tessier.

Like many French internationals from the start of the 20th century, Barat was the victim of mistakes by historians, being initially confused with a certain Jean-Marie Barat born in Paris on 1 August 1892, which led many historians to wrongly claim that he was the youngest French international in history, at the age of 16 years and 9 months during his international debut in May 1909, as well as one of only two players to have represented the "Bleus" before his 17th birthday, alongside Jules Verbrugge, who was also the victim of a mistake in his civil status; the youngest French international is actually Félix Vial, aged 17 years and 4 months.

== Later life ==
A carpenter by profession, Barat was mobilized at the outbreak of the First World War in August 1914, becoming a sergeant of the 168th Infantry Regiment, and being seriously wounded during the Bois-le-Prêtre fighting in June 1915.

The date of his death remains unknown, which means that it is not known whether he survived the War.
