= Sadi Dastarac =

French footballer

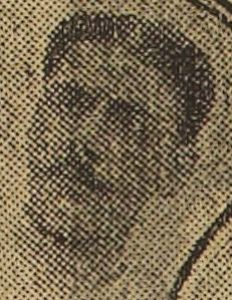
- Sadi Dastarac in 1909

Personal information
- Full name: Centulle Marie Louis Sadi Dastarac
- Date of birth: 14 June 1888
- Place of birth: Saint-Vincent-de-Paul, Landes, France
- Date of death: 2 February 1911 (aged 22)
- Place of death: Lamotte-Beuvron, France
- Position: Midfielder

Senior career*
Years	Team	Apps	(Gls)
1905–1906	Lycée Charlemagne team		
1906–1910	Gallia Club		

International career
1908	France B	1	(0)
1908–1910	Paris	3	(0)
1910	France (unofficial)	1	(0)
- * Club domestic league appearances and goals

Centulle Marie Louis Sadi Dastarac (14 June 1888 – 2 February 1911) was a French footballer who played as a midfielder for Gallia Club, and who competed in the football tournament of the 1908 Olympic Games in London, doing so as a member of the France B squad.

== Early life and education ==
Sadi Dastarac was born on 14 June 1888 in Saint-Vincent-de-Paul, Landes, near Dax, into a large family of ten children, and he was named after the President of the Republic Sadi Carnot, elected in 1887. His father was the director of the Forges de Buglose. He began his football career in Paris in the ranks of the Lycée Charlemagne team (the Carolingian Union), in 1905, and despite his tender age of 17, he was already well-built and of a good height, thus playing as a center forward.

== Playing career ==
Dastarac signed for Gallia Gallia Club in 1906, where he was dropped back into the midfield, and two years later, in 1908, he made a good performance for the Paris football team in its annual matches against Northern France, being described in the French press as "a youngster with great speed and a powerful shot". Later that year, in October 1908, Dastarac was selected for the so-called France B squad that competed in the football tournament of the 1908 Olympic Games in London, in which they were knocked out in the quarter-finals by Denmark (0–9). He played this match as a right-back, and interestingly, the right-back who played with the A team was Georges Bayrou, who was the captain of the same club where Dastarac operated, Gallia.

Despite this, Dastarac was re-selected to play in the Paris-North match of 1909, as well as Paris-London in January 1910, in which he was described as France's best player, "serving Verbrugge and Cyprès quite intelligently". Back in 1908, he was France's fourth choice in his position, behind Maurice Vandendriessche, Charles Wilkes, and Julien du Rhéart, but the first chose Belgian nationality when he reached the age of majority, the second retired in late 1908, and the third got injured in early 1910, so on 12 March 1910, he started for France in an unofficial match against England AFA, which ended in a resounding 0–20 loss.

On 18 April 1909, Dastarac started in the final of the Coupe Dewar in 1909 at Stade de Charentonneau, which ended in a 5–0 win over AS Française. He played his last match on 24 April 1910, during the semifinals of the 1910 Coupe Dewar, which ended in a 3–1 win over Club athlétique de Paris 14. The French press noted his absence in the final, since it weakened Gallia's half-back line in an eventual 1–3 loss to CA Paris.

== Death ==
Later that year, on 4 October 1910, Dastarac appeared before the review board of the military, but he was discharged because of "Pulmonary bacillosis, with considerable weight loss and general weakness". In short, Dastarac had contracted tuberculosis, which was not curable at the time, review board gave him only three months to live. Likewise, on 2 February 1911, at the young age of just 22, Dastarac died in Lamotte-Beuvron, and was then buried at Père Lachaise Cemetery. Some sources state that he died on 2 October 1911, during a rugby match, but this is due to a confusion with another Dastarac, a rugby player.

== Honours ==
Gallia Club

- Coupe Dewar:
  - Champions (1): 1909
  - Runner-up (1): 1910
