= Bayrou =

Bayrou is a surname. Notable people with the surname include:

- François Bayrou (born 1951), French politician
  - Bayrou government, a French government established in 2024
- Georges Bayrou (1883–1953), French footballer
  - Stade Georges-Bayrou (French: George Bayrou Stadium), Stele, France; football stadium named after Georges
- Maurice Bayrou (1905–1996), French politician
