= Félix Julien =

French footballer (1884–1936)

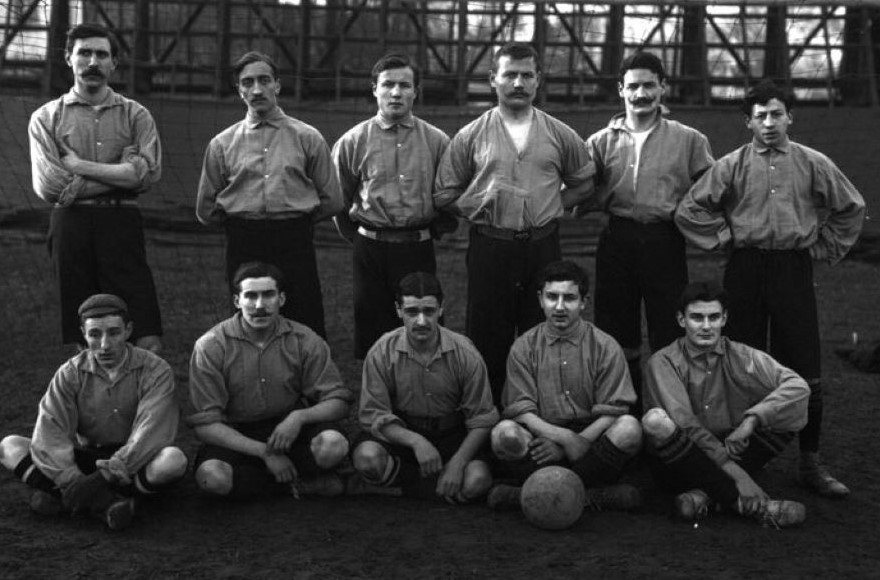
- Julien (squatting, second from right) in 1907

Personal information
- Full name: Félix Jean-Baptiste Julien
- Date of birth: 20 July 1884
- Place of birth: 15th arrondissement of Paris, France
- Date of death: 12 October 1936 (aged 51)
- Place of death: Lorient, France
- Height: 1.70 m (5 ft 7 in)
- Position: Forward

Senior career*
Years	Team	Apps	(Gls)
1905–1910	AS Bon Conseil		

International career
1908	France C	0	(0)
1909	France	2	(0)
- * Club domestic league appearances and goals

Félix Jean-Baptiste Julien (20 July 1884 – 12 October 1936) was a French footballer who played as a forward for AS Bon Conseil and the French national team in 1909.

== Career ==
Born on 20 July 1884 in the 15th arrondissement of Paris, Julien played his entire football career in the patronage clubs, most notably at the AS Bon Conseil, a club in the 7th arrondissement of Paris, which was one of the many Catholic clubs affiliated with the Gymnastic and Sports Federation of French Patronages (FGSPF), then presided by Charles Simon. In addition to football, he also worked as an assistant secretary of the referees' commission in the early 1906. The following year, on 20 January 1907, he played for an FGSPF team made up of the best players from the patronages in a friendly against the English club North London AFC, helping his side to a 4–2 win.

In October 1908, several players from the patronages, including Julien, were selected by the USFSA for the upcoming football tournament of the 1908 Olympic Games, but only as members of the would-be France C squad that was originally listed to compete; none of them traveled to London because the USFSA decided to send only two teams instead of three.

Despite being one of the best players from the patronages around 1906–08, he was not called up for the French national team because the coach of the time, the northerner André Billy of USFSA, preferred players from the Nord. When the USFSA was replaced by Simon's CFI, however, he was immediately called up for the first two matches of the CFI reign, both in May 1909, in friendlies against Belgium in Brussels and England amateurs in Gentilly, losing on both occasions. After the latter match, the French newspaper L'Auto (the forerunner of L'Équipe) stated that he was "not a good dribbler". He remains one of only three players of Bon Conseil to have represented the French national team, the other two being François Barat and goalkeeper Louis Tessier.

== Later life and death ==
On 8 April 1913, Julien, an architect by profession, married Jeanne Mercier in the Saint-Louis church in Lorient. Mobilized at the outbreak of World War I in August 1914, he was serving in the 70th Infantry when he was wounded by a bullet in the chest on 20 November 1914. In 1921, the 37-year-old Julien played a veterans' match.

Julien stayed linked to the Army until June 1936, when he was discharged from the reserve roster due to an intestinal problem, which most likely served as the cause of his death in Lorient on 12 October 1936, at the age of 52. (Note: Some sources have erroneously confused him with another Félix Julien, who was also born in 1884, but on 7 December, in the Paris commune of Corbeil-Essonnes. He belonged to the 69th line regiment, being seriously wounded in January 1915, also by a bullet in the chest, and later dying in Clermont-en-Argonne on 1 March 1915.)
