= Emile Fontaine =

Emile Fontaine or Émile Fontaine may refer to:

- Émile Fontaine (photographer) (1859–1946), French mountaineer and photographer
- Emile Fontaine (footballer) (1880–), French footballer
- Émile Jean-Fontaine, French sailor
