= Schaff =

Schaff is a surname. Notable people with the surname include:

- Adam Schaff, Polish Marxist philosopher
- Albert Schaff (1885–1968), French footballer
- David Schley Schaff (1852–1941), American Presbyterian clergyman and American football pioneer
- Erin Schaff, American photographer and photojournalist
- Gary Schaff (1959–2020), Canadian Paralympic athlete
- Morris Schaff (1840–1929), American Union Army officer and writer
- Philip Schaff (1819–1893), church historian
- William Schaff, artist and musician

== See also ==
- Schaff–Herzog Encyclopedia of Religious Knowledge
