= Raymond Gigot =

French footballer

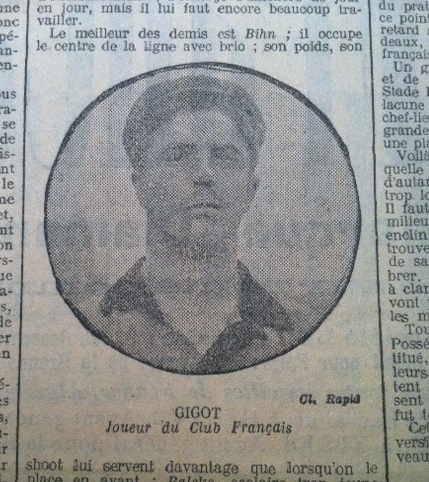
- Gigot in 1910

Personal information
- Full name: Raymond Pierre Gigot
- Date of birth: 11 May 1885
- Place of birth: Perpignan, Pyrenees-Orientales, France
- Date of death: 25 September 1915 (aged 30)
- Place of death: Neuville-Saint-Vaast, France
- Height: 1.65 m (5 ft 5 in)
- Position: Forward

Senior career*
Years	Team	Apps	(Gls)
1904–1905	Club Français		
1905–1906	Stade Français		
1908–1912	Club Français		

International career
1905	France	1	(0)
1908	France B	0	(0)
- * Club domestic league appearances and goals

Raymond Pierre Gigot (11 May 1885 – 25 September 1915) was a French footballer who played as a Forward for Club Français and the French national team in 1904–05.

== Early life ==
Born in Perpignan, Pyrenees-Orientales, on 11 May 1885, Gigot moved with his parents, brother, and sister to Sèvres, Paris, in 1889, living at rue Saint-Pierre. His father, a former soldier who had become a fencing instructor at the Cercle d'escrime de Sèvres, introduced him to fencing, but Gigot was rather eclectic, also practicing athletics and football. Outside football, he was a bank employee.

== Playing career ==
=== Early career ===
Gigot began his football career at Club Français in 1904, aged 19, where he played for only one season, before moving to Stade Français. He was a fast winger, whose game was limited to "going down" the field at full speed along the touchline, and to cross at the end of the run, which was the norm at the time. In April 1904, the club A.S.S. requested the postponement of his third series class match against P.A.C. because of the absence of Gigot, who was playing for Club Français, so the commission of the Paris committee of the USFSA decided that he could not take part in the postponed match either; ignoring this, however, the A.S.S. called Gigot for help anyways, and as a result, the club was hit with a one-month suspension.

=== International call-ups ===
On 7 May 1905, just four days before his 20th birthday, Gigot earned his first (and only) international cap for France in a friendly match against Belgium in Brussels, which ended in a resounding 0–7 loss. Interestingly, he won this selection with a game of musical chairs: Pierre Allemane had failed to get permission to go to Brussels, so it was Marius Royet who took his position of center half, and in turn, Louis Mesnier gave up his place on the wing to play inter, thus allowing Gigot to came in on the right. However, Gigot was rather clumsy, and therefore, in France's next match against the Belgians in 1906, he was only a substitute, and it was another Raymond, Jouve, who was lined up on the right, although he was not at all a winger.

Two years later, Gigot was selected as a reserve for the French B squad that was going to compete in the football tournament of the 1908 Olympic Games, but he ended up not traveling to London, thus avoiding France B's humiliating 0–9 loss to Denmark on 19 October. A week later, on 26 October, Gigot started in the final of the 1908 Coupe Manier at the Stade de Charentonneau, which ended in a 7–2 loss to Red Star.

On one occasion, Gigot refused a selection for the Paris football team in a friendly against a London XI, to play an obscure game in Reims with the Club Français.

=== Later career ===
In November 1910, the journalists of L'Auto (the forerunner of L'Équipe) stated that the 25-year-old "Gigot has lost a little of his value, but he still has a good burst of speed and a serious shot". In 1911, Gigot started in Club Français' opening match of the season against FC Rouen. On 14 April 1912, Gigot started in the final of the Coupe Dewar at Colombes, in which he and Lepage "were the source of great runs"; Français lost 1–3 to Racing Club de France.

In the following year, he started in the final of the 1913 Coupe Dewar, again at Colombes, and again another loss, this time to CA XIVe (4–2), with the local press describing Gigot as the best player of CF's forward line, "making his mark as much for his escapes as for his crosses".

== Later life and death ==
After his marriage in 1912, Gigot moved into his parents' building in Sèvres with his wife Marie-Élise Magnien, and the couple had a child, Jean, born in 1914. At the outbreak of the First World War, he was enlisted as a sergeant in the infantry, and as a good son of a soldier, Gigot was a drill sergeant in Bernay. On 6 July, he was sent to the Western Front with the recruits he had trained, where he was placed in the sector of Neuville-Saint-Vaast, just like his fellow one-time international André Puget, whom he had faced on numerous occasions in the USFSA Paris championship. They did not belong to the same regiment, but they might have crossed paths in the trenches, and while Puget died in May 1915, during the initial assault on the German "Labyrinth" stronghold, located near Neuville-Saint-Vaast, Gigot died on 25 September 1915, during the final and victorious assault on that same stronghold. His body was never found, which means that a shell hit him head-on, and the death was thus not officially registered in Sèvres until October 1918.

== Legacy ==
The city of Sèvres paid tributes to him, engraving his name on the main staircase of the town hall among the other Sévriens who died for France. In the 1920s, an annual foot race called the "Prix Raymond Gigot" was organized in memory of the Sévriens athletes who died on the Field of Honor.

== Honours ==
Club Français

- Coupe Manier:
  - Runner-up (1): 1908
- Coupe Dewar:
  - Runner-up (1): 1912 and 1913
