= Raoul Gressier =

French footballer

Personal information
- Full name: Raoul Daniel Gressier
- Date of birth: 19 November 1885
- Place of birth: Calais, Pas-de-Calais, France
- Date of death: 6 October 1915 (aged 29)
- Place of death: Tahure, Marne, France
- Height: 1.75 m (5 ft 9 in)
- Position: Midfielder

Youth career
- RC Calais

Senior career*
Years	Team	Apps	(Gls)
1902–1906	RC Calais		
1906–1908	Olympique Lillois		
1908–1910	RC Calais		

International career
1908	France B	1	(0)
1909	Northern France	1	(0)
- * Club domestic league appearances and goals

Raoul Daniel Gressier (19 November 1885 – 6 October 1915) was a French footballer who played as a midfielder for Olympique Lillois and the French national team in the early 20th century.

== Playing career ==
Born in Calais on 19 November 1885, Gressier spent most of his career at his hometown club RC Calais, alongside Julien Denis, where he stayed until 1906, when he moved to Olympique Lillois, with whom he played for two seasons, from 1906 to 1908, when he returned to RC Calais. Due to his great height of 1.75 meters (the equivalent of 1.88 meters today), he mostly played at the back, where his game consisted of clearing the ball with powerful kicks, but he was also capable of playing as a half-centre, since he knew how to dribble and passed the ball well.

On 26 May 1907, Gressier started in the final of the Challenge International du Nord, which ended in a 4–0 loss to Union Saint-Gilloise; in the preview of this match, the local press described him as "very enthusiastic, dribbles well, has an excellent shot, but sometimes loses his head and forgets his teammates". In October 1908, the USFSA selected him as a reserve of the France B squad that competed in the football tournament of the 1908 Olympic Games. However, he ended traveling to London as a starter following the last-minute forfeit of Victor Denis, thus earning his first and last international cap in the Olympic quarter-finals against Denmark, which ended in a resounding 0–9 loss. Three months later, in January 1909, the USFSA selected him to the Northern team for the annual Nord-Paris match; the press emphasized that his choice raised criticism.

Outside football, Gressier was a merchant clerk.

== Death ==
A warrant officer in the 310th Regiment Infantry, Gressier died for France during the First World War, disappearing in Tahure, Marne, on 6 October 1915, at the age of 29.

== Honours ==
Olympique Lillois

- Challenge International du Nord:
  - Runner-up (1): 1907

== Bibliography ==
- Perry, Raphaël (2021). Bleus éphémères [Ephemeral blues] (in French). Paris: Hugo Sport. p. 356. ISBN 978-2-7556-9244-0.
