= Ernest Guéguen =

French footballer

Personal information
- Full name: Ernest Francis Marie Guéguen
- Date of birth: 30 May 1885
- Place of birth: Saint-Servan, France
- Date of death: 25 September 1915 (aged 30)
- Place of death: Souain, France
- Height: 1.82 m (6 ft 0 in)
- Position: Forward

Senior career*
Years	Team	Apps	(Gls)
–1906	US Saint-Servan		
1906–1908	Gallia Club		
1908–1914	US Servannaise		

International career
1908	France B	0	(0)
1913	France	1	(0)
- * Club domestic league appearances and goals

Ernest Francis Marie Guéguen (30 May 1885 – 25 September 1915) was a French footballer who played as a forward for US Servannaise and the French national team in the early 1910s.

== Playing career ==
Ernest Guéguen was born in Saint-Servan, Brittany, on 30 May 1885, as the son of a baker. In 1906, the 21-year-old Guéguen left his hometown club US Saint-Servan to join Gallia Club, and in October of that year, Ernest Weber, the star journalist of the French newspaper L'Auto (the forerunner of L'Équipe), stated that he was "very fast, shoots and dribbles well, but above all passes wonderfully, so he will bring the forward line well when his game has been appreciated".

Guéguen was playing for the Gallia Club when the USFSA selected him as a reserve for the French B squad that was going to compete in the football tournament of the 1908 Olympic Games, but he ended up not traveling to London. Nicknamed "the great spring", he was described in the French press as "a solid guy, cut with an axe, topped with a Breton head".

On 27 February 1913, the 27-year-old Guéguen earned his first (and only) international cap for France in a friendly match against England amateurs at Colombes, which ended in a 1–4 loss. In a time when the national team was mainly composed of footballers who played in Paris and Northern teams, Guéguen became the first-ever player from Breton to wear the tricolor jersey. Warned at the last moment, he had to travel all night directly from Brittany, arriving only two hours before kick-off, and then to make matters worse, he immediately took two balls to the face, which earned him a bloody nose, thus being very mediocre at the start, missing everything he attempted, but he improved in the second half, making the assist to André Poullain for his side's only goal, which was greeted with thunderous applause.

== Later life and death ==
A 1st class private of the 247th Infantry Regiment, Guéguen was killed by the enemy in Souain, Marne, during the Second Battle of Champagne, on 25 September 1915, aged 30. Two comrades, including Frédéric Bougeard from Plérin, had to testify to his death to the civil registry.

His surname was associated the following year with a cup contested in Brittany.

== Bibliography ==
- Perry, Raphaël (2021). Bleus éphémères [Ephemeral blues] (in French). Paris: Hugo Sport. p. 43. ISBN 978-2-7556-9244-0.
