= Henri Guerre =

French footballer

Personal information
- Full name: Henri Guerre
- Date of birth: 23 February 1885
- Place of birth: 9th arrondissement of Paris, France
- Date of death: 29 February 1924 (aged 39)
- Place of death: Neuilly-sur-Seine, France
- Height: 1.67 m (5 ft 6 in)
- Position: Defender

Senior career*
Years	Team	Apps	(Gls)
1908–1910	Patronage Olier		

International career
1909	France	1	(0)
- * Club domestic league appearances and goals

Henri Guerre (23 February 1885 – 29 February 1924) was a French footballer who played as a defender for Patronage Olier and the French national team between 1908 and 1910.

== Playing career ==
Henri Guerre was born in 9th arrondissement of Paris on 23 February 1885, and he played his entire football career in the patronage clubs, most notably at the Patronage Olier between 1908 and 1910, one of the many Catholic clubs affiliated with the FGSPF. According to the French press of the time, Guerre was "skillful and sure" and "possessed a long and dangerous shot", and that he "often saved his team from dangerous situations".

Together with the Carlier brothers, Ernest Tossier, and Eugène Maës, he played a crucial role in helping Olier win the FGSPF Football Championship in 1908, and this victory allowed the club to compete in the second edition of the Trophée de France in 1908, an inter-federation national competition organized by the CFI, in which he started in the final as a halfback, helping his side to a 3–0 win over SM de Puteaux, the Parisian champion of the FCAF. He first played halfback, before moving to fullback in 1909 alongside Tossier.

At the time, no provision obliged the clubs to give up their players to the French national team, contrary to the regulations in force at FIFA today; therefore, the Patronage Olier refused to make its players available for France because the club's leaders favored their interests, such as the Trophée de France. However, in October 1908, several PO players, including Guerre and Maës, were selected by the USFSA for the upcoming football tournament of the 1908 Olympic Games, but only as members of the would-be France C squad that was originally listed to compete; none of them traveled to London because the USFSA decided to send only two instead of three teams. A few months later, either Charles Simon, who chaired the CFI, or René Chevalier, who was in charge of the selection of the national team, were able to convince the reluctant PO leaders to give up their defensive pair of fullbacks, Guerre and Tossier, for a friendly match against Uccle in Uccle on 9 May. Along with goalkeeper Louis Tessier, they formed a decent defensive partnership that held up very well, until 10 minutes from the end, during which they conceded four goals due to the fatigue of certain players; France lost 2–5 loss. Guerre and Tossier remain the only players of Patronage Olier to have represented the French national team, probably because the PO leaders did not want to make any other exception.

== Later life and death ==
During the First World War, Guerre, which means "War" in French, collected the Croix de Guerre and the Legion of Honour, displaying a fiery character of leader of men, which must also have been expressed during his days on a football field.

At the time, every soldier, although demobilized and returned to civilian life, had to complete periods of military exercises, and on 4 February 1924, Guerre was promoted to reserve lieutenant. Just three weeks later, however, Guerre died in Neuilly-sur-Seine on 29 February 1924, at the young age of 39, most likely due to having been poisoned by a colleague who got jealous of his promotion.

== Honours ==
Patronage Olier

- FGSPF Football Championship:
  - Champion (1): 1908
- Trophée de France:
  - Champion (1): 1908
