= Étienne Morillon (footballer) =

French footballer

Personal information
- Place of birth: France
- Position: Defender

Senior career*
Years	Team	Apps	(Gls)
1905–1910	Red Star AC		

International career
1908	France B	0	(0)
- * Club domestic league appearances and goals

Étienne Morillon was a French footballer who played as a defender for Red Star AC. He was a member of the French B squad that competed in the football tournament of the 1908 Olympic Games in London, but he withdrew at the last moment.

== Biography ==
Very little is known about his life; Morillon was playing football for Red Star as soon as October 1905. Three years later, in 1908, the USFSA selected both him and fellow club teammate René Fenouillère for the French squads that competed in the football tournament of the 1908 Olympic Games in London. However, Morillon never made the trip across the English Channel because he decided to withdraw at the last moment, so he was replaced by Justin Vialaret, who started in the quarter-finals as France B lost 9–0 to Denmark on 19 October. A week later, on 26 October, Morillon started in the final of the 1908 Coupe Manier at the Stade de Charentonneau, helping his side to a 7–2 victory over Club français. He was still playing for Red Star as late as March 1910.

After World War I, Morillon was one of the first players to revive the Red Star club. Having retired from football, he took part in the 35th Bordeaux–Paris race in 1929.

== Honours ==
Red Star AC

- Coupe Manier:
  - Champions (1): 1908
