= Emile Fontaine (footballer) =

French footballer

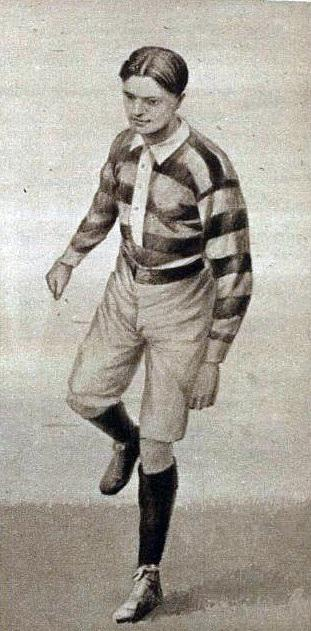
- Émile Fontaine, French football champion in 1905, with the Gallia Club.

Personal information
- Date of birth: 2 May 1880
- Place of birth: Saint-Pierre, Réunion, France
- Position: Defender

Senior career*
Years	Team	Apps	(Gls)
1901–1903	FEC Levallois		
1903–1905	Gallia Club		
1905–1908	Olympique Lillois		
1908–1910	Gallia Club		

International career
1904–1908	France	0	(0)
- * Club domestic league appearances and goals

Emile Fontaine (2 May 1880 – unknown) was a French footballer who played as a defender for Olympique Lillois.

== Early career ==
Emile Fontaine was born on 2 May 1880 in Saint-Pierre, Réunion, as the youngest of nine brothers from the marriage between André Célestin Fontaine (1834–1883) and Marie Josèphe Smith (1838–).

== Playing career ==
=== Early career ===
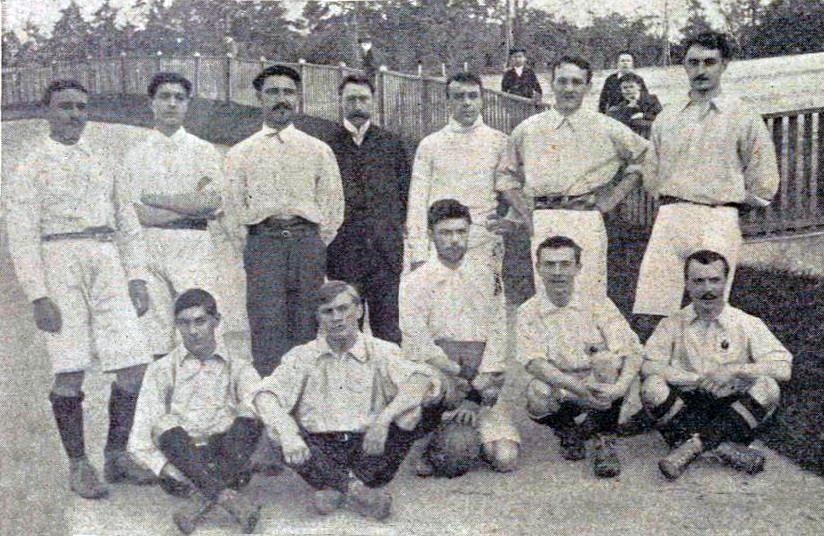
The 1903 Gallia winning squad on Sunday 8 November 1903.

At some point during the turn of the century (1899–1901), Fontaine arrived in Paris, where he quickly became the captain of FEC Levallois as early as February 1903, aged 22. Later that year, he joined the ranks of Gallia Club, where he also became the club's captain by 1904, aged 24. On 8 November 1903, Fontaine started in the final of the Coupe Manier in 1903 in Vincennes, in which he made a crucial tackle to prevent a goal from Nicolet to keep the match tied at 2 in an eventual extra-time victory (3–2) over CA Paris.

=== The 12th man in the inaugural match ===
In March and April 1904, Fontaine played two matches at the Parc des Princes for an unofficial French national team, namely against Southampton (0–11) and Corinthian (4–11).

Fontaine was one of the 12 players taken to Brussels to play in France's first-ever official match against Belgium on 1 May 1904, but the national coach Robert Guérin decided to sort out who would play between him and Georges Bilot, and the latter won, so he was thus the 12th man of the first match in a time when substitutions did not exist. Another source states that Fontaine became the 12th man after losing a draw in the locker room to Jacques Davy. (Note: Some sources wrongly state that he played in the inaugural match alongside Davy.) Fontaine never became an international, because he then refused selection for the return match in 1905, when he was scheduled to start ahead of Bilot; without him, France conceded 10 goals in the two matches against the Belgians, including a humiliating 0–7 loss.

=== Later career ===
In 1905, Fontaine helped the Gallia Club win the USFSA Paris championship, and this victory qualified the club for the USFSA national championship, where at the semifinals against Amiens in Toulouse on 9 April, he assisted once to help his side to a 5–0 win. He was then decisive in Gallia's victory in the final, not only as captain, but also as a defender, because he and his defensive partner Georges Bayrou kept a clean-sheet for over two and a half hours until a goal was finally scored around the fifth period of extra-time. He then signed for Olympique Lillois, with whom he played for three years until 1908, when he decided to return to Gallia. In 1908, he was selected for the French squad that was going to compete in the football tournament of the 1908 Olympic Games in London, but Fontaine was unavailable due to military service.

On 18 April 1909, Fontaine started in the final of the Coupe Dewar in 1909 at Stade de Charentonneau, which ended in a 5–0 win over AS Française. On 8 May 1910, he started in the final of the 1910 Coupe Dewar, which ended in a 1–3 loss to CA Paris.

== Later life ==
After the First World War, Fontaine became the director of a car body shop in Paris.

== Honours ==
Gallia Club

- USFSA Paris Championship:
  - Champions (1): 1904–05
- USFSA Football Championship:
  - Champions (1): 1905
- Coupe Manier:
  - Champions (1): 1903
- Coupe Dewar:
  - Champions (1): 1909
  - Runner-up (1): 1910
