= Julien Denis =

French footballer (1886–1914)

Personal information
- Full name: Julien Florentin Denis
- Date of birth: 20 March 1886
- Place of birth: La Gorgue, France
- Date of death: 15 August 1914 (aged 28)
- Place of death: Dinant, Belgium
- Height: 1.62 m (5 ft 4 in)
- Position: Midfielder

Youth career
- RC Calais

Senior career*
Years	Team	Apps	(Gls)
1904–1914	RC Calais		

International career
1908	France B	1	(0)
1909–1910	Northern France	2	(0)
- * Club domestic league appearances and goals

Julien Florentin Denis (20 March 1886 – 15 August 1914) was a French footballer who played as a midfielder for RC Calais and the French national team in the early 20th century.

== Early life and education ==
Born in the Nord town of La Gorgue on 20 March 1886, Denis and his brother Victor began playing football at the Gombert college in Fournes-en-Weppes, just like his fellow future internationals Maurice Gravelines, Gabriel Hanot, and Charles Montagne.

== Career ==
Unlike his brother, Denis spent his entire career at RC Calais, a club that only competed in the Maritime Championship, one of the two regional championships in Northern France, the other being the land Championship, with both winners facing each other in a final. Calais therefore usually played against Dunkerque FC and its main rivals Boulogne. Basically, these three teams played in a closed environment, so international football was far from their concerns, but his performance for the Northerners in the Paris-Nord meeting of 1908, which served as annual test matches for the French national team, convinced France's head coach, the Northerner André Billy, to give him a chance in a friendly against England amateurs in London on 23 March 1908, which ended in a resounding 0–12 loss.

Two months later, on 10 May 1908, Denis earned his second and final caps in a friendly against the Netherlands at Rotterdam, seemingly sustaining an injury in the first half; even though substitutions were allowed at the time, the Dutch captain allowed it, being thus replaced in the 55th minute by his brother Victor, a feat that remained unmatched for over a century, being only repeated in 2022, when Théo Hernandez was replaced by his brother Lucas in a World Cup match against Australia. This unauthorized change caused controversy at the time, with authorities suspecting that Julien had faked it to allow his brother to make his international debut, and likewise, in 1949, over 40 years later, Victor, who had become a renowned sports journalist, admitted that there had indeed been a simulation, doing so on the occasion of another France-Netherlands match, also played in Rotterdam.

In October 1908, the USFSA selected him as a reserve of the France B squad that competed in the football tournament of the 1908 Olympic Games, but he ended up not traveling to London. Three months later, in January 1909, he played in another Nord-Paris match, in which he "was far superior to the others"; the match ended in a draw.

On one occasion, the press described him as being "strong as a Turk, better in defense than in attack", and highlighted his leadership and his ability to galvanize his team. According to his teammate Gabriel HanotDespite his height of 1.62 meters, he had a "sensational" heading game, a, a and great ardor; according to his other teammate at CASG Edgar Lenglet, he "possessed the precious gift of attracting his opponents to him, only making his pass when his forwards had a clear path."

== Death and legacy ==
A sergeant-major in the 8th Infantry Regiment during the First World War, Denis died on 15 August 1914, on the first day of the Battle of Dinant in Belgium. In doing so, he became the very first French international to be killed in the War. The home stadium of RC Calais, currently located on the Avenue Saint-Exupéry, was renamed in his honor.

== Bibliography ==
- Perry, Raphaël (2021). Bleus éphémères [Ephemeral blues] (in French). Paris: Hugo Sport. p. 356. ISBN 978-2-7556-9244-0.
