= Justin Vialaret =

French footballer

Personal information
- Full name: Justin Pierre Vialaret
- Date of birth: 12 November 1883
- Place of birth: Millau, Aveyron, France
- Date of death: 30 September 1916 (aged 32)
- Place of death: Marcelcave, Somme, France
- Position: Midfielder

Senior career*
Years	Team	Apps	(Gls)
1901–1907	ES Parisienne		
1907–1910	Club athlétique de Paris 14		

International career
1908	France B	1	(0)
- * Club domestic league appearances and goals

Justin Pierre Vialaret (12 November 1883 – 30 September 1916) was a French footballer who played as a midfielder for Club athlétique de Paris 14, and who competed in the football tournament of the 1908 Olympic Games in London, doing so as a member of the France B squad.

== Playing career ==
Justin Vialaret was born in Millau, Aveyron, on 12 November 1883. When he was still a child, his parents moved to Paris, where he began his career at Etoile sportive Parisienne in 1901, aged 18. He later became the club's president, secretary, and even treasurer, in turn or even simultaneously.

Vialaret was a midfielder who was also capable of playing forward since his abilities were rather offensive, having a solid kick and being "always dangerous", to the point that the French press even acknowledged that "he shoots too much". In 1907, he moved to Club athlétique de Paris 14, a club in the 14th arrondissement of Paris, which included a few future internationals, such as Émilien Devic, Pol Morel, and Eugène Petel. In October 1908, the USFSA selected him as a reserve of the France B squad that competed in the football tournament of the 1908 Olympic Games. However, he ended traveling to London as a starter following the last-minute forfeit of Étienne Morillon, thus earning his first and last international cap in the Olympic quarter-finals against Denmark, which ended in a resounding 0–9 loss. He played this match as a wing-half, being responsible for neutralizing Danish winger Oskar Nørland, who did not score a single one of the 9 goals conceded by the Blues, which partly relieves Vialaret of the responsibility for the crushing defeat. Of the 26 French players who made the trip to London, Vialaret was the only one from a Parisian club.

Vialaret seems to have given up football shortly after his marriage in 1910, so his mark on French football is rather thin. Outside of football, he was a commercial employee.

== Later life and death ==
Despite benefiting from a temporary military exemption as the only son of a widow, Vialaret was incorporated into the 89th RI at the start of the First World War. On 20 September 1914, during the Battle of Verdun, Vialaret, now a quartermaster corporal in the 46th Infantry Regiment, was hit in the shoulder by a shell fragment, but he was only evacuated five days later, to the Marcelcave evacuation hospital in Somme, where he died on 30 September, at the age of 32, perhaps as a result of infection from his initially poorly treated wound.

== See also ==
List of Olympians killed in World War I
