= Zacharie Baton =

French footballer

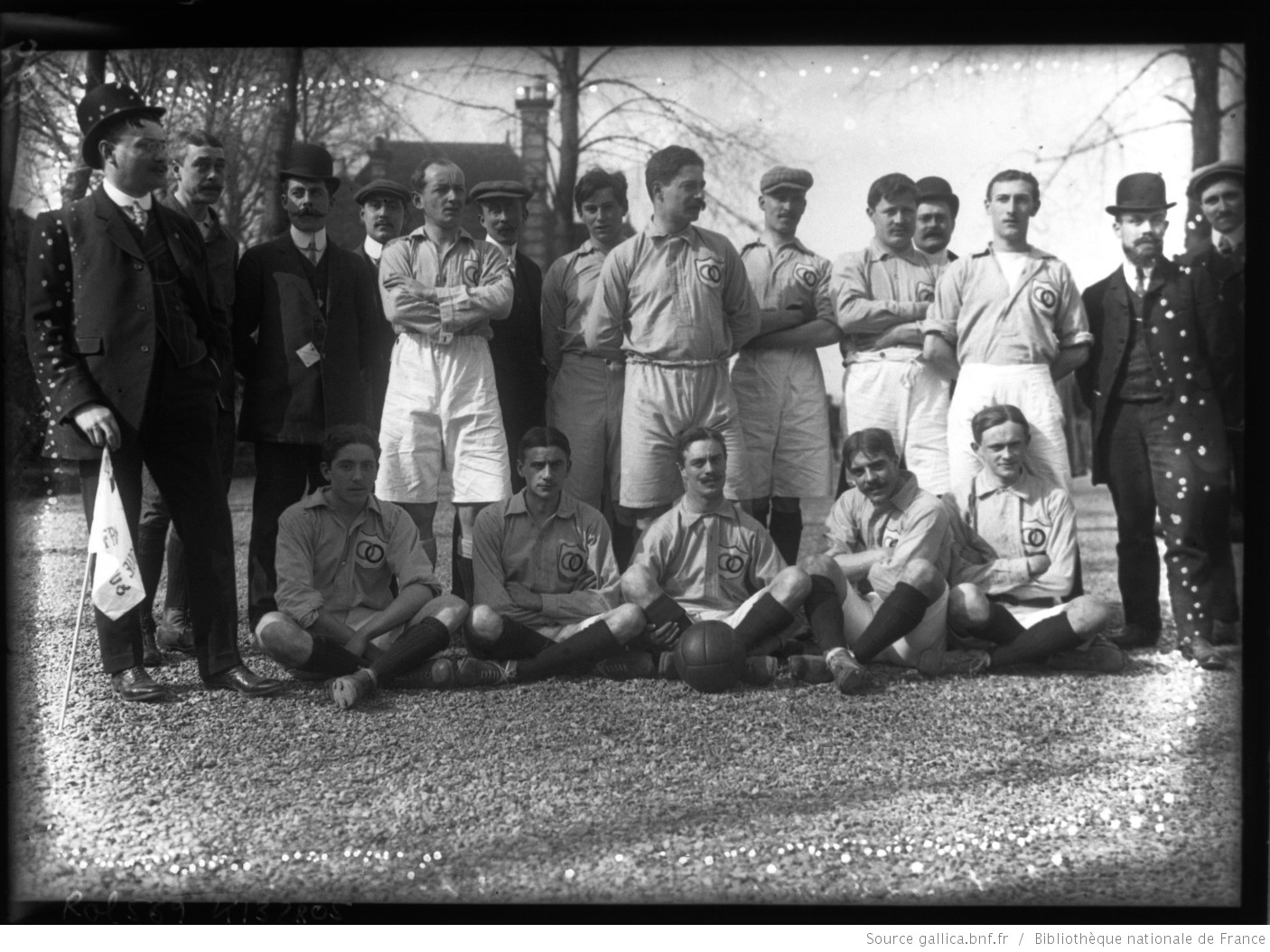
- Zacharie Baton (standing, wearing a cap) and the French national team in 1908.

Personal information
- Full name: Zacharie Théodore Baton
- Date of birth: 20 September 1886
- Place of birth: Arras, Pas-de-Calais, France
- Date of death: 21 February 1925 (aged 38)
- Place of death: Lompnas, Ain, France
- Height: 1.76 m (5 ft 9 in)
- Position: Goalkeeper

Youth career
- 1900–1902: Racing Club d'Arras

Senior career*
Years	Team	Apps	(Gls)
1902–1903	Racing Club d'Arras		
1903–1909	Olympique Lillois		
1909–1914	Racing Club d'Arras		

International career
1906–1908	France	4	(0)
1907	Northern France	+1	(0)
1909	France (UIAFA)	1	(0)
- * Club domestic league appearances and goals

Zacharie Théodore Baton (20 September 1886 – 21 February 1925) was a French footballer who played as a goalkeeper for Olympique Lillois and the French national team in the early 20th century.

== Early life and education ==
Zacharie Baton was born in Arras, Pas-de-Calais, on 20 September 1886, as the son of Alphonse Charles Zacharie Baton, a locksmith. Most of his family bears the first name of Zacharie, and likewise, one of his uncles, Zacharie Constant Théodore Baton, was a well-known painter.

== Playing career ==
=== Early career ===
Baton began playing in the youth ranks of his hometown club Racing Club d'Arras, eventually reaching the first team in 1902, aged 15. In 1903, the 16-year-old Baton was approached by a member of the USFSA Association Commission, André Billy, who had traveled from Lille to Arras to personally convince his parents, as well as the director of the college where young Zacharie was studying as a boarder, to let him come every weekend to Lille to guard the goals of Olympique Lillois, the club that Billy had co-founded in March 1902. Eventually, he moved to Lille full-time, doing so for professional reasons, being a slightly qualified employee who had time to devote himself to sporting activities.

=== Olympique Lillois ===
Baton quickly established himself as OL's starting goalkeeper, making a name for himself in 1905, during a 0–4 loss to Paris-based Racing Club de France, in which "Baton was simply marvelous, his goal was literally bombarded". On 28 April 1907, Baton started in the final of the 1907 Coupe Dewar, which ended in a 2–0 loss to Racing Club de France.

Throughout the following years, the French press constantly praised his performances and he became a unanimous player who was very rarely criticized, an impressive feat for that time. For instance, the journalists of the French newspaper L'Auto (the forerunner of L'Équipe) described him as "a classy player, skillful, very cool, and possessing a remarkable eye", and also "supple as a cat, skillful as a monkey, his long arms are everywhere the ball comes, and with that an imperturbable composure".

At the time, the goalkeepers would never leave their goal, only rarely advancing to the 6 meters line, but Baton used to "relax" at the top of that line, which allowed him to cover the entirety of his goal, especially thanks to his height of 1.76 meters, which was 13 centimeters taller than the average at the time. Furthermore, at the time, the goalkeeper rarely used his hands, being thus considered an outfield player without any particular qualities, but Baton preferred to use his hands, being praised by the press for having such an idea.

=== International career ===
In late 1906, Baton received his first call-up for the French national team thanks to his president Billy, who became France's second-ever coach following the withdrawal of Robert Guérin, while Baton became France's third goalkeeper after Maurice Guichard and Georges Crozier. He made his international debut on 1 November 1906, in a friendly match against England amateurs at the Parc de Princes in Paris, conceding 15 goals in a resounding 0–15 loss, which still is the heaviest defeat in the history of the French national team. This performance put his international career at risk, but he was able to regain everyone's trust in the 1907 Nord-Paris meeting, which served as annual test matches for the French national team, as he helped Nord to a 4–1 win.

In his second and third appearances for France, Baton helped his side achieve victories 2–1 away victories over Belgium and Switzerland, the latter on 8 March 1908. Due to his military service, Baton was not always available in 1908, thus avoiding some historic thrashings, including a 0–12 loss inflicted by the English just two weeks later, on 23 March, and then in October, he was once again unavailable to honor USFSA's selection for the French B squad that competed in the football tournament of the 1908 Olympic Games in London, which ended up being knocked out in the quarter-finals by Denmark 0–9. Baton earned his fourth and last international cap against Belgium on 12 April 1908, which ended in a 1–2 loss.

On 18 March 1909, Billy called up Baton for one last international match, but this time unofficial, because it was under the UIAFA, a short-lived international federation set up by Billy which served as a rival to FIFA. In this match, UIAFA's France faced AFA's England in Colombes, which ended in a 0–8 loss. He is thus the third worst goalkeeper of UIAFA's France, only behind Guy de Gastyne (14 in 4 matches) and Maurice Tilliette (20 in one match).

=== Racing Club d'Arras ===
After completing his military service in September 1909, Baton left Lille and OL to return to his homeland and to his childhood club, Racing Club d'Arras, where he interestingly gave up his place in goal to his "pupil" (it is clearly stated that he was the one who trained him), Louis Bournonville, becoming an outfield player, specifically at the half-center position, which at the time was the only position that was both defensive and offensive. He was not only the team captain until 1914, instructing his teammates on certain specificities of the game, but also a member of the editorial board of the French newspaper La Vie Sportive du Nord, where he signed many articles, including an interview in which he recounts his childhood and first steps in football.

Baton also practiced athletics assiduously in the summer, like many footballers at the time. He was also a field hockey goalkeeper.

== Military career ==
Mobilized at the outbreak of the First World War in August 1914, Baton joined a regiment near Ville-au-Bois, where he was wounded in November 1914. Demobilised, he was called up again, due to the lack of men, this time he was sent to the Dardanelles front in September 1915, where he joined the French Army of the Orient, in Serbia. In November 1915, he was wounded by 4 bullets and a bayonet blow during the attack on a village by the Bulgarians, who then picked him up and treated him in Uskub (currently Skopje, in North Macedonia) before taking him prisoner. Rather than being content to remain wisely in his prison camp and wait for the end of hostilities, he instead tried to escape, being wounded again, this time seriously as it became necessary to amputate his left arm in its upper third while he was in captivity. (Note: Some sources wrongly state that he lost a leg instead of the arm.)

Baton was then transferred to a prison camp in Bulgaria, in Plovdiv, which was inspected by the Swiss Red Cross, and during their visit on 9 May 1917, they reported that, out of 7,647 prisoners, there were 278 French, including 9 officers, with Baton being one of them; they were housed in two-story barracks, slept on straw mattresses, and the able-bodied worked in the fields, which was not the case for Baton. Three months later, on 28 August, Baton was repatriated to France by the Swiss, but despite being one-armed, he asked to serve anyway, since the war was not over. He was thus assigned to an artillery service, and was later seconded to the Telegraph Control of Brest until the Armistice of 11 November 1918.

Baton was considered a war hero in his country, and likewise, in April 1918, he was made a Knight of the Legion of Honour as a second lieutenant in the 284th Infantry Regiment. As a seriously disabled war veteran, Baton was attached to the Ministry of Finance in Paris in 1919.

== Death ==
Baton died in Lompnas, a village in Ain, located about 50 kilometers from Lyon, on 21 February 1925, at the age of 38. (Note: Some sources wrongly state that he died in the 9th arrondissement of Paris, probably due to a confusion with his uncle Zacharie Baton, who had died there just a month earlier, in January 1925.) It remains unclear whether he was buried in Lompnas or repatriated to Arras, as well as the reasons that led him to move to Lompnas, since he was domiciled in Ivry-sur-Seine in 1923, but it was most likely because he knew that his death was imminent, having been weakened by a condition caused by his injuries during the war, and thus wanted to pass away in a peaceful place. In November 1925, the French newspaper Le Miroir des sports published an article about the current whereabouts of several pre-war players, and it stated that "Baton, seriously wounded in the war in Salonika, died recently".

In 1928, Arras hosted the "Zacharie Baton challenge" in athletics, which proves that he was not (yet) forgotten in Arras. It is often said that Pierre Chayriguès was the first world-class French goalkeeper, but some recent historians, such as Pierre Cazal, have stated that Baton is an equally worthy holder of this title.

== Honours ==
Olympique Lillois

- Coupe Dewar:
  - Runner-up (1): 1907
