= André Billy (footballer) =

French footballer and manager (1877–1913)

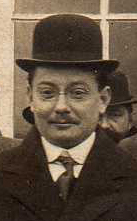
- Billy in 1900

Personal information
- Birth name: André Billy
- Date of birth: 13 May 1877
- Place of birth: Bazeilles, Ardennes, France
- Date of death: 9 August 1913 (aged 36)
- Place of death: Saint-Gervais, France
- Position: Midfielder

Senior career*
Years	Team	Apps	(Gls)
1902–1903	Olympique Lillois		

Managerial career
- 1906–1908: Northern France
- 1906–1908: France (1)
Vice-president of the USFSA
In office 1906–1909
President of Olympique Lillois
In office 1907–1911
Preceded by	André Nicodème
Succeeded by	Henri Jooris
Secretary of UIAFA
In office 1909–1911
- * Club domestic league appearances and goals

André Billy (13 May 1877 – 9 August 1913) was a French footballer and sports leader, who is widely regarded as one of the most important figures in the amateur beginnings of Olympique Lillois, being one of its founders in 1902, and then serving the club as its first captain from 1902 to 1903 and later as president from 1907 to 1911.

He also served as the vice president of the Northern Committee of the USFSA (1906–08), and was the president of the central commission of Football Association (1906–08), and as such, he co-managed the matches of the French national team between 1906 and 1908. However, he is best known for being the main responsible behind the separation of the USFSA, which had governed football in France since 1894, from FIFA, in 1908, due to his intransigence on international amateurism.

== Early life ==
André Billy was born in Bazeilles, Ardennes, on 13 May 1877, as the son of Joseph Omer Billy (1845–1920), a grain and flour trader, and a Mill operator in La Moncelle, and of Augustine Orphise Naudin (1844–1927). He was the youngest of four siblings, including two older brothers Jean Baptiste (who died shortly after its birth in 1872) and Stéphen, and one older sister, Agnes Thérèse Marthe Billy, who died in 1879.

== Professional career ==
After studying at the Collège de Sedan, Billy moved to Lille in 1897. A tireless worker with a clear-sighted intelligence, he knew how to immediately give a vigorous boost to the grain brokerage business that he had created, and once he became rich and reached a comfortable situation, Billy began devoting all his leisure time to sport.

At the turn of the century, Billy had become the director of the Compagnie Française de Stérilisation des Flours in Lille, and an advisor to foreign trade in France.

== Playing career ==
Billy first practiced football and running at the Stade Jules Lemaire, which was inaugurated in 1901, and in March of the following year, he was one of the industrialists and traders from Lille who took the initiative to found Olympique Lillois, a multi-sports club with sports sections devoted to basketball, tennis, rugby union, field hockey, and most notably, football. At the club's founding meeting, Billy was named the team captain of its first team, and on 4 January 1903, he started as a midfielder for OL in the final of the 1902 Coupe Manier at Le Vésinet, playing alongside the likes of Louis Schubart in an eventual 7–0 loss to Club Français.

In the summer of 1903, Billy, already a member of the Association Commission of the USFSA, traveled from Lille to Arras to personally meet the goalkeeper of the local college team, the 16-year-old Zacharie Baton, convincing both his parents and the director of the college to let him come every weekend to Lille to guard the goals of Olympique Lillois. He seems to have retired from the playing fields in 1903, but six years later, in April 1909, a certain "A. Billy" played as a midfielder for JA Saint-Ouen; however, this Billy was a different person because on that same day, he was an assistant referee to Albert Collier in the final of the 1909 USFSA Football Championship.

== Managerial career ==
Between 1904 and 1908, the selection of the French national team was made in principle by the central commission of Football Association, but in reality by influential personalities, such as André Espir and Billy, the latter being the president of said commission. The duo of Espir and Billy co-managed France between 1906 and 1908, having replaced Robert Guérin, who was the first manager of the French team from 1904 to 1906. In that same year, Billy, who had also become the vice-president of the Northern Committee of the USFSA, began organizing annual meetings between the football teams of Paris and Northern France, which served as a sort of test match for the French national team, where players attempted to impress Billy and thus earn their first international caps.

=== 1906 ===
During the years of Guérin, the French team was largely made up of only Parisians, but under Billy, the Northerners made their entrance on a large scale, thus suddenly "de-Parisianized" the selection. In his first game in charge, a friendly match against Belgium in April 1906, Billy only debuted one player from the North, his former teammate Schubart, but France lost 0–5, so in the next match, against the powerful England Amateurs, he debuted four players, three of which from the North, including the RC Roubaix strikers Émile Sartorius and André François, and Olympique Lillois goalkeeper Baton, who conceded a record-breaking 15 goals, a record that still stands.

Ahead of his debut against Belgium, Billy asked for help from Espir and the journalist Ernest Weber, the correspondent for the French newspaper L'Auto (the forerunner of L'Équipe), since both had been very present in France's locker room since the beginning, and had thus watched the previous two Franco-Belgian meetings. Indeed, they had noted that Belgian's full-back Edgard Poelmans constantly delivered precise passes to his forwards, so he had the idea of intercepting them, an excellent avant-garde idea that never came to fruition because the captain of the French team, Pierre Allemane, forgot to give France's winger Raymond Jouve the instructions he had received from Billy: to mark and hinder Poelmans; France lost 0–5. If this had been done, Jouve would have become the first international player theoretically responsible for applying individual gegenpressing, a first in terms of tactics.

=== 1907 and 1908 ===
The 1907 Paris-Nord match caused rivers of ink to flow, initially with the discussion of its purpose, then the rules of the challenge, the dates, the formation of the teams, and then came successive postponements for major reasons, which resulted in Billy ultimately canceling it on 4 April in order to focus in the upcoming Franco-Belgian match, stating: "I have done my best to give the Paris-Nord match a serious organization and solid foundations. I will tell you frankly that I regret very much that all the troubles and all the difficulties have come from Paris". Three days later, on 7 April, he attended the final of the 1907 USFSA Football Championship between RC France and RC Roubaix, in which he approached one of the correspondents for L'Auto, grabbing him "by a button on his coat", to explain that he canceled his Paris-Nord match because his ideal had not been achieved and "that the players from the North are better than those from Paris, and that they will demonstrate this shortly". And indeed, the Paris-Nord match ended up being held, and Georges Bon scored a goal to help the Northerners win 4–1, so Billy decided to give him his first (and only) cap in a friendly against Belgium at Uccle on 21 April 1907, in which Bon helped France achieve its first-ever away win by contributing to France's winning goal (2–1).

In 1908, Billy oversaw France in four matches, which ended in three defeats and only one 1–2 away victory over Switzerland on 8 March. Between 1906 and 1908, Billy selected AS Française midfielder Jean Zimmermann five times, but never took him out of the bench.

== Sports managerial career ==
=== Screw up with FIFA ===
Billy kept rising through the ranks of Olympique Lillois, becoming its secretary-general around 1905, and then its president in 1907, following the resignation of André Nicodème. In the following year, on 27 April 1908, Billy took advantage of an unofficial match between Northern France and England AFA in Tourcoing, which had been authorized by the USFSA, to meet up with Mr. Févez, the president of the Amateur Football Alliance (AFA).

At the FIFA Congress held in Vienna on 7 and 8 June 1908, the USFSA was represented by Billy, a fervent defender of amateurism, thus voting in favor of the AFA becoming a member of FIFA, which defended professionalization; the USFSA was the only who voted for the AFA, whose appeal for membership was thus refused. This vote meant that the USFSA found itself isolated, but Billy believed that he could carry out a putsch at FIFA, so he resigned with the faith that he would take a lot of foreign support with him; however, not many followed him, and the vacated place was quickly seized by Charles Simon's CFI, but the northern clubs remained loyal to the USFSA, which was now deprived of its international relations. In the following years, this event was quickly labeled in the French press as the "famous Billy blunder".

Because of this, France ended up sending two teams to the 1908 Olympic Games, one controlled by the CFI/FIFA and the other by USFSA, with Billy being the coach of the latter, which had a few northerners, such as Fernand Desrousseaux, Adrien Filez, and Georges Prouvost, and even though they were knocked out in the quarter-finals following a resounding 9–0 loss to Denmark, the CFI's side performed even worse, losing 17–1 to Denmark.

=== UIAFA ===
At the end of September 1908, Olympique Lillois made a trip to Prague, where Billy, USFSA's vice president, met the leaders of Bohemia as well as some of the AFA who had also made the trip, to discuss the idea of an international federation of amateurs. Excellent relations were established during these meetings and thus, on 13 December 1908, with the help of Fevez and Victor Schneider, these three federations founded the UIAFA, whose primary objective was to defend the values of amateurism, and which was officially established in Paris on 18 March 1909, with the Frenchman Billy as secretary. On that same day, UIAFA organized its first-ever international match in Colombes, between England AFA and France, which was selected by Billy, who once again chose Baton as its goalkeeper, who again conceded several goals on his debut in an eventual 0–8 loss. Despite the failure of the Vienna Congress, Billy was convinced that Switzerland would join the UIAFA, which eventually happened, but only two years later.

This new federation allowed Billy to initially retain the confidence of the association football committee of the USFSA, but he was still outvoted in the elections of May 1909 and forced to resign due to the grievances related to the disastrous resignation of FIFA. He felt betrayed by his former second-in-command, André Espir, who had become president of the said committee in his place, which meant that Espir was now the sole manager of UIAFA's France, which played unofficial matches with the likes of the AFA. In order to achieve a little personal revenge, Billy weakened UIAFA's France by refusing to allow OL's footballers to play for them (Bacrot, Eloy, Montagne), on the pretext that, "intoxicated" by their selection, they had not given their best in the championship. This decision had the desired outcome since Espir's team was humiliated by the England AFA on 12 March 1910, losing 20–0.

=== President of Olympique Lillois ===
Having become OL's president in 1907, his role as the vice president of the USFSA greatly facilitated the integration of OL into the "Olympic" dynamic. Shortly after taking over the club, OL reached the final of the Coupe Dewar in 1907, and following its postponement by three weeks, he demanded the original date to be maintained even though the second semifinal had not yet been played; the final was eventually played on 28 April, and OL lost 2–0 to RC France. During his presidency, the club gradually gained momentum, winning several regional titles and achieving prestigious successes during friendly matches against Belgian and Parisian clubs, claiming victories in Antwerp, Marseille, Frankfurt, England, and even Luxembourg.

In late 1910, Billy's presidency began to be challenged by Henri Jooris, a powerful industrialist whose ideas frequently opposed those of the Lillois president, so much so, that the two leaders had a falling out and nearly fought a duel. On 19 February 1911, Billy and Jooris witnessed OL win the first title of its history, the USFSA Northern Championship, following a 3–0 victory over RC Roubaix, thus finally putting an end to the invincibility of Roubaix and US Tourquennoise, but despite the club's success, he lost the loyalty of OL's board of directors to Jooris, who was named the club's new secretary-general, a position until then occupied by Billy's friend and former teammate, Louis Schubart. This caused Billy to slam the door on OL, and went on to create a rival club in 1912, Club Lillois, but despite taking half the team with him, this club had an ephemeral life, because it was around this time that he became ill with tuberculosis, which made it impossible for him to guide the club properly. Interestingly, his friend Schubart was not involved in the creation of this club, unlike Georges Veilletet, who was part of OL's 1902 half-back line.

To perpetuate OL at the top of regional football, Jooris, now alone, organized matches across Europe, and in 1912, he took up Billy's idea of the Paris-Nord matches by creating the Lions of Flanders, a selection of players from the biggest clubs in the Nord.

== Death ==
Billy died in Saint-Gervais on 9 August 1913, at the young age of 36, and was buried four days later on 13 August. The local press stated that he had been fighting tuberculosis for eighteen months, but "surely he had in himself that faith, sometimes exaggerated, that he also had in his sporting work and which cost him irremediable errors".

== Reputation ==
Throughout his sporting career, the will and energy that had helped Billy in his professional and business affairs began to gradually become exasperated into an intransigence that did not admit contradiction, which earned him several real "headbutts" that often led to his resignations, first from the USFSA in 1909, and then from OL in 1911. After his death, some local journalists stated that "his work had been disastrous to OL, whose great destiny he ultimately hindered by his intransigence, after having made it a success". Similarly, they praised him as "the man to whom we owe the most the extension of our international relations in the sport of football", something which he also ultimately hindered when he slammed the door on FIFA in 1908.

Due to the excessive authority that he carried with him everywhere, Billy was nicknamed l'Empereur ("the Imperial"), or even the "Napoleon of football", and indeed, he fought many "battles", and afterwards, he would gather "his" men in front of countless beers and, like a general, would criticize them.

== Honours ==
Olympique Lillois

- Coupe Manier:
  - Runner-up (1): 1902

== Bibliography ==
- Chovaux, Olivier (2001). Cinquante ans de football dans le Pas-De-Calais: Le temps de l'enracinement (Fin XIXe-1940) [Fifty years of football in Pas-De-Calais: The time of rooting (End of the 19th century-1940)] (in French). Paris: Artois Presses Université. ISBN 9782848324074.
