= Henri Holgard =

French footballer (1884-1927)

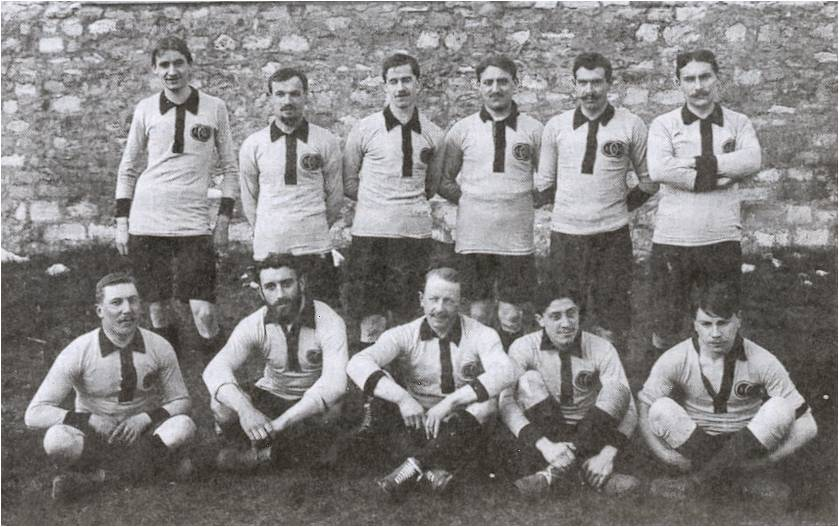

Personal information
- Date of birth: 17 December 1884
- Place of birth: Quevauvillers, France
- Date of death: 21 December 1927 (aged 43)
- Height: 1.69 m (5 ft 7 in)
- Position: Forward

Senior career*
Years	Team	Apps	(Gls)
1902–1903	Olympique Lillois		
1903–1905	Amiens SC		
1905–1908	Chemnitz SC Britannia		
1908–1910	Amiens SC		

International career
1908	France B	1	(0)
- * Club domestic league appearances and goals

Henri Holgard (17 December 1884 – 21 August 1927) was a French footballer. He competed in the men's tournament at the 1908 Summer Olympics.

== Biography ==
Henri Holgard was born on 17 December 1884 in Quevauvillers. He began his career at Olympique Lillois in 1902, aged 18, and he played there until 1903.

He received his first international call-up in May for a friendly against the Netherlands, but he failed to leave the bench. He was playing football at Amiens SC when he was selected by France to participate in the football tournament of the 1908 Summer Olympics in London. France sent two teams to the Olympics, and Holgard was deemed to play for the B team, starting in the first-round match against Denmark, which ended in a 0–9 loss.

Second Lieutenant Holgard distinguished himself during the First World War and received the Croix de guerre with Citation à l'ordre of the regiment.
