= Ernest Tossier =

French footballer

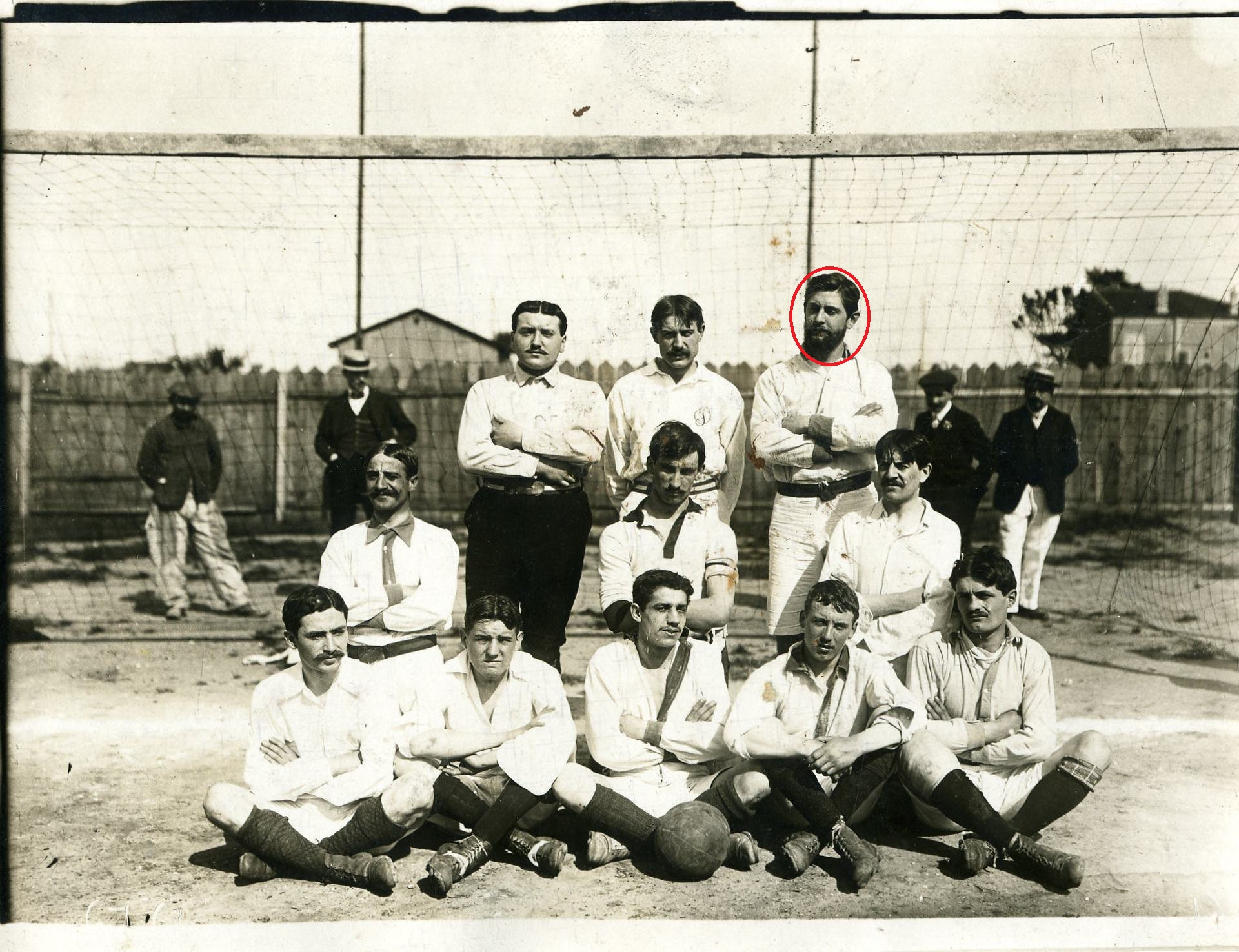
- Tossier (red circle) on 15 May 1910

Personal information
- Full name: Ernest Tossier
- Date of birth: 20 June 1888
- Place of birth: Vitry-sur-Seine, France
- Date of death: 19 December 1948 (aged 60)
- Place of death: Saint-Erme-Outre-et-Ramecourt, France
- Height: 1.80 m (5 ft 11 in)
- Position: Defender

Senior career*
Years	Team	Apps	(Gls)
1908–1913	Patronage Olier		

International career
1909	France	1	(0)
- * Club domestic league appearances and goals

Ernest Tossier (20 June 1888 – 19 December 1948) was a French footballer who played as a defender for Patronage Olier and the French national team between 1908 and 1913.

== Playing career ==
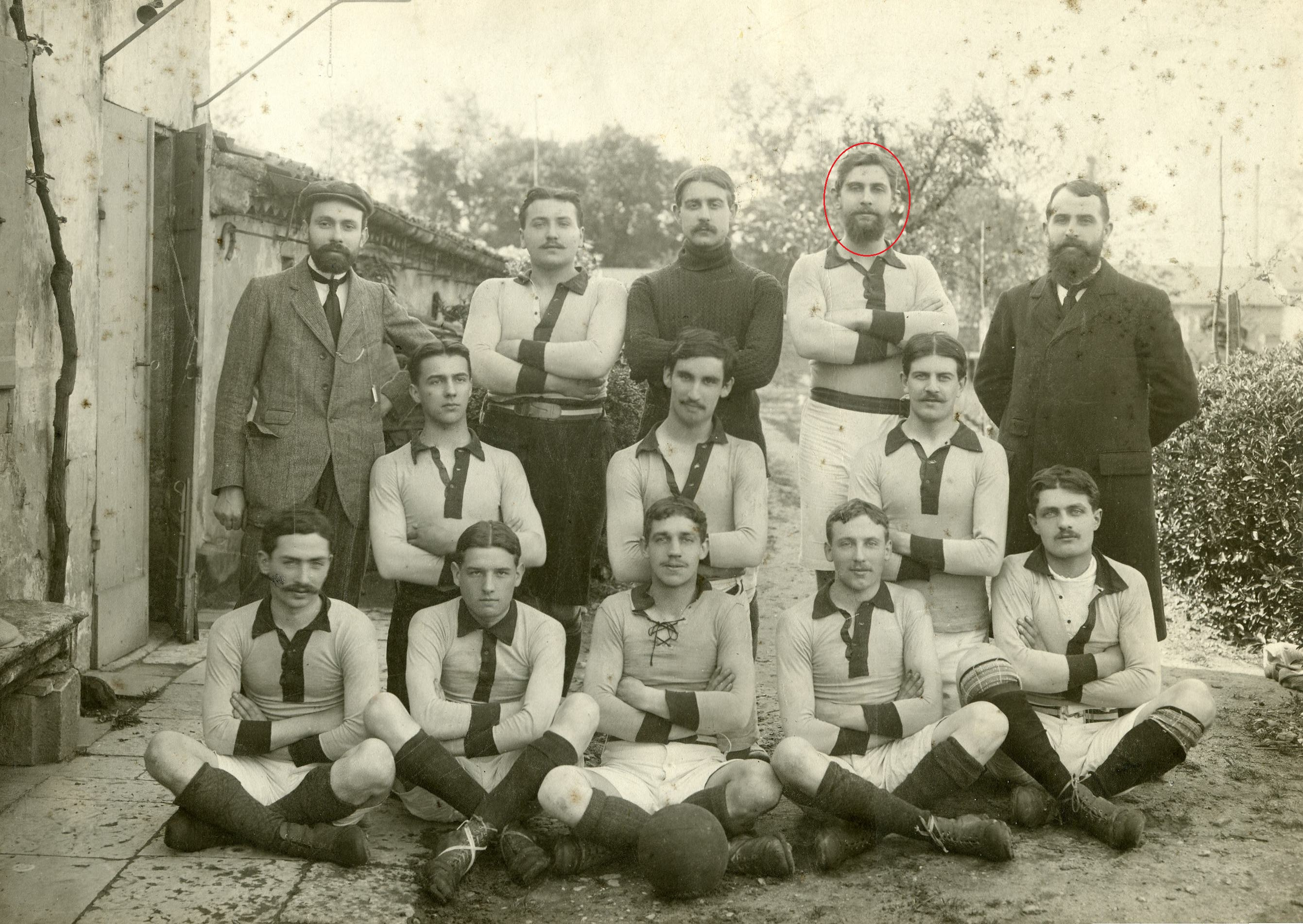
Tossier (red circle) with the Patronage Olier team around 1908.

Ernest Tossier was born in Vitry-sur-Seine on 20 June 1888, and he played his entire football career in the patronage clubs, most notably at the Patronage Olier between 1908 and 1910, one of the many Catholic clubs affiliated with the FGSPF. Tossier was 1.80 meters tall and had broad shoulders, which not only allowed him to succeed in the likes of rugby union and discus throw, which he threw for 34 meters, but also to succeed as a defender in football. He "excelled in the art of stopping a dribbling or intercepting a pass" by imposing himself in duels, probably an influence from rugby, and also had "superb clearance kicks", which means that he powerfully cleared the ball on the volley.

Alongside the Carlier brothers, Henri Guerre, and Eugène Maës, he played a crucial role in helping Olier win the FGSPF Football Championship in 1908. This victory allowed the club to compete in the second edition of the Trophée de France in 1908, an inter-federation national competition organized by the CFI, in which he started in the final as a halfback, helping his side to a 3–0 win over SM de Puteaux, the Parisian champion of the FCAF.

At the time, there were no regulations requiring clubs to release their players to the French national team, unlike the regulations in force at FIFA today. As a result, the Patronage Olier refused to make its players available for France because the club's leaders favored their interests, such as the Trophée de France. However, in October 1908, several PO players, including Tossier and Maës, were selected by the USFSA for the upcoming football tournament of the 1908 Olympic Games, but only as members of the would-be France C squad that was originally listed to compete; none of them traveled to London because the USFSA decided to send only two instead of three teams. A few months later, either Charles Simon, who chaired the CFI, or René Chevalier, who was in charge of the selection of the national team, were able to convince the reluctant PO leaders to give up their defensive pair of fullbacks, Tossier and Guerre, for a friendly match against Uccle in Uccle on 9 May. Along with goalkeeper Louis Tessier, they formed a decent defensive partnership that held up very well, until 10 minutes from the end, during which they conceded four goals due to the fatigue of certain players; France lost 2–5 loss. Tossier and Guerre remain the only players of Patronage Olier to have represented the French national team, probably because the PO leaders did not want to make any other exception.

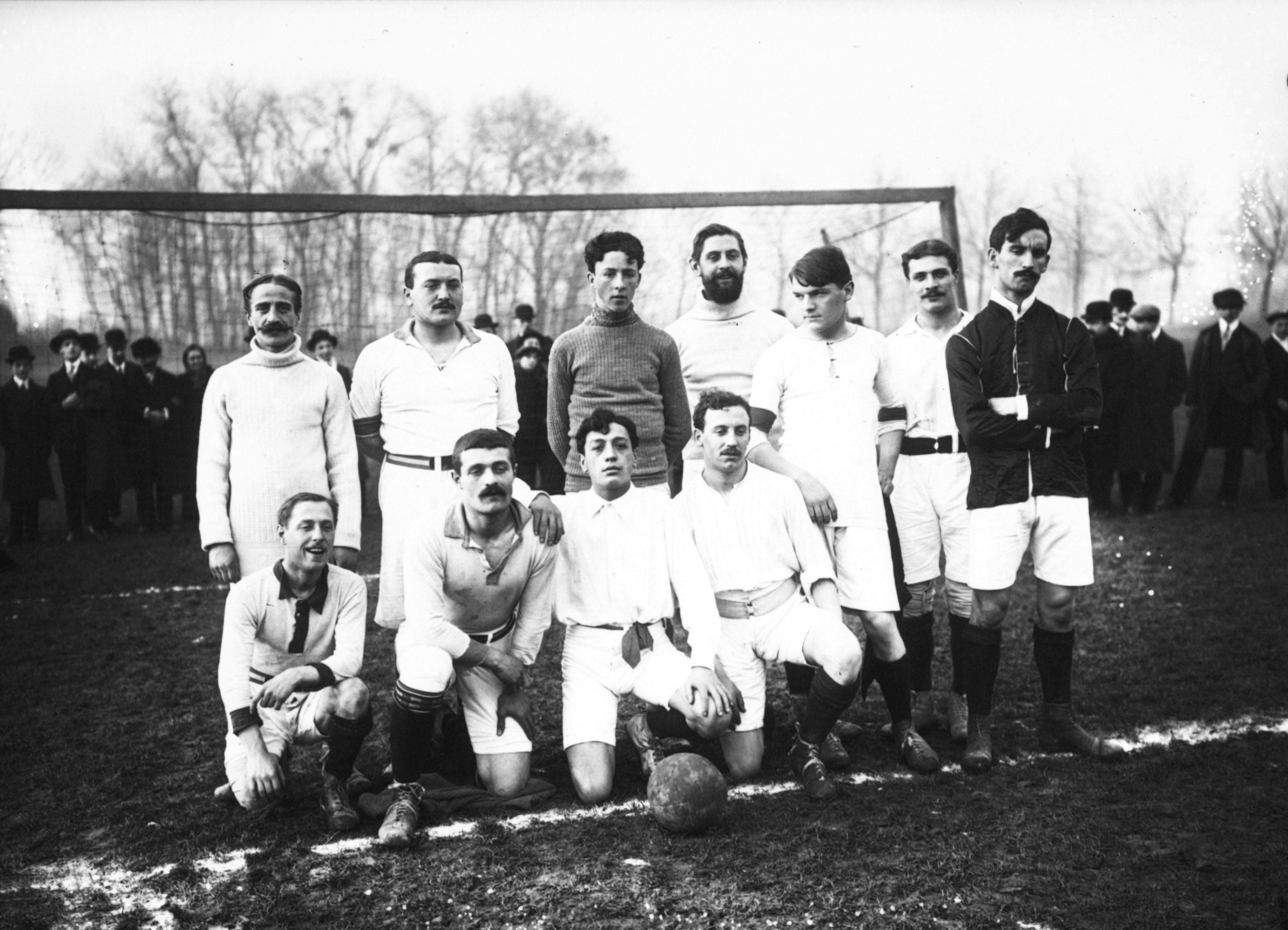
Tossier (standing, bearded) with the Patronage Olier team on 8 December 1912.

On 29 May 1910, Tossier started in the final of the Trophée de France on 29 May, helping his side keep a clean sheet in a 2–0 win over CA Vitry. While Guerre lost interest in football fairly quickly, Tossier kept playing regularly not only until 1914, but also after the First World War, until at least 1921, being always faithful to his patronage and to the complete amateurism that reigned there.

== Later life and death ==
Ernest Tossier was a designer and watercolorist for the Arthus-Bertrand workshop, which is responsible for embroidering military badges, creating medals, and the preservation and restoration of the Coupe de France trophy.

Tossier died in Saint-Erme-Outre-et-Ramecourt on 19 December 1948, at the age of 60.

== Honours ==
Patronage Olier

- FGSPF Football Championship:
  - Champion (3): 1908, 1910, and 1914
- Trophée de France:
  - Champion (2): 1908 and 1910
