= Ursule Wibaut =

French footballer (born 1887)

Personal information
- Date of birth: 18 June 1887
- Place of birth: Vienna, Austria-Hungary
- Date of death: 17 June 1968 (aged 80)

International career
Years	Team	Apps	(Gls)
- France

Ursule Wibaut (18 June 1887 – 17 June 1968) was a French footballer. He competed in the men's tournament at the 1908 Summer Olympics.
