= Stade Georges-Bayrou =

Football stadium in Sète, France

- Location within France
- Address: Rue du football 34200 Sète, Occitanie, France
- Coordinates: 43.412°N 3.670°E
- Capacity: 4,600
- Surface: Grass

Tenants
- FC Sète 34 (????–1990); Pointe-Courte AC Sète

The Stade Georges-Bayrou is a football stadium located in Sète, France. It was the home of FC Sète 34 before the inauguration of the Stade Louis-Michel in 1990. It was named after Georges Bayrou, former president of FC Sète. However, the ground is still used by the club for training. Amateur club Pointe-Courte AC Sète is now a tenant of the stadium.

== History ==
This stadium was the home of the mythical FC Sète in its heyday, before its demise in the 1960s. In 1920, it replaced the Champ de Manœuvres and Stade des Casernes, the first soccer stadiums in the Languedoc port. In the late 1990s, the Stade Louis-Michel was built just a few yards away, and the city's flagship club decided to leave its historic stadium.

From then on, the town's second club, Pointe-Courte de Sète, played in the Georges-Bayrou stadium.

The 10,000-seat English-style stadium gained fame in French soccer because of its size - large for this type of construction in the 1920s (by comparison, the Colombes stadium, the largest in France at the time, had "only" 40,000 seats) - and because the quality of the soccer played there.

But a few years after the municipal elections of 1983, the new mayor Yves Marchand, who had conquered the town's historic Communist stronghold, wanted to leave his mark on the history of Sétois soccer. Rather than modernize the old Bayrou, he decided to build a new stadium, the Stade Louis-Michel.

The Bayrou stadium was not destroyed, however, and continued to host matches for Sète's second-biggest club, Pointe Courte AC, as well as the FC Sète youth and reserve teams.
