= Ludvig Kornerup =

Swedish football referee (1871–1946)

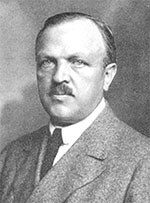
Christian Ludvig Kornerup

Christian Ludvig Kornerup (19 February 1871 – 27 March 1946) was a football referee and a pioneer in Swedish football. He was born in Denmark and lived in Scotland for a while before moving to Sweden in 1899. He then gained Swedish citizenship in 1905. Ludvig Kornerup was the chairman of the Swedish Ballgame Association from 1902 to 1905, and chairman of the Swedish Football Association from 1905 to 1907, and he acted as manager of the Sweden men's national football team in 1908. He also was Vice President of FIFA 1908–1909 and 1914–1920.
