= Georges Prouvost =

French footballer

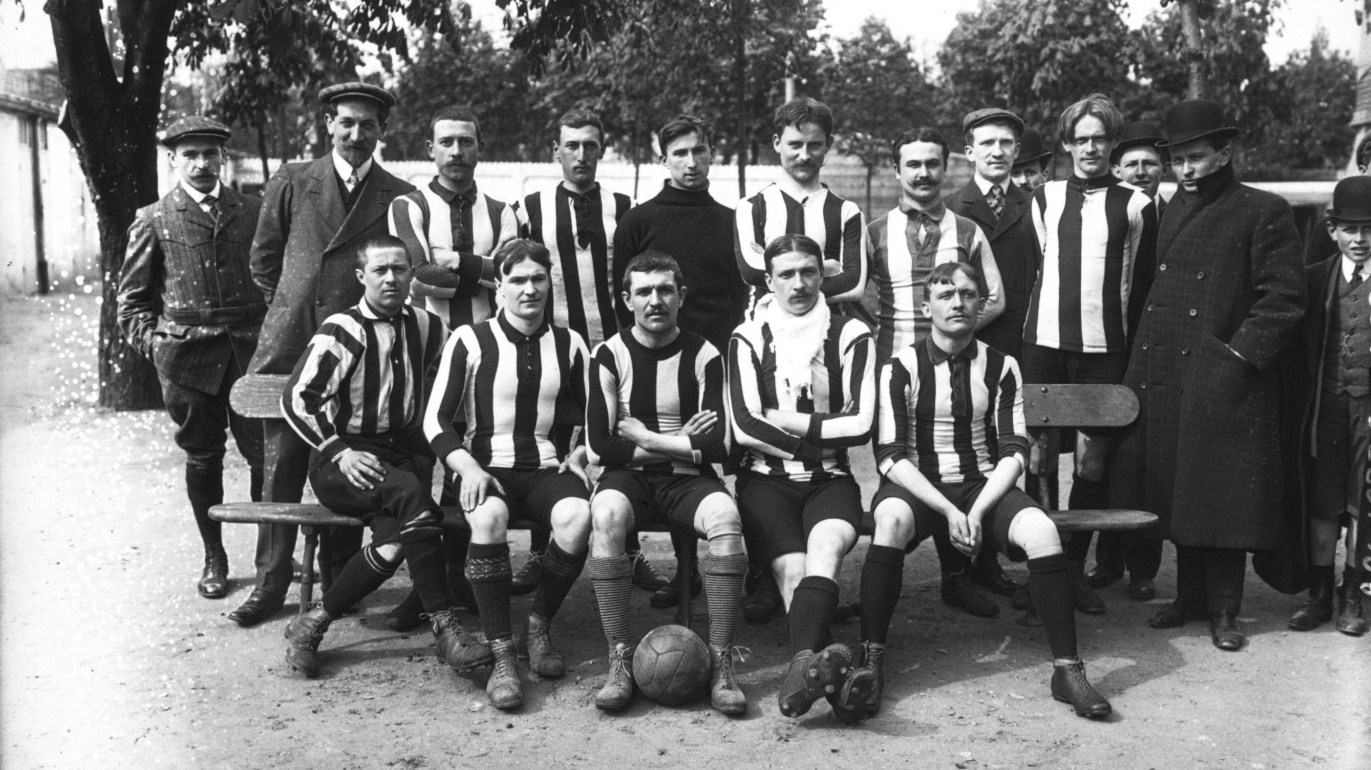
- Prouvost (standing, second from right) in 1910

Personal information
- Place of birth: France
- Position: Midfielder

Senior career*
Years	Team	Apps	(Gls)
1907–1910	US Tourquennoise		
1920	Monégasque FC		

International career
1908	France B	0	(0)
- * Club domestic league appearances and goals

Georges Prouvost was a French footballer who played as a midfielder for US Tourquennoise. He was a member of the French B squad that competed in the football tournament of the 1908 Olympic Games in London, but he did not play in any matches.

== Biography ==
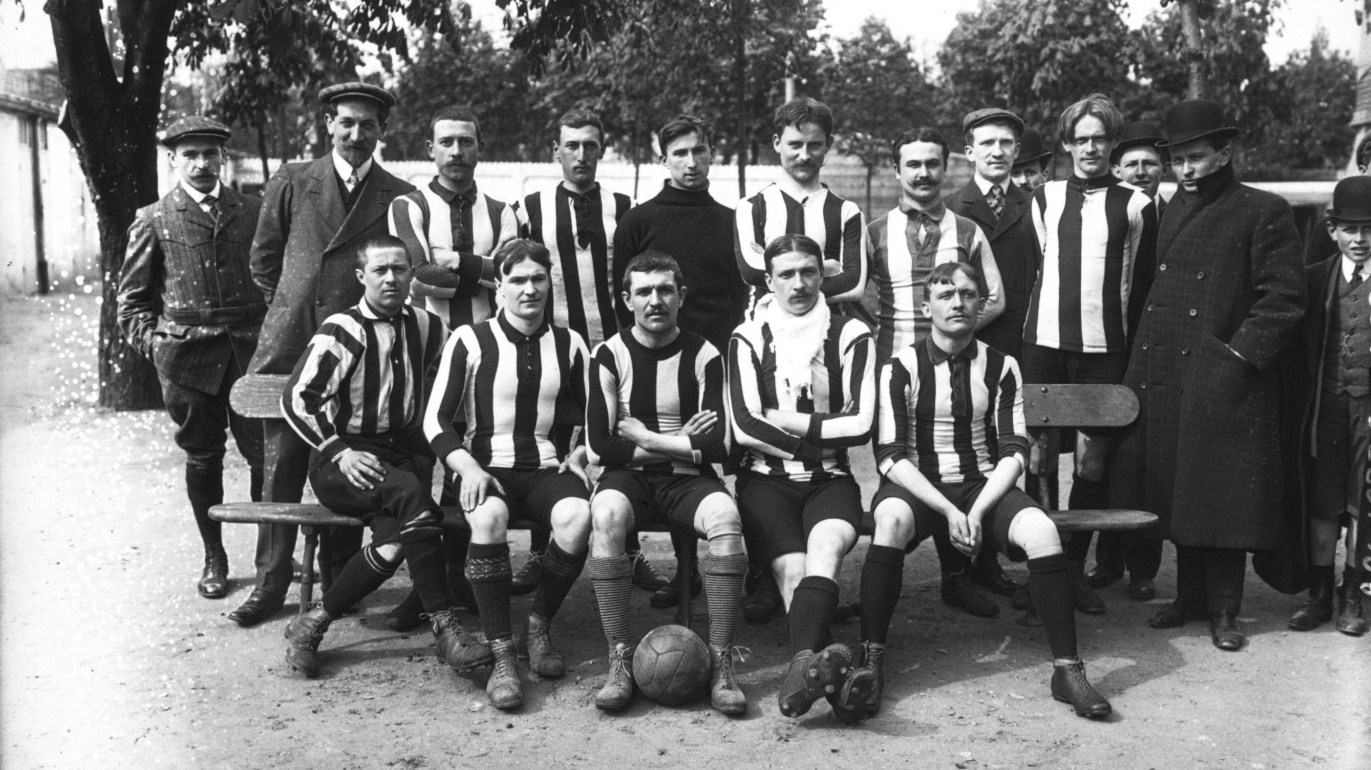
Prouvost (standing, second from right) with the US Tourquennoise team before the final of the 1910 USFSA French championship.

Prouvost was playing football for US Tourquennoise in 1905, when he represented the Northern France team in the very first Paris-Nord match (an annual test match for the French national team), helping his side to a 4–1 win in 1905. He played for the Nord team a further two times, first against Belgium in 1905, and then in the Paris-Nord match of 1906. Three years later, the USFSA selected him for the French B squad that competed in the football tournament of the 1908 Olympic Games in London, but he did not play in any matches as France B was knocked out in the quarter-finals by Denmark (0–9).

On 1 May 1910, Prouvost started in the final of the 1910 French Championship at the Parc des Princes, helping his side to a 7–2 win over SH de Marseille. In the following year, on 29 April 1911, he started in the final of the Challenge International du Nord in Tourcoing, helping his side to a 2–1 win over the English club Cambridge Town.

After the First World War, Prouvost moved to Monaco, becoming the captain of the Monégasque FC as well as the delegated rapporteur of Monaco-Sports.

== Honours ==
US Tourquennoise

- USFSA Football Northern Championship: 1909
- USFSA Football Championship: 1910
- Challenge International du Nord: 1911
