= Paul Mathaux =

French footballer

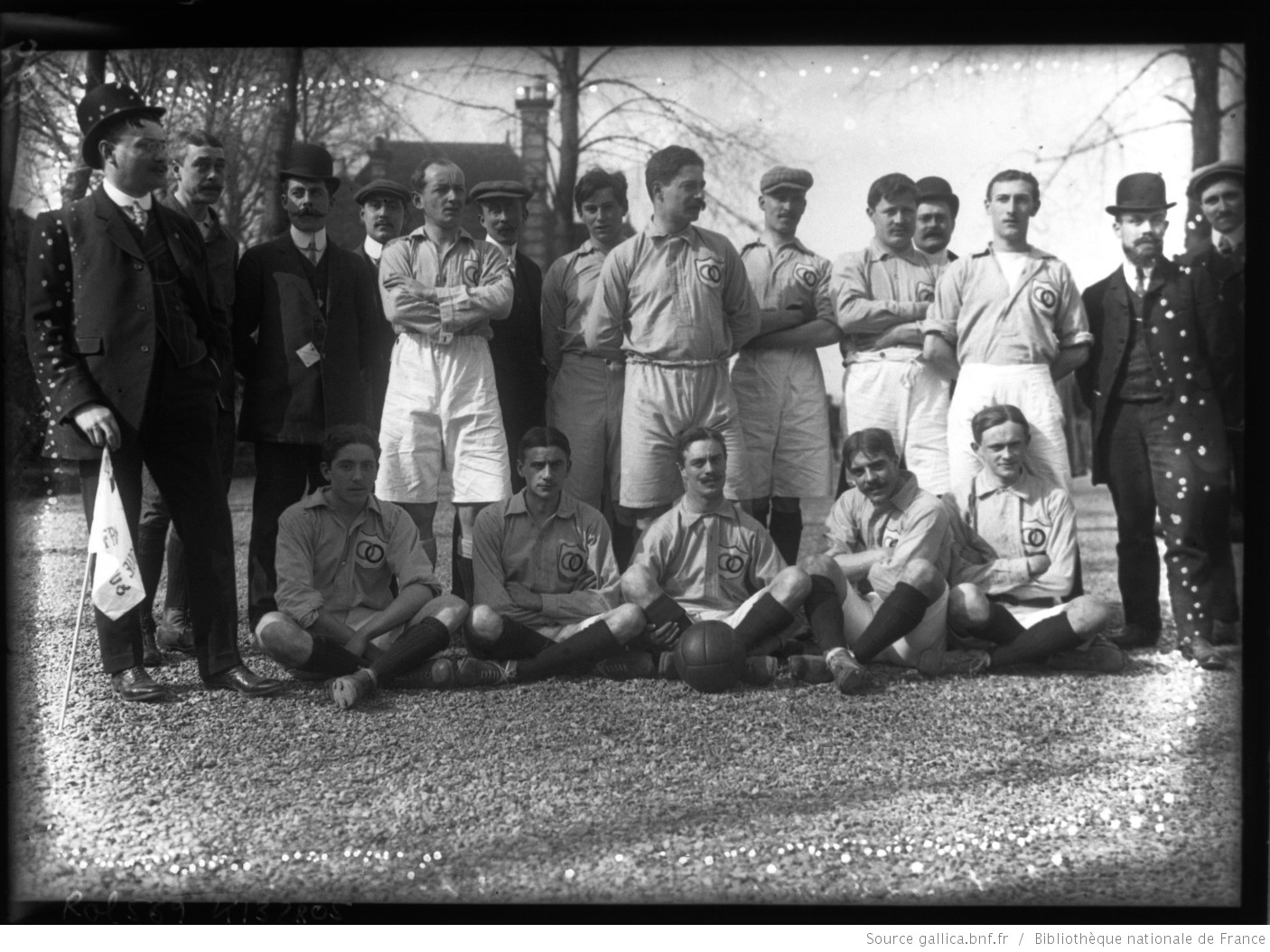
- Mathaux (seated, second from right) with the French team in 1908.

Personal information
- Full name: Paul Édouard Mathaux
- Date of birth: 19 February 1888
- Place of birth: Boulogne-sur-Mer, France
- Date of death: 18 September 1966 (aged 78)
- Place of death: Ivry-sur-Seine, France
- Position: Forward

Senior career*
Years	Team	Apps	(Gls)
1904–1912	US Boulogne		
1912–1924	OSC Boulogne		

International career
1908–1913	Northern France	2	(0)
1908	France	4	(0)
1908	France B	1	(0)
- * Club domestic league appearances and goals

Paul Édouard Mathaux (19 February 1888 – 18 September 1966) was a French footballer who played as a forward for US Boulogne and the French national team between 1904 and 1914. He also competed in the football tournament at the 1908 Summer Olympics in London, doing so as a member of the France B squad.

== Early life ==
Paul-Édouard Mathaux was born in Boulogne-sur-Mer on 19 February 1888, as the son of a grocer with a shop window at 2 rue de Lille, and Mathaux himself would later become a grocer as well, in Boulogne first, but also later in the 14th arrondissement of Paris. Paul was a constant in the family, with the second name was used to distinguish them; for instance, his father was called Paul-Clément, his brother Robert-Paul, and his son would be called Paul-Jean.

== Playing career ==
Just like his older brother Robert-Paul, he began his football career at US Boulogne, establishing himself as a regular in 1905. In 1906, he was described as follows: "Has only been playing in the first team for a year; makes progress every day, gets on very well with his winger, has an excellent shot, but lacks a little speed". A left-sided centre, Mathaux is more of a passer than a scorer, therefore the antithesis of the "dribbling game" player so widespread at the time.

The US Boulogne's football pitch, called the Moulin Wibert, was perched on top of a cliff, thus being both steep and exposed to all the winds. At the time, Northern France had two separate regional championships: the land and the maritime, whose winners were opposed in a final, and Boulogne therefore usually played against Dunkerque FC and its main rivals RC Calais in the maritime championship, and then only met RC Roubaix or US Tourcoing in the regional final, which they lost regularly. Basically, Boulogne, Calais, and Dunkirk played in a closed environment, so international football was far from their concerns, but his performance for the Northerners in the Paris-Nord meeting of 1908, which served as annual test matches for the French national team, convinced France's head coach, the Northerner André Billy, to give him a chance in a friendly match against Switzerland in Geneva on 8 March 1908, helping his side to a 2–1 win. His next four appearances, however, were dreadful, including a 0–12 loss to England amateurs and a humiliation at the 1908 Olympic Games against Denmark (0–9). Mathaux, who never played in the French championship because his club was never champion of the North, earned five consecutive caps for France, losing four and not making a single goal nor assist.

In 1912, he and his older brother left US Boulogne to join OSC Boulogne, where Paul-Édouard distinguished himself until 1924, while continuing to run the family grocery store with his mother. In December 1913, he played in his second Paris-Nord match, which ended in an 8–3 defeat.

== Later life and death ==
Mathaux went through the First World War without injury, even though he served for nearly five years, from 3 August 1914 to 22 July 1919. After that, he returned to Boulogne to help his widowed mother in the family grocery store, while taking out an FFF license at the OSC Boulogne. In the early 1920s, shortly after his marriage (he was widowed twice in ten years), he came to settle in Paris where he opened his own grocery store.

Mathaux died in Ivry-sur-Seine on 19 September 1966, at the age of 78.
