= Quevauvillers =

- Commune
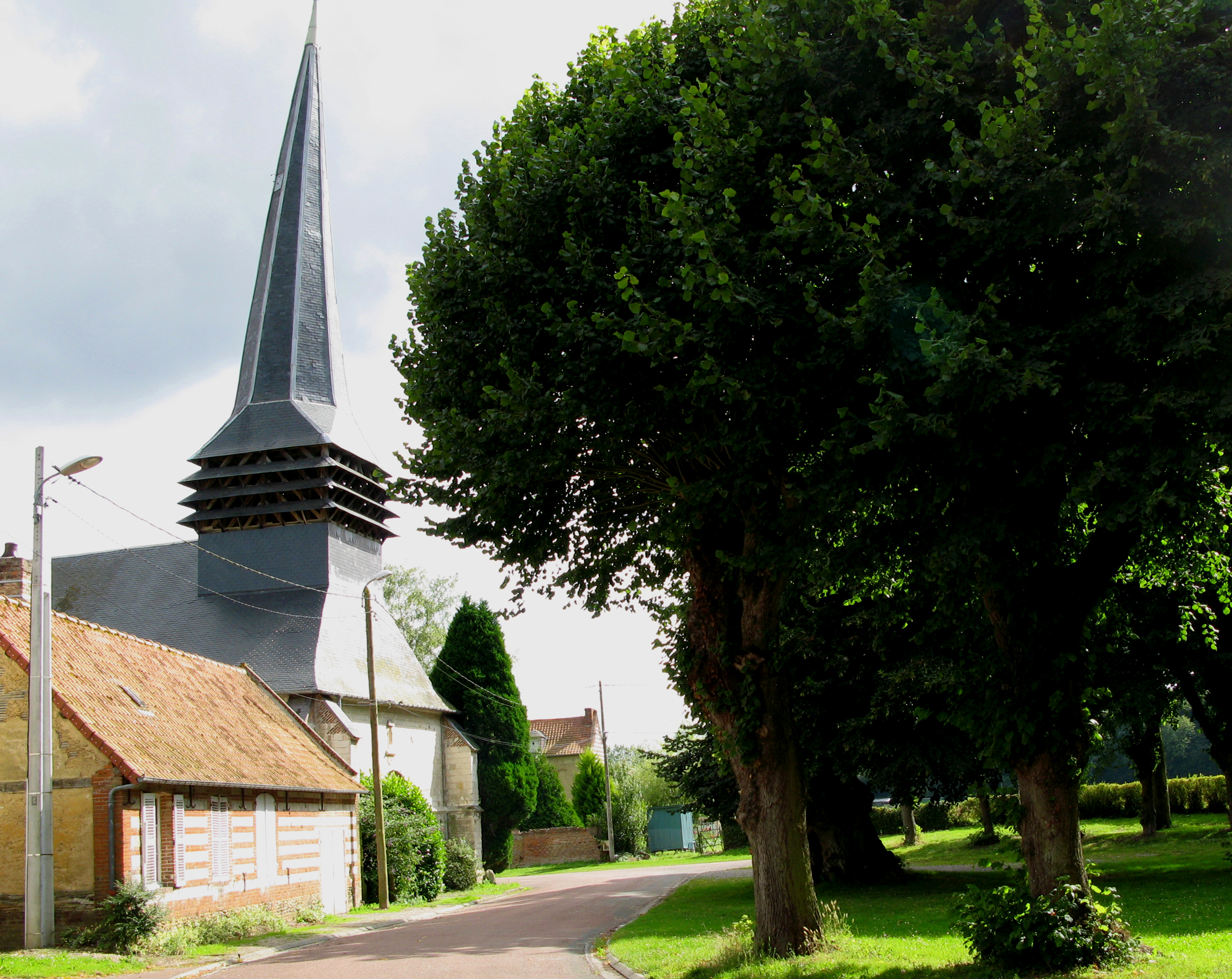
- The church in Quevauvillers
- Location of Quevauvillers
- Location within France Location within Hauts-de-France
- Coordinates: 49°49′27″N 2°05′05″E
- Country: France
- Region: Hauts-de-France
- Department: Somme
- Arrondissement: Amiens
- Canton: Ailly-sur-Somme
- Intercommunality: CC Somme Sud-Ouest

Government
  - Mayor (2020–2026): Dominique Dussuelle
- Area^{1}: 8.82 km^{2} (3.41 sq mi)
- Elevation: 139 m (456 ft)
- Highest elevation: 157 m (515 ft)
- Lowest elevation: 95 m (312 ft)
- Population (2023): 1,102
  - Density: 125/km^{2} (324/sq mi)
- Time zone: UTC+01:00 (CET)
  - Summer (DST): UTC+02:00 (CEST)
- INSEE/Postal code: 80656 /80710
- ^{1} French Land Register data, which excludes lakes, ponds, glaciers > 1 km^{2} (0.386 sq mi or 247 acres) and river estuaries.

Quevauvillers (French pronunciation: [kəvovile]) is a commune in the Somme department in Hauts-de-France in northern France.

== Geography ==
Quevauvillers is situated on the N29 road, some 15 miles (24 km) southwest of Amiens.

== Population ==
Historical population
Year	Pop.	±% p.a.
1968	715	—
1975	783	+1.31%
1982	921	+2.35%
1990	1,046	+1.60%
1999	1,054	+0.08%
2007	1,030	−0.29%
2012	1,105	+1.42%
2017	1,102	−0.05%
2023	1,102	+0.00%
Source: INSEE

== History ==
The village of Quevauvillers first appears in Roman times as Equitum villa (residence of the riders) and would haver been a staging post on the Roman road from Amiens to Rouen.
During the wars with the Normans near the end of the first millennium, the village was completely destroyed.

== Personalities ==
Jean-Pierre Pernaut, television reporter, spent his childhood here.

== See also ==
- Communes of the Somme department
