= Edgard Poelmans =

Belgian footballer

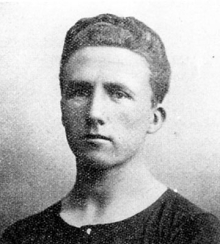

Personal information
- Date of birth: 13 July 1883
- Place of birth: Mechelen, Belgium
- Date of death: 14 December 1932 (aged 49)

International career
Years	Team	Apps	(Gls)
1904–1911	Belgium	16	(1)

Edgard Poelmans (13 July 1883 – 14 December 1932) was a Belgian footballer. He played in 16 matches for the Belgium national football team from 1904 to 1911.
