= Louis Schubart =

French footballer (1885-1954)

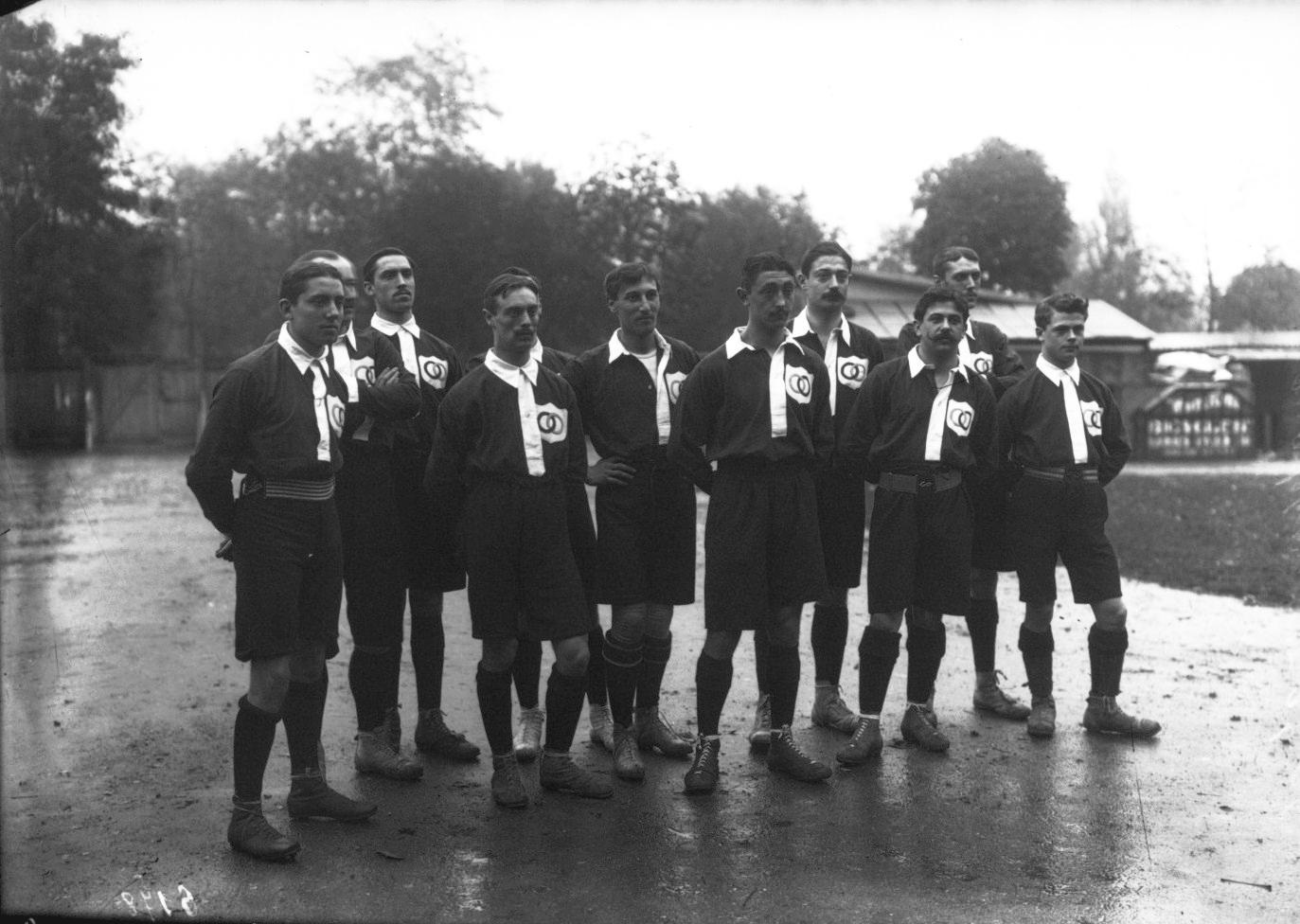
- The French team which faces amateur England in 1906. Schubart is the penultimate player from the left.

Personal information
- Date of birth: 9 April 1885
- Place of birth: Lille, France
- Date of death: 23 November 1954 (aged 69)
- Place of death: Beaugency, France

International career
| Years | Team | Apps | (Gls) |
- France

Louis Schubart (9 April 1885 – 23 November 1954) was a French footballer. He competed in the men's tournament at the 1908 Summer Olympics.
