= Albert Schaff =

French footballer (1885-1968)

Personal information
- Date of birth: 8 April 1885
- Place of birth: Paris, France
- Date of death: 21 April 1968 (aged 83)

International career
Years	Team	Apps	(Gls)
- France

Albert Schaff (8 April 1885 – 21 April 1968) was a French footballer. He played in one match for the France national football team in 1914.
