= Julien du Rhéart =

French footballer (1885-1963)

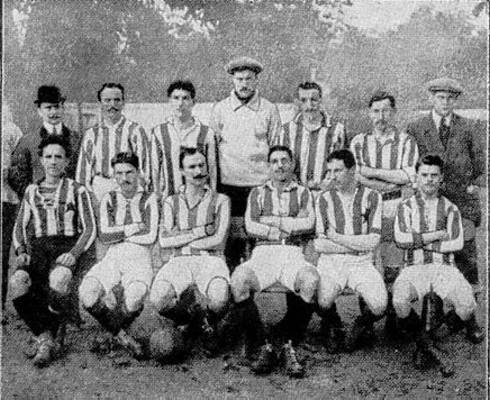

Personal information
- Date of birth: 13 March 1885
- Place of birth: Paris, France
- Date of death: 28 February 1963 (aged 77)
- Position: Midfielder

International career
| Years | Team | Apps | (Gls) |
| 1906–1911 | France | 3 | (0) |

Julien du Rhéart (13 March 1885 – 28 February 1963) was a French footballer. A midfielder, he played in three matches for the France national football team between 1906 and 1911.
