= Georges Bayrou =

French footballer (1883-1953)

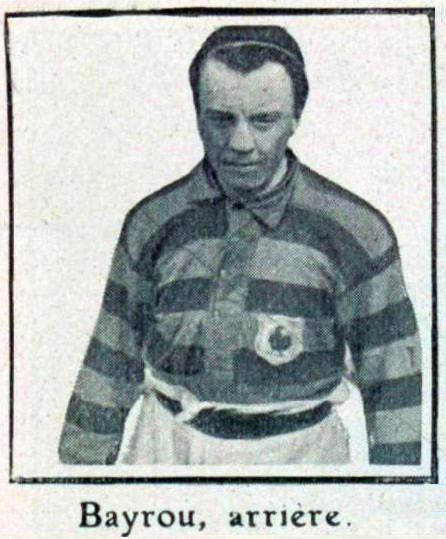
- Georges Bayrou in 1905

Personal information
- Date of birth: 21 December 1883
- Place of birth: Sète, France
- Date of death: 5 December 1953 (aged 69)
- Place of death: Montpellier, France
- Position: Forward

Senior career*
Years	Team	Apps	(Gls)
1904–1908	Gallia Club Paris		

International career
1908	France	1	(0)
- * Club domestic league appearances and goals

Georges Bayrou (21 December 1883 – 5 December 1953) was a French footballer. He competed in the men's tournament at the 1908 Summer Olympics.

== Career ==
Bayrou played for Gallia Club Paris in 1904–1908, where he won the 1905 USFSA Football Championship. On 22 October 1908, he played his first and only match for France in a 17–1 defeat against Denmark during the 1908 Summer Olympics.

In 1908, he became the president of Olympique de Cette, which later became FC Sète, in which they won two Coupe de France in 1930 and 1934, and two Division 1 titles in 1933–34 and 1938–39, during his tenure. The Stade Georges-Bayrou stadium is named after him.
