= Gallia Club Paris =

French football club

Gallia Club, also known as Gallia Club Paris to identify the club's location, was a French amateur football club based in Paris. The club was founded in 1896 and were known as Les coqs (The Roosters). Gallia Club was among the few clubs that participated in France's first-ever football league, Le Championnat de USFSA, joining the league for the 1896–97 season. The club won its only USFSA league title in the 1904–05 season defeating Roubaix 1–0 at the Parc des Princes. Midfielder Georges Bayrou was particularly instrumental in the club's success. Bayrou later went on to become one of the founding fathers of professionalism in French football. Gallia Club also won the Coupe Manier and the Coupe Dewar in 1904 and 1909, respectively. Following the collapse of the USFSA, Gallia Club fell to the Division d'Honneur and never recovered domestically. The club had limited success in the Coupe de France and, after merging with Stade d'Ivry in 1926, Gallia disbanded in 1940 just before the war.
