= United SC (Paris) =

Football club in France

- Full name: United Sports Club
- Short name: United SC
- Founded: 1894; 132 years ago
- Dissolved: 1909
- Ground: Porte Dauphine
Home colours colours

The United Sports Club, better known as United SC, was a football team based in Paris that existed between 1894 and 1909. In 1906, United SC merged with Swiss Football Club to form the US Suisse Paris.

Created by British members of the Standard Athletic Club, it began its activities in the second edition of the French Championship organized by the USFSA, the first football competition in France. Notably, United SC finished runners-up in the 1902 USFSA Paris championship and then won the Coupe Dewar in 1903. The 1903–04 season was the most successful in the club's history, as the club won the Paris Championship, thus qualifying for the French Championship, where they reached the final, which ended in a 2–4 loss to RC Roubaix.

== History ==
=== Genesis of the club (1894–98) ===
United Sports Club was founded by the Wynn family, pioneers of French football, which was made up of father Henri, a goalkeeper, and brothers Edouard and Aubry, outfield players. They founded the short-lived Gordon Football Club in 1891, then participated in the founding of the Standard AC the following year. Henri and Edouard played a crucial role in helping Standard win the first two titles of the USFSA French championship in 1894 and 1895. In September 1894, the Wynns founded their own club, United Sports Club, and even though Henri and Edouard initially remained members of Standard AC, they eventually joined United in the late 1890s, which at the time was mainly made up of English and Swiss immigrants. Initially, United SC only had two French players, the full-backs Conchon and Deleclerc.

The club adopted a half-navy blue, half-sky blue jersey as its colours. It was based on the former Standard AC ground at Porte Dauphine in Paris. United SC's first known match was a 2–1 loss Paris Star in a training match on 26 January 1895.

United Sports Club is one of eight clubs that take part in the second edition of the USFSA French Championship, which was played in knockout format, with United being eliminated in the quarter-finals by Standard AC following a resounding 13–0 loss. The 1896 edition was played in the form of a round-robin tournament, with United finishing eighth out of nine teams, with only two wins and eight defeats. On 6 January 1896, United SC traveled to Brussels to play its first international match against Racing Club de Bruxelles, and even though they dominated, the Belgians won 1–0. On 5 April, United achieved failed to achieve revenge at Place Collanges in Levallois-Perret on the rugby ground of the Racing Club de France, losing 2–0 to RC Bruxelles.

In the 1897 USFSA French Championship, United finished sixth out of nine clubs, narrowly avoiding relegation to the 2nd tier, as the championship was reduced to just six clubs for the 1897–98 season. The club finished the 1898 French Championship in third place, beaten only by Standard AC and Club Français, winners of all Parisian titles until 1901.

=== United Sports Club ===
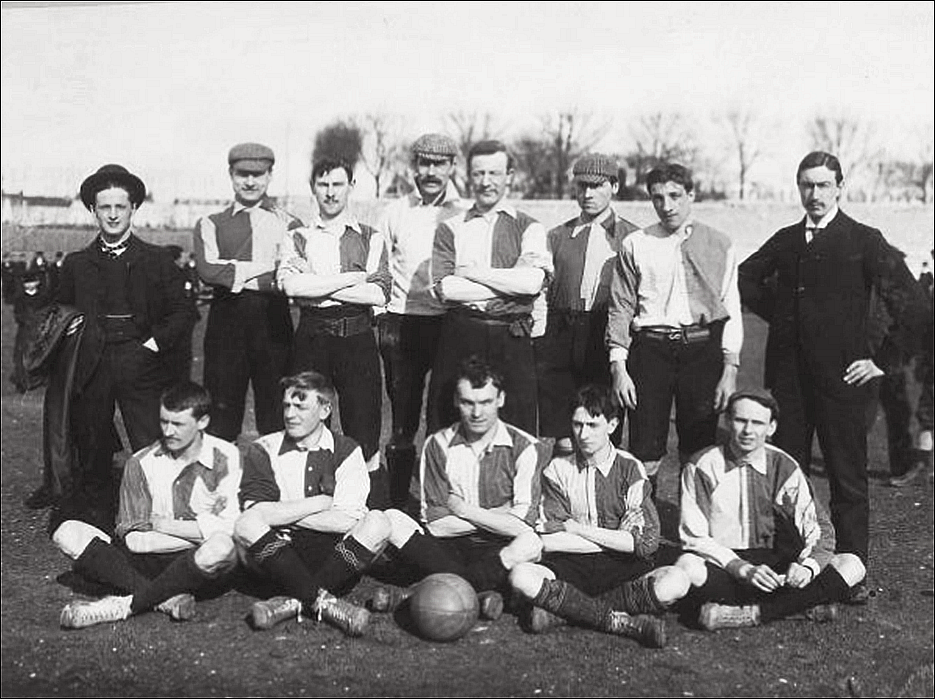
Wynn with the United team before the 1902 Coupe Dewar final on 16 March.

At some point in the late 1890s, the Wynns joined the club they had founded in 1894; for instance, on 23 October 1899, the "goalkeeper Mr. Wynn" was considered one of United's best players in a match against The White Rovers. On 16 March 1902, all three of them started in the final of the 1902 Coupe Dewar, which ended in a 1–0 loss to their former club Standard AC. Five minutes from the end of the match, following a new invasion, the supporters of the two clubs were even close to coming to blows in the middle of the field. The journalist from the French newspaper L'Auto (the future L'Équipe) concluded his summary with a "frankly, two more games organized like that and football is lost in Paris".

United then reached the final of the 1901–02 USFSA Paris Championship against Racing Club de France on 6 April, but the team was missing three of its forwards, all of whom were ill or away from Paris for professional reasons, which forced his father Henri, who was also responsible for setting up the tactics and composing the teams, to modify the forward line and select two debutants: Forsyth, a player of Stade Français, and his third son, Aubert, then a player of the third team; despite starting with four members of the Wynn family, United still lost 2–0. In the following year, on 15 March, Edouard and Aubry started on defense in the final of the 1903 Coupe Dewar against Club Français, helping their side to a 4–3 win after extra-time; this victory was considered "the most interesting match of this season which is drawing to a close".

In 1904, United won their first-ever USFSA Paris Championship, which they claimed on the last matchday with a 5–1 victory over RC France, the two-time defending champion. The following day, L'Auto highlighted its success, noting that "for ten years, United SC has played the role of sidekick in all competitions, showing itself to be the equal of the best, appearing in many finals, being eliminated at the last moment", but "this year, finally, its team has achieved success and won the much-coveted title of champion of Paris". This victory qualified the club for the 1904 USFSA national championship, where they lost in the final 4–2 to RC Roubaix on 17 April; the local press stated that "the Wynn trio was outstanding and was applauded many times in the Roubaix camp". Two weeks later, on 1 May 1904, United SC, the champions of Paris, in a match against the champions of the FGSPF, Étoile des Deux Lacs, claiming a 5–1 victory.

=== Reputation as a violent team ===
Beyond its successes, the United SC was particularly noted for the brutality of its players, and likewise, between 1902 and 1906, United SC was the most sanctioned club by the USFSA, with Aubry Wynn even being sanctioned twice, something which only happened to six players. For instance, during a Paris championship match against RC France on 15 February 1903, Edouard, who "specialises in stopping opposing forwards very hard", missed a charge on Racing's winger, fell, and was "knocked over" by their half-back Guéroult, so he wants to come to blows with him, but his father and captain, Henri, who was not playing in the match, entered the field to punch Guéroult, thus sparking a general brawl which was only stopped by the intervention of the spectators; the local press specified that Henri's behavior was met with the disapproval by his teammates.

United quickly gained a reputation as a violent team, and the Wynn family was primarily responsible for this violence; for instance, following a match against AS Française, the USFSA Football Commission suspended Aubry for eight days for brutality and Edouard for three months for insulting the commission. A press campaign emerged, orchestrated by the French newspaper L'Auto and L'Écho des sports, aimed at presenting United SC as a club to be avoided, with the former stating that "it is always with apprehension that one aligns oneself against United", while the latter stated that "United's leaders recruit each year all that England, German, Switzerland, and other countries have best to offer in terms of brutality". This last comment also illustrates the ambient of xenophobia around a club, which, originally reserved for British nationals, gradually extended its recruitment to German-speaking communities from the mid-1900s. The division was such that during the 1905–06 season, the clubs of the first division of the Paris championship went so far as to consider signing a petition to request the exclusion of United SC from the USFSA championships, but the idea did not come to fruition.

At the same time, the results also became less and less glorious, so much so that they decided to use their connection with the Swiss community of Paris to merge with the Suisse FC in 1906, which went on to become US Suisse Paris in 1910.

The club finished the 1908–09 season in ninth place out of ten clubs, with only two wins, and had to play a promotion/relegation play-off with the top three clubs in the second division. The club struggled against the latter, being beaten 3–0 by Stade Français, drawing 1–1 against Red Star, and only beating FEC Levallois by default. These insufficient results sent United SSC to the second division, where it enventually disappeared.

=== Season by season review ===
The following table shows the season-by-season results of United Sports Club.

United SC season-by-season review
Season	Championship	Division	Classification	Pts	P	W	D	L	Bp	Bc	Diff	Coupe Dewar
1894–95	USFSA Championship	–	Quarters	–	1	0	0	1	0	13	-13	
1895–96	USFSA Championship	–	8 / 9	4	8	2	0	6	12	20	-8	
1896–97	1st series (France)	1	6 / 9	7	8	3	1	4	11	18	-7	
1897–98	1st series (France)	1	3 / 6	11	10	5	1	4	10	22	-12	
1898–99	1st series (Paris)	1	? / ?									?
1899–1900	1st series (Paris)	1	3 / 8	18	14	8	2	4	31	24	+7	Final
1900–01	1st series (Paris)	1	? / 8									Semifinal
1901–02	1st series (Paris)	1	? / 7									Final
1902–03	1st series (Paris)	1	6 / 8									Victory
1903–04	1st series, group A (Paris)	1	1 / 6									Not participated
1903–04	1st series, final group (Paris)	–	1 / 4	5	3	2	1	0	14	3	+11	Not participated
1903–04	French Championship	–	Final	–	3	2	0	1	14	4	+10	Not participated
1904–05	1st series (Paris)	1	? / 12									Not participated
1904–05	1st series (Paris), final group (Paris)	–	? / 4									Not participated
1905–06	1st series (Paris)	1	? / 12									Not participated
1906–07	1st series (Paris)	1	? / 10									Not participated
1907–08	1st series (Paris)	1	? / 10									first round
1908–09	1st series (Paris)	1	? / 10									Not participated

== Noyable players ==
Among the players of the United SC, those who come up most often in the sources are those of the Wynn family. Three members played regularly in the early 1900s: father Henri, goalkeeper, and brothers Edouard and Aubry, who formed the back pair. A certain Aubert Wynn, a player of the third team during the 1901–02 season, was also called to play in the final of that season's Paris championship, during which the club had to face the forfeits of three players of its forward line. There was also a L. Wynn present in the team during the 1905–1906 season. Henri Wynn, the oldest player, was also responsible for composing the teams and setting up the tactics.

The club's good results between the 1901-1902 and 1903-1904 seasons were achieved by a team built around goalkeeper Henri Wynn, fullbacks Edouard Wynn and Aubry Wynn, halfbacks Mainwaring and Alfred Gindrat, and forwards Havercroft, Probert, Henry Bone and Marsh. Two of its players wore the jersey of the French national team: Eugène Nicolaï and Alfred Gindrat, with the former being selected while playing for United.

United SC's Line-ups

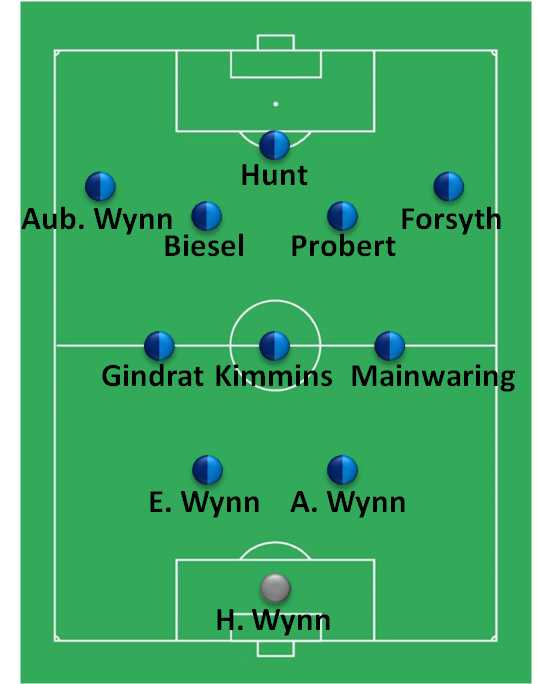
1902 Paris Championship Final

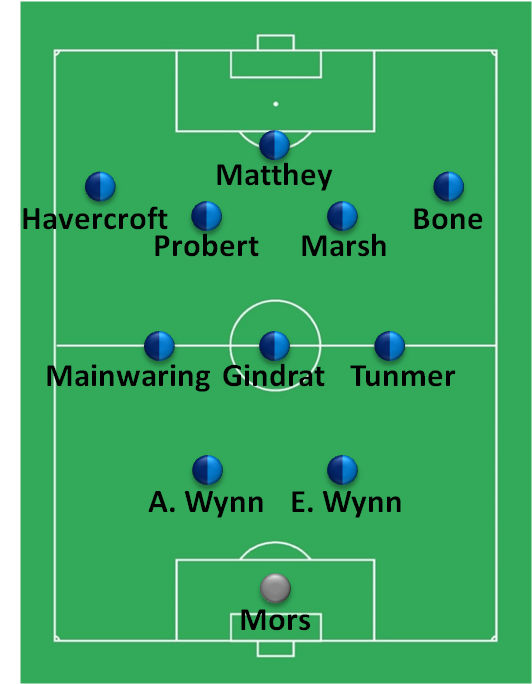
1903 Coupe Dewar Final

== Honours ==
- USFSA Paris Championship:
  - Runner-up (1): 1903
  - Champion (1): 1904
- USFSA Football Championship:
  - Runner-up (1): 1904
- Coupe Dewar:
  - Runner-up (1): 1902
  - Champion (1): 1903

== Bibliography ==
- Duhamel, Georges (1959). Le football français: ses débuts [French football: its beginnings] (in French). Paris: Imprimerie de la Charente. p. 80.
- Sorez, Julien (2013). Le football dans Paris et ses banlieues: Un sport devenu spectacle [Football in Paris and its suburbs: A sport that has become a spectacle] (in French). Paris: Presses universitaires de Rennes. p. 410. ISBN 978-2-7535264-3-3.
