= Aubry Wynn =

English footballer

Personal information
- Place of birth: Roubaix, France
- Position: Defender

Senior career*
| Years | Team | Apps | (Gls) |
| 1896–? | Standard AC | | |
| ?–1905 | United SC | | |
- * Club domestic league appearances and goals

Aubry Wynn was an English football pioneer who, together with his older brothers Henri and Edouard, co-founded the United SC in September 1894.

== Playing career ==
Together with the Woods (Jack and Sid) and the Tunmers (Neville and Alfred), the Wynns was one of the most important families in the amateur beginnings of French football, which included the eldest brother Henri, a goalkeeper, Aubry and Edouard, who formed the pair of backs, and Aubert, a forward. However, little is known about their lives; their father was possibly from Wales before moving to Paris, presumably for work reasons, where all of his sons were born. In September 1894, the Wynns founded their own club, United Sports Club, but they initially remained members of Standard AC. In October 1896, he started as a defender for the second team of Standard AC in a match against the second team of Club Français. On 6 May 1900, he attended the final of the 1900 USFSA Football Championship between Le Havre and Club Français, which ended in a 1–0 win to the former.

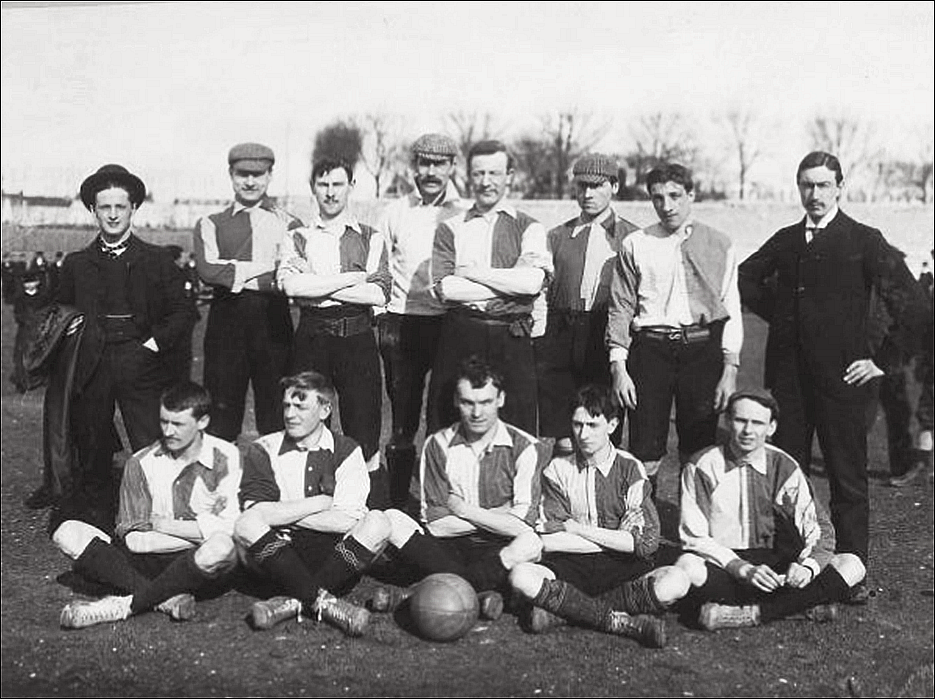
Wynn with the United SC team before the 1902 Coupe Dewar final on 16 March.

On 16 March 1902, all three of them started in the final of the 1902 Coupe Dewar, which ended in a 1–0 loss to their former club Standard AC. United then reached the final of the 1901–02 USFSA Paris Championship against Racing Club de France on 6 April, but the team was missing three of its forwards, all of whom were ill or away from Paris due to professional reasons, which forced his brother Henri, who was also responsible for setting up the tactics and composing the teams, to modify the forward line and select two debutants, including their youngest brother, Aubert, then a player of the third team; despite starting with four members of the Wynn family, United still lost 2–0. In the following year, on 15 March, Aubry and Edouard started on defense in the final of the 1903 Coupe Dewar against Club Français, helping their side to a 4–3 win after extra-time; this victory was considered "the most interesting match of this season which is drawing to a close".

In 1904, the Wynns played a crucial role in helping United win their first-ever USFSA Paris Championship, which they claimed on the last matchday with a 5–1 victory over RC France, the two-time defending champion. This victory qualified the club for the 1904 USFSA national championship, where they lost in the final 4–2 to RC Roubaix on 17 April; the local press stated that "the Wynn trio was outstanding and was applauded many times in the Roubaix camp". Two weeks later, on 1 May 1904, three Wynns, including Aubry, started for United SC, the champions of Paris, in a match against the champions of the FGSPF, Étoile des Deux Lacs, helping their side to a 5–1 win.

=== Reputation as a violent team ===
Beyond its successes, the United SC was particularly noted for the brutality of its players, and likewise, between 1902 and 1906, United SC was the most sanctioned club by the USFSA, with Aubry even being sanctioned twice, something which only happened to six players. United quickly gained a reputation as a violent team, and the Wynn family was primarily responsible for this violence; for instance, following a match against AS Française, the USFSA Football Commission suspended Aubry for eight days for brutality and Edouard for three months for insulting the commission.

A press campaign emerged, orchestrated by the French newspaper L'Auto and L'Écho des sports, aimed at presenting United SC as a club to be avoided, with the former stating that "it is always with apprehension that one aligns oneself against United", while the latter stated that "United's leaders recruit each year all that England, German, Switzerland, and other countries have best to offer in terms of brutality". This last comment also illustrates the ambient of xenophobia around a club, which, originally reserved for British nationals, gradually extended its recruitment to German-speaking communities from the mid-1900s. The division was such that during the 1905–06 season, the clubs of the first division of the Paris championship went so far as to consider signing a petition to request the exclusion of United SC from the USFSA championships, but the idea did not come to fruition.

== Honours ==
United Sports Club

- USFSA Football Championship:
  - Runner-up (1): 1904
- Coupe Dewar:
  - Runner-up (1): 1902
  - Champion (1): 1903

== Bibliography ==
- Duhamel, Georges (1959). Le football français: ses débuts [French football: its beginnings] (in French). Paris: Imprimerie de la Charente. p. 80.
- Sorez, Julien (2013). Le football dans Paris et ses banlieues: Un sport devenu spectacle [Football in Paris and its suburbs: A sport that has become a spectacle] (in French). Paris: Presses universitaires de Rennes. p. 410. ISBN 978-2-7535264-3-3.
