= Henry Bone (footballer) =

English footballer

Personal information
- Place of birth: England
- Position: Midfielder

Senior career*
Years	Team	Apps	(Gls)
1897–1902	Standard AC		
1902–1905	United Sports Club		
1905–1906	Gallia Club		
- * Club domestic league appearances and goals

Henry Bone was an English football who played as a midfielder for Standard AC at the turn of the 20th century.

== Playing career ==
=== Standard AC ===
On 26 December 1897, Bone started in the very first football match in the history of the Parc des Princes in front of 500 spectators, playing for a team called "English Ramblers", which consisted of the best English footballers in Paris, mainly from Standard AC; Bone scored his side's third goal to seal a 3–1 win over Club Français. A few months later, on 3 April, he started as a defender in the final of the 1898 USFSA Football Championship against Club Français at Courbevoie, which ended in a 3–2 win. In the following year, on 16 April 1899, he again started as a defender in a play-off match against Club Français to decide the winner of the 1898–99 USFSA Paris championship; SAC won 3–2. In the following year, on 21 October 1900, Bone started as a defender in a friendly match against United Sports Club, scoring once in an eventual 3–2 loss.

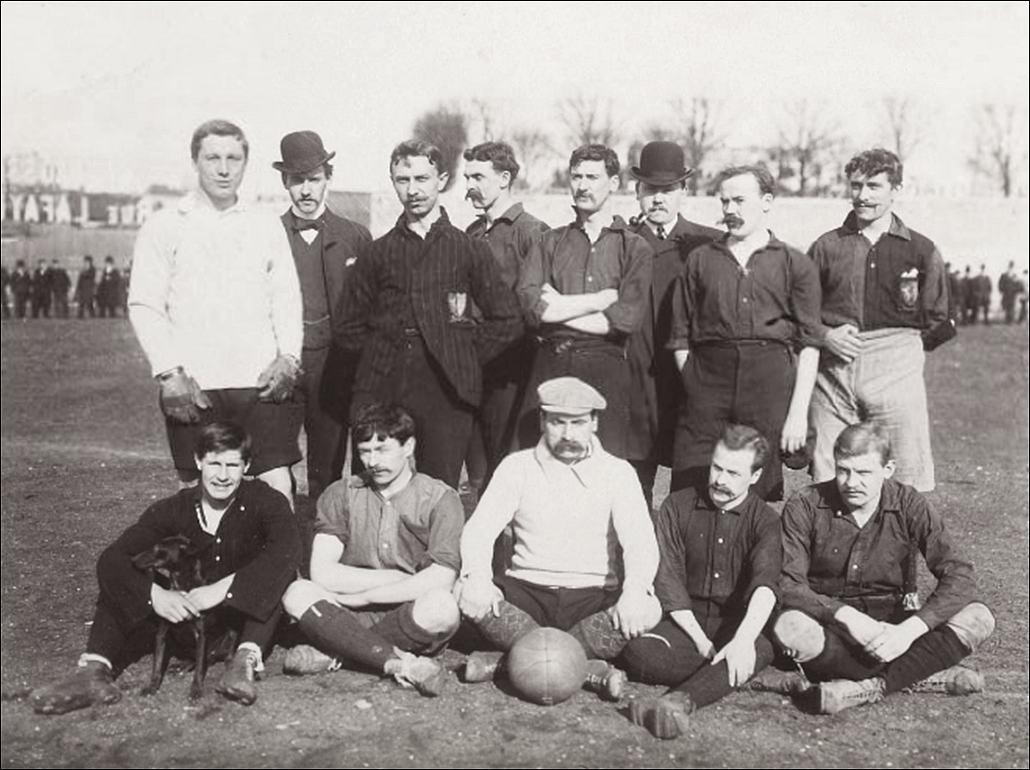
Bone with the Standard team before the 1902 Coupe Dewar final on 16 March.

Together with William Attrill, Alfred Short, and Edward Theobald, he was a member of the Standard team that won the 1901 USFSA Football Championship, starting as a defender in the final against Le Havre on 14 April, which ended in a 1–1 draw, so he was then moved to midfield for the replay, held two weeks later at Stade Langstaff, and this tactical move paid off as Standard won 6–1. In the following year, on 16 March 1902, he started as a forward in the final of the 1902 Coupe Dewar, helping his side to a 1–0 win over his future club United SC; the match had to be temporarily stopped after "a slightly violent charge" from Bone "sent poor Gindrat wandering into the audience".

=== United Sports Club ===
In 1902, Bone left Standard to join United SC, and in his first season at the club, United reached the final of the 1903 Coupe Dewar on 15 March, starting as a forward in an eventual 4–3 win over Club Français after extra-time; this victory was considered "the most interesting match of this season which is drawing to a close".

Together with the Wynn brothers (Henri and Edouard), he played a crucial role in helping United win their first-ever USFSA Paris Championship in 1904, which they claimed on the last matchday thanks to a 5–1 victory over the two-time defending champion RC France; Bone assisted his side's fifth goal with a pass to Havercroft. This victory qualified the club for the 1904 USFSA Football Championship, where they lost in the final 4–2 to RC Roubaix on 17 April. Two weeks later, on 1 May 1904, Bone started for United SC, the champions of Paris, in a match against the champions of the FGSPF, Étoile des Deux Lacs, helping their side to a 5–1 win.

United quickly gained a reputation as a violent team, so the French newspapers L'Auto and L'Écho des sports orchestrated a press campaign aimed at presenting United as a club to be avoided, with Écho stating that "United's leaders recruit each year all that England, German, Switzerland, and other countries have best to offer in terms of brutality", which illustrates the ambient of xenophobia around a club that was originally reserved for British nationals, such as Bone. He remained at United until as late as October 1905.

=== Gallia Club ===
Bone then joined Gallia Club, and in his first season at the club, Gallia reached the final of the 1906 Coupe Dewar, held at the Charentonneau on 6 May, in which he scored the opening goal of the match in an eventual 2–1 loss to RC France. He seems to have retired shortly after.

== Honours ==
Standard AC

- USFSA Football Championship:
  - Champion (1): 1901
- Coupe Dewar:
  - Champion (1): 1902

United SC

- USFSA Paris Championship:
  - Champion (1): 1904
- USFSA Football Championship:
  - Runner-up (1): 1904
- Coupe Dewar:
  - Champion (1): 1903

Gallia Club

- Coupe Dewar:
  - Runner-up (1): 1906

== Bibliography ==
- Sorez, Julien (2013). Le football dans Paris et ses banlieues: Un sport devenu spectacle [Football in Paris and its suburbs: A sport that has become a spectacle] (in French). Paris: Presses universitaires de Rennes. p. 410. ISBN 978-2-7535264-3-3.
