= Georges Crozier =

French footballer (1882–1944)

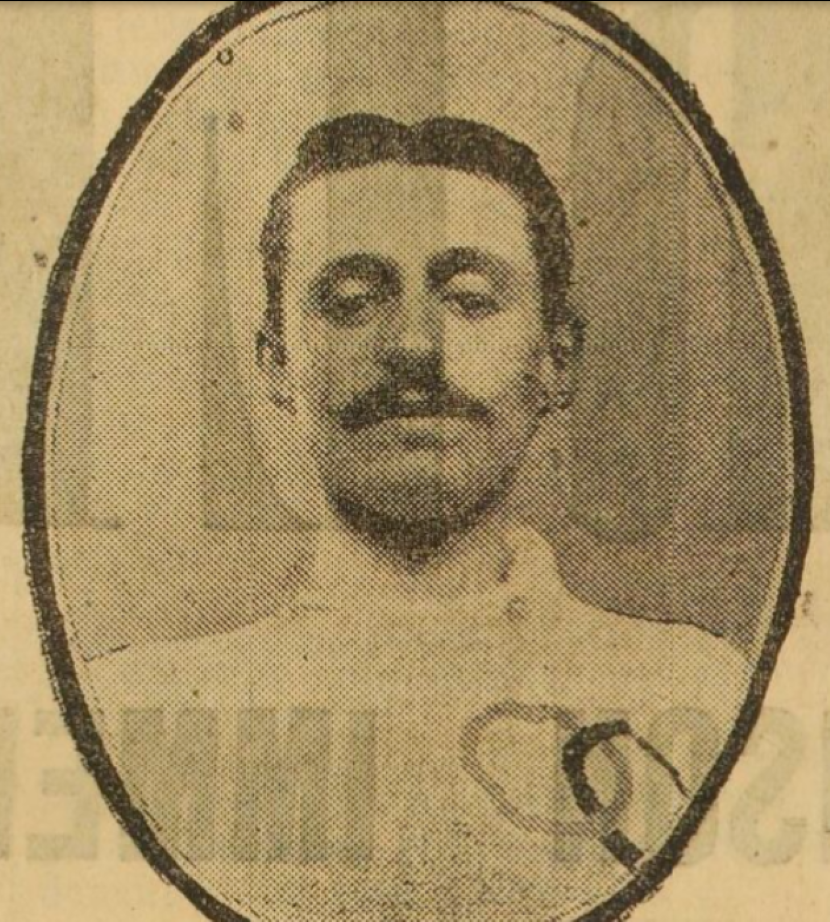
- Georges Crozier in 1906

Personal information
- Full name: Georges Philippe Crozier
- Date of birth: Late 1882
- Place of birth: London, England
- Date of death: 1944 (aged 61–62)
- Place of death: Nice, France
- Position: Goalkeeper

Youth career
- 1896–1897: Lycée Carnot

Senior career*
Years	Team	Apps	(Gls)
1897–1900	Parisienne		
1900–1902	Richmond Town		
1902–1903	West Norwood		
1904–1906	Parisienne		

International career
1905–1906	France	2	(0)
1906	Paris	1	(0)
- * Club domestic league appearances and goals

Georges Philippe Crozier (1882 – February 1944) was a French footballer who played as a goalkeeper for Parisienne and the French national team in the early 20th century. He is sometimes wrongly cited as the first Frenchman to play in England when he joined Fulham of the Southern League in 1904, which never happened.

== Early life ==
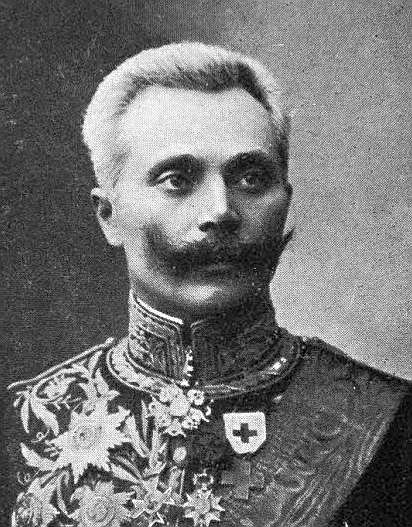
His father Philippe.

Georges Crozier was born in London in late 1882, (Note: He was 18 years old when the 1901 United Kingdom census was held in March, and he was incorporated into the Army in April 1904, with incorporations taking place in the spring for those born at the end of the year.) as the son of diplomat Philippe Crozier (1857–1944), the secretary of the embassy in London between 1881 and 1883, hence his absence from the Parisian civil status lists. He was born out of wedlock and was initially not recognized by his father, being thus recorded under his mother's name until it was rectified. It is known that he carried out his military service in France, but there is no military record in his name, which means that the aferomentioned rectification was not made on his military record.

== Club career ==
On 1 January 1897, the 14-year-old Crozier already was the captain and goalkeeper of AA Lycée Carnot, where he played alongside fellow future international Paul Zeiger. In October 1897, he joined the second team of US Parisienne, but soon reached the first team in 1898.

As the son of a wealthy father, Crozier was sent to England to complete his higher education, doing so in Middlesex, where he began playing football with Richmond Town in 1900, being described in the Richmond Herald as "our French goalkeeper GP Crozier". At the time of the 1901 United Kingdom census in March, he was an 18-year-old clerk living in Hammersmith, which was also the place of residence of his cousin François Gaspard Crozier, who was also a diplomat and minister. In April, he started for the so-called Richmond Old Boys FC in an Easter match against a team made-up of players from Union Sportive and Sporting Club Amateurs de Paris in Calais.

In July 1901, Crozier was working as the correspondent in London for the French newspaper L'Auto (the forerunner of L'Équipe), writing a small article about Henri Deloge's arrival in the English capital. In February 1903, he kept goal for a South London team in a match against the North. Crozier stayed at Richmond for four years, from 1899 until October 1903, when he was transferred to West Norwood, where he was offered the captaincy despite being a foreigner. On 14 November, he started in the 4th qualifying round of the 1903–04 FA Cup against Fulham, which ended in a 0–4 loss. After the match of the following week, however, he returned to Paris with some urgency, possibly because he had to present himself to the revision council, being then incorporated into the Army in April 1904.

Crozier soon rejoined his former team, US Parisienne, but this time his playing time was severely limited not only because he was carrying out his mandatory two-year military service in the barracks of Soissons, but also due to the presence of Maurice Guichard, who was the club's starting goalkeeper during those years. Nonetheless, on 16 April 1905, he started for USP in the final of th 1905 Dewar Cup against Racing de France, replacing the "slightly injured" Guichard and keeping a clean-sheet in a 2–0 victory. During the next few months, he played more regularly, making his last appearance for USP in December 1906, as he then decided to join his father, who had just been appointed ambassador to Vienna, a prestigious position.

== International career ==
Despite playing only one match since his return to France in late 1903 and April 1905, Crozier was called-up by the French national team to replace the still injured Guichard in a friendly match against Belgium in Brussels on 7 May. Apparently, he was selected only because of his reputation, which was based solely on the compliments of "the Fulham directors, who had hired him and would have played him regularly if the regiment had not forced him to return to France"; Crozier, however, never played for Fulham during his time in England, meaning that this statement, published by L'Auto on 2 May, was a mistake from the journalists, likely the result of a confusion over the match he played for West Norwood against Fulham in the FA Cup. This statement later resulted in the notion that he had played for Fulham in the 1904–05 season, which caused many media outlets to wrongly cite him as the first Frenchman to play in England in 1904.

Either way, Crozier was reluctant to travel to Brussels because he was worried about being declared a deserter if he did not return to the barracks in Soissons on time, not only due to the sanctions, but also to avoid a possible scandal, given that he was the son of an ambassador. He only accepted to go after the national coach Robert Guérin assured him that he would be able to take the 6 p.m. train, which Crozier did, thus forcing the French team to play the last 25 minutes of the match with only 10 men, but only because the start of the match was delayed 45 minutes as a result of the referee John Lewis arriving late; France lost 7–0, with three goals being scored after Crozier's departure.

In October 1905, Crozier, who now played more regularly for USP, was selected by the Paris football team for a friendly against a London XI at Fulham, but returning from London to Soissons was even more complicated than from Brussels, so he had to refuse once again. Three months later, in January 1906, he played in the Paris-Nord match. Despite his poor performance in his debut, Crozier was somehow reselected for France's next match, also against the Belgians, in April 1906, which ended in a 5–0 loss. During this match, he became the first goalkeeper to save a penalty for the French national team, taken by Belgian full-back Edgard Poelmans. A few months later, in October 1906, Ernest Weber, the star football journalist of L'Auto, described him as a captain "who combines his in-depth knowledge of the game with the skill and composure that made him the national team's goalkeeper".

== Playing style ==
In late 1905, Crozier authored a long article that occupied three columns in L'Auto, in which he recommended using mainly his hands, given that most goalkeepers at the time played mostly with their feet, and encouraged diving, which was also still very rare, stating "When you have tried it a few times, you are surprised to see how easy the dive is to execute". He was thus a modern goalkeeper, hence why the local press described him as having "a game too special to be compared" in October 1905.

== Later life ==
Crozier most likely stayed in Vienna until 1912, when his father returned to Paris, where he entered the financial circles of the newly established Banque Franco-Japonaise, an initiative from Société Générale. At some point after World War I, presumably in the early 1920s, Crozier, now in his 40s, began traveling to Japan either accompanying his father or on his behalf, and whilst there, he was playing a football match when he sustained an serious injury that paralyzed both his legs for several years, which forced him to be repatriated to undergo rehabilitation in France.

In September 1931, Crozier, who now needed a cane to walk, became president of the OGC Nice football commission, solely because of the prestige of his father, as he had never played for the club and had no previous connection to Nice. He held this position for five years, until 1936, a period in which the club experienced vicissitudes in professionalism. His orbituary stated "his keen sense of football, his sound and fair criticism, had been an authority on the great Nice club".

Crozier was also a literary scholar who translated numerous foreign detective novels.

== Death ==
Crozier died in Nice on either 11 or 12 February 1944, at the age of 61, just a few days after his father, who died on 9 February in Geneva. He was buried on 14 February.
