= Edouard Wynn =

English football pioneer (fl. 1891–1904)

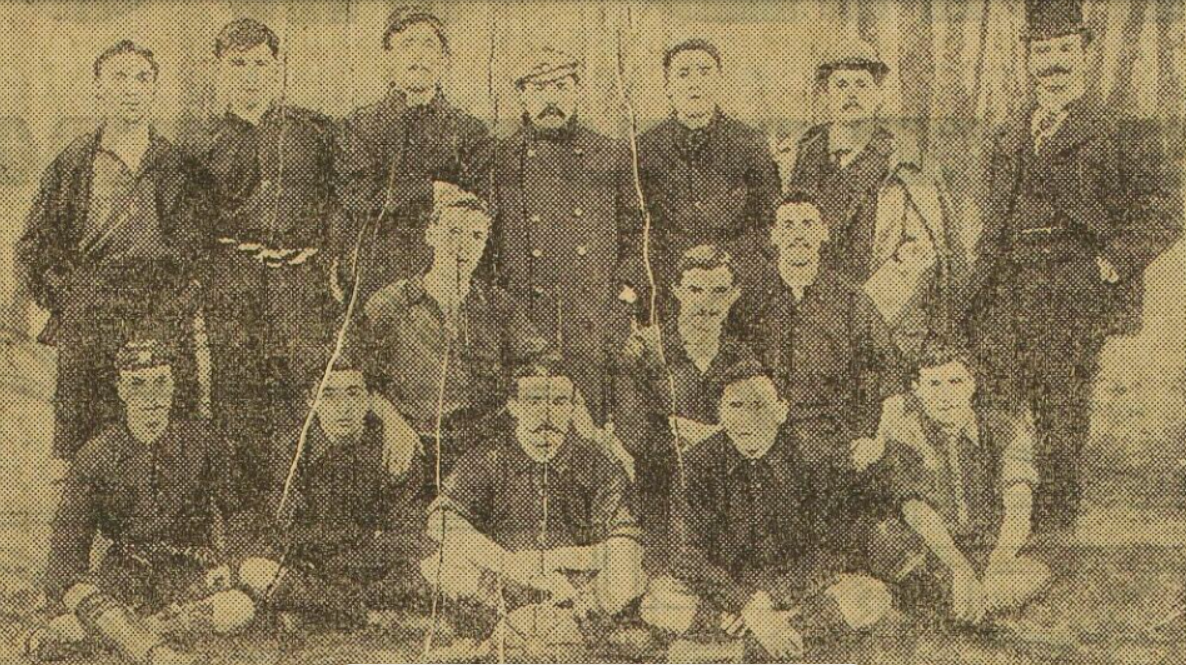
- Wynn (standing, third from right) in 1897

Personal information
- Place of birth: Roubaix, France
- Position: Defender

Senior career*
Years	Team	Apps	(Gls)
1891–1892	Gordon Football Club		
1892–1898	Standard AC		
1898–1904	United Sports Club		
- * Club domestic league appearances and goals

Edouard Wynn was an English football pioneer who, together with his father Henri, co-founded Standard AC in 1892, with whom they won the first two national French Championships in 1894 and 1895. They also co-founded the United SC in September 1894.

== Playing career ==
=== Founding Standard and United ===
Together with the Woods (Jack and Sid) and the Tunmers (Neville and Alfred), the Wynns were one of the most important families in the amateur beginnings of French football, which included the father Henri, a goalkeeper, and his three sons Edouard and Aubry, who formed the pair of backs, and Aubert, a forward. However, little is known about their lives; his father Henri was possibly born "Henry" in Wales before moving to Paris, presumably for work reasons, where all of his sons were born, and even giving a French name to his son Edouard.

In October 1891, the Wynns founded the Gordon Football Club with several of their compatriots, whose name was intended to honour the memory of General Charles Gordon, who had died in 1885. A few months later, in March 1892, Gordon decided to join forces with a fellow English club called Paris AFC, and the result of this merge was the birth of Standard Athletic Club, (Note: Some sources mistakenly indicate that the club's founding date was 1 March 1890, such as the club's website.) whose seventeen British founders were the members of those two clubs, most notably the Wynns, Neville Tunmer, and William Attrill, the latter serving as the club's first captain. This group of football pioneers wanted the young British people living in Paris to have the opportunity to continue the sports that they had been playing across the English Channel.

Standard AC joined the USFSA in March 1894, and on 22 April of the same year, the Wynns started in the semifinal of the inaugural USFSA championship, which ended in a 5–0 win over CP Asnières. The Wynns started in the final against Rovers on 6 May, helping their side to a 2–0 win, thus becoming the first national champions in French history. In the final, Wynn, a left-back, played "remarkably well, his way of charging making even the heaviest of his opponents bite the dust". In September 1894, the Wynns founded their own club, which they named United Sports Club, but initially remained members of Standard AC.

=== National hegemony ===
In the following edition, the Wynns once again started in the final for Standard AC, helping their side to another win over the White Rovers, this time by 3–1. In May 1897, the Wynns started in the final of the 1897 USFSA Championship, helping their side to yet another victory over the White Rovers (3–2). In the following year, on 3 April, they started in the final of the 1898 USFSA Championship against Club Français at Courbevoie, which ended in a 3–2 win.

On 26 December 1897, the Wynns started in the very first football match in the history of the Parc des Princes in front of 500 spectators, playing for a team called English Ramblers, which consisted of the best English footballers who played in Paris, mainly from Standard AC, and they helped their side to a 3–1 win over Club Français.

=== United Sports Club ===
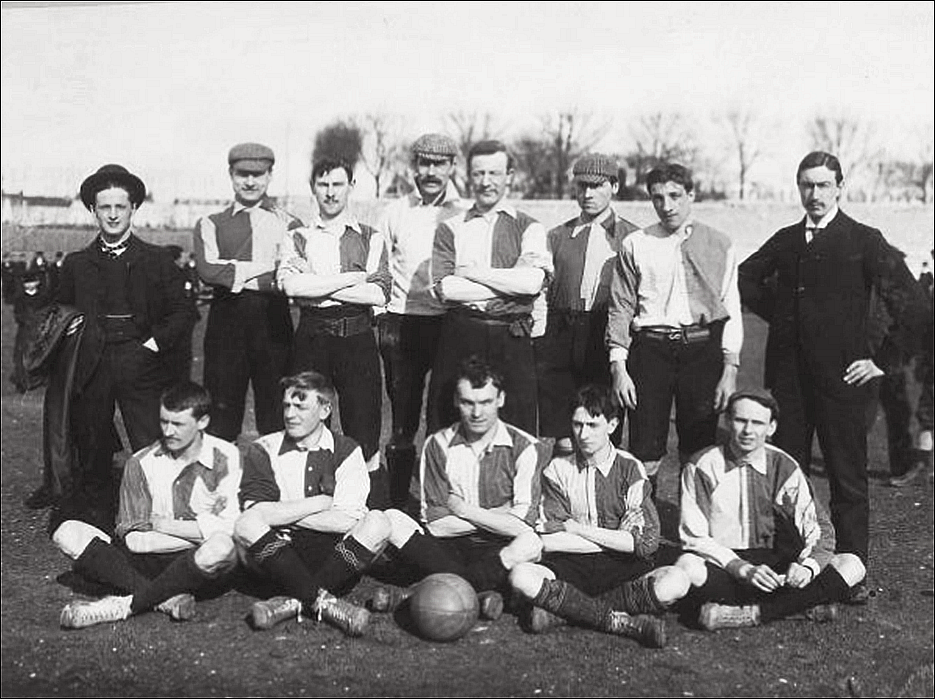
Wynn with the United team before the 1902 Coupe Dewar final on 16 March.

At some point in the late 1890s, the Wynns joined the club they had founded in 1894, United SC, which was then made up of English and Swiss immigrants, and Edouard was eventually joined by his younger brother Aubry. On 16 March 1902, all three of them started in the final of the 1902 Coupe Dewar, which ended in a 1–0 loss to their former club Standard AC.

United then reached the final of the 1901–02 USFSA Paris Championship against Racing Club de France on 6 April, but the team was missing three of its forwards, all of whom were ill or away from Paris for professional reasons, which forced his father Henri, who was also responsible for setting up the tactics and composing the teams, to modify the forward line and select two debutants: Forsyth, a player of Stade Français, and his third son, Aubert, then a player of the third team; despite starting with four members of the Wynn family, United still lost 2–0. In the following year, on 15 March, Edouard and Aubry started on defense in the final of the 1903 Coupe Dewar against Club Français, helping their side to a 4–3 win after extra-time; this victory was considered "the most interesting match of this season which is drawing to a close".

In 1904, the Wynns played a crucial role in helping United win their first-ever USFSA Paris Championship, which they claimed on the last matchday with a 5–1 victory over RC France, the two-time defending champion. This victory qualified the club for the 1904 USFSA national championship, where they lost in the final 4–2 to RC Roubaix on 17 April; the local press stated that "the Wynn trio was outstanding and was applauded many times in the Roubaix camp". Two weeks later, on 1 May 1904, three Wynns, including Edouard, started for United SC, the champions of Paris, in a match against the champions of the FGSPF, Étoile des Deux Lacs, helping their side to a 5–1 win. He seems to have retired shortly after.

=== Reputation as a violent team ===
Beyond its successes, the United SC was particularly noted for the brutality of its players, and likewise, between 1902 and 1906, United SC was the most sanctioned club by the USFSA, with Aubry even being sanctioned twice, which only happened to six players. For instance, during a Paris championship match against RC France on 15 February 1903, Edouard, who "specialises in stopping opposing forwards very hard", missed a charge on Racing's winger, fell, and was "knocked over" by their half-back Guéroult, so he wants to come to blows with him, but his father and captain, Henri, who was not playing in the match, entered the field to punch Guéroult, thus sparking a general brawl which was only stopped by the intervention of the spectators; the local press specified that Henri's behavior was met with the disapproval by his teammates.

United quickly gained a reputation as a violent team, and the Wynn family was primarily responsible for this violence; for instance, following a match against AS Française, the USFSA Football Commission suspended Aubry for eight days for brutality and Edouard for three months for insulting the commission. A press campaign emerged, orchestrated by the French newspaper L'Auto and L'Écho des sports, aimed at presenting United SC as a club to be avoided, with the former stating that "it is always with apprehension that one aligns oneself against United", while the latter stated that "United's leaders recruit each year all that England, German, Switzerland, and other countries have best to offer in terms of brutality". This last comment also illustrates the ambient of xenophobia around a club, which, originally reserved for British nationals, gradually extended its recruitment to German-speaking communities from the mid-1900s. The division was such that during the 1905–06 season, the clubs of the first division of the Paris championship went so far as to consider signing a petition to request the exclusion of United SC from the USFSA championships, but the idea did not come to fruition.

== Honours ==
Standard AC

- USFSA Football Championship: 1894, 1895, 1897, 1898

United Sports Club

- USFSA Football Championship runner-up: 1904
- Coupe Dewar: 1903; runner-up 1902

== Bibliography ==
- Duhamel, Georges (1959). Le football français: ses débuts [French football: its beginnings] (in French). Paris: Imprimerie de la Charente. p. 80.
- Sorez, Julien (2013). Le football dans Paris et ses banlieues: Un sport devenu spectacle [Football in Paris and its suburbs: A sport that has become a spectacle] (in French). Paris: Presses universitaires de Rennes. p. 410. ISBN 978-2-7535264-3-3.
