= Paul Zeiger =

French footballer (1881–1959)

Personal information
- Full name: Paul Marie Joseph Zeiger
- Date of birth: 8 September 1881
- Place of birth: 3rd arrondissement of Lyon, France
- Date of death: 18 February 1959 (aged 77)
- Place of death: 16th arrondissement of Paris, France
- Position: Midfielder

Senior career*
Years	Team	Apps	(Gls)
1897–?	United SC		
?–1905	Racing Club de France		
1905–1909	US Parisienne		
1909–1910	Gallia Club		

International career
1907	France	1	(0)
- * Club domestic league appearances and goals

Paul Marie Joseph Zeiger (8 September 1881 – 18 February 1959) was a French footballer who played as a midfielder for Racing Club de France, US Parisienne, and the French national team in the early 20th century.

== Career ==
Born in 3rd arrondissement of Lyon on 8 September 1881, (Note: Some sources wrongly state that he was born on 1 January 1887.) Zeiger was already playing in the first team of United SC as early as April 1897, aged 15. On 31 March 1901, he started in the final of the 1901 Coupe Dewar, which ended in a 3–0 loss to Standard AC. Together with Pierre Allemane, André Puget, the Matthey brothers (Fernand and Raoul), and captain Alfred Tunmer, Zeiger was a member of the Racing team that reached back-to-back finals of the USFSA Football Championship in 1902 and 1903, both of which ending in losses to RC Roubaix.

Nicknamed "the Walking Frog," Zeiger had a bad habit of arriving late to his games. Zeiger was playing for US Parisienne when he earned his first (and only) international cap for France in a friendly match against Belgium at Uccle on 21 April 1907, helping his side to a 2–1 win; France's first-ever away victory. He had to wait over a year for his next chance to wear the shirt of France, when the USFSA selected him for the would-be France C squad that was originally listed to compete in the football tournament of the 1908 Olympic Games, but Zeiger ended up not traveling to London because the USFSA decided to send only two instead of three teams.

In 1908, Zeiger was a member of the US Parisienne squad that participated in the Torneo Internazionale Stampa Sportiva, where they faced two clubs from Turin: Torino and Juventus. In 1909, he moved to Gallia Club, and on 8 May 1910, he started in the final of the 1910 Coupe Dewar at the Stade de Charentonneau, which ended in a 3–1 loss to CA Paris.

== Later life and death ==
During the First World War, Zeiger was incorporated into the 406th Infantry Regiment, fighting twice on the Somme, twice at Verdun, and was wounded three times in total, the last time seriously in the right arm, requiring a ligature of the humeral bone.

Zeiger died in 16th arrondissement of Paris on 18 February 1959, at the age of 77.

== Honours ==
Racing Club de France

- USFSA Football Championship runner-up: 1902, 1903
- Coupe Dewar runner-up: 1901

Gallia Club

- Coupe Dewar runner-up: 1910
