= 1897 Club Français v English Ramblers football match =

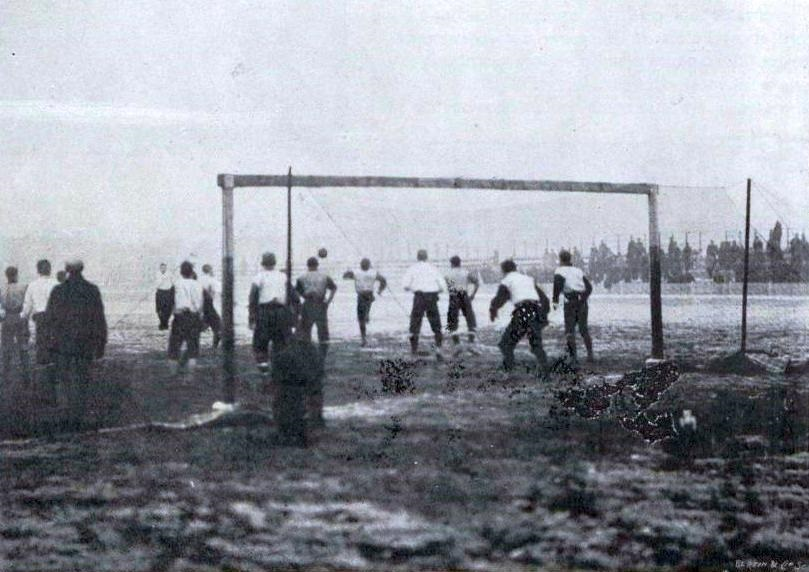
- The match between Club Français and English Ramblers at the Parc des Princes on 26 December 1897
- Event: First match at the Parc des Princes
Club Français	English Ramblers
(France)	(England)
1	3
- Date: 26 December 1897
- Venue: Parc des Princes, Paris
- Referee: Jack Wood
- Attendance: 500
- Weather: Cold

The 1897 Club Français v English Ramblers football match was a football match that took place at the Parc des Princes, Paris, on 27 December 1897.

The match was contested by the former champions of France, Club Français, and a team made up of English players known as English Ramblers, who won by a score of 3–1, but more important than the result was its historical significance, as it was the very first match at the infamous Parc des Princes, as well as one of the first ‘international’ matches in the history of the sport.

== Background ==
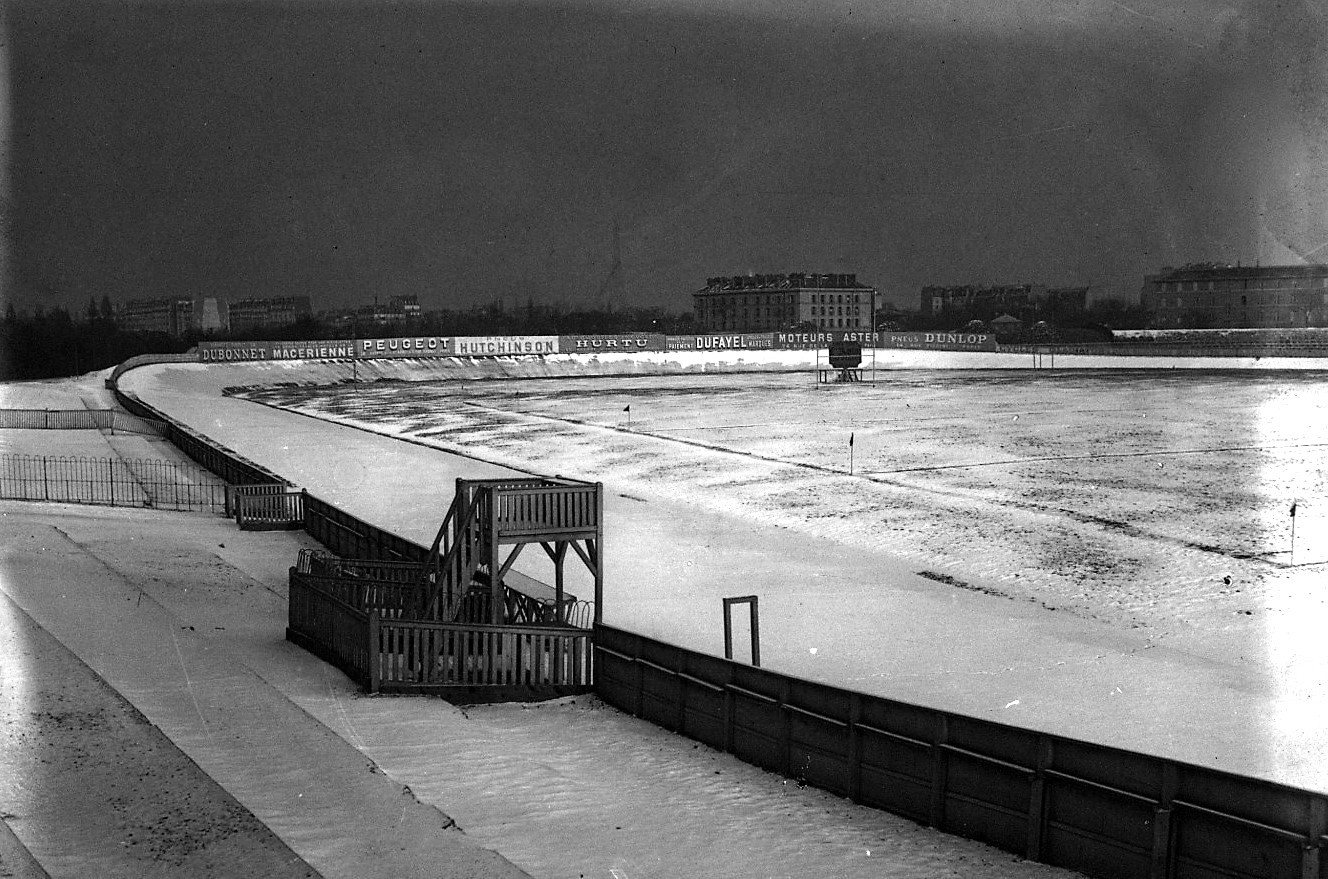
The original Parc des Princes under the snow in 1908.

In April 1896, Club Français became champions of France after winning the 1896 USFSA Football Championship, doing so without losing a single match. The typical team of the Club Français which played in 2–3–5, had the likes of Lucien Huteau, Marcel Lambert, Georges Garnier, Gaston Peltier, and captain Eugène Fraysse.

Originally called Stade Vélodrome du Parc des Princes, the stadium was inaugurated in the 16th arrondissement of Paris on 18 July 1897, in front of 7000 people. The velodrome had a track of 728 yards, and a capacity of more than 3,000 seats. As early as 25 July 1897, nearly 15,000 cycling fans gathered at the stadium, but at the time, the central lawn was not yet usable for athletic sports. On 14 November 1897, Rugby made its debut at the Parc des Princes, which was followed by football on 26 December 1897, in a match between the former champions of France, Club Français, and the so-called English Ramblers, a team made up of English footballers playing in Parisian clubs, mainly from Standard AC. However, the first club to obtain exclusive use of it was Racing Club de France.

== Overview ==
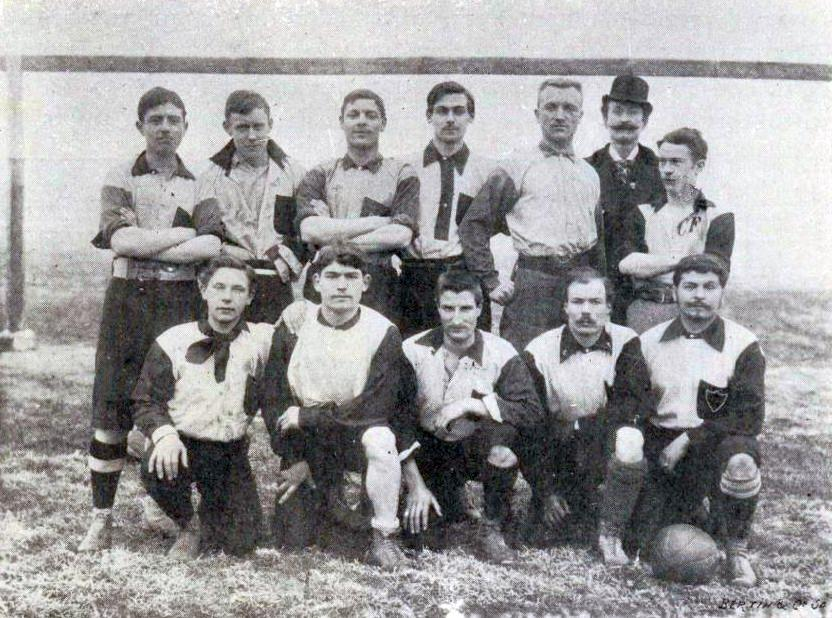
The Club Français team at the Parc des Princes on 26 December 1897.

The match was played in cold weather; for instance, the thermometer marked seven degrees below zero on the eve of the match. Even though admission was cheap, the dry cold of those days, the formidable competition presented by skating, the fatigue of Christmas, and the family obligations of those festive days resulted in a rather meager audience of just 500 people, including a few sports journalists, such as Paul Champ of Le Vélo, Paul Puy and Moignard of the New York Herald, Leclercq of La Presse, and Adolphe de Pallissaux of Le Journal des sports. The latter was disappointed by the underwhelming crowd, stating in his chronicle that he had hoped "the public would have come in greater numbers to witness this interesting and, for them, instructive match". Other notable figures who attend the game were Pinto de Avanjo, Martell, Guillois, the Bontonneau brothers, every USFSA personality linked to football, and the director of the newly founded stadium, Henri Desgrange, who was a former racing cyclist and founder of the infamous cycling magazine L'Auto. The match was refereed by Jack Wood, and the linesmen were Noël Jacques and Roberts, both from Club Français.

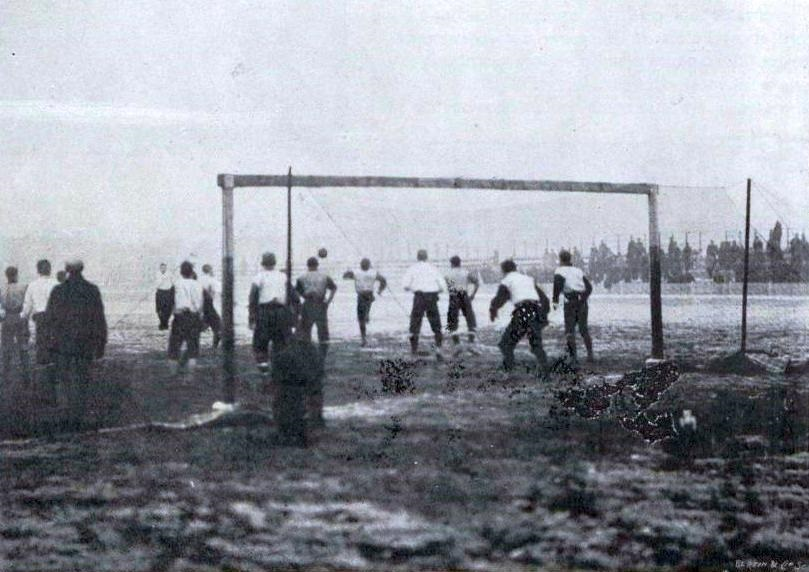
The match between Club Français and English Ramblers at the Parc des Princes on 26 December 1897.

From the start of the game, Club Français took the offensive and forced the Ramblers to work. Little by little, however, the English recovered and pushed the ball back to the center of the field by the 10th minute. Block and Gaston Peltier, however, bring it back towards the English goal, and after a nice pass from the latter, Bruno scores the opening goal of the match to give a 1–0 lead to Club Français. The Ramblers start to play with more cohesion and H. F. Roques threatened the French camp, but Français' goalkeeper Lucien Huteau saved the shot. In a free kick, Strittmatter even scored a second goal for the French, but since no one had touched the ball, the goal was not counted. The Ramblers then took the offensive and, on several occasions, Codman and Hicks seriously threatened the French goal, but without result, thanks to the composure of Huteau who each time stopped the ball. However, on a nice pass between the French defenders, Lowe scored the equalizer just before half-time. The first half thus ended tied at one goal.

As soon as play resumed, Club Français attacked with energy, and Club Français approached the enemy goal several times with Laisné, Bruno, Peltier, and Block making very good passes, but Français' captain Eugène Fraysse, a little dizzy after falling against a post, missed his kick each time. In stark contrast, Gaillard made "superb kicks" and Marshall made "marvelous kicks". With 15 minutes to go, Codman, the captain of the Ramblers team, scored his side's second goal, which demoralized Club Français: Huteau, until then impeccable, lost all composure; Laisné, who was somewhat bruised by a fall, stopped chasing down his ball; and Fraysse was still stunned. Taking advantage of the disjointed play of the French, Bone scored another goal, just two minutes before the end of the game. The referee Jack Wood whistled shortly after, proclaiming the victory of the Ramblers by 3 goals to 1.

According to the chronicles of the match, the best players were Marshall and Hicks of the Ramblers, and Peltier and Bruno of Club Français.

== Final details ==
27 December 1897

Club Français (France)	1–3	(England) English Ramblers
Bruno 15'	Report	Lowe 40'; Codman 75'; Bone 88'

Parc des Princes, Paris, France
Attendance: 500
Referee: Jack Wood

GK	1	(France) Lucien Huteau
DF	2	(England) Sid Wood
DF	3	(France) Virgile Gaillard
MF	4	(France) Marcel Lambert
MF	5	(France) Alfred Bloch
MF	6	(Germany) Strittmatter
FW	7	(France) Bruno
FW	8	(France) Gaston Peltier
FW	9	(France) Laisné
FW	10	(France) René Grandjean
FW	11	(France) Eugène Fraysse (Cap.)

GK	1	(England) Henri Wynn
DF	2	(England) Edouard Wynn
DF	3	(England) Marshall
MF	4	(England) Norris
MF	5	(England) Philip Tomalin
MF	6	(England) Boot
FW	7	(England) Codman (Cap.)
FW	8	(England) O. Hicks
FW	9	(England) Lowe
FW	10	(England) Henry Bone
FW	11	(England) H. F. Roques

== Aftermath ==
Some local newspapers, still quite unsure of how the rules of the sport worked, reported that the Englishmen had won by ‘three points to one’. After the match, former Rugby union player Adolphe de Pallissaux and journalist of the Le Journal des sports rushed to some of his countrymen to find out their opinions on the result of the game, with the desolated Huteau stating that "Marshall single-handedly brought about the victory of our adversaries!", while Fraysse, still dazed, had imagined having played a championship match and was therefore sad. Pallissaux described the match as "beautiful and splendid. French and English played with cohesion, and the combinations gave way to brilliant individual plays". He finished his chronicle by stating: "we hope for more favorable weather, an interesting game and finally a French victory [against the English] for the next match".

At the time, football players used to shower after every training session or game, but the water pipes were frozen, so the Club Français players had to return to Paris without being able to "even clean the tip of their noses". Pallissaux raised awareness about this issue in his chronicle, stating: "Football is a winter game, so it is expected that the cold will play this same trick again during future matches and it would cost little to take the necessary precautions to ensure the functioning of the shower, or at least to put water available to crew members, because they must be able, at the end of the game, to take care of themselves according to the laws of hygiene".

Just four months later, on 3 April 1898, the likes of Hicks, Lowe, Bone, Tomalin, the Wynn brothers, and Roques started for Standard AC against Club Français in the final of the 1898 USFSA Football Championship at Courbevoie, which ended in a 3–2 victory to Standard.

== See also ==
Football in France
