= Rivaz (surname) =

Rivaz or de Rivaz is a surname. Notable people with the surname include:

- Alice Rivaz (1901–1998), Swiss author
- Charles Montgomery Rivaz (1845–1926), British colonial administrator
- Claude Rivaz (1872–1958), English artist and footballer
- François Isaac de Rivaz (1752–1828), French inventor and politician
- Pierre de Rivaz (1711–1772), French clockmaker
- Vincent de Rivaz (born 1953), French businessman
