= Eugène Nicolaï =

French footballer (1885–1958)

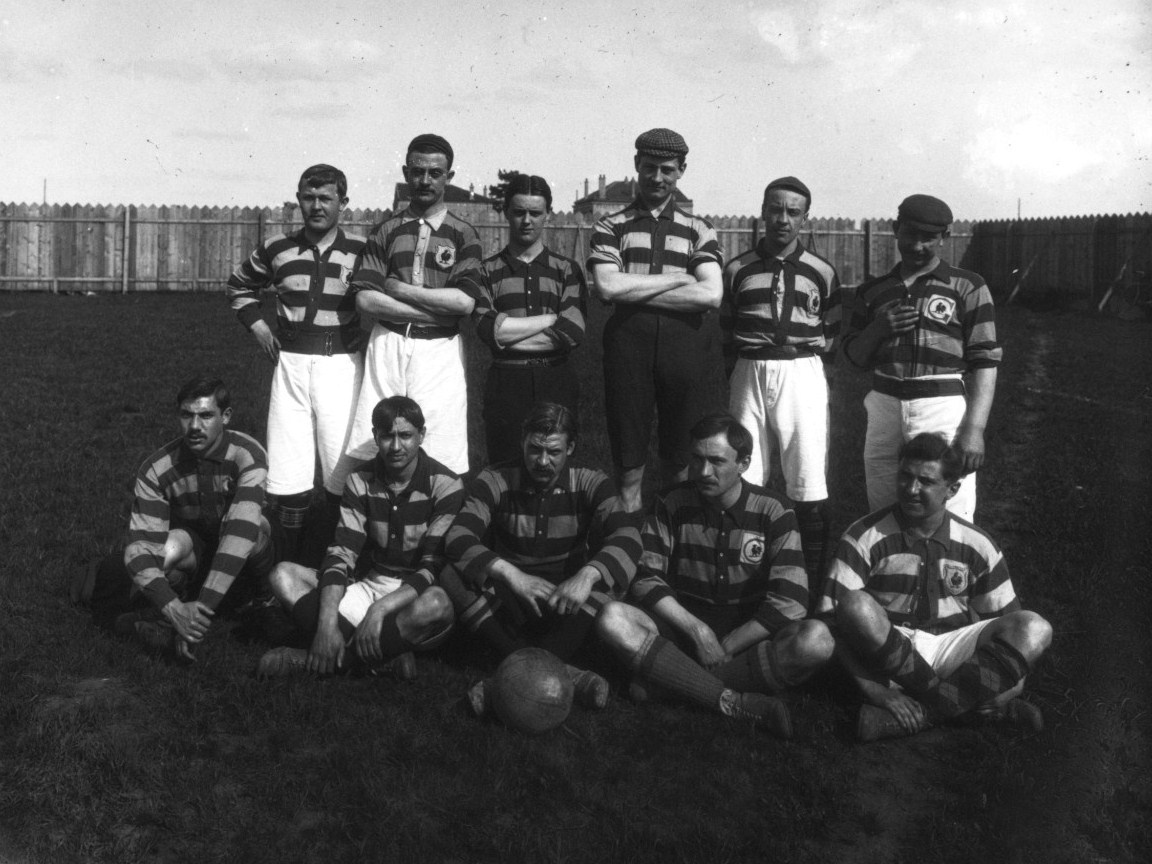
- Nicolaï (seated in the centre) with the Gallia Club in 1906

Personal information
- Full name: Georges Eugène Nicolaï
- Date of birth: 26 June 1885
- Place of birth: 16th arrondissement of Paris, France
- Date of death: 18 February 1958 (aged 72)
- Place of death: 17th arrondissement of Paris, France
- Height: 1.62 m (5 ft 4 in)
- Position: Midfielder

Senior career*
Years	Team	Apps	(Gls)
1903–1905	US Suisse		
1905–1909	Gallia Club		
1909–1910	Stade Français		
1910–1913	Red Star AC		

International career
1905	France	2	(0)
1905	Northern France	+1	(+0)
1905–1910	France (unofficial)	3	(0)
- * Club domestic league appearances and goals

Georges Eugène Nicolaï (26 June 1885 – 18 February 1958) was a French footballer who played as a midfielder for US Suisse and the French national team.

== Club career ==
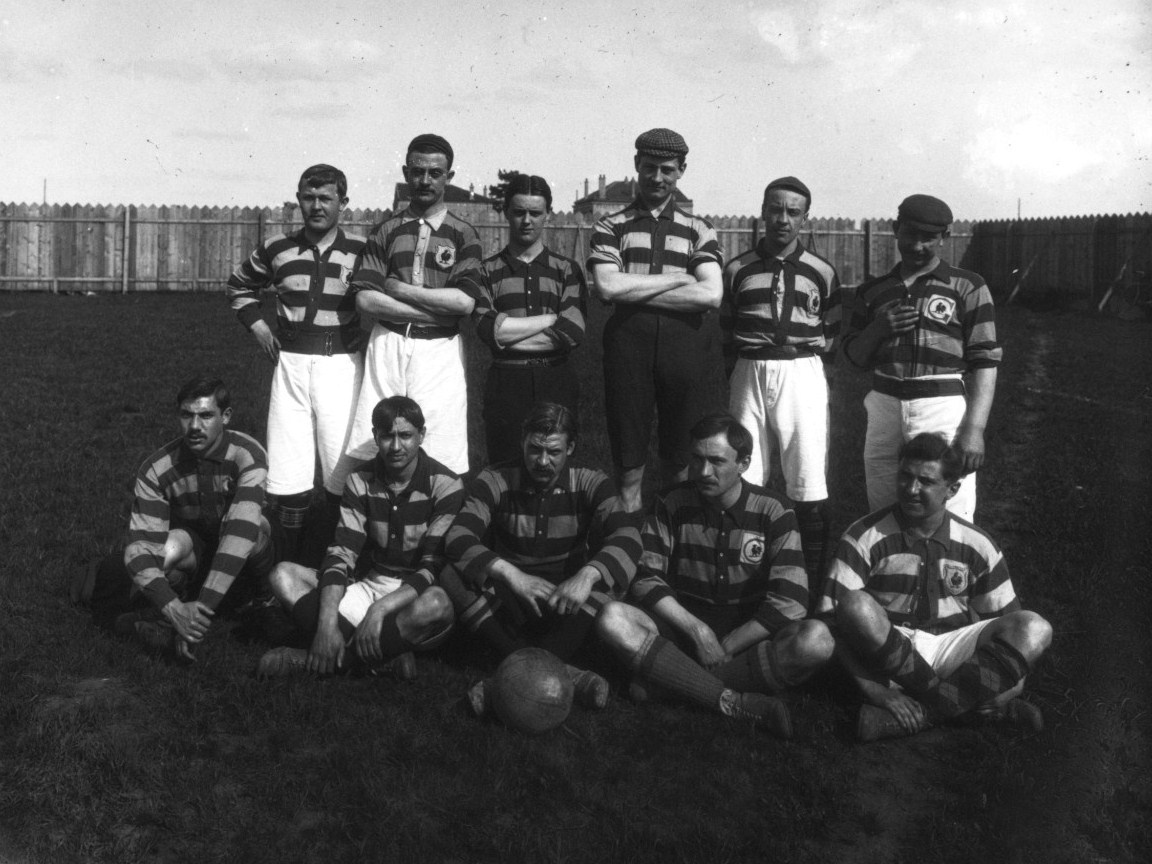
Nicolaï (seated in the centre) with the Gallia Club that played the 1906 Coupe Dewar final

Georges Eugène Nicolaï was born in the 16th arrondissement of Paris on 26 June 1885, as the son of an Italian immigrant, who settled in Paris as a cabinetmaker. He began his career as a halfback at US Suisse, a club of English and Swiss immigrants, and in 1904, the 19-year-old Nicolaï won the USFSA Paris championship, and this victory qualified the club for the 1904 USFSA national championship, in which they lost in the final to RC Roubaix (4–2).

Nicolaï stayed loyal to the club as late as October 1905, but he eventually left for Gallia Club, playing a crucial role in helping the team reach the final of the Coupe Dewar in 1906, held at the Stade de Charentonneau on 6 May, which ended in a 2–1 loss to Racing Club de France. On 18 April 1909, he started in the final of the 1909 Coupe Dewar at Stade de Charentonneau, which ended in a 5–0 win over AS Française.

Following a brief stint at Stade Français, Nicolaï signed for the wealthy Red Star AC, which practiced "brown" amateurism. On 12 March 1911, he started in the final of the 1910–11 LFA Championship at the Charentonneau, which ended in a 1–0 loss to CA Paris. In the following year, however, he helped the club win the 1912 LFA Football Championship, and this victory allowed the club to compete in the Trophée de France, which then served as an inter-federation national championship, losing its final to Étoile des deux lacs (1–3).

== International career ==
Nicolaï made his debut for the national team in their second-ever match on 12 February 1905, which was a friendly match against Switzerland, helping France to its first-ever victory (1–0). Later that year, on 7 May, he earned his second international cap for France, this time against Belgium, which ended in a resounding 7–0 loss.

Between these two games, in March, Nicolaï also played for France in an unofficial match against a London XI, which ended in a 3–1 loss (which is why the FFF yearbooks credited Nicolaï with three selections up until 1991), and in April, he played for Paris in the very first Paris-Nord match, helping his side to a 4–1 win. Nicolaï played a further two unofficial matches for France, both against England AFA, first on 18 March 1909 in Colombes (0–8), and then on 12 March 1910 in Ipswich, the latter ending in a resounding 20–2 loss.

In 1908, Nicolaï was selected for the would-be France C squad that was originally listed to compete in the football tournament of the 1908 Olympic Games, but he ended up not traveling to London because the USFSA decided to send only two instead of three teams.

== Later life ==
Nicolaï made his military service between 1906 and 1908, being mobilized in August 1914 when the First World War broke out. He joined his unit and fought, being wounded in the left arm in November 1914, so he was therefore evacuated, but the reform commission, which had initially declared him unfit in September 1915, reversed its decision and annulled it in November, which meant that Nicolaï had to return to the Western Front in January 1916. On 23 March 1916, however, he was declared a deserter, and the gendarmerie, which was tasked with finding them, arrested Nicolaï just a month later, on 24 April 1916. He was thus sentenced for "desertion within" (to be distinguished from desertion before the enemy), to five years in prison.

A few months later, however, Nicolaï, who had been given a second chance to avoid prison, agreed to return to the front in June 1916, believing he could hold out, but he broke again during Verdun, so on 1 August 1916, he was again declared a deserter, and on 29 August, he was arrested again in Paris by the gendarmes (probably at his father's house) and sentenced a second time on 21 October, for desertion in the face of the enemy. He was thus eligible to be shot, but was instead sentenced to 10 years in prison, and imprisoned in Clairvaux. However, he again did not ultimately serve the sentence in full, taking advantage of the various amnesties granted by the Government, so he was therefore released from prison in 1921 and benefited from the general amnesty law of January 1925, becoming a packer-carpenter and cabinetmaker in the Place des Ternes, located in the 17th arrondissement of Paris.

When he was released in 1921, the 36-year-old Nicolaï attempted to return to his former club Red Star, but the deserter was not welcomed there.

== Death ==
Nicolaï died in the 17th arrondissement of Paris on 18 February 1958, at the age of 72.

== Honours ==
US Suisse

- USFSA Paris Championship: 1903–04
- USFSA Football Championship runner-up: 1904

Gallia Club

- Coupe Dewar: 1909; runner-up 1906

Red Star

- LFA Football Championship: 1912; runner-up 1911, 1913
- Trophée de France runner-up: 1912
