= Henry Bone (disambiguation) =

Henry Bone (1755–1834), English enamel painter

Henry Bone may also refer to:

- Henry Pierce Bone (1779–1855), English enamel painter
- Henry Bone (footballer), English footballer
