= Jacques Davy =

French footballer (1883-1944)

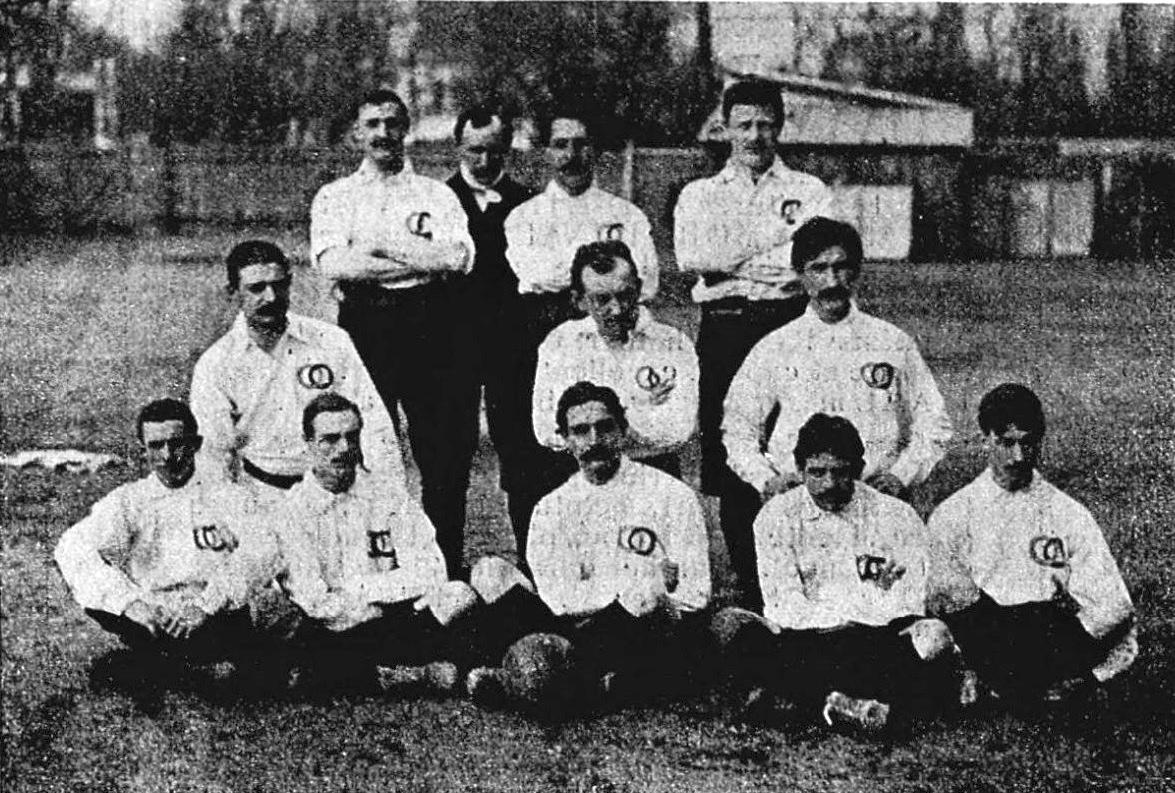
- USFSA team in 1904. Davy is on the right in the second row.

Personal information
- Full name: Jacques Albert Davy
- Date of birth: 26 September 1883
- Place of birth: Paris, France
- Date of death: 12 October 1944 (aged 61)
- Place of death: Paris, France
- Height: 1.75 m (5 ft 9 in)
- Positions: Halfback; fullback

Senior career*
Years	Team	Apps	(Gls)
1903–1905	US Parisienne		

International career
1904	France	1	(0)
- * Club domestic league appearances and goals

Jacques Albert Davy (26 September 1883 – 12 October 1944) was a French footballer who played as a halfback and fullback. He played in the first match of the history of the France national team, a 3–3 draw against Belgium on 1 May 1904. At club level, he played as a footballer for US Parisienne and as a field hockey player for Hockey Club de Paris.
