= Sir Thomas Lipton Trophy =

- The trophy awarded to champions
- Organiser(s): Thomas Lipton
- Founded: 1909
- Abolished: 1911; 115 years ago
- Region: Europe
- Teams: 4
- Related competitions: Torneo Internazionale Stampa Sportiva
- Last champions: (England) West Auckland (1911)
- Most championships: (England) West Auckland (2 titles)

The Sir Thomas Lipton Trophy was an association football competition that took place twice, in Turin, Italy, in 1909 and 1911. It is regarded as an early World trophy. Although it featured only European sides (in a time when the sport was successfully widespread in few non-European countries), its reported objective was to be a World Cup, as reported by FIFA and its contemporary sources.

It is predated by the Torneo Internazionale Stampa Sportiva, which was hosted in 1908 in Turin, and the Football World Championship, which took place between 1887 and 1902.

== Overview ==
Italy, Germany and Switzerland sent their most prestigious club sides to the competition, but The Football Association of England refused to be associated with it and declined the offer to send a team. Not wishing to have England unrepresented in the competition, Thomas Lipton invited West Auckland FC, an amateur side from County Durham and mostly made up of coal miners, to take part. The reason why this team was selected is unknown, although contemporary Italian reports of the team's achievements in the Northern League suggest confusion with the more successful Bishop Auckland. Reports that it was intended to send Woolwich Arsenal, but that West Auckland were invited instead as they shared the same initials and due to Lipton just leaving his secretary a note that said: "contact W.A.", are unlikely to be true; Italian reporting shows they were expecting a team from the Northern League.

West Auckland won the tournament and returned to Italy in 1911 to defend their title. In this second competition, West Auckland beat the then amateur team Juventus 6–1 in the final, and were awarded the trophy outright. The development of football on other continents: Asia, Africa and the Americas was not very advanced and Europe was where the major football was happening.

In January 1994 the original trophy, which was being held in West Auckland Working Men's Club, was stolen. An exact replica of the original trophy was commissioned and is now held by West Auckland FC.

== 1909 tournament ==
=== Participants ===
Team
(Italy) Torino XI (Note: This team was formed from players of mainly clubs Torino and Piemonte. Juventus had refused to be involved.)
(Germany) Stuttgarter Sportfreunde
(England) West Auckland
(Switzerland) Winterthur

=== Results ===
==== Semi-finals ====
1909 Sir Thomas Lipton Trophy
11 April 1909

Stuttgarter Sportfreunde (Germany)	0–2	(England) West Auckland
		Whittington 10'; Dickenson 88' (pen.)

11 April 1909

Torino XI (Italy)	1–2	(Switzerland) Winterthur
Berardo 13'		Lang 25', 55' (pen.)

==== Third place match ====
12 April 1909

Torino XI (Italy)	2–1	(Germany) Stuttgarter Sportfreunde
Debernardi 35'; Zuffi II 75'		Kipp 15'

==== Final ====
12 April 1909

West Auckland (England)	2–0	(Switzerland) Winterthur
R. Jones 6' (pen.); J. Jones 8'

== 1911 tournament ==
=== Participants ===
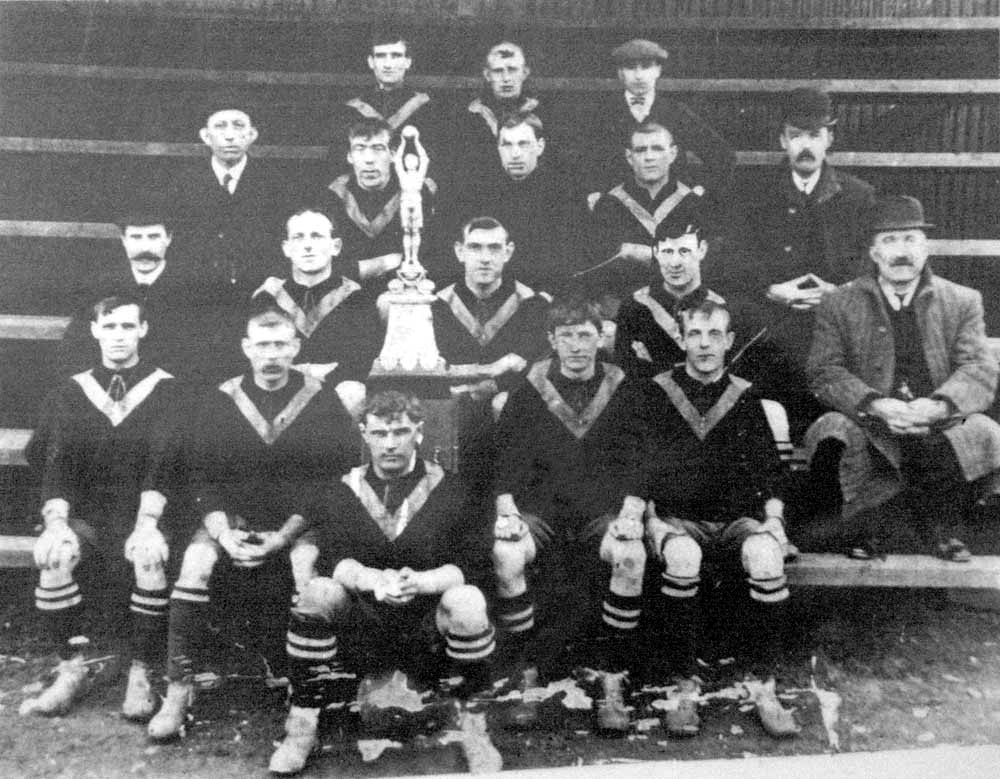
West Auckland with the Thomas Lipton Cup in 1911

Team
(England) West Auckland
(Italy) Juventus
(Italy) Torino
(Switzerland) FC Zürich

=== Results ===
==== Semi-finals ====
1911 Sir Thomas Lipton Trophy
9 or 16 April 1911

Zürich (Switzerland)	0–2	(England) West Auckland

9 or 16 April 1911

Juventus (Italy)	2–0	(Italy) Torino

==== Third place match ====
17 April

Torino (Italy)	2–1	(Switzerland) Zürich

==== Final ====
1911 Sir Thomas Lipton Trophy Final
17 April

Juventus (Italy)	1–6	(England) West Auckland
Corbelli	Report	Moore 3', 50'; Appleby 9'; Rewcastle 11'; Dunn 14', 55'

Juventus

West Auckland

West Auckland: J Robinson; Tom Wilson, Charlie Cassidy; Andy "Chips" Appleby, Michael Alderson, Bob "Drol" Moore; Fred Dunn, Joe Rewcastle, Bob Jones, Bob Guthrie, Charlie "Dirty" Hogg, T Riley, John Warick

Officials: M S C Barron, E Meek, W Nolli, R Hodgson, R Chamberlain

== In popular culture ==
Moving Adverts of Dubai has worked with video maker Rob Kilburn on an account of the story, Our Cup of Tea.

Tyne Tees Television produced a dramatisation of the story in 1982, The World Cup: A Captain's Tale.

== See also ==
- 1895 World Championship
- Évence Coppée Trophy
