= Torneo Internazionale Stampa Sportiva =

- Organiser(s): La Stampa Sportiva
- Founded: 1908
- Abolished: 1908; 118 years ago
- Region: Europe
- Teams: 4
- Related competitions: Sir Thomas Lipton Trophy
- Last champions: (Switzerland) Servette (1908)
- Most championships: (Switzerland) Servette (1 title)

The Torneo Internazionale Stampa Sportiva (English: The Sport Press International Tournament) was an early international football competition. Held in 1908, it predated the more famous Sir Thomas Lipton Trophy by a year.

Organised by Italian La Stampa Sportiva (a weekly sports supplement to newspaper La Stampa), the Torneo Internazionale featured teams from Italy, France, Switzerland and Germany. All games were played in Turin, Italy. Swiss team Servette FC were eventual winners, beating Torino of Italy 3–1.

== Overview ==
The Italian football authorities, whilst pleased with the tournament, were aware that the absence of an English team made the tournament not truly 'international'. Thomas Lipton agreed and, in a gesture of thanks to the Italians who had honoured him, donated the Sir Thomas Lipton Trophy. He told them that he would organise an English team to participate in the next competition, that was held in 1909.

Lipton wanted a team from the Northern League in England to come over to Turin and his decision led to the participation of West Auckland FC from County Durham in the 1909 and 1911 tournaments. The team of miners won both these tournaments. West Auckland experienced a heavy penalty for their participation in the Trophy. A statue to their success stands in the centre of their village today.

== Qualifying ==
(Italian only)

22 March 1908

Juventus (Kingdom of Italy)	4–1 (a.e.t)	Piemonte (Kingdom of Italy)
Borel; Goccione; Donna; Brusa (o.g.)		F. Berardo

29 March 1908

Torino (Kingdom of Italy)	2–1	(Kingdom of Italy) Ausonia Milano

=== Qualifying final ===
12 April 1908

Torino (Kingdom of Italy)	2–1	(Kingdom of Italy) Juventus
Pozzi; Debernardi		Donna

== Tournament ==
=== Participants ===
Team
(France) US Parisienne
(German Empire) Freiburger FC (Note: The team then withdrew the tournament, being replaced by Italian club Juventus.)
(Kingdom of Italy) Torino
(Switzerland) Servette

=== First round ===
19 April 1908

Servette (Switzerland)	5–3	(German Empire) Freiburger FC

19 April 1908

Torino (Kingdom of Italy)	4–0	(France) US Parisienne
Squair; Debernardi (pen.)

=== Third place ===
20 April 1908

Juventus (Kingdom of Italy)	4–0	(France) US Parisienne
Borel; Goccione

=== Final ===
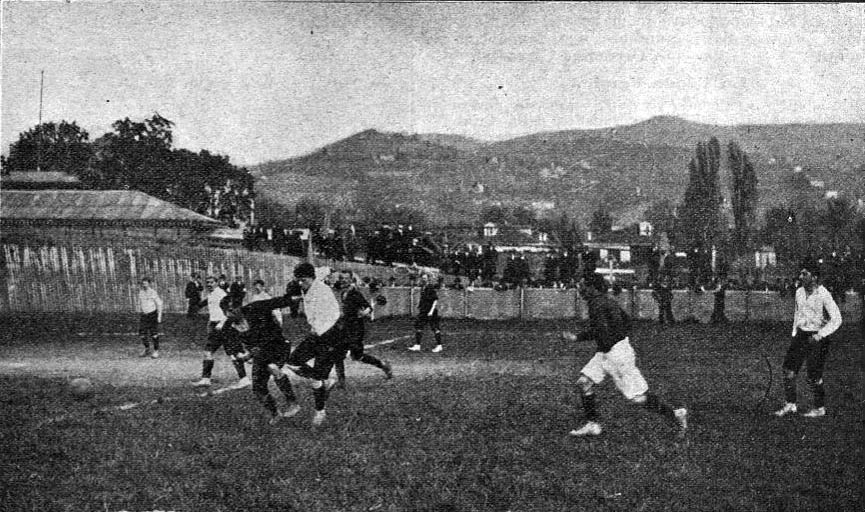
Scene of the final

Torneo Internazionale Final
20 April 1908
17:00

Torino (Kingdom of Italy)	1–3	(Switzerland) Servette
Pozzi	Report	Nett; Henneberg

Torino
Servette

== See also ==
- Sir Thomas Lipton Trophy
