= Claude Rivaz =

English footballer

Personal information
- Full name: Claude Farnworth Rivaz
- Date of birth: 26 November 1872
- Place of birth: Chorley, Cheshire, England
- Date of death: 24 March 1958 (aged 85)
- Place of death: Basingstoke, Hampshire, England
- Position: Defender

Senior career*
Years	Team	Apps	(Gls)
1891–1894	Royal Antwerp		
1894–1896	White Rovers		

International career
1895–1898	Paris XI	2	(0)
- * Club domestic league appearances and goals

Claude Farnworth Rivaz (26 November 1872 – 24 March 1958) was an English artist and footballer who played as a defender for Royal Antwerp and White Rovers.

== Early life and education ==
Claude Rivaz was born in Chorley, Cheshire, on 26 November 1872, as the elder son of John Vincent Claude Rivaz (1831–1893) and Catherine Farnworth (1846–1934). (Note: Some sources wrongly state that he was born on 11 November 1872, while others that he was born in December 1872.) He had an older sister, Ida Gertrude (1871–1953), and three younger siblings: Francis Clifton (1876–1959), Charles Warwick (1880–1952), and Vera Mildred (1881–1968).

On 27 April 1887, the 14-year-old Rivaz entered Westminster School, remaining there for three years, until April 1890, when he left as an artist. He then went abroad to complete his artist studies at the Royal Academy of Fine Arts in Antwerp, where he lived for three years, from 1891 until 1894.

== Playing career ==
=== Antwerp FC ===
Whilst out in the Belgian capital, Rivaz became the chairman of Antwerp Cricket Club (founded in 1880), which held several sports among its members, such as cricket and tennis in the summer, while union rugby and football was playing in the winter. Rivas was one of the many English pioneers of the club's football team, Royal Antwerp, with whom he played for three years, from 1891 until 1894, when he left for Paris to join the White Rovers.

=== The White Rovers ===
Together with William Sleator, Walter Hewson, Robert MacQueen, and the Wood brothers (Jack and Sid), Rivaz was a member of the group of upper-middle-class Anglo-British that served as the core of the White Rovers FC. He is the only member of this group of whom there are known photographs.

On 24 February 1895, Rivaz, together with Jack Wood, Eugène Fraysse, Charles Bernat, and William Attrill, was a member of the first representative team of Paris, which played a friendly match against the London-based Folkestone at the soggy pitch of the Seine Velodrome; Paris lost 0–3.

== Later life and death ==
Rivaz worked as an artist after his sports career. At the time of the 1901 United Kingdom census, Rivaz was in Vancouver, Canada, but eventually returned to live in London's Mayfair.

On 13 August 1913, Rivaz married Hilda Lilia Spencer (1878–1943), the only daughter of Frederick Mountford Spencer, and the couple had at least two sons, including John born in 1919. He died just outside Basingstoke on 24 March 1958, at the age of 85. He was buried four days later at the Henley Road Cemetery in Caversham.
