= Maurice Guichard =

French footballer (1884–1922)

Personal information
- Full name: Maurice Louis Guichard
- Date of birth: 11 March 1879
- Place of birth: Paris, France
- Date of death: 25 January 1922 (aged 42)
- Place of death: Paris, France
- Height: 1.64 m (5 ft 5 in)
- Position: Goalkeeper

Senior career*
Years	Team	Apps	(Gls)
1896–1902	UA 1er		
1902–1905	US Parisienne		

International career
1904–1905	France	2	(0)
- * Club domestic league appearances and goals

Maurice Louis Guichard (11 March 1879 – 25 January 1922) was a French footballer who played as a goalkeeper. He made two appearances for the France national team from 1904 to 1905. At club level, he played for US Parisienne.
