= US Parisienne =

Defunct football club based in Paris, France

- Full name: Union Sportive Parisienne
- Founded: c. 1897
- Dissolved: 1909

Union Sportive Parisienne (French: Union sportive parisienne) was a football club based in Paris, France. The club was founded around 1897 and ceased operations in 1909. Red and black were the club colours.

In the 1900s, the club participated in eight seasons of the Championnat de Paris organized by the Union des Sociétés Françaises de Sports Athlétiques. Five of the club's players played for the France national team in its early years, including three in the team's first match in 1904. In 1908, US Parisienne participated in the Torneo Internazionale Stampa Sportiva, where they faced two clubs from Turin: Torino and Juventus. Ahead of the 1909–10 season, the club ceased operations.

== Notable players ==
- (France) Georges Crozier
- (France) Jacques Davy
- (France) Maurice Guichard
- (France) Marius Royet
- (France) Paul Zeiger
