= Enrico Debernardi =

Italian footballer (1885-1972)

Personal information
- Full name: Enrico Debernardi
- Date of birth: 7 December 1885
- Place of birth: Turin, Italy
- Date of death: 9 November 1972 (aged 86)
- Place of death: Turin, Italy
- Position: Forward

Senior career*
Years	Team	Apps	(Gls)
1903	Audace Torino	?	(?)
1907–1913	Torino	43	(7)

International career
1910–1911	Italy	3	(1)
- * Club domestic league appearances and goals

Enrico Debernardi (Italian pronunciation: [enˈriːko deberˈnardi]; 7 December 1885 – 9 November 1972) was an Italian footballer who played as a forward. He was part of the first-ever team fielded by the Italy national team in 1910.

== Biography ==
In 1909, Debernardi was a member of the Torino XI that participated in the 1909 Sir Thomas Lipton Trophy, regarded by many as the first European club trophy. In the tournament, he scored a goal in a 2-1 victory over Sportfreunde Stuttgart to secure his team a third-place finish.

On 15 May 1910, Debernardi went down in history as one of the eleven footballers who played in the first game of the Italy national team, helping his nation to a 6-2 home win over France with a goal. He earned two more caps for Italy, both against Hungary and both ending in defeats.
