= Richmond Town F.C. =

Association football club

Richmond Town
- Full name: Richmond Town Football Club
- Founded: 1945; 81 years ago
- Ground: Dave Clark Arena
- Coordinates: 54.4001°N 1.7389°W
- Chairman: Paul Ramsay
- League: Wearside League; Premier Division
- Website: http://richmondtownfc.co.uk/
Home colours	Away colours

Richmond Town Football Club are a football club based in Richmond, North Yorkshire, England.

Richmond were founded in 1945. In 2012, Richmond joined the Wearside League from the Teesside League. As of 2023–24, they play in Wearside League Premier Division in level 7 of the National League System.

Richmond Town Women play in the North Riding Women's Premier League.

== Grounds ==
Richmond Town men's first team play at the Dave Clark Arena at Richmond School.

Richmond's other teams play at Earls Orchard, nestled by Richmond Castle, which was also home of the first team until 2021. The pavilion was officially opened in 1975 by Jack Charlton, then manager of Middlesbrough F.C. In the 2020 book British Football's Greatest Grounds, Earls Orchard was voted one of the top grounds to visit in the country. It was placed in the top ten non-league grounds in the country by The Non-League Paper, and in the top five most historic non-league grounds by Non-League Insider.

== Teams ==
As of 2009, Richmond Town FC have 5 senior teams, 11 junior teams, and a girls' team.
