= Jack Wood (referee) =

English footballer and referee (1872–1921)

Personal information
- Birth name: John Bertram Wood
- Date of birth: 20 October 1872
- Place of birth: Tottenham, England
- Date of death: 10 October 1921 (aged 48)
- Place of death: Neuilly-sur-Seine, France
- Position: Forward

Senior career*
Years	Team	Apps	(Gls)
1891–1892	White Rovers		
1893	Robin Hood F.C.		
1894–1897	White Rovers		
1897–1898	Standard AC		
1898–1899	Club Français		
1899	White Rovers		
1900–1901	United Sports Club		

International career
1895–1898	Paris XI	2	(0)
- * Club domestic league appearances and goals

John Bertram Wood (20 October 1872 – 10 October 1921) was an English footballer and referee. He is best known for being the fundamental head behind the foundation of French club White Rovers in 1891, one of the first football clubs in Paris, and then serving the club as its captain in the mid-1890s. He then became a referee and officiated at the football tournament of the 1900 Summer Olympics, in which he oversaw a match between the representative sides of France and Belgium. He also refereed a match between the official sides of those two nations on 22 April 1906.

His brother Sid also played for White Rovers.

== Early life ==
John Bertram Wood was born in Tottenham on 20 October 1872, (Note: Some sources wrongly claim that he was born in either Middlesex or Devon.) as the son of a draper, and as the second of three brothers, the elder Thomas William, born in Edmonton, and the younger Frank Sidney "Sid", born in Dalston. In 1881 the family lived at 22, Tilson Road, still a mere four hundred yards from White Hart Lane.

== Playing career ==
=== Early career and education ===
Wood began to play football in North London, where he became an amateur player. He stayed at Lancing College until presumably 1889–90, aged 17 or 18, and in the following year, in 1891, he moved to Paris to continue his education, and as soon as he arrived there, he immediately tried to join a football club. After a fruitless search (since there was practically none at the time), however, his main priorities became forming a football club in the French capital, so he could organize and play football in his new home.

Within a few months of his arrival in his new country, Jack Wood, together with other football pioneers in the city, mostly made up of a curious group of upper-middle-class Anglo-British, such as William Sleator, Walter Hewson, Robert MacQueen, and Claude Rivaz, formed the White Rovers Football Club after a meeting at the Café Français on rue Pasquier in Paris, where they voted narrowly to play association football rather than rugby union rules, thus founding one of the first football club in Paris. They were named the White Rovers because of the white shirts they wore. He then attended the Trinity College, Oxford in 1892, aged 20. He then played for Robin Hood F.C. in 1893, winning the Middlesex Junior Cup.

=== The White Rovers ===
White Rovers was one of the most important clubs in the amateur beginnings of football in France, being one of the six football clubs that participated in France's first-ever football championship in 1894, where after an 11–0 win over CA Neuilly and a surprisingly meager 1–0 win against Club Français, scoring fifteen minutes from the end of the match by MacBain, on a corner kick taken by Wood, slightly helped by the wind. They met Standard AC in the final, but despite Wood captaining by example and scoring once in a 2–2 draw, the Rovers ended as runners-up after losing the replay 0–2. Among his teammates in 1894, there were Ernest Cotton, Cox, MacQueen, and his brother Sid. In October 1894, Wood was the team captain alongside Cotton, but in December, the latter decided to leave both the team and Paris.

On 24 February 1895, Wood, together with Eugène Fraysse, Charles Bernat, and William Attrill, was a member of the first representative team of Paris, which played a friendly match against the London-based Folkestone at the soggy pitch of the Seine Velodrome; Paris lost 0–3. In January 1897, Wood scored a goal to help the Rovers to a 3–0 win over FC Levallois.

Wood also played for Standard AC and Club Français, and likewise, on 13 December 1898, the Woods (Jack and Sid) were among the five players from Club Français who featured in a selection of the best Parisian players from the USFSA in a friendly against a German national selection in front of 200 people; Paris lost 1–2.

On 22 October 1899, Wood assisted the White Rovers' opening goal with an "excellent corner kick" to help his side to a 1–1 draw with United Sports Club. Following the White Rovers' dissolution in 1899, Wood joined United Sports Club.

== Refereeing career ==
=== First steps ===
On 26 December 1897, Wood refereed the very first football match played at the Parc des Princes, in which Club Français was defeated 3–1 by the English Ramblers after a 1–1 draw at half-time.

As a referee, Wood officiated in one of the only two games at the 1900 Paris Olympics, between a French side represented by USFSA and a Belgian side made up almost entirely of students of the University of Brussels, which ended in a 6–2 win for the French side. A few months later, on 23 December 1900, Wood attended the final of the 1900 Coupe Manier between Club Français and UA I arrondissement in Joinville-le-Pont, but it was halted because the organizers of the tournament had somehow forgotten to appoint a referee; fortunately, "a spectator, Mr. Jack Wood of U.S.C.", as well as a former player of CF, offered himself up to the task, and so the final began an hour later, ending in a 1–0 victory in favor of his former club.

During the 1901 United Kingdom census, Wood was in Devon, but the reasons behind this travel remain unclear.

=== French national finals ===
On 2 March 1902, Wood refereed the semifinals of the Coupe Dewar in 1902 between Standard AC and Nationale de Saint-Mandé, which ended in a 3–1 win to the former. In the following month, on 20 April, he refereed the final of the 1902 USFSA Football Championship between RC Roubaix and RC de France, which ended in a 3–3 draw, but after consulting with Wood, the two captains agreed to keep extending the match by 15 minutes until the tie had been broken; however, the winning goal of Roubaix was only scored in the sixth period of extra-time, in the 175th minute, after nearly three hours of play.

On 4 January 1903, Wood refereed the final of the 1902 Coupe Manier between Club Français and Olympique Lillois, which ended in a 7–0 win to his former club; the local press stated that his performance was "impeccable as usual". Two months later, on 15 March, he refereed the final of the 1903 Coupe Dewar, in which United SC defeated his former club (CF) 4–3 after extra-time. Then, in the following month, on 19 April, he refereed the final of the 1903 USFSA Football Championship, which was contested by the same opponents of the 1902 final, and again with a victory for Roubaix (3–1); the local press stated that he "made no mistake".

On 16 April 1905, Wood oversaw the final of the USFSA National Championship between Gallia Club and RC Roubaix at the Parc des Princes, which ended in a 1–0 win to the former thanks to a 118th-minute goal from Raymond Jouve. Moments before, however, a goal had been whistled in favor of Gallia during a scramble near the Roubaix goal line, but after consulting the touch judges, Wood acknowledged that he could not have seen whether the ball had totally crossed the line, and despite the immense pressure of the Parisien crowd at the Parc des Princes to award the goal, he decide otherwise. He refereed matches in France at least until October 1905, when he officiated a USFSA Paris championship match between AS Française and Club athlétique de Paris 14.

=== Later career ===
Throughout his refereeing career, the French press constantly praised his performances, so he eventually became a unanimous referee who was very rarely criticized (an impressive feat for that time); for instance, in 1903, the journalists of the French newspaper L'Auto (the forerunner of L'Équipe) stated that he was "generally considered the best referee". After the 1902 USFSA final, they highlighted his impartiality and described his performance as "simply marvelous", and in March 1904, he was described as "an impeccable referee of remarkable competence and perfect impartiality".

As one of the most renowned referees in French football, Wood inevitably reached international status, and thus, on 22 April 1906, he refereed his first (and only) international match, a meeting between France and Belgium at Stade Français, ending in a 5–0 win to the latter.

== Pioneering the French national team ==
In February 1903, Wood was United SC's representative in the USFSA's football commission. Later that year, Wood decided to invite to Paris the prestigious Corinthians, a club specializing in European tours and who had the best English amateur footballers, to play a match against a French team. It was he who took care of the financing and of the selection of French players, which included 5 provincials, thus no longer being a team exclusively from Paris; however, it included the Swiss Raoul Matthey, thus not being a full French team neither.

This match proved to be the catalyst for the revival of the French national team, which had cooled down since the 1900 Olympic Games, since its success pushed Wood to repeat the effort, aided by a handful of patrons who, in early 1904, created the Société d’Encouragement Football Association (SEFA), an external body independent of the USFSA, the then sports governing body in France. A few weeks later, SEFA secured the financial support of the French newspaper L'Auto thanks to the intervention of one of its journalist, Ernest Weber, and together, they organized two international matches against the English professional club Southampton on 13 and 14 March 1904 at the Parc des Princes; it was then that USFSA's chairman, Robert Guérin, under the risk of giving up control of France's international matches to a parallel organisation, proposed to the Council of the USFSA to form the French national team itself, and therefore, the two French teams that faced Southampton were assembled by the USFSA and by FSAPF, instead of the SEFA, whose selectors included Wood and Weber.

In the following month, on 16 April, SEFA assembled a French team to face Corinthians, which was welcomed to Paris by a reception committee that was made up of the most notable figures in French football at the time, including Wood, Weber, Gilon (SEFA), William Sleator (The White Rovers), Walter Hewson (Cook et Cie house), Philip Tomalin, Alfred Tunmer, Georges Duhamel, the Paris Committee of the USFSA, United SC, and the newspapers L'Auto and La Vie au grand air.

Two weeks later, on 1 May, Guérin's USFSA organized the first "official" match of France against Belgium, the so-called Évence Coppée Trophy, as part of the creation of FIFA, hence why Guérin did not allow neither SEFA nor Wood to intervene in this match; however, France's inaugural team included seven of the players who faced Corinthians in April, most of which had been selected by Weber and Wood, so even though Guérin chose the players without their help, he still validated some of their previous choices.

== Later life ==
Outside football, he was a lawyer. During the 1911 United Kingdom census, Wood was again in Devon, then married to an American wife, Evelyn, but the couple was childless and living on "private means".

== Death ==
At some point, Wood returned to France, where he died in Neuilly-sur-Seine on 10 October 1921, at the age of 48, as a widower remarried. (Note: Some sources wrongly claim that he died in Devon in 1930.)

== Honours ==
Robin Hood F.C.

- Middlesex Junior Cup:
  - Champions (1): 1893

White Rovers

- USFSA Football Championship:
  - Runner-up (1): 1894
