= Alfred Gindrat =

French footballer (1883-1951)

Personal information
- Full name: Alfred Justin Gindrat
- Date of birth: 29 October 1883
- Date of death: 26 January 1951 (aged 67)
- Position: Defender

International career
| Years | Team | Apps | (Gls) |
| 1911–1912 | France | 3 | (0) |

Alfred Gindrat (29 October 1883 – 26 January 1951) was a French footballer. He played in three matches for the France national football team from 1911 to 1912. He was also named in France's squad for the football tournament at the 1912 Summer Olympics, but the French side withdrew from the competition.
