= Sid Wood (footballer) =

English footballer

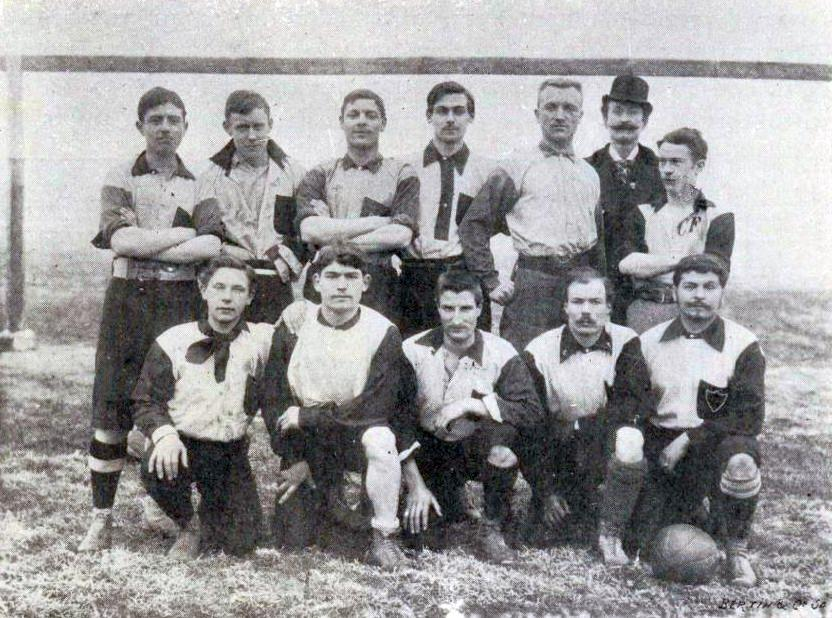
- Wood (seated, first from the left) in 1897

Personal information
- Full name: Frank Sidney Wood
- Date of birth: c. 1875
- Place of birth: Dalston, London Borough of Hackney, England
- Date of death: unknown
- Position: Defender

Senior career*
Years	Team	Apps	(Gls)
1894–1897	White Rovers		
1897–1899	Club Français		

International career
1898	Paris XI	1	(0)
- * Club domestic league appearances and goals

Frank Sidney Wood was an English footballer who played as a defender for White Rovers and Club Français.

== Early life ==
Frank Sidney Wood was born in Dalston, as the youngest of three brothers: Thomas William, born in Edmonton, and Jack, born in 1872 in Tottenham. In 1881 the family lived at 22, Tilson Road, still a mere four hundred yards from White Hart Lane.

== Playing career ==
=== The White Rovers ===
Shortly after arriving in Paris, his older brother Jack, together with other football pioneers in the city, mostly made up of a curious group of upper-middle-class Anglo-British, such as William Sleator, Walter Hewson, and Robert MacQueen, formed the White Rovers Football Club in a meeting at the Café Français on rue Pasquier in Paris, where they voted narrowly to play association football rather than rugby union rules, thus founding one of the first football club in Paris. Sid, who was either already in Paris or arrived with or soon after Jack, was one of the club's first players; however, several sources state that the name of Jack's brother was Tom; the result of a mistake that peristed through time, probably from a confusion with Robert MacQueen, who was the one with a brother named Thomas, who died during the First World War in 1917.

The White Rovers joined the USFSA in March 1894, and on 15 April of the same year, the club defeated CA Neuilly 13–0 in the quarter-finals of the inaugural USFSA championship, in which Sid Wood served as a linesman. Among his Rovers teammates in 1894, there were Ernest Cotton, Emile Cox, MacQueen, and his brother Jack, who was named team captain in October 1894. In July 1895, Sid Wood helped Rovers to a 2–1 win over Standard AC.

=== Club Français ===
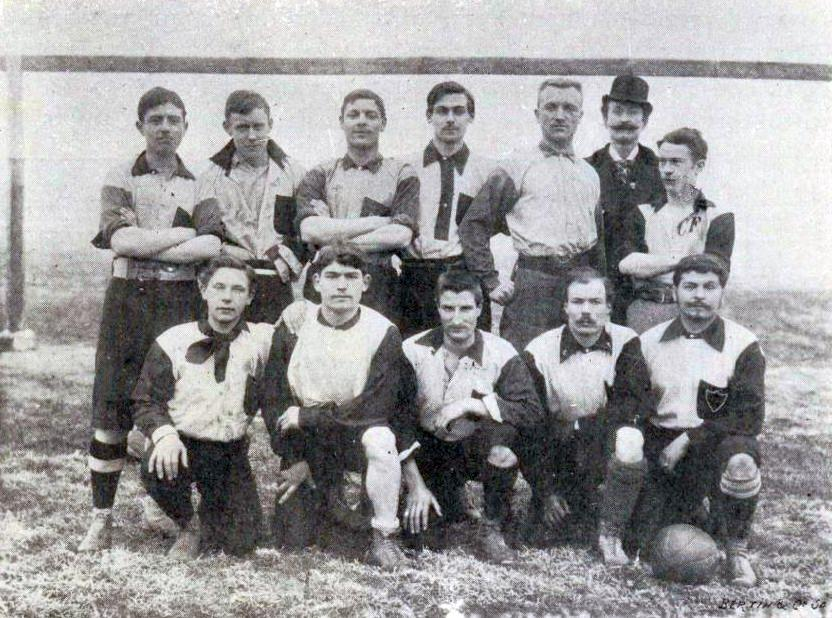
Wood (seated, first from the left) with Club Français at the Parc des Princes on 26 December 1897.

At some point in either 1896 or 1897, Sid Wood left Rovers to join Club Français, and likewise, on 26 December 1897, he started as a defender in the very first football match in the history of the Parc des Princes, which was refereed by his brother Jack as Club Français was defeated 1–3 by the English Ramblers. A few months later, on 28 March 1898, he started for Club Français in the 1898 Coupe Manier final at the Vélodrome de Vincennes, helping his side to keep a clean-sheet in a 10–0 win over Paris Star. In the following week, on 3 April, he started in the final of the 1898 USFSA Football Championship against Standard AC at Courbevoie, which ended in a 2–3 loss.

A few months later, on 13 December 1898, the Woods (Jack and Sid) were among the five players from Club Français who featured in a selection of the best Parisian players in a friendly match against a German national selection in front of 200 people; Paris lost 1–2.

== Honours ==
Club Français

- USFSA Football Championship:
  - Runner-up (1): 1898
- Coupe Manier:
  - Champions (1): 1898
