= 1904 USFSA Football Championship =

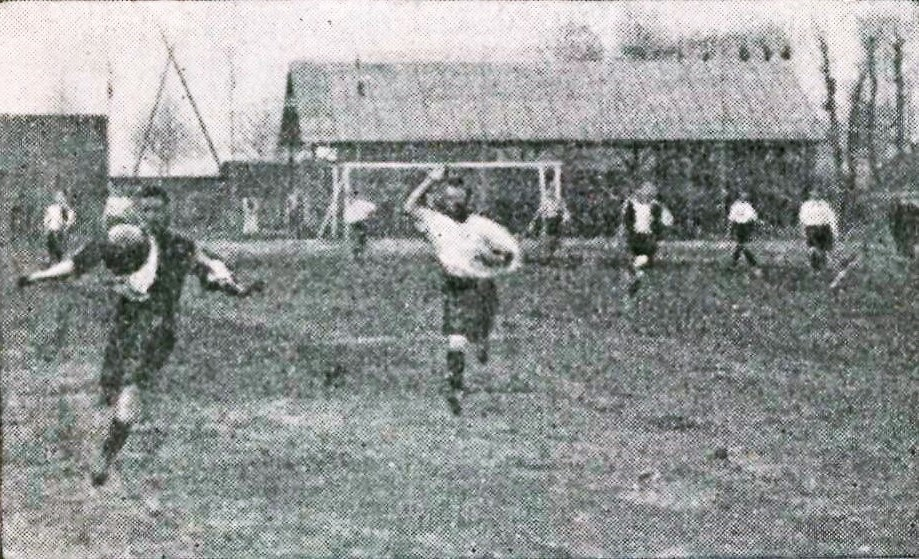

Statistics of the USFSA Football Championship in the 1904 season.

== Tournament ==
=== First round ===
- Amiens AC – RC Roubaix

=== Quarts de finale ===
- United Sports Club 8–0 Sport Athlétique Sézannais
- RC Roubaix – Club Sportif Havrais (Havre forfeited)
- Olympique de Marseille 2–2 Burdigala Bordeaux (match replayed)
- Stade rennais 1–0 Association Sportive des Étudiants de Caen
- Olympique de Marseille 2–0 Burdigalia Bordeaux

=== Semifinals ===
- RC Roubaix 12–1 Stade rennais
- United Sports Club 4–0 Olympique de Marseille

=== Final ===
- RC Roubaix 4–2 United Sports Club
