= 1898 USFSA Football Championship =

1898 Paris Football Championship

Tournament details
- Country: France
- Teams: 6

Final positions
- Champions: Standard Athletic Club (4th title)
- Runners-up: Club Français

The 1898 USFSA Football Championship was the 5th staging of the USFSA Football Championship.

It was played on neutral grounds, in a league system with Standard Athletic Club being proclaimed champions of France after beating Club Français 3–2 in a play-off title-decider, since they had finished level on 18 points.

== Table ==
| Pos | Team | Pld | W | D | L | GF | GA | GD | Pts | Qualification or relegation |
|---|---|---|---|---|---|---|---|---|---|---|
| 1 | Standard Athletic Club | 10 | 9 | 0 | 1 | 50 | 5 | +45 | 18 | Champion |
| 2 | Club Français | 10 | 9 | 0 | 1 | 27 | 6 | +21 | 18 | |
| 3 | United Sport Club | 10 | 5 | 1 | 4 | 10 | 22 | −12 | 11 | |
| 4 | Racing Club de France | 10 | 3 | 2 | 5 | 11 | 31 | −20 | 8 | |
| 5 | Paris Star | 10 | 2 | 1 | 7 | 3 | 37 | −34 | 5 | |
| 6 | The White Rovers (WD) (Note: The White Rovers withdrew) | 10 | 0 | 0 | 10 | 0 | 0 | 0 | 0 | |

Source: 1898 USFSA

== Play-off ==
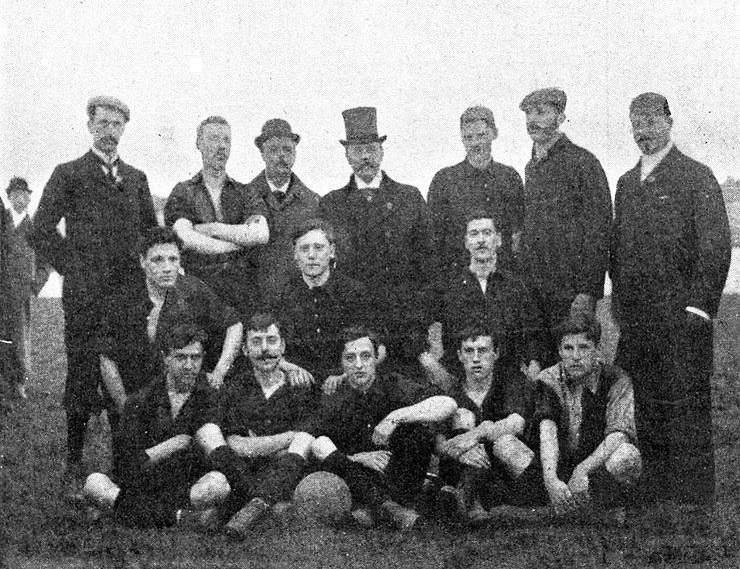
The Standard AC team on the day of the final

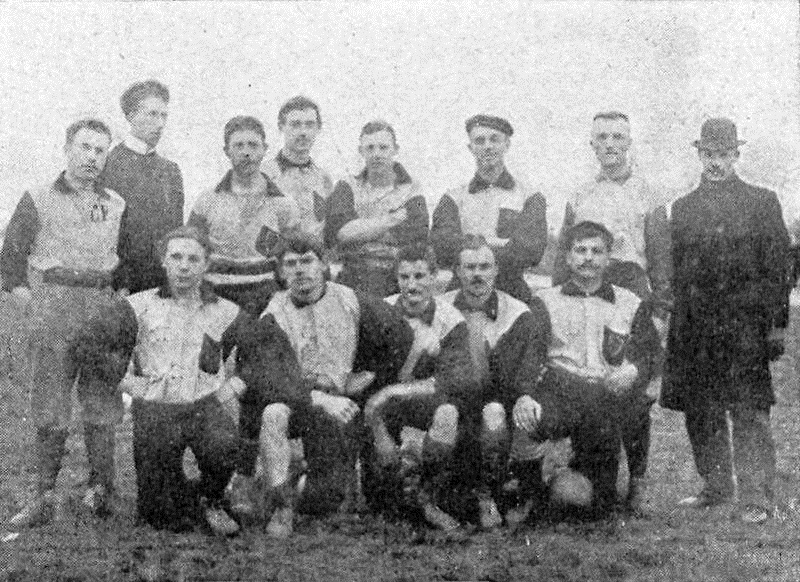
The Club Français team on the day of the final

Standard AC and Club Français competed head-to-head for the title and both teams finished tied on 18 points, which meant that the title had to be decided in a playoff match that was held on 3 April 1898 at the Vélodrome de Courbevoie, which Standard won 3–2, thus winning for the second year straight.

3 April 1898

| Standard AC | 3–2 | Club Français |
|---|---|---|
| | Report |

Courbevoie, France

== Winner ==
1898 USFSA Football Championship
Standard AC
