= US Suisse Paris =

- Full name: Union Sportive Suisse de Paris
- Founded: 1906
- Ground: Stade Mairie de Paris, Porte Dauphine
- Capacity: 5,000
- League: Ligue Île-de-France
- 2009–10: Promotion d'Honneur, 4th

Union Sportive Suisse de Paris, also known as simply US Suisse or Suisse Paris, is a French amateur football club based in Paris. The club was founded in 1906, as the result of a merger between United SC and Suisse Football Club. It currently plays in the Promotion d'Honneur of the Ligue Île-de-France, the ninth division of the French football league system.

== History ==
US Suisse Paris was founded in 1906, as the result of a merger between United SC and Suisse FC and, four years later, officially adopted the club's current name.

As stated in the name, the club is known for its relationship with the country of Switzerland. Suisse Paris regularly recruits players from the country, and many of the club's past presidents have been either Swiss-born or of Swiss heritage. The club is a founding member of the Ligue Île-de-France and the French Football Federation. Suisse Paris formerly played their home matches at the Stade Fernand Sastre in Saint-Maur-des-Fossés, named after the former FFF president, and currently host matches at the Stade Mairie de Paris in Porte Dauphine not far from Paris Dauphine University.

== Honours ==
- Founding member of the Ligue Île-de-France and the French Football Federation
