= List of French football champions =

- Founded: 1893–94
- Country: France (17 teams); Monaco (1 team)
- Confederation: UEFA
- Number of clubs: 18
- Current champions: Paris Saint-Germain (14th title) (2025–26)
- Most championships: Paris Saint-Germain (14 titles)
- Current: 2026-27 Ligue 1

The French football champions are the winners of the highest league of football in France, Ligue 1. Since the National Council of the French Football Federation voted in support of professionalism in French football in 1930, the professional football championship of France has been contested through Ligue 1, formerly known as Division 1 from 1933 to 2002.

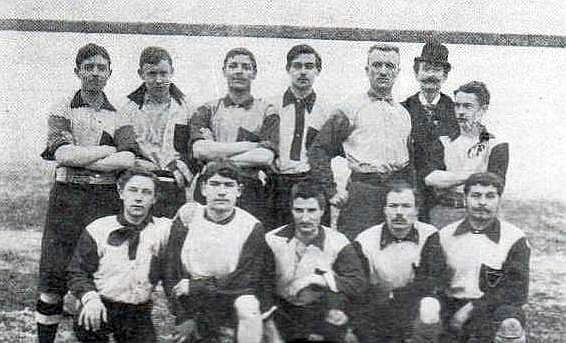
1895–96 champions Club Français, pictured here in 1898

Prior to this, the first division championship of French football was contested through a league run by the Union des Sociétés Françaises de Sports Athlétiques (USFSA), an organization that supported amateur sport. The USFSA's league run from 1894 to 1919 and awarded 22 league titles before being suspended in 1915 due to World War I and the creation and success of the Coupe de France, which had quickly become the country's national competition.

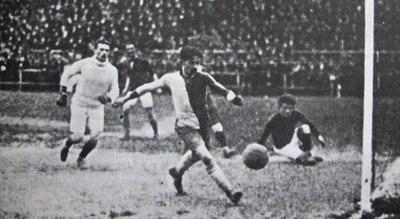
1918–19 champions Le Havre, pictured playing against CA Paris in 1920

The USFSA returned in 1919 changing the league into numerous regional amateur leagues that awarded no league title. This system lasted from 1919 to 1926. In 1926, the first division's reins were handed over to the French Football Federation. The federation organized and ran a league composed of the regional amateur league champions called the Championnat de France amateur from 1927 to 1929 and awarded three titles before the league was converted to the professional league that exists today in 1932.

The first champions of French football were Standard Athletic Club, who defeated The White Rovers 2–0 in Courbevoie on 6 May 1894. The initial championship match was held on 29 April but finished 2–2, so the match was replayed. Standard went on to win the French championship four more times over the next seven years before RC Roubaix took control of the league becoming the first French club to win three straight titles beginning in 1902. Following Roubaix's success, the ownership of the amateur league title began rotating back and forth from the north of France to the south of France with Marseille eventually winning the last amateur title in 1929.

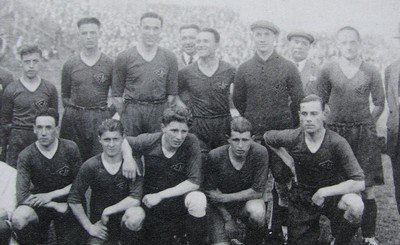
1926–27 champions CA Paris, pictured at the end of the following season

The first French football champions of the professional era were Olympique Lillois, a predecessor of Lille, who defeated Cannes 4–3 on 14 May 1933 at the Stade Olympique Yves-du-Manoir in Colombes. Sète were crowned champions the following season and, in 1939, became the first professional club in France to win two titles. Following the conclusion of World War II, Saint-Étienne became the model club of the country winning four consecutive titles from 1966 to 1970. The club won all its 10 titles in a span of 25 years. Marseille repeated Saint-Étienne's feat of four consecutive titles from 1988 to 1992. It would take the club another 17 years to win another title. During the hiatus between Marseille's title in 1992 and the club's most recent in 2010, Lyon established themselves as a top club winning their first title in 2002. The title started a national record-breaking streak of seven successive league championships with the streak coming to an end following the 2008–09 season when Bordeaux eclipsed them winning their sixth title.

Paris Saint-Germain have the most titles in French football, with 14, followed by Saint-Étienne and Marseille, with 10 each. The majority of Saint-Étienne's titles came during the 1960s and 1970s when the club was led by managers Jean Snella, Albert Batteux, and Robert Herbin. Marseille has nine professional league titles and one amateur title which they won in the 1928–29 season. The club initially equalled Saint-Étienne's number of titles won during the 1992–93 season, but the title was stripped after it was discovered by the Ligue de Football Professionnel (LFP) that the club's president Bernard Tapie had bribed the opposition's players. Tapie was later found guilty of bribery and sentenced to two years in prison. In the 2009–10 season, Marseille equalled Saint-Étienne's number of titles, amateur or professional. Paris Saint-Germain won 12 of their 14 titles in a 14-year span from 2013 to 2026. Nantes and Monaco are fourth with eight titles each, while Lyon has seven.

== List of champions ==
†	Winning team also won Coupe de France in the same season, winning a domestic Double.
†	Winning team also won UEFA Champions League in the same season, winning a continental Double.
§	Winning team also won Coupe de France and Coupe de la Ligue in the same season, winning a domestic Treble
#	Winning team also won UEFA Champions League and Coupe de France in the same season, winning a continental Treble.

Ed.	Season	Winners	Runners-up	Third place
Amateur era (1893–1929)
1	1893–94	Standard Athletic Club (1)	The White Rovers	N/A
2	1894–95	Standard Athletic Club (2)	The White Rovers	N/A
3	1895–96	Club Français (1)	The White Rovers	N/A
4	1896–97	Standard Athletic Club (3)	The White Rovers	N/A
5	1897–98	Standard Athletic Club (4)	Club Français	N/A
6	1898–99	Le Havre (1)	Club Français	N/A
7	1899–1900	Le Havre (2)	Club Français	N/A
8	1900–01	Standard Athletic Club (5)	Le Havre	N/A
9	1901–02	Roubaix (1)	RC Paris	N/A
10	1902–03	Roubaix (2)	RC Paris	N/A
11	1903–04	Roubaix (3)	Suisse Paris	N/A
12	1904–05	Gallia Club Paris (1)	Roubaix	N/A
13	1905–06	Roubaix (4)	CA Paris	N/A
14	1906–07	RC Paris (1)	Roubaix	N/A
15	1907–08	Roubaix (5)	RC Paris	N/A
16	1908–09	Stade Helvétique (1)	CA Paris	N/A
17	1909–10	US Tourcoing (1)	Stade Helvétique	N/A
18	1910–11	Stade Helvétique (2)	RC Paris	N/A
19	1911–12	Saint-Raphaël (1)	AS Française	N/A
20	1912–13	Stade Helvétique (3)	Rouen	N/A
21	1913–14	Olympique Lillois (1)	Sète	N/A
–	1914–18	Suspended due to World War I		
22	1918–19	Le Havre (3)	Marseille	N/A
–	1919–26	Not Played		
23	1926–27	CA Paris (1)	Amiens AC	Marseille
24	1927–28	Stade Français (1) (Note: For the 1927–28 and 1928–29 seasons, the French Football Federation eliminated the league table format used in the previous season and used a playoff system. No third-place match was held.)	US Tourcoing	N/A
25	1928–29	Marseille (1) (Note: For the 1927–28 and 1928–29 seasons, the French Football Federation eliminated the league table format used in the previous season and used a playoff system. No third-place match was held.)	Club Français	N/A
–	1929–32	Not Played		
Professional era (1932–present)
26	1932–33	Olympique Lillois (2)	Cannes	RC Paris
27	1933–34	Sète (1)	Fives	Marseille
28	1934–35	Sochaux (1)	Strasbourg	RC Paris
29	1935–36	RC Paris (2)	Olympique Lillois	Strasbourg
30	1936–37	Marseille (2)	Sochaux	RC Paris
31	1937–38	Sochaux (2)	Marseille	Sète
32	1938–39	Sète (2)	Marseille	RC Paris
–	1939–45	Suspended due to World War II		
33	1945–46	Lille (1)	Saint-Étienne	CO Roubaix-Tourcoing
34	1946–47	Roubaix–Tourcoing (1)	Reims	Strasbourg
35	1947–48	Marseille (3)	Lille	Reims
36	1948–49	Reims (1)	Lille	Marseille
37	1949–50	Bordeaux (1)	Lille	Reims
38	1950–51	Nice (1)	Lille	Le Havre
39	1951–52	Nice (2)	Bordeaux	Lille
40	1952–53	Reims (2)	Sochaux	Bordeaux
41	1953–54	Lille (2)	Reims	Bordeaux
42	1954–55	Reims (3)	Toulouse (1937)	Lens
43	1955–56	Nice (3)	Lens	Monaco
44	1956–57	Saint-Étienne (1)	Lens	Reims
45	1957–58	Reims (4)	Nîmes	Monaco
46	1958–59	Nice (4)	Nîmes	RC Paris
47	1959–60	Reims (5)	Nîmes	RC Paris
48	1960–61	Monaco (1)	RC Paris	Reims
49	1961–62	Reims (6)	RC Paris	Nîmes
50	1962–63	Monaco (2)	Reims	Sedan
51	1963–64	Saint-Étienne (2)	Monaco	RC Lens
52	1964–65	Nantes (1)	Bordeaux	Valenciennes
53	1965–66	Nantes (2)	Bordeaux	Valenciennes
54	1966–67	Saint-Étienne (3)	Nantes	Angers
55	1967–68	Saint-Étienne (4)	Nice	Sochaux
56	1968–69	Saint-Étienne (5)	Bordeaux	Metz
57	1969–70	Saint-Étienne (6)	Marseille	RC Paris-Sedan
58	1970–71	Marseille (4)	Saint-Étienne	Nantes
59	1971–72	Marseille (5)	Nîmes	Sochaux
60	1972–73	Nantes (3)	Nice	Marseille
61	1973–74	Saint-Étienne (7)	Nantes	Lyon
62	1974–75	Saint-Étienne (8)	Marseille	Lyon
63	1975–76	Saint-Étienne (9)	Nice	Sochaux
64	1976–77	Nantes (4)	Lens	Bastia
65	1977–78	Monaco (3)	Nantes	Strasbourg
66	1978–79	Strasbourg	Nantes	Saint-Étienne
67	1979–80	Nantes (5)	Sochaux	Saint-Étienne
68	1980–81	Saint-Étienne (10)	Nantes	Bordeaux
69	1981–82	Monaco (4)	Saint-Étienne	Sochaux
70	1982–83	Nantes (6)	Bordeaux	Paris Saint-Germain
71	1983–84	Bordeaux (2)	Monaco	Auxerre
72	1984–85	Bordeaux (3)	Nantes	Monaco
73	1985–86	Paris Saint-Germain (1)	Nantes	Bordeaux
74	1986–87	Bordeaux (4)	Marseille	Toulouse
75	1987–88	Monaco (5)	Bordeaux	Montpellier
76	1988–89	Marseille (6)	Paris Saint-Germain	Monaco
77	1989–90	Marseille (7)	Bordeaux	Monaco
78	1990–91	Marseille (8)	Monaco	Auxerre
79	1991–92	Marseille (9)	Monaco	Paris Saint-Germain
80	1992–93	— (Note: Marseille were stripped of their title by the LFP after being found guilty of bribery. No winner was declared for that season.)	Paris Saint-Germain	Monaco
81	1993–94	Paris Saint-Germain (2)	Marseille	Auxerre
82	1994–95	Nantes (7)	Lyon	Paris Saint-Germain
83	1995–96	Auxerre (1)	Paris Saint-Germain	Monaco
84	1996–97	Monaco (6)	Paris Saint-Germain	Nantes
85	1997–98	Lens (1)	Metz	Monaco
86	1998–99	Bordeaux (5)	Marseille	Lyon
87	1999–2000	Monaco (7)	Paris Saint-Germain	Lyon
88	2000–01	Nantes (8)	Lyon	Lille
89	2001–02	Lyon (1)	Lens	Auxerre
90	2002–03	Lyon (2)	Monaco	Marseille
91	2003–04	Lyon (3)	Paris Saint-Germain	Monaco
92	2004–05	Lyon (4)	Lille	Monaco
93	2005–06	Lyon (5)	Bordeaux	Lille
94	2006–07	Lyon (6)	Marseille	Toulouse
95	2007–08	Lyon (7)	Bordeaux	Marseille
96	2008–09	Bordeaux (6)	Marseille	Lyon
97	2009–10	Marseille (10)	Lyon	Auxerre
98	2010–11	Lille (3)	Marseille	Lyon
99	2011–12	Montpellier (1)	Paris Saint-Germain	Lille
100	2012–13	Paris Saint-Germain (3)	Marseille	Lyon
101	2013–14	Paris Saint-Germain (4)	Monaco	Lille
102	2014–15	Paris Saint-Germain (5)	Lyon	Monaco
103	2015–16	Paris Saint-Germain (6)	Lyon	Monaco
104	2016–17	Monaco (8)	Paris Saint-Germain	Nice
105	2017–18	Paris Saint-Germain (7)	Monaco	Lyon
106	2018–19	Paris Saint-Germain (8)	Lille	Lyon
107	2019–20	Paris Saint-Germain (9) (Note: 2019–20 Ligue 1 suspended in March 2020 due to the COVID-19 pandemic in France; season curtailed and final standings (including PSG as champions) declared by a points-per-game ratio on 30 April 2020.)	Marseille	Rennes
108	2020–21	Lille (4)	Paris Saint-Germain	Monaco
109	2021–22	Paris Saint-Germain (10)	Marseille	Monaco
110	2022–23	Paris Saint-Germain (11)	Lens	Marseille
111	2023–24	Paris Saint-Germain (12)	Monaco	Brest
112	2024–25	Paris Saint-Germain (13)	Marseille	Monaco
113	2025–26	Paris Saint-Germain (14)	Lens	Lille

== Performance ==
=== Performance by club in amateur era and professional era ===
Rank	Club	Winners	Runners-up	Winning seasons	Runner-up seasons
1	**Paris Saint-Germain**	14	9	1985–86, 1993–94, 2012–13, 2013–14, 2014–15, 2015–16, 2017–18, 2018–19, 2019–20, 2021–22, 2022–23, 2023–24, 2024–25, 2025–26	1988–89, 1992–93, 1995–96, 1996–97, 1999–2000, 2003–04, 2011–12, 2016–17, 2020–21
2	**Marseille**	10	15	1928–29, 1936–37, 1947–48, 1970–71, 1971–72, 1988–89, 1989–90, 1990–91, 1991–92, 2009–10	1918–19, 1937–38, 1938–39, 1969–70, 1974–75, 1986–87, 1993–94, 1998–99, 2006–07, 2008–09, 2010–11, 2012–13, 2019–20, 2021–22, 2024–25
2	Saint-Étienne	10	3	1956–57, 1963–64, 1966–67, 1967–68, 1968–69, 1969–70, 1973–74, 1974–75, 1975–76, 1980–81	1945–46, 1970–71, 1981–82
4	**Monaco**	8	8	1960–61, 1962–63, 1977–78, 1981–82, 1987–88, 1996–97, 1999–2000, 2016–17	1963–64, 1983–84, 1990–91, 1991–92, 2002–03, 2013–14, 2017–18, 2023–24
4	Nantes	8	7	1964–65, 1965–66, 1972–73, 1976–77, 1979–80, 1982–83, 1994–95, 2000–01	1966–67, 1973–74, 1977–78, 1978–79, 1980–81, 1984–85, 1985–86
6	**Lyon**	7	5	2001–02, 2002–03, 2003–04, 2004–05, 2005–06, 2006–07, 2007–08	1994–95, 2000–01, 2009–10, 2014–15, 2015–16
7	Bordeaux	6	9	1949–50, 1983–84, 1984–85, 1986–87, 1998–99, 2008–09	1951–52, 1964–65, 1965–66, 1968–69, 1982–83, 1987–88, 1989–90, 2005–06, 2007–08
7	**Lille**	6	7	1913–14, 1932–33, 1945–46, 1953–54, 2010–11, 2020–21	1935–36, 1947–48, 1948–49, 1949–50, 1950–51, 2004–05, 2018–19
7	Reims	6	3	1948–49, 1952–53, 1954–55, 1957–58, 1959–60, 1961–62	1946–47, 1953–54, 1962–63
11	Standard Athletic Club	5	—	1893–94, 1894–95, 1896–97, 1897–98, 1900–01	
11	RC Roubaix	5	2	1901–02, 1902–03, 1903–04, 1905–06, 1907–08	1904–05, 1906–07
12	**Nice**	4	3	1950–51, 1951–52, 1955–56, 1958–59	1967–68, 1972–73, 1975–76
13	Stade Helvétique	3	1	1908–09, 1910–11, 1912–13	1909–10
13	**Le Havre**	3	1	1898–99, 1899–1900, 1918–19	1900–01
15	RC Paris	2	6	1906–07, 1935–36	1901–02, 1902–03, 1907–08, 1910–11, 1960–61, 1961–62
15	Sochaux	2	3	1934–35, 1937–38	1936–37, 1952–53, 1979–80
15	Sète	2	1	1933–34, 1938–39	1913–14
18	**Lens**	1	6	1997–98	1955–56, 1956–57, 1976–77, 2001–02, 2022–23, 2025–26
18	Club Français	1	4	1895–96	1897–98, 1898–99, 1899–1900, 1928–29
18	Paris-Charenton	1	2	1926–27	1905–06, 1908–09
18	US Tourcoing	1	1	1909–10	1927–28
18	Rouen	1	1	1944–45	1912–13
18	**Strasbourg**	1	1	1978–79	1934–35
18	Gallia Club Paris	1	—	1904–05	
18	Saint-Raphaël	1	—	1911–12	
18	Stade Français	1	—	1927–28	
18	**Auxerre**	1	—	1995–96	
18	Montpellier	1	—	2011–12	
18	Roubaix TC	1	—	1946–47	
N/A	The White Rovers	–	4		1893–94, 1894–95, 1895–96, 1896–97
N/A	Nîmes	–	4		1957–58, 1958–59, 1959–60, 1971–72
N/A	Suisse Paris	–	1		1903–04
N/A	AS Française	–	1		1911–12
N/A	Amiens	–	1		1926–27
N/A	Cannes	–	1		1932–33
N/A	Fives	–	1		1933–34
N/A	Toulouse (1937)	–	1		1954–55
N/A	Metz	–	1		1997–98

Notes:

- **Bold** indicates clubs currently playing in Ligue 1.
- Lille OSC is the legal heir of Olympique Lillois.
- Toulouse FC is not the successor to Toulouse FC (1937).

=== Performance by club in professional era ===
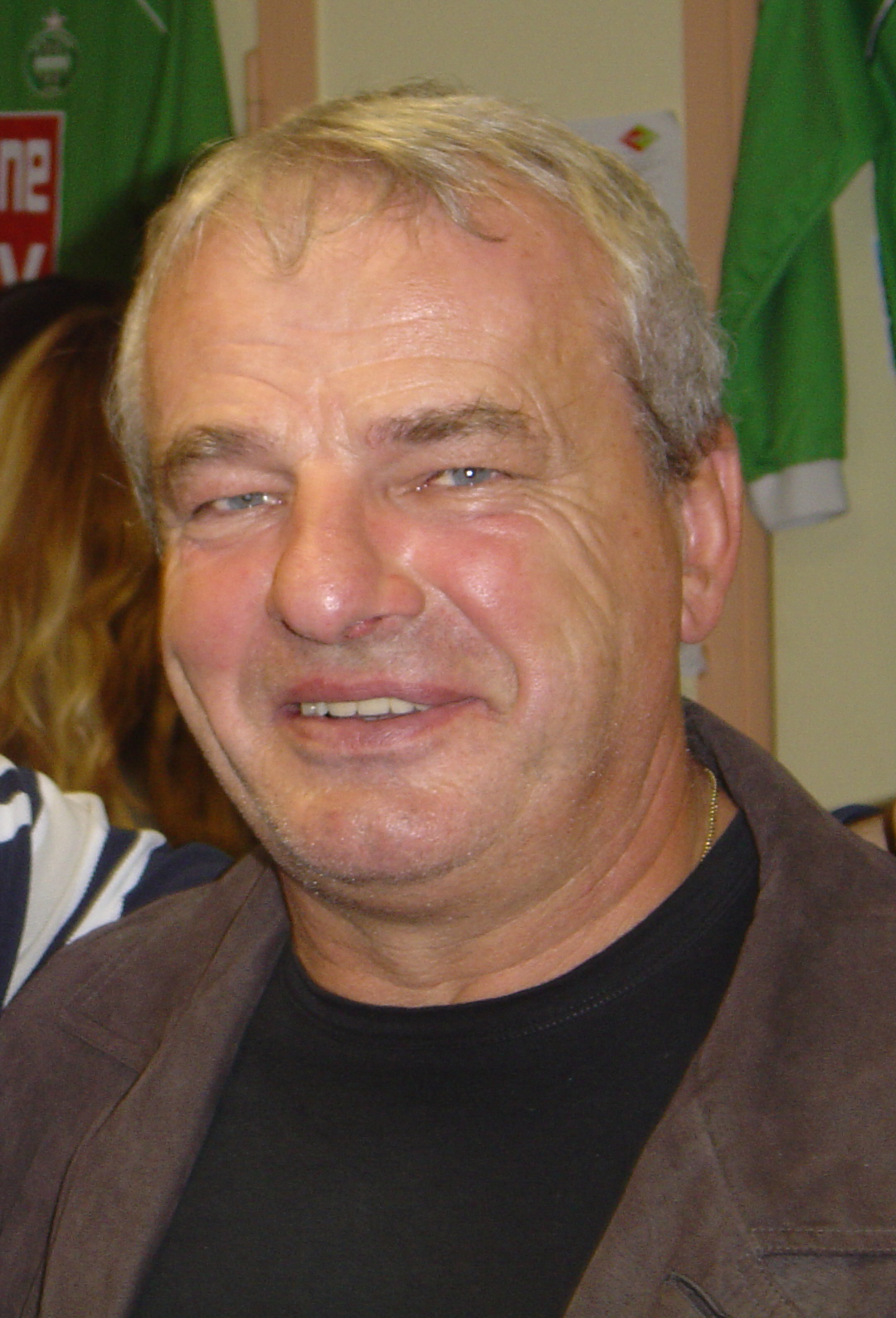
Georges Bereta won six league titles while playing for Saint-Étienne.

Club	Winners	Runners-up	Winning seasons
**Paris Saint-Germain**	14	9	1985–86, 1993–94, 2012–13, 2013–14, 2014–15, 2015–16, 2017–18, 2018–19, 2019–20, 2021–22, 2022–23, 2023–24, 2024–25, 2025–26
Saint-Étienne	10	3	1956–57, 1963–64, 1966–67, 1967–68, 1968–69, 1969–70, 1973–74, 1974–75, 1975–76, 1980–81
**Marseille**	9	14	1936–37, 1947–48, 1970–71, 1971–72, 1988–89, 1989–90, 1990–91, 1991–92, 2009–10
**Monaco**	8	8	1960–61, 1962–63, 1977–78, 1981–82, 1987–88, 1996–97, 1999–2000, 2016–17
Nantes	8	7	1964–65, 1965–66, 1972–73, 1976–77, 1979–80, 1982–83, 1994–95, 2000–01
**Lyon**	7	5	2001–02, 2002–03, 2003–04, 2004–05, 2005–06, 2006–07, 2007–08
Bordeaux	6	9	1949–50, 1983–84, 1984–85, 1986–87, 1998–99, 2008–09
Reims	6	3	1948–49, 1952–53, 1954–55, 1957–58, 1959–60, 1961–62
**Lille**	5	7	1932–33, 1945–46, 1953–54, 2010–11, 2020–21
**Nice**	4	3	1950–51, 1951–52, 1955–56, 1958–59
Sochaux	2	3	1934–35, 1937–38
Sète	2	–	1933–34, 1938–39
**Lens**	1	6	1997–98
RC Paris	1	2	1935–36
**Strasbourg**	1	1	1978–79
Roubaix-Tourcoing	1	–	1946–47
**Auxerre**	1	–	1995–96
Montpellier	1	–	2011–12
Nîmes	–	4	–
Cannes	–	1	–
Fives	–	1	–
Toulouse (1937)	–	1	–
Metz	–	1	–

Notes:

- Clubs in **bold** are competing in 2025–26 Ligue 1.
- Marseille were stripped of their title by the LFP after being found guilty of bribery in 1992–93 French Division 1. No winner was declared for that season.

=== Performance by club in amateur era ===
Club	Winners	Runners-up	Winning seasons
Roubaix	5	2	1901–02, 1902–03, 1903–04, 1905–06, 1907–08
Standard Athletic Club	5	–	1893–94, 1894–95, 1896–97, 1897–98, 1900–01
Stade Helvétique	3	1	1908–09, 1910–11, 1912–13
Le Havre	3	1	1898–99, 1899–1900, 1918–19
Club Français	1	4	1895–96
RC Paris	1	4	1906–07
CA Paris	1	2	1926–27
US Tourcoing	1	1	1909–10
Marseille	1	1	1928–29
Gallia Club Paris	1	–	1904–05
Saint-Raphaël	1	–	1911–12
Olympique Lillois	1	–	1913–14
Stade Français	1	–	1927–28
The White Rovers	–	4	–
Suisse Paris	–	1	–
AS Française	–	1	–
Rouen	–	1	–
Sète	–	1	–
Amiens	–	1	–

Notes:

- RC Paris, Marseille and Olympique Lillois are the only teams who managed to win in **Amateur era** and also in **Professional era**.
