= Georges Caizac =

French footballer

Personal information
- Place of birth: France
- Position: Forward

Senior career*
Years	Team	Apps	(Gls)
1893	Etoile Sportive; Parisiennne		
1893–1894	CA Neuilly		
- * Club domestic league appearances and goals

Georges Caizac was a French footballer, referee, and sports journalist.

== Sporting career ==
=== Early years ===
According to French football historian Georges Duhamel, the likes of Caizac, Georges Garnier, Lucien Huteau, and Fernand Canelle, were members of the small group of middle school students from the Parisian Lycée Chaptal who, in early 1893, founded a club called created Etoile Sportive Parisiennne, one of the first football clubs in the French capital, which set up on the pitch at the Château de Madrid in the Bois de Boulogne. At the end of the 1892–93 season, the Parisian members of the Étoile moved to Club Français, while those of Neuilly-sur-Seine, Puteaux, and Courbevoie came together in a new club first named Les Jeunes Athlètes, and then Cercle athlétique de Neuilly, which was subsequently declared an association, with Caizac being elected the club's first secretary, as well as captain of its football team, sharing the latter honour with Léon Augis.

CA Neuilly joined the USFSA in March 1894, and on 15 April of the same year, Caizac was Neuilly's captain in the quarter-finals of the inaugural USFSA championship, which ended in a 13–0 loss to The White Rovers. In the French newspaper Les Sports athlétiques, Caizac gave a summary of the match that he himself played as the captain of Neuilly, stating that his side did not field all of its regular players, as several members of the first team did not deign to travel because of the rain, so they were replaced by members of the second team, and after conceding six goals in the first half, most of the Neuilly players stopped playing in the second. A week later, on 22 April, he refereed the semifinal between White Rovers and Club Français, which ended in a 1–0 win to the former.

At the start of the 1894–95 season, Neuilly notably met Standard AC on three consecutive Sundays on the pitch of the Seine Velodrome, conceding between 12 and 23 goals each time. Neuilly's main players at the time were Caizac, Duhamel, the Gaston brothers, and the Scot Howatson, who played under the name of Stevens because his father forbade him to play on Sundays, the Lord's Day. In October 1894, a commission dedicated to football was created within the USFSA, which included a player from Neuilly, Caizac, and at the same time, the Union's Council appointed official referees for one year in January 1895, among whom were three players from Neuilly, Caizac, Duhamel, and Chapelle. Two months later, in March, Neuilly was one of the eight teams that contested the 1895 USFSA Championship, beating CP Asnières 2–1 in the quarter-finals after extra-time; however, the Asnières club complained to the USFSA commission, stating that the winning goal had been scored "due to darkness", but Caizac, Neuilly's secretary and member of that commission, intervened in favour of his club and the result was thus confirmed. In his book, Caizac's Neuilly teammate Duhamel admitted that it was a "scheme and favoritism".

Neuilly not having a designated field led to the club's dissolution since the players wanted to join clubs that had one, and while Duhamel joined Paris Star, which played on the Reuilly pitch in the Bois de Vincennes, eventually becoming its president, Caizac decided to retire from playing.

=== Later career ===
In 1897, Caizac became the editor of the football section of the official journal of the USFSA, and eventually, he not only became an editor of the newspaper Le Vélo, but also the driving force behind the FSAPF, which was a federation for "professionals", thus opposing the ideals of amateurism of the USFSA. This federation was opened to several sports, and likewise, on 2 March 1901, Caizac refereed a FSAPF Cross country running competition. As preparation for France's inaugural match in 1904, both the USFSA and the FSAPF assembled a French team to face Southampton in March 1904, with Caizac selecting the latter and then stating in Le Vélo that "the professional team will not be inferior in value to the amateur team"; however, the FSAPF team lost 0–11 against the USFSA's 1–6 loss.

In May 1909, Caizac interviewed the Negro American cyclist Major Taylor on his recent victory at the Parc de Princes. The following year, on 27 August 1910, he was one of the founding members of the Ligue de Football Association (LFA), alongside CA Paris' president Michel Fontaine, and Red Star's president Jules Rimet.

== Bibliography ==
- Duhamel, Georges (1959). Le football français: ses débuts [French football: its beginnings] (in French). Paris: Imprimerie de la Charente. p. 80.
