= Georges Duhamel (footballer) =

French footballer

Personal information
- Date of birth: 1879
- Place of birth: France
- Position: Defender

Senior career*
Years	Team	Apps	(Gls)
1893	Etoile Sportive; Parisiennne		
1893–1894	CA Neuilly		
- * Club domestic league appearances and goals

Georges Duhamel (1879 – unknown) was a French footballer who played as a defender for CA Neuilly in the mid-1890s.

In 1931, he published a book that recounts in detail the beginnings of football in France entitled Le Football français, ses débuts, which remains one of the most important and insightful testimonies of this period because, on some occasions, this book is its only source of reference.

== Sporting career ==
=== Early years ===
Born in 1879, Duhamel was introduced to football by his older brother (several years his senior), who allowed him to join his network of friends made up of students from the Lycée Jean-Baptiste-Say who, in April 1892, organized meetings to play football in the Bois de Boulogne in the 16th arrondissement of Paris. Together with Georges Caizac, Georges Garnier, and Lucien Huteau, he was a member of the small group of middle school students from the Parisian Lycée Chaptal who, in early 1893, founded a club called created Etoile Sportive Parisiennne, one of the first football clubs in the French capital, which set up on the pitch at the Château de Madrid in the Bois de Boulogne. At the end of the 1892–93 season, the Parisian members of the Étoile moved to Club Français, while those of Neuilly-sur-Seine, Puteaux, and Courbevoie came together in a new club first named Les Jeunes Athlètes, and then Cercle athlétique de Neuilly, which was subsequently declared an association.

=== CA Neuilly ===
CA Neuilly joined the USFSA in March 1894, and on 15 April of the same year, his older brother started as a defender in the first official match in the history of French football, the quarter-finals of the inaugural USFSA championship, which ended in a 13–0 loss to The White Rovers. The 15-year-old Duhamel was unable to provide an account of this match in his book, having flu and having been forbidden to go out by his mother.

At the start of the 1894–95 season, Neuilly notably met Standard AC on three consecutive Sundays on the pitch of the Seine Velodrome, conceding between 12 and 23 goals each time. Neuilly's main players at the time were Duhamel, Caizac, the Gaston brothers, and the Scot Howatson, who played under the name of Stevens because his father forbade him to play on Sundays, the Lord's Day. In October 1894, the USFSA's Council appointed official referees for one year in January 1895, among whom were three players from Neuilly, Duhamel, Caizac, and Chapelle. Two months later, in March, Neuilly was one of the eight teams that contested the 1895 USFSA Championship, beating CP Asnières 2–1 in the quarter-finals after extra-time; however, the Asnières club complained to the USFSA commission, stating that the winning goal had been scored "due to darkness", but Caizac, Neuilly's secretary and member of that commission, intervened in favour of his club and the result was thus confirmed. In his book, Duhamel admitted that it was a "scheme and favoritism".

CA Neuilly ceased its activity in 1896, after only three years of existence, and the club's history is mainly known thanks to Duhamel's book, one of its players. Duhamel did not give an explicit reason for the club's dissolution, but Neuilly not having a designated field probably weighed in the players' decision to join clubs that had one, with Duhamel, in particular, joining Paris Star, which played on the Reuilly pitch in the Bois de Vincennes.

=== Paris Star ===
On 4 April 1897, Duhamel started for Paris Star as a midfielder in the semifinals of the inaugural edition of the Coupe Manier, which ended in an 8–1 loss to the eventual champions Club Français. In the following year, on 28 March, he started in the final of the 1898 Coupe Manier at the Vélodrome de Vincennes, which ended in another resounding loss (10–0) to Club Français. At some point at the turn of the century, Duhamel became the president of Paris Star, replacing Manier, who had established Coupe Manier, and thus, in February 1903, he was the representative of Paris Star in the USFSA's football commission. Paris Star went on to be one of the founding members of Ligue de Football Association in 1910, and of the LFA's 14 members active between 1910 and 1919, only Duhamel was a member of the USFSA's football association committee in 1903.

On 16 April 1904, Duhamel, along with the likes of Philip Tomalin, Alfred Tunmer, Ernest Weber, and Jack Wood, were members of the reception committee that welcomed Corinthians to Paris ahead of its match against a French national team.

== Writing career ==
In 1931, Duhamel published a book that recounts in detail the beginnings of football in France entitled Le Football français, ses débuts, which remains one of the most important and insightful testimonies of this period because, on some occasions, this book is its only source of reference. The book had a preface by Pierre Pochonet and had at least three editions.

In the 1930s, the manager of Arsenal Herbert Chapman is said to have introduced the WM formation, but in November 1935, Duhamel questioned Chapman's paternity in an article published in Le Matin, stating that "the W system does not date from the moment when, in 1932, Arsenal applied it with all its beauty. In 1925, the same year that the two-man offside was introduced, the Scottish League teams immediately used the W formation and even WM". In this article, he was described as "a veteran of football in France and who knows the history of football better than all those who are currently championing the W system".

== Works ==
- Le Football français, ses débuts (1931)

== Bibliography ==
- Duhamel, Georges (1959). Le football français: ses débuts [French football: its beginnings] (in French). Paris: Imprimerie de la Charente. p. 80.
