= Adam Ferris =

Scottish footballer

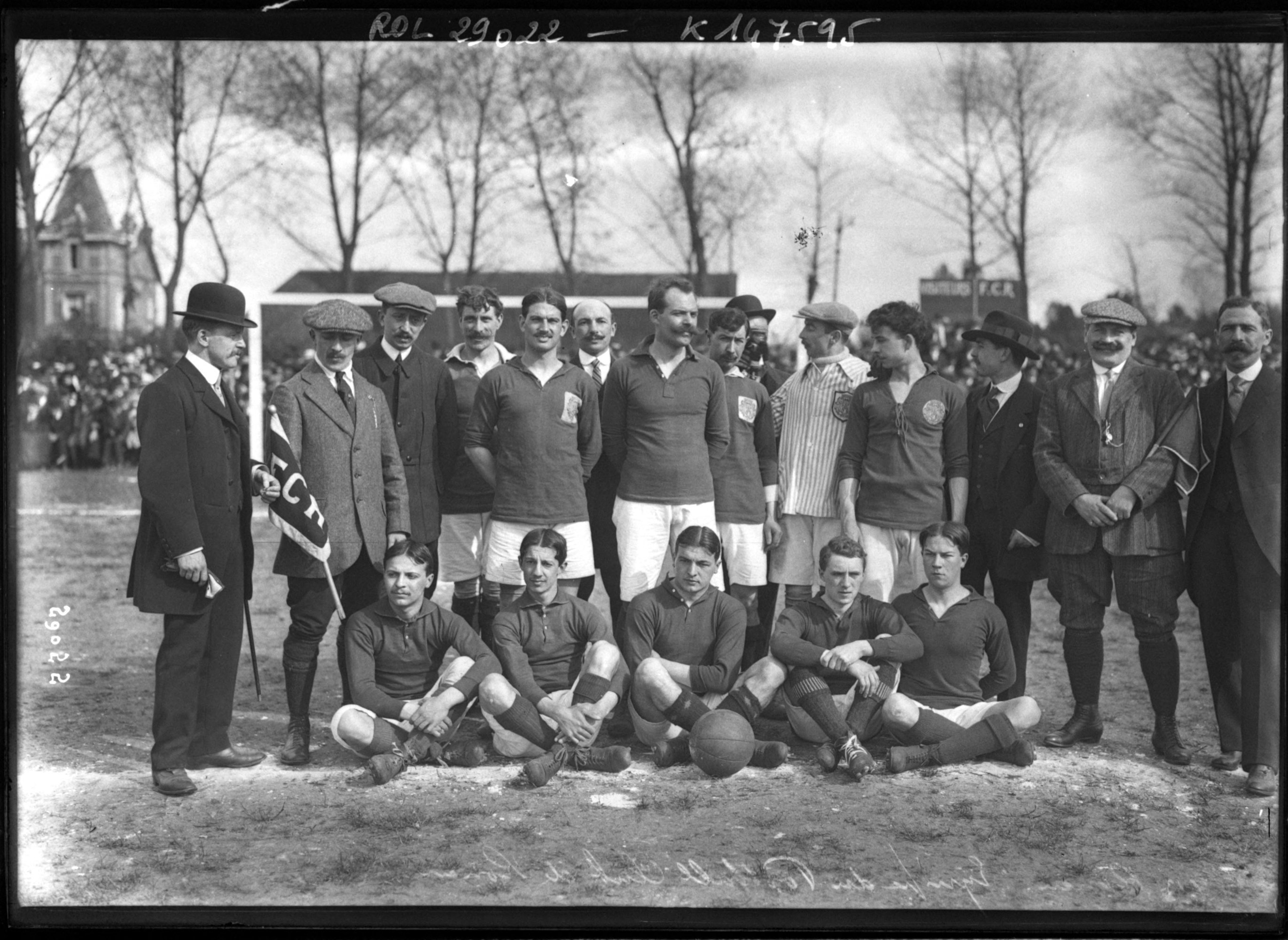
- Ferris (captain, 4th from the left) in 1913

Personal information
- Place of birth: France
- Position: Defender

Senior career*
Years	Team	Apps	(Gls)
1898–1902	Standard AC		
1902–1915	Rouen		
- * Club domestic league appearances and goals

Adam Ferris was a Scottish football player who played as a defender for Standard AC and Rouen at the turn of the 20th century.

== Career ==
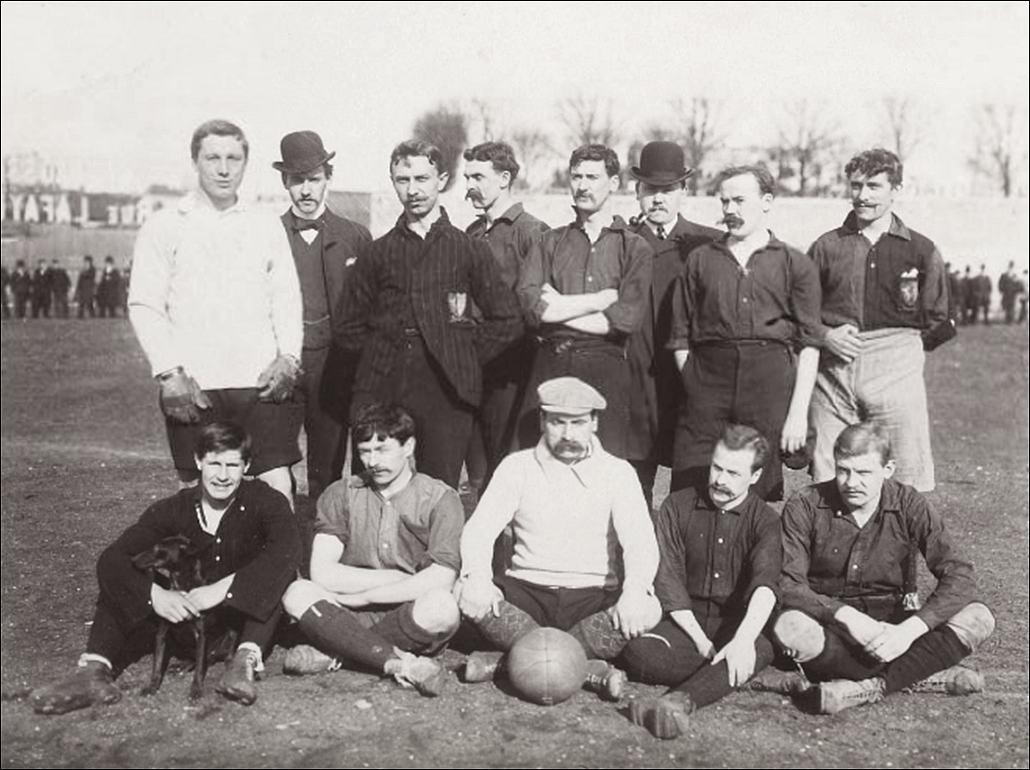
Ferris with the Standard team before the 1902 Coupe Dewar final on 16 March.

Together with William Attrill, Alfred Short, and Edward Theobald, Ferris was a member of the Standard team that won the 1901 USFSA Football Championship, starting as a full-back in the final against Le Havre on 14 April, in which he "frequently saved the situation" and "ruthlessly stopped all the opposing charges" in a 1–1 draw, thus forcing a replay two weeks later at Stade Langstaff, which he was unable to play because the USFSA Commission ruled him ineligible after Le Havre filed a request for his disqualification on the basis that Ferris lived in Seine-Inférieure and could not prove he resided in Paris. Either way, Standard claimed the title with a 6–1 victory.

The following year, on 16 March 1902, Ferris started in the final of the 1902 Coupe Dewar, helping his side keep a clean-sheet in a 1–0 win over United SC; the following day, the journalists of the French newspaper L'Auto (forerunner to L'Équipe) stated that he was the team's best player, along with Jordan and goalscorer Wooley. In 1902, Ferris left Standard AC to join Rouen, bringing both his skills and valuable experience, which he put at the service of the club for several years, being later imitated by the Englishmen Billy Barnes and Charlie Witty. Despite being licensed to Rouen, Ferris started in the final of the 1904 Coupe Dewar on 17 April, strangely as a forward, helping his side to a 2–1 victory.

On 27 April 1913, Ferris, now in his late 30s, started in the final of the USFSA national final, which ended in a 1–0 loss to SH de Marseille, a club of English and Swiss immigrants. The following day, the journalists of L'Auto stated that "the old full-back always positions himself well, but his clearances did not have their customary power", while those of La Vie au grand air stated that "despite the advice of the veteran Ferris, the youngesters of Rouen exerted themselves excessively due to overestimating their strength".

== Honours ==
Standard AC

- USFSA Football Championship:
  - Champion (1): 1901
- Coupe Dewar:
  - Champion (2): 1902 and 1904

== Bibliography ==
- Pessiot, Guy (2004). Histoire de Rouen : 1900-1939 en 800 photographies [History of Rouen: 1900-1939 in 800 photographs] (in French). Paris: Des Falaises. p. 320. ISBN 978-2-906-25886-0.
