= Jimmy Carré =

French footballer

Personal information
- Place of birth: France
- Position: Forward

Senior career*
Years	Team	Apps	(Gls)
1899–1902	Le Havre		
1902–1905	Standard AC		
- * Club domestic league appearances and goals

Jimmy Carré was a French footballer who played as a forward for Le Havre and Standard AC at the turn of the 20th century.

== Rugby career ==
In April 1899, Jimmy Carré started for the rugby team of Le Havre AC in a 12–6 loss to RC France, marking the team's revival after a period of inertia between 1896 and 1899, a victim of the success of the team's football section.

== Football career ==
On 19 February 1899, Carré started for Le Havre in the semifinals of the 1899 USFSA Football Championship against Iris Club Lillois at the Parc des Princes, which only lasted 45 minutes due to organizational problems (0–0). Following the withdrawals of both Lillois and Club Français in the final, Le Havre was proclaimed the French champions, becoming the first club to do so without having played a single game. The following year, on 29 April 1900, he started in the final of the 1900 Challenge International du Nord against Club Français in Tourcoing, narrowly missing a goal as Le Havre won 3–2 after extra-time. The following week, on 6 May, he started in the final of the 1900 USFSA Championship against Club Français, helping his side to a 1–0 victory, thus achieving their third consecutive victory in finals, all against Club Français.

The following year, on 14 April, Carré captained Le Havre in the final of the 1901 USFSA Championship against his future club Standard AC, in which he scored an equaliser to salvage a 1–1 draw, thus forcing a replay two weeks later at Stade Langstaff, which ended in a 6–1 loss.

Having joined Standard, Carré started in the final of the 1904 Coupe Dewar on 17 April, scoring a goal from a corner kick to help his side to a 2–1 victory. In May 1916, a certain Carré was playing for Le Havre, most likely a relative.

== Honours ==
Le Havre AC

- USFSA Football Championship
  - Champions (2): 1899 and 1900
  - Runner-up (1): 1901
- Challenge International du Nord:
  - Champions (1): 1900

Standard AC

- Coupe Dewar:
  - Champion (1): 1904
