= Big Five (association football) =

Group of European association football markets

Map showing the Big Five countries with their men's top-division leagues: England (Premier League) France (Ligue 1) Germany (Bundesliga) Italy (Serie A) Spain (La Liga)

The Big Five is a collective term in association football for five leading European men's club football leagues: England's Premier League, France's Ligue 1, Germany's Bundesliga, Italy's Serie A, and Spain's La Liga.

The Premier League in England is the most financially lucrative league; it generates billions in revenue annually and holds the largest worldwide audience. The Premier League is also known for being home to the "Big Six" teams. The Bundesliga in Germany is celebrated for its high attendance rates and fan engagement. La Liga in Spain is the home to the clubs FC Barcelona and Real Madrid, two of the largest clubs in the world with a combined 20 Champions Leagues between them. Italy's Serie A is known for its tactical sophistication. France's Ligue 1 is considered the smallest of the "Big Five", holding the smallest audience and financial standing of the five. It is most known for producing and enriching young talent, as well as its largest club, Paris Saint-Germain.

== Summary ==
=== Men's competitions ===
Leagues
Country	League	Champions					
Country	League	Most titles	2025–26	2024–25	2023–24	2022–23	2021–22
England	Premier League	Manchester United (20); Liverpool (20)	Arsenal	Liverpool	Manchester City		
France	Ligue 1	Paris Saint-Germain (14)	Paris Saint-Germain				
Germany	Bundesliga	Bayern Munich (35)	Bayern Munich		Bayer Leverkusen	Bayern Munich	
Italy	Serie A	Juventus (36)	Inter Milan	Napoli	Inter Milan	Napoli	Milan
Spain	La Liga	Real Madrid (36)	Barcelona		Real Madrid	Barcelona	Real Madrid

Cups
Country	Cup	Winners					
Country	Cup	Most titles	2025–26	2024–25	2023–24	2022–23	2021–22
England	FA Cup	Arsenal (14)	Manchester City	Crystal Palace	Manchester United	Manchester City	Liverpool
France	Coupe de France	Paris Saint-Germain (16)	Lens	Paris Saint-Germain		Toulouse	Nantes
Germany	DFB-Pokal	Bayern Munich (21)	Bayern Munich	VfB Stuttgart	Bayer Leverkusen	RB Leipzig	
Italy	Coppa Italia	Juventus (15)	Inter Milan	Bologna	Juventus	Inter Milan	
Spain	Copa del Rey	Barcelona (32)	Real Sociedad	Barcelona	Athletic Bilbao	Real Madrid	Real Betis

League cups
Country	Cup	Champions					
Country	Cup	Most titles	2025–26	2024–25	2023–24	2022–23	2021–22
England	EFL Cup	Liverpool (10)	Manchester City	Newcastle United	Liverpool	Manchester United	Liverpool

== Market ==
European football market size 2026–27 (€45.7 billion market)
No.	Market Leaders	Revenues (€ billion)	Share
1	Big Five top-leagues	22.4	49%
2	All non-Big Five leagues	10.9	23.9%
3	FIFA, UEFA, and national associations	7.3	16%
4	Big Five countries’ other leagues	5.1	11.2%
Revenue from the top national leagues in England, France, Germany, Italy and Spain; Revenue from all professional leagues (except top division) in England, France, Germany, Italy and Spain; Revenue from all national leagues in all other 50 UEFA associations outside the Big Five; Total cumulative European revenues of FIFA, UEFA and national associations

Driven by the boost from the 2022 FIFA World Cup, revenue in the European football market grew by 16% in the 2022–23 season, reaching €35.3 billion. The Big Five domestic leagues continued to dominate, generating €19.6 billion—or 56%—of the total market. According to Deloitte, their combined revenue is projected to rise to €22.4 billion for the 2026–27 season, accounting for 49% of the market.

In the Big Five leagues, broadcast revenue has traditionally been the primary source of income for clubs; however, its sluggish growth in the early 2020s has led many clubs to pursue greater control over both their earnings and how they expand them. The 2022–23 season saw record-breaking matchday (€2.8bn) and commercial (€7.6bn) revenues. Within the Big Five, England's Premier League is considerably larger than the other four in terms of both popularity and wealth, with both factors influencing the other; league wealth is mostly derived from selling broadcasting rights to global markets based on the league's popularity worldwide, with competing bids. The German Bundesliga enjoys the highest average match attendance, while brand value is strongest in the main teams of Spain's La Liga, namely Real Madrid and Barcelona.

The UEFA Financial Fair Play Regulations significantly enhanced the financial performance of European football. These regulations eradicated overdue payables and converted an aggregate net loss of EUR 1.7 billion in 2010–11 into a net profit of EUR 579 million in 2016–17. Additionally, net equity positions, reflecting the balance sheet solvency or financial health of European first division clubs, have markedly improved over the past decade, as in the compound annual growth rate (CAGR) of net equity for the Big Five leagues, which has ranged from 7.5% in England to 17.9% in France.

In December 2012, Bleacher Report noted that the Big Five all benefit from having "developed their own 'brand' of how football should be played." The website suggested that the Netherlands' top league Eredivisie was considered similarly to the Big Five in footballing terms, but did not reach the same popularity or funding levels because it is overlooked by international fans in favour of the Five.

== Quality ==
The Big Five are seen as the collective leagues where the best players in the world go to develop and shine, and it is accepted that the Big Five "represent the pinnacle of European football". Football fans, particularly in different regions, often debate the quality of each league compared to the others. As of 2024, the Big Five lead the UEFA coefficient for men's domestic leagues in Europe.

The coefficient ranks on performance of domestic teams in European competitions; football analytics website Breaking the Lines suggested that the continued dominance of the Big Five in the coefficient for men's football relies on teams from other nations – which may be as good or better than Big Five teams when fielding their best XI – thinking there is more security in aiming for domestic titles rather than European ones, and Big Five teams having the resources available to perform in both. The dominance of recent times is particularly evident in the most prestigious club competition in European football in the UEFA Champions League, in which only teams from the Big Five have participated in the finals since the 2004 final, where Porto has been the last club outside the Big Five competing in a final. In terms of national teams, they are also the only five European nations that have won the FIFA World Cup.

In 2021, several men's teams from the Big Five leagues in England, Italy, and Spain attempted to create a European Super League, but received pushback. Teams from Germany and France were reportedly invited to join the project, but declined. Top performing football players (with high playing potential) outside the Big Five leagues, are usually signed by clubs within the Big Five leagues, as the clubs in the Big Five leagues are the most competitive in terms of performance, earn more (due to larger fan bases, higher ticket sales, television broadcast rights revenue and merchandise sales) and furthermore are able to provide attractive salaries. However, due to the higher salaries offered by Saudi Pro League clubs (in association with the Public Investment Fund), numerous high-profile players such as Cristiano Ronaldo, Neymar, and Sadio Mané had moved away from the Big Five leagues, heading to Saudi Arabia.

== Records and statistics ==
=== Clubs ===
==== Performance in current UEFA top-tier competitions ====
As of 30 May 2026

Men's football
Competition		Spain	England	Italy	Germany	France	Note
European Cup / Champions League	Winners	20	15	12	8	3	58 of 71 European Cup / UEFA Champions League seasons (82%) has been won by a club from the Big Five
European Cup / Champions League	Finalists	31	27	30	19	9	116 of 142 European Cup / UEFA Champions League finalists (82%) has been clubs from the Big Five
UEFA Cup / Europa League	Winners	14	11	10	7	–	42 of 55 UEFA Cup / Europa League seasons (76%) has been won by a club from the Big Five
UEFA Cup / Europa League	Finalists	19	20	18	17	5	79 of 110 UEFA Cup / Europa League finalists (72%) has been clubs from the Big Five
UEFA Conference League	Winners	–	3	1	–	–	4 of 5 UEFA Conference League seasons (80%) has been won by a club from the Big Five
UEFA Conference League	Finalists	2	3	3	–	–	8 of 10 UEFA Conference League finalists (80%) has been clubs from the Big Five
Grand total	**Winners**	**34**	**29**	**23**	**15**	**3**	104 of 131 current UEFA top-tier competitions (79%) has been won by a club from the Big Five
Grand total	**Finalists**	52	50	51	36	14	203 of 262 current UEFA top-tier competition finalists (77%) has been clubs from the Big Five

==== Performance in defunct UEFA top-tier competitions ====
In contrast to the current UEFA competitions, the Cup Winners' Cup also showed a dominance of the Big Five, but this was significantly lower in terms of title success (over 69%) and final participation (over 62%). This should be explained by the fact that only one participant from the respective leagues could take part in this tournament as a national cup winner or national cup finalist, if the cup winner qualified for the European Cup / UEFA Champions League. Therefore only one participant from the respective leagues (unless the defending champions did not qualify for any other UEFA competition, then it were two) took part in this competition.

Men's football
Competition		England	Spain	Italy	Germany^{†}	France	Note
UEFA Cup Winners' Cup (defunct)	Winners	8	7	7	4	1	27 of 39 UEFA Cup Winners' Cup seasons (69%) were won by a club from the Big Five
UEFA Cup Winners' Cup (defunct)	Finalists	13	14	11	8	3	49 of 78 UEFA Cup Winners' Cup finalists (63%) were clubs from the Big Five

^{†} excluding clubs from East Germany

==== List of Champions in the Big Five ====
The table below shows the winning teams in all men's Big Five leagues by season.

- Single-year seasons (mostly referring to the championship tournaments in early years) have been converted into currently-used season format.

Season	England	Germany	Spain	Italy	France
1888–89	Preston North End	---	---	---	---
1889–90	Preston North End	---	---	---	---
1890–91	Everton	---	---	---	---
1891–92	Sunderland	---	---	---	---
1892–93	Sunderland	---	---	---	---
1893–94	Aston Villa	---	---	---	Standard Athletic Club
1894–95	Sunderland	---	---	---	Standard Athletic Club
1895–96	Aston Villa	---	---	---	Club Français
1896–97	Aston Villa	---	---	---	Standard Athletic Club
1897–98	Sheffield United	---	---	Genoa	Standard Athletic Club
1898–99	Aston Villa	---	---	Genoa	Le Havre
1899–1900	Aston Villa	---	---	Genoa	Le Havre
1900–01	Liverpool	---	---	Milan	Standard Athletic Club
1901–02	Sunderland	---	---	Genoa	Roubaix
1902–03	The Wednesday	VfB Leipzig	---	Genoa	Roubaix
1903–04	The Wednesday	No champions	---	Genoa	Roubaix
1904–05	Newcastle United	Union 92 Berlin	---	Juventus	Gallia Club Paris
1905–06	Liverpool	VfB Leipzig	---	Milan	Roubaix
1906–07	Newcastle United	Freiburger FC	---	Milan	RC Paris
1907–08	Manchester United	Viktoria Berlin	---	Pro Vercelli	Roubaix
1908–09	Newcastle United	Phönix Karlsruhe	---	Pro Vercelli	Stade Helvétique
1909–10	Aston Villa	Karlsruher FV	---	Inter Milan	US Tourcoing
1910–11	Manchester United	Viktoria Berlin	---	Pro Vercelli	Stade Helvétique
1911–12	Blackburn Rovers	Holstein Kiel	---	Pro Vercelli	Saint-Raphaël
1912–13	Sunderland	VfB Leipzig	---	Pro Vercelli	Stade Helvétique
1913–14	Blackburn Rovers	SpVgg Fürth	---	Casale	Olympique Lillois
1914–15	Everton	---	---	Genoa	---
1915–16	---	---	---	---	---
1916–17	---	---	---	---	---
1917–18	---	---	---	---	---
1918–19	---	---	---	---	Le Havre
1919–20	West Bromwich Albion	1. FC Nürnberg	---	Inter Milan	---
1920–21	Burnley	1. FC Nürnberg	---	Pro Vercelli	---
1921–22	Liverpool	No champions	---	Novese	---
1922–23	Liverpool	Hamburger SV	---	Genoa	---
1923–24	Huddersfield Town	1. FC Nürnberg	---	Genoa	---
1924–25	Huddersfield Town	1. FC Nürnberg	---	Bologna	---
1925–26	Huddersfield Town	SpVgg Fürth	---	Juventus	---
1926–27	Newcastle United	1. FC Nürnberg	---	---	CA Paris
1927–28	Everton	Hamburger SV	---	Torino	Stade Français
1928–29	The Wednesday	SpVgg Fürth	Barcelona	Bologna	Marseille
1929–30	Sheffield Wednesday	Hertha BSC	Athletic Bilbao	Inter Milan	---
1930–31	Arsenal	Hertha BSC	Athletic Bilbao	Juventus	---
1931–32	Everton	Bayern Munich	Madrid FC (Note: Real Madrid were known as Madrid FC from 1931 until 1941.)	Juventus	---
1932–33	Arsenal	Fortuna Düsseldorf	Madrid FC	Juventus	Olympique Lillois
1933–34	Arsenal	Schalke 04	Athletic Bilbao	Juventus	Sète
1934–35	Arsenal	Schalke 04	Real Betis	Juventus	Sochaux
1935–36	Sunderland	1. FC Nürnberg	Athletic Bilbao	Bologna	RC Paris
1936–37	Manchester City	Schalke 04	---	Bologna	Marseille
1937–38	Arsenal	Hannover 96	---	Inter Milan	Sochaux
1938–39	Everton	Schalke 04	---	Bologna	Sète
1939–40	---	Schalke 04	Atlético Aviación (Note: Atlético Madrid were known as Atlético Aviación from 1939 until 1947.)	Inter Milan	---
1940–41	---	Rapid Wien	Atlético Aviación	Bologna	---
1941–42	---	Schalke 04	Valencia	Roma	---
1942–43	---	Dresdner SC	Athletic Bilbao	Torino	---
1943–44	---	Dresdner SC	Valencia	---	---
1944–45	---	---	Barcelona	---	---
1945–46	---	---	Sevilla	Torino	Lille
1946–47	Liverpool	---	Valencia	Torino	Roubaix-Tourcoing
1947–48	Arsenal	1. FC Nürnberg	Barcelona	Torino	Marseille
1948–49	Portsmouth	VfR Mannheim	Barcelona	Torino	Reims
1949–50	Portsmouth	VfB Stuttgart	Atlético Madrid	Juventus	Bordeaux
1950–51	Tottenham Hotspur	1. FC Kaiserslautern	Atlético Madrid	Milan	Nice
1951–52	Manchester United	VfB Stuttgart	Barcelona	Juventus	Nice
1952–53	Arsenal	1. FC Kaiserslautern	Barcelona	Inter Milan	Reims
1953–54	Wolverhampton Wanderers	Hannover 96	Real Madrid	Inter Milan	Lille
1954–55	Chelsea	Rot-Weiss Essen	Real Madrid	Milan	Reims
1955–56	Manchester United	Borussia Dortmund	Athletic Bilbao	Fiorentina	Nice
1956–57	Manchester United	Borussia Dortmund	Real Madrid	Milan	Saint-Étienne
1957–58	Wolverhampton Wanderers	Schalke 04	Real Madrid	Juventus	Reims
1958–59	Wolverhampton Wanderers	Eintracht Frankfurt	Barcelona	Milan	Nice
1959–60	Burnley	Hamburger SV	Barcelona	Juventus	Reims
1960–61	Tottenham Hotspur	1. FC Nürnberg	Real Madrid	Juventus	Monaco
1961–62	Ipswich Town	1. FC Köln	Real Madrid	Milan	Reims
1962–63	Everton	Borussia Dortmund	Real Madrid	Inter Milan	Monaco
1963–64	Liverpool	1. FC Köln	Real Madrid	Bologna	Saint-Étienne
1964–65	Manchester United	Werder Bremen	Real Madrid	Inter Milan	Nantes
1965–66	Liverpool	1860 Munich	Atlético Madrid	Inter Milan	Nantes
1966–67	Manchester United	Eintracht Braunschweig	Real Madrid	Juventus	Saint-Étienne
1967–68	Manchester City	1. FC Nürnberg	Real Madrid	Milan	Saint-Étienne
1968–69	Leeds United	Bayern Munich	Real Madrid	Fiorentina	Saint-Étienne
1969–70	Everton	Borussia Mönchengladbach	Atlético Madrid	Cagliari	Saint-Étienne
1970–71	Arsenal	Borussia Mönchengladbach	Valencia	Inter Milan	Marseille
1971–72	Derby County	Bayern Munich	Real Madrid	Juventus	Marseille
1972–73	Liverpool	Bayern Munich	Atlético Madrid	Juventus	Nantes
1973–74	Leeds United	Bayern Munich	Barcelona	Lazio	Saint-Étienne
1974–75	Derby County	Borussia Mönchengladbach	Real Madrid	Juventus	Saint-Étienne
1975–76	Liverpool	Borussia Mönchengladbach	Real Madrid	Torino	Saint-Étienne
1976–77	Liverpool	Borussia Mönchengladbach	Atlético Madrid	Juventus	Nantes
1977–78	Nottingham Forest	1. FC Köln	Real Madrid	Juventus	Monaco
1978–79	Liverpool	Hamburger SV	Real Madrid	Milan	Strasbourg
1979–80	Liverpool	Bayern Munich	Real Madrid	Inter Milan	Nantes
1980–81	Aston Villa	Bayern Munich	Real Sociedad	Juventus	Saint-Étienne
1981–82	Liverpool	Hamburger SV	Real Sociedad	Juventus	Monaco
1982–83	Liverpool	Hamburger SV	Athletic Bilbao	Roma	Nantes
1983–84	Liverpool	VfB Stuttgart	Athletic Bilbao	Juventus	Bordeaux
1984–85	Everton	Bayern Munich	Barcelona	Hellas Verona	Bordeaux
1985–86	Liverpool	Bayern Munich	Real Madrid	Juventus	Paris Saint-Germain
1986–87	Everton	Bayern Munich	Real Madrid	Napoli	Bordeaux
1987–88	Liverpool	Werder Bremen	Real Madrid	Milan	Monaco
1988–89	Arsenal	Bayern Munich	Real Madrid	Inter Milan	Marseille
1989–90	Liverpool	Bayern Munich	Real Madrid	Napoli	Marseille
1990–91	Arsenal	1. FC Kaiserslautern	Barcelona	Sampdoria	Marseille
1991–92	Leeds United	VfB Stuttgart	Barcelona	Milan	Marseille
1992–93	Manchester United	Werder Bremen	Barcelona	Milan	---
1993–94	Manchester United	Bayern Munich	Barcelona	Milan	Paris Saint-Germain
1994–95	Blackburn Rovers	Borussia Dortmund	Real Madrid	Juventus	Nantes
1995–96	Manchester United	Borussia Dortmund	Atlético Madrid	Milan	Auxerre
1996–97	Manchester United	Bayern Munich	Real Madrid	Juventus	Monaco
1997–98	Arsenal	1. FC Kaiserslautern	Barcelona	Juventus	Lens
1998–99	Manchester United	Bayern Munich	Barcelona	Milan	Bordeaux
1999–2000	Manchester United	Bayern Munich	Deportivo La Coruña	Lazio	Monaco
2000–01	Manchester United	Bayern Munich	Real Madrid	Roma	Nantes
2001–02	Arsenal	Borussia Dortmund	Valencia	Juventus	Lyon
2002–03	Manchester United	Bayern Munich	Real Madrid	Juventus	Lyon
2003–04	Arsenal	Werder Bremen	Valencia	Milan	Lyon
2004–05	Chelsea	Bayern Munich	Barcelona	---	Lyon
2005–06	Chelsea	Bayern Munich	Barcelona	Inter Milan	Lyon
2006–07	Manchester United	VfB Stuttgart	Real Madrid	Inter Milan	Lyon
2007–08	Manchester United	Bayern Munich	Real Madrid	Inter Milan	Lyon
2008–09	Manchester United	VfL Wolfsburg	Barcelona	Inter Milan	Bordeaux
2009–10	Chelsea	Bayern Munich	Barcelona	Inter Milan	Marseille
2010–11	Manchester United	Borussia Dortmund	Barcelona	Milan	Lille
2011–12	Manchester City	Borussia Dortmund	Real Madrid	Juventus	Montpellier
2012–13	Manchester United	Bayern Munich	Barcelona	Juventus	Paris Saint-Germain
2013–14	Manchester City	Bayern Munich	Atlético Madrid	Juventus	Paris Saint-Germain
2014–15	Chelsea	Bayern Munich	Barcelona	Juventus	Paris Saint-Germain
2015–16	Leicester City	Bayern Munich	Barcelona	Juventus	Paris Saint-Germain
2016–17	Chelsea	Bayern Munich	Real Madrid	Juventus	Monaco
2017–18	Manchester City	Bayern Munich	Barcelona	Juventus	Paris Saint-Germain
2018–19	Manchester City	Bayern Munich	Barcelona	Juventus	Paris Saint-Germain
2019–20	Liverpool	Bayern Munich	Real Madrid	Juventus	Paris Saint-Germain
2020–21	Manchester City	Bayern Munich	Atlético Madrid	Inter Milan	Lille
2021–22	Manchester City	Bayern Munich	Real Madrid	Milan	Paris Saint-Germain
2022–23	Manchester City	Bayern Munich	Barcelona	Napoli	Paris Saint-Germain
2023–24	Manchester City	Bayer Leverkusen	Real Madrid	Inter Milan	Paris Saint-Germain
2024–25	Liverpool	Bayern Munich	Barcelona	Napoli	Paris Saint-Germain
2025–26	Arsenal	Bayern Munich	Barcelona	Inter Milan	Paris Saint-Germain

Sources: English football champions, German football champions, Spanish football champions, Italian football champions, French football champions

==== Record champions in the Big Five ====
Record champions (top 10) in all men's Big Five leagues
England	Germany	Spain	Italy	France
20 – Manchester United; 20 – Liverpool; 14 – Arsenal; 10 – Manchester City; 9 – Everton; 7 – Aston Villa; 6 – Chelsea; 6 – Sunderland; 4 – Newcastle United; 4 – Sheffield Wednesday	35 – Bayern Munich; 9 – 1. FC Nürnberg; 8 – Borussia Dortmund; 7 – Schalke 04; 7 – Hamburger SV; 5 – Borussia Mönchengladbach; 5 – VfB Stuttgart; 4 – 1. FC Kaiserslautern; 4 – Werder Bremen; 3 – 1. FC Köln; 3 – VfB Leipzig; 3 – SpVgg Fürth	36 – Real Madrid; 29 – Barcelona; 11 – Atlético Madrid; 8 – Athletic Bilbao; 6 – Valencia; 2 – Real Sociedad; 1 – Deportivo La Coruña; 1 – Real Betis; 1 – Sevilla	36 – Juventus; 21 – Inter Milan; 19 – Milan; 9 – Genoa; 7 – Torino; 7 – Bologna; 7 – Pro Vercelli; 4 – Napoli; 3 – Roma; 2 – Fiorentina; 2 – Lazio	14 – Paris Saint-Germain; 10 – Saint-Étienne; 9 – Marseille; 8 – Monaco; 8 – Nantes; 7 – Lyon; 6 – Olympique Lillois/Lille; 6 – Bordeaux; 6 – Reims; 6 – Roubaix

=== Players ===
Abbreviations
ENG	≙	Football League First Division / Premier League (1888–1992 / 1992–)
FRA	≙	USFSA Championship / Ligue 1 (1896–1932 / 1932–)
GER	≙	German Champions / Bundesliga (1903–1963 / 1963–)
ITA	≙	Serie A (1898–)
ESP	≙	La Liga (1929–)

- **Bold** indicates player is still active at in the Big Five Leagues. Players in italics are still active outside the Big Five Leagues.

==== List of top scorers in the Big Five Leagues ====
- Does **not include** goals scored in the lower divisions.
- As of 1 November 2026

List of top scorers in the Big Five Leagues (250 or more goals)
Rank	Player	Nationality	Goals	Itemized Goals	Period
1	Lionel Messi	Argentina	496	(474) ESP (22) FRA	2004–2023
2	Cristiano Ronaldo	Portugal	495	(103) ENG (311) ESP (81) ITA	2003–2022
3	Robert Lewandowski	Poland	395	(312) GER (83) ESP	2010–2026
4	Jimmy Greaves	England	366	(357) ENG (9) ITA	1957–1971
5	Gerd Müller	West Germany	365	(365) GER	1965–1979
6	**Harry Kane**	England	315	(213) ENG (102) GER	2012–
7	Steve Bloomer	England	314	(314) ENG	1892–1914
8	Dixie Dean	England	310	(310) ENG	1924–1938
9	Zlatan Ibrahimović	Sweden	302	(156) ITA (16) ESP (113) FRA (17) ENG	2004–2023
10	Delio Onnis	Argentina	299	(299) FRA	1971–1986
11	Gordon Hodgson	England	288	(288) ENG	1925–1939
12	Alan Shearer	England	283	(283) ENG	1988–2006
13	Karim Benzema	France	281	(43) FRA (238) ESP	2004–2023
14	Silvio Piola	Italy	274	(274) ITA	1929–1954
15	Klaus Fischer	West Germany	268	(268) GER	1968–1988
16	Edinson Cavani	Uruguay	267	(112) ITA (138) FRA (12) ENG (5) ESP	2007–2023
17	Sergio Agüero	Argentina	259	(184) ENG (75) ESP	2006–2022
17	**Kylian Mbappé**	France	259	(191) FRA (68) ESP	2015–
19	Charlie Buchan	England	258	(258) ENG	1912–1928
20	David Jack	England	257	(257) ENG	1920–1938
21	Raúl	Spain	256	(228) ESP (28) GER	1994–2012
22	Nat Lofthouse	England	255	(255) ENG	1946–1960
22	Bernard Lacombe	France	255	(255) FRA	1969–1987
24	Telmo Zarra	Spain	251	(251) ESP	1940–1955
24	**Pierre-Emerick Aubameyang**	Gabon	251	(68) FRA (98) GER (69) ENG (16) ESP	2009–
26	Francesco Totti	Italy	250	(250) ITA	1992–2017

==== List of players with the most 'League Top Scorer' awards ====
List of players with the most 'League Top Scorer' awards (5 or more awards)
Rank	Player	Nationality	Awards	Itemized Awards	Period
1	Lionel Messi	Argentina	8	(8) ESP	2004–2023
1	Robert Lewandowski	Poland	8	(7) GER (1) ESP	2010–2026
1	**Kylian Mbappé**	France	8	(6) FRA (2) ESP	2015–
4	Gerd Müller	West Germany	7	(7) GER	1965–1979
5	Telmo Zarra	Spain	6	(6) ESP	1939–1957
5	Jimmy Greaves	England	6	(6) ENG	1957–1980
5	**Harry Kane**	England	6	(3) ENG (3) GER	2012–
8	Stephen Bloomer	England	5	(5) ENG	1891–1914
8	Gunnar Nordahl	Sweden	5	(5) ITA	1949–1958
8	Alfredo Di Stéfano	Argentina/Spain	5	(5) ESP	1953–1966
8	Quini	Spain	5	(5) ESP	1967–1987
8	Delio Onnis	Argentina/Italy	5	(5) FRA	1971–1986
8	Carlos Bianchi	Argentina	5	(5) FRA	1973–1985
8	Jean-Pierre Papin	France	5	(5) FRA	1981–2004
8	Hugo Sánchez	Mexico	5	(5) ESP	1981–1997
8	Cristiano Ronaldo	Portugal	5	(1) ENG (3) ESP (1) ITA	2003–2022
8	Zlatan Ibrahimović	Sweden	5	(2) ITA (3) FRA	2004–2023

Sources: English football first tier top scorers by season, Bundesliga top scorers by season, La Liga top scorers by season, Serie A top scorers by season, Ligue 1 top scorers by season

==== List of players with the most games played ====
- Does **not include** games played in the lower divisions.
- As of 24 May 2026

List of most games played in the Big Five Leagues (650 or more games)
Rank	Player	Nationality	Games	Itemized Games	Period
1	Peter Shilton	England	848	(848) ENG	1966–1997
2	John Hollins	England	714	(714) ENG	1963–1984
3	Ray Clemence	England	710	(710) ENG	1965–1988
4	Pat Jennings	Northern Ireland	709	(709) ENG	1963–1986
5	Martin Peters	England	688	(688) ENG	1961–1980
6	Gianluigi Buffon	Italy	674	(657) ITA (17) FRA	1995–2021
7	Ryan Giggs	Wales	672	(672) ENG	1990–2014
8	Joaquín	Spain	671	(622) ESP (49) ITA	2001–2023
9	Pepe Reina	Spain	665	(297) ENG (202) ITA (163) ESP (3) GER	2000–2025
10	Mick Mills	England	658	(658) ENG	1968–1985
10	James Milner	England	658	(658) ENG	2002–2026
12	Gareth Barry	England	653	(653) ENG	1997–2018

==== List of players with the most league titles ====
- Does **not include** titles that the player transferred from the winning club at the beginning or middle of the season.
- The player must have played at least one league game for a title to be listed.

List of players with the most league titles (10 or more titles)
Rank	Player	Nationality	Titles	Itemized Titles	Period
1	Ryan Giggs	Wales	13	(13) ENG	1990–2014
1	Thomas Müller	Germany	13	(13) GER	2008–2025
1	**Manuel Neuer**	Germany	13	(13) GER	2006–
1	Robert Lewandowski	Poland	13	(10) GER (3) ESP	2010–2026
5	Paco Gento	Spain	12	(12) ESP	1952–1971
5	Lionel Messi	Argentina	12	(10) ESP (2) FRA	2004–2023
5	**David Alaba**	Austria	12	(10) GER (2) ESP	2010–
5	Kingsley Coman	France	12	(2) FRA (1) ITA (9) GER	2012–2025
9	Paul Scholes	England	11	(11) ENG	1994–2013
9	Gianluigi Buffon	Italy	11	(10) ITA (1) FRA	1995–2021
9	Arjen Robben	Netherlands	11	(2) ENG (1) ESP (8) GER	2004–2019
9	Thiago	Spain	11	(4) ESP (7) GER	2008–2024
9	**Marquinhos**	Brazil	11	(11) FRA	2012–
14	Pirri	Spain	10	(10) ESP	1964–1980
14	Gary Neville	England	10	(10) ENG	1992–2011
14	Zlatan Ibrahimović	Sweden	10	(5) ITA (1) ESP (4) FRA	2004–2023
14	**Joshua Kimmich**	Germany	10	(10) GER	2015–

==== List of players with the most different Big Five league titles ====
- Does **not include** titles that the player transferred from the winning club at the beginning or middle of the season.
- The player must have played at least one league game for a title to be listed.

List of players with the most different Big Five league titles won
R	Player	Nationality	DL	(England)	(Spain)	(Italy)	(Germany)	(France)	Period
1	**João Cancelo**	Portugal	4	Yes	Yes	Yes	Yes	No	2013–
2	Jens Lehmann	Germany	3	Yes	No	Yes	Yes	No	1987–2011
2	Claude Makélélé	France	3	Yes	Yes	No	No	Yes	1991–2011
2	Thierry Henry	France	3	Yes	Yes	No	No	Yes	1994–2012
2	Arjen Robben	Netherlands	3	Yes	Yes	No	Yes	No	2000–2021
2	Gabriel Heinze	Argentina	3	Yes	Yes	No	No	Yes	1996–2014
2	Mark van Bommel	Netherlands	3	No	Yes	Yes	Yes	No	1992–2013
2	David Beckham	England	3	Yes	Yes	No	No	Yes	1992–2013
2	Maxwell	Brazil	3	No	Yes	Yes	No	Yes	2000–2017
2	Zlatan Ibrahimović	Sweden	3	No	Yes	Yes	No	Yes	1999–2023
2	Thiago Motta	Italy	3	No	Yes	Yes	No	Yes	1999–2018
2	Tiago Mendes	Portugal	3	Yes	Yes	No	No	Yes	1999–2017
2	Sami Khedira	Germany	3	No	Yes	Yes	Yes	No	2006–2021
2	Kingsley Coman	France	3	No	No	Yes	Yes	Yes	2013–
2	Dani Alves	Brazil	3	No	Yes	Yes	No	Yes	2001–2023
2	Cristiano Ronaldo	Portugal	3	Yes	Yes	Yes	No	No	2002–
2	Lassana Diarra	France	3	Yes	Yes	No	No	Yes	2004–2019
2	Arturo Vidal	Chile	3	No	Yes	Yes	Yes	No	2005–
2	Eden Hazard	Belgium	3	Yes	Yes	No	No	Yes	2007–2023
2	Danilo	Brazil	3	Yes	Yes	Yes	No	No	2009–
2	**Brahim Díaz**	Morocco	3	Yes	Yes	Yes	No	No	2016–

João Cancelo is the first and only player to have won league titles in four of Big Five leagues.

==== List of players to have played the Big Five Leagues ====
The table below show the players who have played in all Big Five Leagues.

Player	England	France	Germany	Italy	Spain	Scored
(Romania) Florin Răducioiu	West Ham United	Monaco	VfB Stuttgart	Bari	Espanyol	Yes
(Romania) Florin Răducioiu	West Ham United	Monaco	VfB Stuttgart	Brescia	Espanyol	Yes
(Romania) Florin Răducioiu	West Ham United	Monaco	VfB Stuttgart	Hellas Verona	Espanyol	Yes
(Romania) Florin Răducioiu	West Ham United	Monaco	VfB Stuttgart	Milan	Espanyol	Yes
(Denmark) Christian Poulsen	Liverpool	Evian	Schalke 04	Juventus	Sevilla	No
(Montenegro) Stevan Jovetić	Manchester City	Monaco	Hertha BSC	Inter Milan	Sevilla	Yes
(Montenegro) Stevan Jovetić	Manchester City	Monaco	Hertha BSC	Fiorentina	Sevilla	Yes
(Netherlands) Justin Kluivert	Bournemouth	Nice	RB Leipzig	Roma	Valencia	Yes

=== Managers ===
==== List of managers to have coached the Big Five Leagues ====
The table below show the managers who have coached in all Big Five Leagues.

Manager	England	France	Germany	Italy	Spain
(Italy) Carlo Ancelotti	Chelsea	Paris Saint-Germain	Bayern Munich	Parma	Real Madrid
(Italy) Carlo Ancelotti	Chelsea	Paris Saint-Germain	Bayern Munich	Juventus	Real Madrid
(Italy) Carlo Ancelotti	Everton	Paris Saint-Germain	Bayern Munich		Real Madrid
(Italy) Carlo Ancelotti	Everton	Paris Saint-Germain	Bayern Munich	Milan	Real Madrid
(Italy) Carlo Ancelotti	Everton	Paris Saint-Germain	Bayern Munich	Napoli	Real Madrid

Carlo Ancelotti is the only manager to have won league titles in all Big Five leagues.
