= Charles Wilkes (footballer) =

English footballer

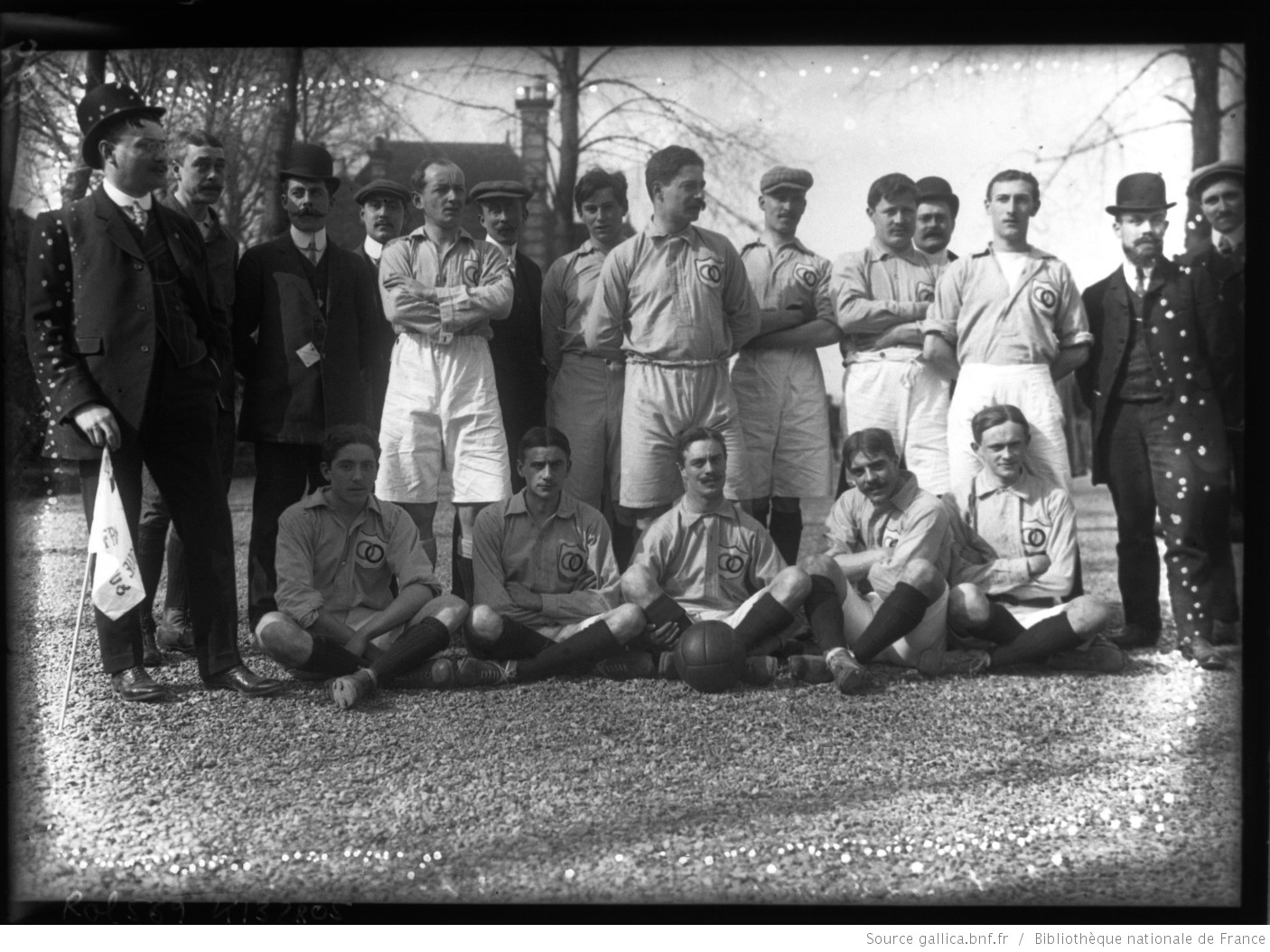
- Wilkes (standing, arms crossed on the left) in 1908

Personal information
- Full name: Charles Henry Wilkes
- Date of birth: 2 June 1879
- Place of birth: Le Havre, France
- Date of death: 27 August 1939 (aged 60)
- Place of death: Port-Bélon, France
- Position: Midfielder

Senior career*
Years	Team	Apps	(Gls)
1897–1905	Le Havre AC		
1905–1908	Le Havre Sports		

International career
1904	France (unofficial)	2	(0)
1905–1908	France	4	(0)
- * Club domestic league appearances and goals

Charles Henry Wilkes (2 June 1879 – 27 August 1939) was a French footballer who played as a midfielder who played for Le Havre AC and the French national team between 1897 and 1908.

== Early life ==
Wilkes was born in Le Havre on 2 June 1879, as the son of Edwin Villers Wilkes, an Englishman who settled in Le Havre after founding a company responsible for loading and unloading the many ships (using dockers) that operated in the Southampton-Le Havre shipping line. Charles Wilkes had two older brothers, Alfred and Edgar, all born in France, and despite being born to English parents, they all chose French nationality, which is confirmed by the fact that they did their military service (which did not exist in the United Kingdom).

== Playing career ==
=== Club career ===
Just like his brothers, Charles began his football career in his hometown club, Le Havre AC, where the great majority of his teammates were English, such as the Woods, Frank Masons, Richards, and William Taylor. Wilkes was a versatile player, capable of playing in all positions: at the back, just like his brother Alfred; in the middle, whether as a wing half (despite a certain slowness) or as a center half, and even as a forward, because he had a fairly strong shot and a good head game. In April 1897, the Wilkes brothers appeared in the HAC eleven that played the inaugural edition of Coupe Manier, which required clubs to field only three foreigners, so HAC had to use the French players of their second team, but thanks to the efforts of the Wilkes brothers, they managed to reach the final, which ended in a 3–4 loss to Club Français after extra-time.

On 19 February 1899, Charles Wilkes started as a midfielder alongside his brother Alfred (defender) in the semifinals of the 1899 USFSA Football Championship against Iris Club Lillois at the Parc des Princes, which only lasted 45 minutes due to organizational problems (0–0), and following the withdrawals of Lillois and then Club Français in the final, Le Havre was proclaimed the French champions, becoming the first club to do so without having played a single game. On 29 April 1900, Charles and Alfred Wilkes started in the final of the 1900 Challenge International du Nord against Club Français in Tourcoing, and even though one of the Wilkes left the field due to injury, Le Havre still won 3–2 after extra-time. In the following week, on 6 May, both of them started in the 1900 USFSA Football Championship final against Club Français, helping their side to a 1–0 victory, thus achieving their third consecutive victory in finals, all against Club Français.

In the following year, on 14 April, the Wilkes brothers started in the final of the 1901 USFSA Championship against Standard AC, in which Wilkes "mercilessly marked Wooley during the entire game" in an eventual 1–1 draw, so a replay had to be played held two weeks later at Stade Langstaff, and this time Wilkes was most likely given a different role since Wooley scored four goals as Standard won 6–1. In the following years, Le Havre was a semifinalist in 1902 and 1903.

The club was then undermined by dissensions, losing a good part of its best players, including the Wilkes brothers, who left to found rival clubs, such as Le Havre Sports. In November 1905, Charles slammed the door when his captain, William Taylor, ordered him to play in the midfield, while he himself wanted to play as center forward. This incident provides good hints about the personality of Charles: A strong-willed man, used to commanding and not being commanded. In October 1906, a French newspaper states that "Wilkes, long considered the pillar of HAC, has just moved to Le Havre Sports, where he is still the star". In 1911, the 32-year-old Wilkes hung up his boots to devote himself to his second passion, aeronautics.

== International career ==
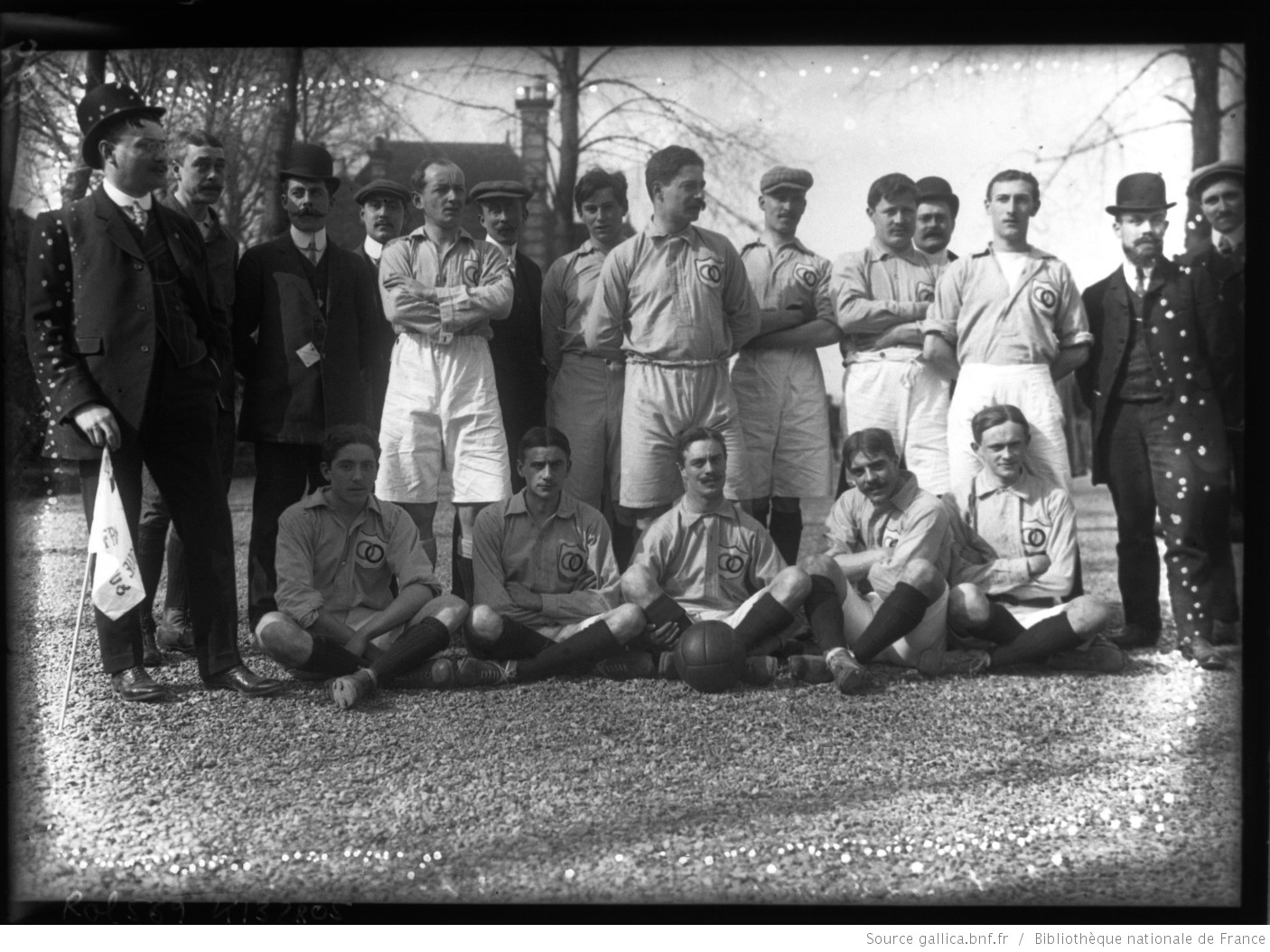
Wilkes (standing, arms crossed on the left) with the French team in 1908.

In March and April 1904, Wilkes played two matches at the Parc des Princes for an unofficial French national team, namely against Southampton (0–11) and Corinthian (4–11). Against Southampton, which was a professional team at the time, the local press noted that "Wilkes held his place brilliantly". He was thus set up to play for France in its first-ever official match against Belgium on 1 May, but he withdrew.

Wilkes made his debut for the official national side in their second-ever match on 12 February 1905, which was a friendly match against Switzerland, helping France to its first-ever victory (1–0). His obviously English surname raised the question of his nationality; however, Wilkes already had French nationality for nearly five years by then, having it chosen on 2 June 1900, the day he became an adult by turning 21 years of age, thus being the exception in the large community of English players living in Paris in those times, who were keen to preserve their identity.

Later that year, on 7 May, Wilkes earned his second international cap for France, this time against Belgium, which ended in a 0–7 loss. His international career was intermittent: two matches in 1905, only one in 1906, and a last one in 1908, for which he was called up to replace Maurice Vandendriessche, who had recently turned 21 and had chosen to become Belgian. In his last appearance, another friendly against Belgium, he played as a forward during the second half after swapping with Royet. Between 1905 and 1913, Wilkes was the only non-Parisian, non-northern player to be selected for France, with the next one being Breton Gueguen (who had played in Paris for a while).

In total, he played four matches for France between 1904 and 1908.

== Later life ==
Outside of football, Wilkes was the clerk of the family port logistics company, and in January 1915, two furious dockers attempted to murder the Wilkes brothers (Edgar and Charles) for unspecified reasons, with Edgar being hit by a revolver bullet in the groin, while a second bullet grazed Charles on the forehead, above the eye.

According to the Association of Friends of Old Havre, Wilkes built a biplane with two propellers as early as 1909, but "this brave Wilkes never took off with this machine; he taxied with difficulty and that was all". Despite this failure, Wilkes did not lose heart, and, in January 1911, he tried out a new biplane, which he had built in Le Havre, and in his first attempts, he succeeded in three flights of 500 to 1000 meters, at the height of 3 to 10 meters.

His two brothers, Alfred and Edgar, died prematurely, with a stadium bearing the name of Alfred Wilkes in Le Havre for a long time. Charles divorced in 1928, and gave up the family business in Le Havre to spend his retirement pleasantly in a modest Breton port, where he had a small fisherman's house in Lanriot cove, a few meters from Port-Bélon, on the Moëlan-sur-Mer side, spending a lot of time there fishing for salmon. Wilkes died in Port-Bélon on 23 August 1939, at the age of 60, just five days before the Second World War began.

== Honours ==
Le Havre AC

- Coupe Manier:
  - Runner-up (1): 1897
- USFSA Football Championship
  - Champions (2): 1899 and 1900
  - Runner-up (1): 1901
- Challenge International du Nord:
  - Champions (1): 1900
