= Alfred Wilkes (footballer) =

English footballer

Personal information
- Date of birth: c. 1875
- Place of birth: Le Havre, France
- Date of death: unknown
- Position: Defender

Senior career*
Years	Team	Apps	(Gls)
1897–1905	Le Havre AC		
1905–1908	Le Havre Sports		

International career
1904	France (unofficial)	2	(0)
- * Club domestic league appearances and goals

Alfred Wilkes was a French footballer who played as a defender for Le Havre AC at the turn of the 20th century. His brother Charles also played football for Le Havre, and was a French international.

== Early life ==
Wilkes was born in Le Havre, as the eldest son of Edwin Villers Wilkes, an Englishman who settled in that port city after founding a company responsible for loading and unloading the many ships that operated in the Southampton-Le Havre shipping line. He had two younger brothers, Edgar and Charles, all born in Le Havre, and despite having English parents, they all chose French nationality since they all did their military service, which did not exist in the United Kingdom.

== Career ==
Wilkes began his football career in his hometown club, Le Havre AC, where the great majority of his teammates were English, such as Arthur Wood, Frank Mason, Richards, and William Taylor. In April 1897, the Wilkes brothers appeared in the HAC eleven that played the inaugural edition of Coupe Manier, which required clubs to field only three foreigners, so HAC had to use the French players of their second team, but thanks to the efforts of the Wilkes brothers, they managed to reach the final, which ended in a 3–4 loss to Club Français after extra-time.

On 19 February 1899, he started as a defender alongside his brother Charles (midfielder) in the semifinals of the 1899 USFSA Football Championship against Iris Club Lillois at the Parc des Princes, which only lasted 45 minutes due to organizational problems (0–0), and following the withdrawals of Lillois and then Club Français in the final, Le Havre was proclaimed the French champions, becoming the first club to do so without having played a single game. On 29 April 1900, the Wilkes brothers started in the final of the 1900 Challenge International du Nord against Club Français in Tourcoing, and even though one of the Wilkes left the field due to injury, Le Havre still won 3–2 after extra-time. The following week, on 6 May, both of them started in the 1900 USFSA Football Championship final against Club Français, helping their side to a 1–0 victory, thus achieving their third consecutive victory in finals, all against Club Français.

The following year, on 14 April, the Wilkes brothers started in the replay of the final of the 1901 USFSA Championship against Standard AC, which ended in a 6–1 loss. Le Havre was also a semifinalist in 1902 and 1903.

== Death ==
Alfred and his younger brother Edgar died prematurely, with a stadium bearing the name of Alfred Wilkes in Le Havre for a long time. (Note: During the First World War, Private Alfred Ernest Wilkes of the Royal Marines died on 26 October 1917, but that was a different person, whose parents were Alfred and Amelia Wilkes of Bromsgrove, Worcestershire.)

== Honours ==
Le Havre AC

- Coupe Manier:
  - Runner-up (1): 1897
- USFSA Football Championship
  - Champions (2): 1899 and 1900
  - Runner-up (1): 1901
- Challenge International du Nord:
  - Champions (1): 1900
