= Alfred Wilkes =

Alfred Wilkes may refer to:

- Alfred Wilkes (footballer) (c. 1875–?), French footballer
- Alfred Wilkes (cricketer) (1922–1998), Australian cricketer
