= Charles Wilkes (disambiguation) =

Charles Wilkes (1798–1877), American naval officer

Charles Wilkes may also refer to:

- Charles Wilkes (banker) (1764–1833), American banker
- Charles Wilkes (footballer), French footballer
