= 1897 USFSA Football Championship =

Tournament details
- Country: France
- Teams: 9

Final positions
- Champions: Standard Athletic Club (3rd title)
- Runners-up: The White Rovers

The 1897 USFSA Football Championship was the 4th staging of the USFSA Football Championship.

It was played on neutral grounds, in a league system with Standard Athletic Club being proclaimed champions of France after beating The White Rovers in a play-off title decider having finished level on 14 points.

== Table ==
| Pos | Team | Pld | W | D | L | GF | GA | GD | Pts | Qualification or relegation |
|---|---|---|---|---|---|---|---|---|---|---|
| 1 | Standard Athletic Club | 8 | 6 | 2 | 0 | 31 | 4 | +27 | 14 | Champion |
| 2 | The White Rovers | 8 | 7 | 0 | 1 | 33 | 8 | +25 | 14 | |
| 3 | Club Français | 8 | 5 | 2 | 1 | 19 | 10 | +9 | 12 | |
| 4 | Racing Club de France | 8 | 4 | 1 | 3 | 17 | 13 | +4 | 9 | |
| 5 | Paris Star | 8 | 4 | 0 | 4 | 15 | 24 | −9 | 8 | |
| 6 | United Sport Club | 8 | 3 | 1 | 4 | 11 | 18 | −7 | 7 | |
| 7 | Football Club de Levallois | 8 | 2 | 0 | 6 | 15 | 22 | −7 | 4 | |
| 8 | Cercle Pédestre Asnières | 8 | 1 | 0 | 7 | 12 | 32 | −20 | 2 | |
| 9 | United Athlétique du Premier Arrondissement | 8 | 1 | 0 | 7 | 0 | 22 | −22 | 2 | |

Source: 1897 USFSA

== Play-off ==
This championship was extremely competitive, in fact, it resulted in a draw as Standard AC and The White Rovers finished tied on 14 points, which meant that the title had to be decided in a playoff match that was held a few days later.

1897

| Standard AC | 3–2 Annulled | The White Rovers |
|---|---|---|
| | Report |

Standard AC beat White Rovers 3–2, but the result of that game was canceled and the game had to be replayed. Despite the second chance, however, Rovers did not show up to play this game, and Standard was proclaimed champions of France.

== Replay ==
1897

| Standard AC | Forfait | The White Rovers |
|---|---|---|
| | Report |

== Winner ==
1897 USFSA Football Championship
Standard AC
