= 1900 USFSA Football Championship =

Tournament details
- Country: France
- Dates: 15 April – 6 May
- Teams: 3

Final positions
- Champions: Le Havre AC (2nd title)
- Runners-up: Club français

Tournament statistics
- Matches played: 2
- Goals scored: 5 (2.5 per match)

The 1900 USFSA Football Championship was the 7th staging of the USFSA Football Championship. It was won by Le Havre AC, thus being crowned the champions of France in back-to-back years.

== Participants ==
Teams	Notes	Jersey colour
(Paris) Club Français	Champion of Paris	
US Tourcoing	Champion of the North	
(Normandy) Le Havre AC	Upper Normandy Champion	

== Tournament ==
=== Semifinals ===
On 15 April, Club Français was automatically qualified, while Le Havre defeated US Tourcoing by a score of 4–0, thus setting a final between Le Havre and Club Français at Bécon-les-Bruyères on 6 May.

=== Final ===
On 23 April 1900, Le Havre defeated Club Français in the final of the Challenge International du Nord in Tourcoing by a score of 3–2 after extra time. This final was held two weeks later, on 6 May, and the Le Havre team, composed mainly of British players, won again (1–0) to become French champions.

6 May 1900

Le Havre AC	1–0	Club Français
Richards Arthur Wood - A. Wilkes, Bacquart - C. Wilkes, Frank Mason, Henry Coulon - Richards, Teltow, J. Carré, Georges Dubreuil, William Taylor	Report	Huteau - Allemane, Bach - Lambert, Gaillard, F. Deslandes - Canelle, R. Deslandes, Peltier, Grandjean, M. Laisné

Referee: French

== Winner ==
1900 USFSA Football Championship
Le Havre AC (2nd title)
