= Neuilly Athletic Circle =

Defunct French football club founded in 1893 and based in Neuilly-sur-Seine

CA Neuilly
- Full name: Cercle Athlétique de Neuilly
- Founded: 1893
- Dissolved: 1896
- Ground: None
Home colours

The Cercle Athlétique de Neuilly (English: Neuilly Athletic Circle), commonly abbreviated as CA Neuilly, was a French football club established in 1893 and dissolved in 1896. Based in Neuilly-sur-Seine, a commune adjacent to Paris, the club was one of the earliest football teams in France.

Throughout its brief existence, the club underwent two name changes: it became the Stade de Neuilly in 1894 and later the Sporting Club de Neuilly (abbreviated as SC Neuilly) in 1895.

CA Neuilly holds a significant place in French football history. It participated in the inaugural three editions of the French Championship, organized by the Union des sociétés françaises de sports athlétiques (USFSA), the first formal football competition in France. However, it struggled to compete against the dominant teams of the era—Club Français, Standard Athletic Club, and the White Rovers. Despite its modest record, CA Neuilly achieved notable milestones: it was the first French football club officially recognized by a federation and took part in the first official match in French football history, losing to the White Rovers in the preliminary round of the 1894 French Championship.

The club ceased operations after just three years, though the reasons for its dissolution remain unclear. Much of its legacy is preserved through the writings of Georges Duhamel, a former player who authored a seminal book on the early days of football in France.

== History ==
=== Founding of the club (1893) ===
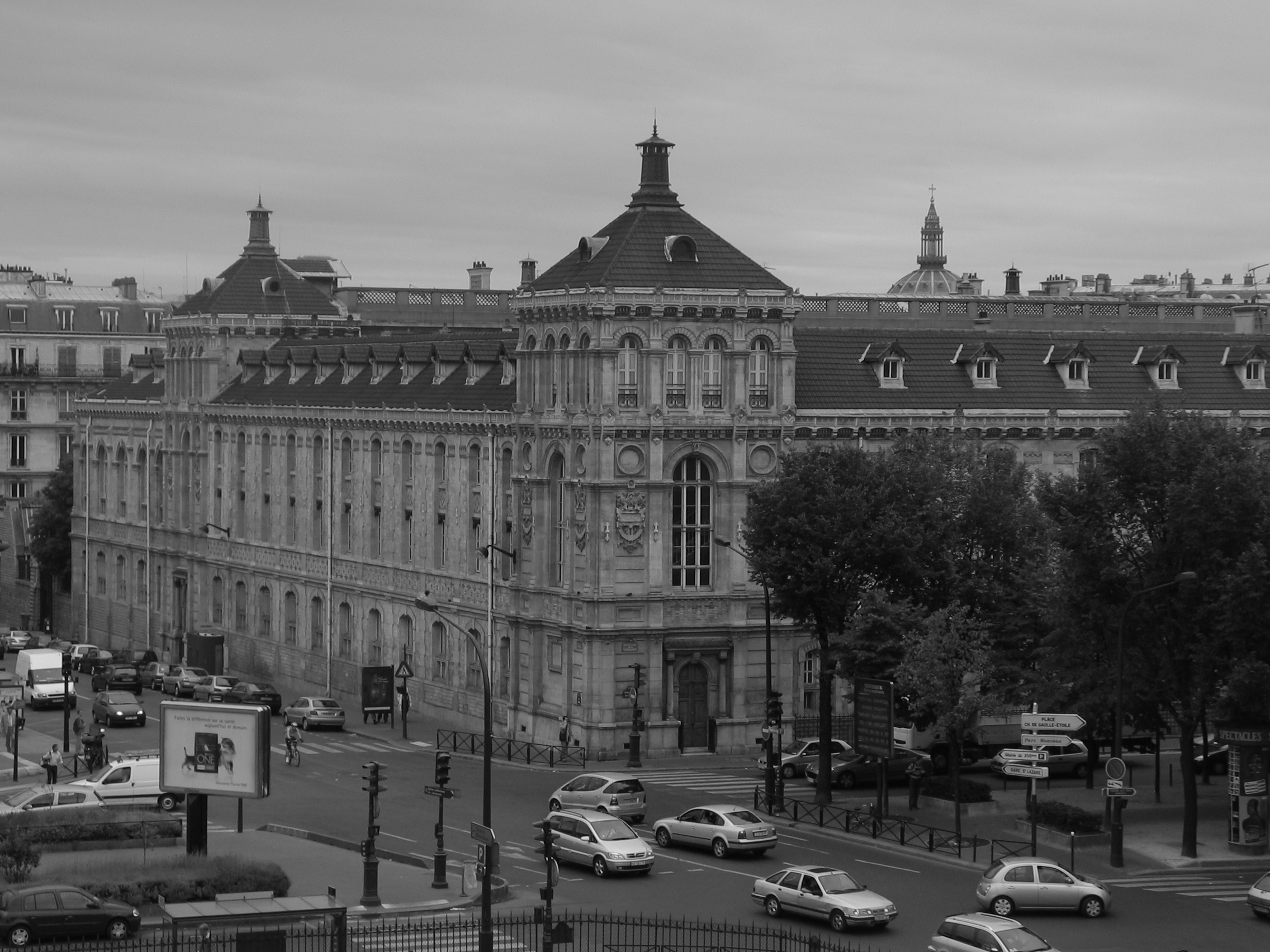
The club was founded by students of the Collège Chaptal in Paris.

In early 1893, students from the Lycée Chaptal in Paris founded one of France's earliest football clubs, initially naming it L'Étoile ("The Star"). The team set up on the Madrid lawn in the Bois de Boulogne, near the pitch of Club Français, the first club founded by French players in 1892. Club Français had also been established by students from Lycée Chaptal and the Lycée Janson-de-Sailly. L'Étoile naturally forged ties with Club Français and played just one match against another team, losing 4–0 to a secondary Club Français squad on the Ligue du Bois de Boulogne pitch.

At the end of the 1892–1893 season, the proximity between the two clubs led to L'Étoile's dissolution without a formal general assembly. Parisian members joined Club Français, while those from Neuilly-sur-Seine, Puteaux, and Courbevoie formed a new club, initially called Les Jeunes Athlètes ("The Young Athletes") before settling on Cercle Athlétique de Neuilly. The new club was promptly registered as an association. Its secretary, Georges Caizac, later served for four years as the football columnist for the official journal of the Union des sociétés françaises de sports athlétiques (USFSA) and co-managed its football section with Léon Augis. (Note: Like most clubs of the era, CA Neuilly was a multi-sport organization with an athletics section.)

=== Participation in the first French Championship (1893–1894) ===
At the start of the 1893–1894 season, although several football clubs existed in Paris, the USFSA initially hesitated to legitimize the sport. No clubs were affiliated with or recognized by the USFSA at that time. (Note: There were two categories of clubs: affiliated clubs, which paid an annual fee for a representative on the Union's council, and recognized clubs, which had no such representation.) CA Neuilly became the first to request recognition in late 1893. Facing the threat of an independent football league, the USFSA eventually acknowledged the sport and promised an official championship by season's end, managed by its Rugby Commission.

Due to these delays, the first interclub match of the season occurred on 24 December 1893. At the Bécon field in Courbevoie, CA Neuilly drew 1–1 against a reserve team from the Standard Athletic Club. A rematch on 3 February 1894 saw Standard win 3–0. (Note: The USFSA's official journal reported: "At Bécon, a strong wind hampered the players. Some good passes from Standard's forwards briefly threatened CA Neuilly's goal. After the restart, with the wind now blowing sideways, many CA Neuilly players faltered. Despite solid defending from backs Hutin and Caizac (captain) and goalkeeper Faucher, Standard scored twice. Notable charges came from Andraud, Meslin, and Bauchamp. For Standard, Howardson and Tunmer's intelligent play stood out, as did kicks from back Attril and goalkeeper Wynn. The match ended 3–0 to Standard.") Three weeks later, CA Neuilly secured its first victory, defeating the International Athletic Club 2-0 in the Bois de Boulogne.

The first French Football Championship, contested in a knockout format, began in April 1894, with only six clubs participating. Two clubs received byes, and with International AC forfeiting to Standard AC, the first round featured a single match: CA Neuilly versus the favored White Rovers. In the first official match in French football history, White Rovers crushed CA Neuilly 13–0 at Bécon. Georges Duhamel, a CA Neuilly player and author of Le football français: ses débuts, a detailed account of French football from 1890 to 1895, missed this match due to illness, confined indoors by his mother.

=== Name change and second French Championship (1894–1895) ===
Key locations frequented by club members.

CA Neuilly continued training in the Bois de Boulogne during the summer of 1894. Georges Duhamel noted that while the team "began to develop some technique, tactics remained entirely absent". The club had to transport its goalposts from a shed owned by a player's father on Rue de l'Hôtel de Ville in Neuilly-sur-Seine to the Terrain du Tir aux Pigeons, a nearly two-kilometer journey. In July, the players purchased a dozen sky-blue shirts with black sleeves and collars as the club's colors and renamed the club Stade de Neuilly. Yet, among Paris's seven active football clubs, Stade de Neuilly remained the only one without a dedicated pitch.

The 1894–1895 season saw frequent matches between clubs. Stade de Neuilly faced the Standard Athletic Club three Sundays in a row at the Seine Velodrome, conceding 12 to 23 goals each time. While acknowledging their inferiority to the "Big Three"—Standard AC, Club Français, and the White Rovers, dubbed the "Ace Group"—the club aimed to defeat the other three teams, resulting in close, competitive matches. Key players included Georges Caizac, M. Faucher, brothers Gaston and Georges Duhamel, and M. Howatson, a Scotsman playing as "Stevens" because his father forbade Sunday play, the Lord's Day. (Note: Matches were routinely held on Sunday afternoons at the time.) In October 1894, the USFSA formed a dedicated Football Commission, including Stade de Neuilly's Georges Caizac. In January 1895, the Union's Council appointed official referees for a year, including three Stade de Neuilly players: Georges Caizac, M. Chapelle, and Gaston Duhamel.

Eight teams entered the 1895 French Championship, still a knockout tournament with seeded teams—Standard AC, Club Français, and White Rovers naturally topping the list. Georges Caizac, club secretary and Football Commission member, secured Stade de Neuilly the fourth seed, a move Duhamel later admitted involved "scheming and favoritism". (Note: In his book, Duhamel acknowledged this as a "ploy and favoritism.") On 10 March 1895, Stade de Neuilly faced Cercle Pédestre d’Asnières in the quarter-finals at the Seine Velodrome, following Standard AC's match against the United Sports Club. With darkness falling, the game ended 1–1. Referee Neville Tunmer, a Standard player, called for sudden-death extra time, which Stade de Neuilly won. Asnières lodged a valid protest since sudden-death rules didn't exist, but the Football Commission—including Tunmer—upheld the result. (Note: Duhamel conceded the protest was "perfectly justified.") The following week, Standard AC predictably thrashed Stade de Neuilly 18–0 in the semi-finals, with six Neuilly players fatigued from competing in the French Cross Country Championship (17 kilometres (11 mi)) that morning.

=== Final name change and dissolution (1895–1896) ===
At the start of the 1895–1896 season, the club renamed itself Sporting Club de Neuilly. Unlike its peers, SC Neuilly still lacked a fixed pitch. In October 1895, a new Football Commission was appointed without SC Neuilly's representation. The 1895–1896 French Championship adopted a league format with nine Parisian clubs. SC Neuilly finished seventh, predictably losing to the "Ace Group" but managing a mixed record of two wins, one draw, and two losses against the other five teams.

During the season, SC Neuilly played two Franco-Belgian international matches. On 6 March 1896, they traveled to Bruges and defeated Football Club Brugeois 2–1. On 6 April 1896, they lost 1–0 to Racing Club de Bruxelles at Place Collange in Levallois-Perret.

After three years, Sporting Club de Neuilly disbanded at the end of the 1895–1896 season. (Note: Duhamel provides no explicit reason for the dissolution. However, the lack of a dedicated pitch likely influenced players to join other clubs. Georges Duhamel, for instance, moved to Paris Star, which played at Reuilly in the Bois de Vincennes. Meanwhile, a new sports club emerged in Neuilly-sur-Seine based on SC Neuilly, focusing on cycling and excluding football.)

== Sporting record ==
=== Honours ===
The club won no major titles. Its best achievement was reaching the semi-finals of the 1895 French Championship.

=== Season-by-season record ===
The following table details CA Neuilly's performance over its three seasons, with only three victories in eleven official matches.

Season-by-season record of CA Neuilly
Season	Championship	Div.	Pos.	Pts	Pld	W	D	L	GF	GA	GD
1893–1894	French Championship	–	R1	–	1	0	0	1	0	13	−13
1894–1895	French Championship	–	SF	–	2	1	0	1	2	19	−17
1895–1896	French Championship	–	7th / 9	5	8	2	1	5	10	11	−1
Total					11	3	1	7	12	43	−31

== See also ==
- Club Français

== Bibliography ==
- Duhamel, Georges (1959). Le football français : ses débuts [French Football: Its Beginnings]. Angoulême: Imprimerie de la Charente. p. 80.
- Sorez, Julien (2013). Le football dans Paris et ses banlieues : Un sport devenu spectacle [Football in Paris and Its Suburbs: A Sport Turned Spectacle]. Histoire. Rennes: Presses universitaires de Rennes. p. 410. ISBN 978-2-7535-2643-3.
