= 1928–29 French Amateur Football Championship =

Statistics of the French Amateur Football Championship in the 1928–29 season.

== Excellence Division ==
=== Final ===
- Olympique de Marseille 3 – 2 Club Français

== Honour Division ==
Won by US Cazérienne.
