= The White Rovers =

Football club in France active between 1891 and 1899

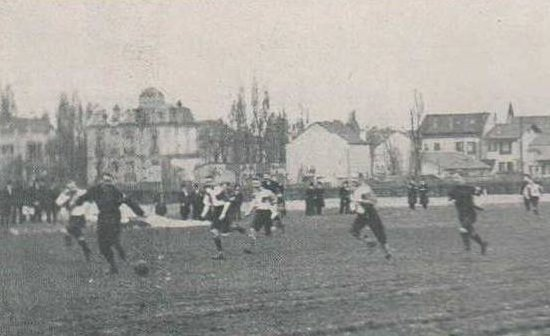
- The White Rovers playing against an unofficial Germany national team.
- Full name: White Rovers Football Club
- Nickname: The Rovers
- Short name: White Rovers
- Founded: November 1891; 131 years ago.
- Dissolved: 1899
- Ground: Terrain de Bécon
Home colours

The White Rovers, also known as White Rovers Paris, was a French amateur football club based in Paris which existed between 1891 and 1899. The club was founded in 1891 by Englishman Jack Wood, who had formerly played football in his home country. White Rovers primarily used Anglo-American football players, but was open to all nationalities. The club held its home matches on land opposite the commune of Bécon-les-Bruyères and later played matches in Bois de Vincennes.

White Rovers are best remembered for their pioneering role in the amateur beginnings of football in France, being one of the six football clubs that participated in France's first-ever football championship in 1894. Despite being considered the best team in Paris at the time, the White Rovers never managed to win the championship, finishing as runners-up four times in a row between 1894 and 1897, behind the Standard Athletic Club and Club Français. The club subsequently declined after struggling to attract players. After two further seasons without competing for the title, the club was dissolved in 1899.

White Rovers featured in many historic French football firsts. They were involved in the first interclub match in 1892 against the International Athletic Club; the first international interclub match in 1893 against England's Marylebone Football Club; the first official match against the Cercle athlétique de Neuilly on 15 April 1894, winning 13–0. Despite the club's very short life, they left a considerable mark in the history of French football.

== History ==
=== Origins ===
Paris was introduced to football around 1890, thanks to the British colony that worked and lived there (and later through the French returning from studying abroad), among whom a certain Jack Wood stood out, a Briton who had previously played amateur football in his home country. So when he arrived to work in Paris in 1891, one of his first thoughts was to organize games of football in his new home, since at the time football was a sport practically unknown in the French capital. On 30 October 1891, Jak Wood and his brother Tom, together with other football pioneers in the city, mostly of British and American nationality, met at the Café Français on rue Pasquier in Paris, where they voted narrowly to play association football rather than rugby rules, thus founding the first football club in Paris, the White Rovers Football Club. The entity's Board was subsequently elected, appointing for secretary Mr. Pullard, who works at Galignani's Messenger, whose head office located at 224 rue de Rivoli also serves as the headquarters of the White Rovers, and for treasurer William Sleator, a Worcestershire youth who is widely regarded as one of the “fathers of football in France”, having organized the first known football match in Paris in the winter of 1890–91, and having also imported the first set of goalposts to France. Some of the remaining members were Emile Ernest Cox, Walter Hewson, a tailor, Edward Barclay, a lawyer born in London, and Claude Rivaz, an artist, who like Barclay is said to have gone to Westminster School and had, whilst previously living in Belgium, played for Royal Antwerp, aged between 14 and 18.

The founding of the club was announced on 7 November in Les Sports athlétiques, the journal of the Union des Sociétés Françaises de Sports Athlétiques (USFSA). Even though the club was open to all nationalities, on the sole condition of using words English, the Rovers were mostly made up of Britons and Americans. The club's first-ever rival was a certain Gordon F.C., seemingly also made up of Scots like McBain and McQueen. Both clubs were still in its infancy and facing numerous difficulties, so they agreed to merge. The large number of British players in their workforce implemented the known lawns of Oxford or Cambridge within the club to perfect their art of the ball. Playing in white shirts with a large blue Maltese cross, the Rovers (or Routiers in French) were based in the Paris suburb of Courbevoie, near the railway station at Bécon-les-Bruyères in the northwest of Paris, where they were granted the use of a ground nearby thanks to a director of the railway company called Henry Blount, son of the British Consul and a well-known socialite, who became the club's patron.

On 2 March 1892, White Rovers played its first match against another club, the International Athletic Club, nickname Inter-Nos, which was held at Bécon, with Rovers winning by a large margin of ten goals to one. This was also the very first interclub match played in France, because until then, all those who practiced football did so within a club, in a kind of training match. This resouding defeated brought waves of departure for International AC, including that of Louis Cotton, the captain of the team, who joined the club's first rival, the White Rovers, with whom he would experience much more success. At the end of 1892, three clubs coexisted in Paris,Standard Athletic Club and Club Français, and naturally, a rivalry between them quickly developed, meeting up regularly during the 1892–93 season. On 11 December 1892, the White Rovers played against Standard AC for the first time, winning 5–1, and then they Club Français for the first time in Bécon on 8 January 1893 and also won (3–2). Initially, the Rovers had no French opponent to fear, and in fact, after their thumping victory over International AC in March 1892, and wins over Standard AC and Club Français in 1892–93, the White Rovers continued their series of victories by beating Standard AC once again on 22 January by 3–0, and again on 11 March, on Standard AC's ground located at Porte Dauphine (2–0).

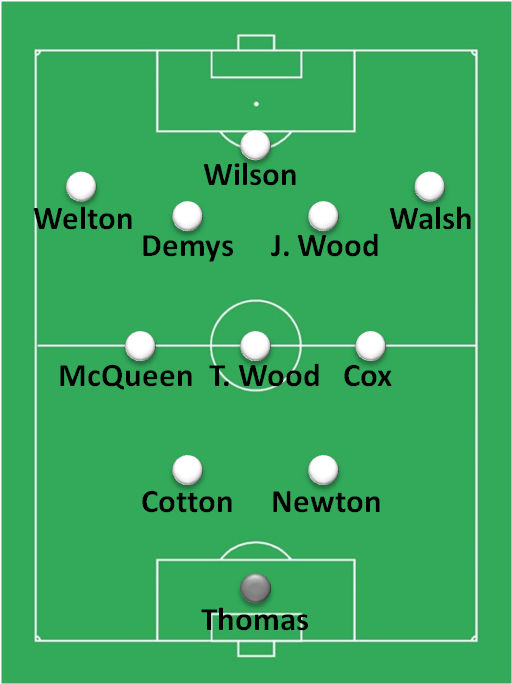
The line-up of White Rovers on 2 April 1893, in the first international club game on French soil against Marylebone FC.

Links are then forged between the three clubs. White Rovers and Standard AC organize evenings where players from other clubs are invited, near Saint-Lazare station for Rovers. Rovers introduced an international element to football in Paris when in 1893, in search of new adversaries, they turned to England and managed to bring a London team to Paris, Marylebone Football Club, for the Easter holidays of 1893. On 1 April, Marylebone FC beat a Paris selection made of players from White Rovers, Standard AC and Club Français by three goals to nil. The next day sees the first international club game on French soil between White Rovers and Marylebone FC, with the Londoners beating the Parisians by four goals to one at Bécon in the White Rovers' final game of the season. Because of this, Paris soon became a popular Easter tour destination for English clubs.

=== Participation in the first French championship (1893–94) ===
Even though a few football clubs existed in Paris at the start of the 1893–94 season, the USFSA did not initially legitimize the sport, fearing something similar to what happened in Great Britain, where football had already adopted professionalism, would occur, so no club is thus affiliated with or recognized by the USFSA. On 9 January 1894, however, fearing that football would develop outside of it and beyond its control, the USFSA created a commission responsible for the organizing and management of association football, and on that same day the White Rovers were finally admitted by the USFSA, more than two years after their founding.

Also in 1894, the White Rovers took part in its first national championship in France, although still limited to Paris and its environs. After an 11–0 win over CA Neuilly and a surprisingly meager 1–0 win against Club Français, scoring fifteen minutes from the end of the match by Mac Bain, on a corner kick taken by Jack Wood, slightly helped by the wind. They met Standard AC in the final on 29 April 1894, and given their invictus status, Rovers were considered the favourites, but for the first time there were unable to beat domestic opponents, ending in a 2–2 draw after extra-time, so the two clubs agreed to play a replay on 5 May. There were ten Englishmen and one Frenchman on the field in each of the two teams, and this time the game ended with a 0–2 defeat.

=== Back-to-back runner-up finished ===
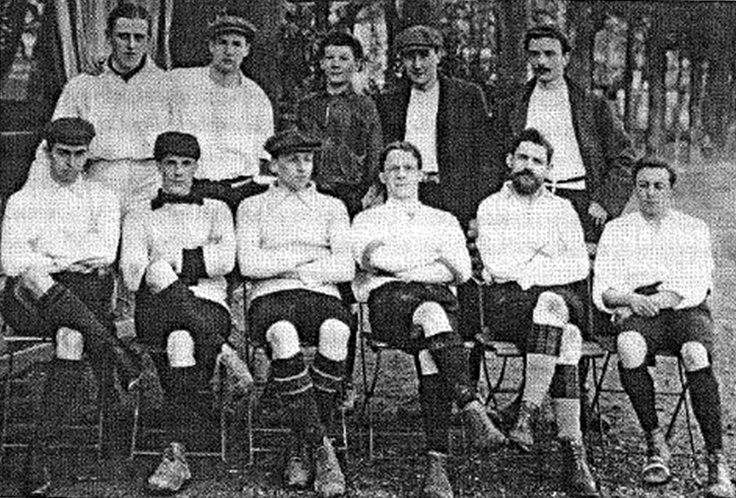
The White Rovers team in 1895.

In the 1895 USFSA Football Championship, White Rovers qualified again for the final after victories over Paris Star (8–1) and Club Français (2–1 after extra time). In the final, however, they lost to Standard AC again by a score of 1–3.

From 1896 onwards, the championship was held in a simple round of points, still restricted to the Paris region. The Rovers won seven of their eight matches, achieving a goal difference of 35–2, losing only to Club Français (1–4), thus finishing with the silver medal for the third time in a row. A year later, the Routiers ended up level on points with Standard AC at the top of the table, and since goal difference was not a thing at the time, the two teams played a play-off to decide the title. The White Rovers had beat Standard AC in the league game, but in the championship, they had to settle for another defeat (2–3) and were left empty-handed for the fourth time in a row.

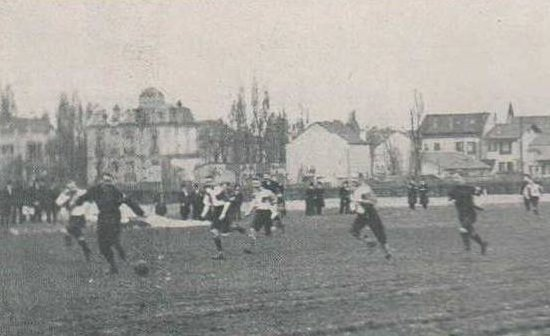
The White Rovers playing against an unofficial Germany national team.

On 12 December 1898, White Rovers lost to a German selection in Paris (0–7), a historic meeting since this encounter marked the first of the so-called German Ur-Internationals. In front of a large audience, Germany, judged as "one of the strongest foreign teams that have come to France", easily won by seven goals to nil against the White Rovers, an event of which there remains a photograph published in Le Sport universelle illustré.

=== Decline and Collapse ===
By 1898, several players had meanwhile returned to Great Britain or the US, so the club began to decline and ended up with 0–30 goals and 0–20 points in last place in the top Parisian league. Due to his tradition and successes, he still did not have to be relegated, but he failed to assemble a team in 1899 and broke up in the same year.

== Notable players ==
- Jack Wood: Founder and Captain. The undisputed leader and main driving force behind the foundations of the club.
- Robert James MacQueen: One of the team's best players.
