= 1894 USFSA Football Championship =

Tournament details
- Country: France
- Dates: 15 April – 6 May
- Teams: 6

Final positions
- Champions: Standard Athletic Club (1st title)
- Runners-up: The White Rovers

Tournament statistics
- Matches played: 5
- Goals scored: 25 (5 per match)

The 1894 USFSA Football Championship was the 1st staging of the USFSA Football Championship. This was the very first recognized football championship to be played in France. The tournament was held on the road between 15 April and 6 May 1894.

The first competition featured just four Paris teams and was organized on a knockout basis with Standard Athletic Club becoming the French champions after beating The White Rovers 2–2 and 2–0 in the replay of the final.

== Participants ==
The first national championship in team sports in France was the high schools rugby football championship in 1891. Its success prompted the Parisian clubs to start a championship for football as well. So, in 1894, it was decided to hold a "championship" among the volunteering football clubs of the U.S.F.S.A. The tournament gathered six teams, of which 4 were clubs from Paris, thus making it seem more of a championship of Paris rather than a French championship.

Teams	Town
Standard Athletic Club	Paris
International Athletic Club	Paris
White Rovers	Paris
Cercle athlétique de Neuilly	Neuilly-sur-Seine
Club Français	Paris
Cercle pédestre d'Asnières	Asnières-sur-Seine

== Format ==
The competition was played under a knockout cup system. Four clubs, Standard AC, International AC, White Rovers and CA Neuilly took part in a preliminary round, while Club Français and Cercle Pédestre d'Asnières received a bye to the semi-finals. All the matches took place on the Racing Club de France grounds in Levallois. The donator of the trophy was a wealthy sports-loving American businessman, James Gordon Bennett.

== Bracket ==
First round
CP Asnières
bye
15 April 1894 – Bécon-les-Bruyères
Standard AC	Forfeit
International AC
Club Français
bye
15 April 1894 – Bécon-les-Bruyères
White Rovers	13
CA Neuilly	0

Semi-finals
22 April 1894 – Bécon-les-Bruyères
Standard AC	5
CP Asnières	0
22 April 1894 – Bécon-les-Bruyères
White Rovers	1
Club Français	0

#Final
29 April and 6 May 1894 – Bécon-les-Bruyères
Standard AC	2 (2)
White Rovers	2 (0)

== Results ==
=== First round ===
Bye (2):

CP Asnières
Club Français

15 April 1899

Standard AC	Forfeit	International Athletic Club
	Report

Racing Club's ground, Bécon-les-Bruyères

Note: At the last moment, the International AC withdrew, without the reason being known.

15 April 1894
16:30

The White Rovers	13–0	Cercle Athlétique de Neuilly
	Report

Racing Club's ground, Bécon-les-Bruyères
Referee: Neek

=== Semi-finals ===
22 April 1894

Standard AC	5–0	CP Asnières
	Report

Racing Club's ground, Bécon-les-Bruyères
Referee: Sleator
22 April 1900

The White Rovers	1–0	Club Français
Mac Bain 75'	Report

Racing Club's ground, Bécon-les-Bruyères
Referee: Georges Caizac

Note: Rovers were "not expecting so much resistance", but end up scoring fifteen minutes from the end of the match by Mac Bain, on a corner kick taken by J. Wood, slightly helped by the wind.

=== Final ===
29 April 1894

Standard AC	2–2	The White Rovers
N. Tunmer; A. Tunmer	Report	J. Wood; Roscoe

Racing Club's ground, Bécon-les-Bruyères
Referee: Daumay (Club Français)

=== Replay ===
6 May 1894

Standard AC	2–0	The White Rovers
Hunter 35'; Vines 88'	Report

Racing Club's ground, Bécon-les-Bruyères
Referee: Daumay (Club Français)

== Winner ==
1894 USFSA Football Championship
Standard AC
