= 1895 USFSA Football Championship =

Tournament details
- Country: France
- Dates: 3 – 24 March
- Teams: 8

Final positions
- Champions: Standard Athletic Club (2nd title)
- Runner-up: The White Rovers

Tournament statistics
- Matches played: 7
- Goals scored: 61 (8.71 per match)

The 1895 USFSA Football Championship was the 2nd staging of the USFSA Football Championship.

== Participants ==
Teams	Town
Standard Athletic Club	Paris
Stade de Neuilly	Neuilly-sur-Seine
White Rovers	Paris
Paris Star	Paris
Club Français	Paris
Cercle pédestre d'Asnières	Asnières-sur-Seine
FC Levallois	Levallois-Perret
United Sports Club	Paris

== Bracket ==
First round
3 March 1895 –
The White Rovers	8
Paris Star	1
3 March 1895 –
Club Français	11
FC Levallois	0
10 March 1895 –
Standard AC	13
United Sports Club	0
10 March 1895 –
Stade de Neuilly (a.e.t.)	2
CP Asnières	1

Semi-finals
17 March 1895 –
The White Rovers (a.e.t.)	2
Club Français	1
17 March 1895 –
Standard AC	18
Stade de Neuilly	0

#Final
24 March 1895 –
Standard AC	3
The White Rovers	1

== Tournament ==
=== Quarterfinals ===
- Club Français 5–0 FC Levallois
- The White Rovers 8–1 Paris Star
- Stade de Neuilly 2–1 CP Asnières
- Standard AC 13–0 United Sports Club

The match between Stade de Neuilly and CP d'Asnières saw one of the earliest demonstrations of sudden death, since the game was stopped in extra-time by referee N. Tunmer (a member of Standard AC) right after Neuilly's goal due to darkness. The Asnières club complained to the USFSA commission, but the result remained unchanged.

=== Semifinals ===
- Standard AC 18–0 Stade de Neuilly
- The White Rovers 2–1 Club Français

=== Final ===
- Standard AC 3–1 The White Rovers
