= 1901 USFSA Football Championship =

The 1901 USFSA Football Championship was won by Standard AC, which defeated Le Havre Athletic Club Football Association 6–1 in a replay of the final after the original match ended in a 1–1 draw. Le Havre had reached the final by defeating Iris Club Lillois 6–1 in the semifinal.

== Tournament ==
=== Semifinals ===
- Le Havre Athletic Club Football Association 6–1 Iris Club Lillois

=== Final ===
- Standard AC 1–1 Le Havre Athletic Club Football Association (match replayed)
- Standard AC 6–1 Le Havre Athletic Club Football Association
