= Standard Athletic Club =

Multisports club in France

- Full name: Standard Athletic Club
- Founded: 1 March 1890; 136 years ago
- Based in: Meudon, France
- Colours: Red Black
- President: Richard Parkin
- Website: www.saclub.org

Standard Athletic Club is a British multisports club and social club in Paris, created on 1 March 1890. Standard A.C. is the fourth association football club in France, the oldest one being Le Havre AC. The Standard A.C. won the first French football championship in 1894, and then again in 1895, 1897, 1898 and 1901. It also represented France for the one and only cricket match in the Olympic Games.

== History ==
The club was founded on 1 March 1890, in the back-room of the "Horse shoe" bar at rue Copernic in the 8th arrondissement. The club won the first ever Football Championship of France in 1894 and supplied most of the French team that played the only cricket match ever to be held in an Olympiad, at the Paris 1900 Olympic Games. Up to the war, the main sporting activities were association football, tennis, field hockey, and cricket. The hockey teams played in the National First Division.

In its early days, the club was simply a loose association of young Britons who wanted to play sport together in the bois de Boulogne, but gradually grew to a size where playing fields were rented in 1906 at the Val d’Or in Suresnes. In 1922, the historic decision to ensure a permanent home for the Club led to the purchase of the present grounds in Meudon. During World War II, the club was taken over and used as a radar jamming station. Just prior to the Liberation of Paris in 1944, the entire top storey was blown up. The new clubhouse was inaugurated by Queen Elizabeth II in 1957 and 1972.

The swimming pool was opened in 1962; the golf section made its debut in 1979; and the first squash court was built in 1976. A Standard A.C. member was the first squash champion of France.

== Departments ==
The club offers the following sports:

- Association football
- Competitive swimming
- Contract bridge
- Cricket
- Fitness training
- Golf
- Snooker
- Squash
- Taekwondo
- Tennis
- Yoga

== Honours ==
- French USFSA Champions (5): 1893–94, 1894–95, 1896–97, 1897–98, 1900–01
- Founding participant (1 of 32) of Coupe de France in 1917–18.
