= Football at the Inter-Allied Games – Men's team squads =

The following squads were named for the 1919 Inter-Allied tournament.

== Group A ==
=== France ===
Head coach:

No.	Pos.	Player	Date of birth (age)	Caps	Club
	GK	Pierre Chayriguès	2 May 1892 (aged 27)	11	(France) Red Star
	MF	Lucien Gamblin	22 July 1890 (aged 28)	7	(France) Red Star
	DF	Eugène Langenove	12 August 1899 (aged 19)	0	
	DF	Marcel Vignoli	3 November 1898 (aged 20)	0	
	MF	François Hugues	13 August 1896 (aged 22)	1	(France) Red Star
	FW	Maurice Gastiger	3 October 1896 (aged 22)	2	(France) FEC Levallois
	MF	Pierre Gastiger	28 February 1892 (aged 27)	0	
	MF	Émilien Devic	16 November 1888 (aged 30)	6	(France) Racing Club
	MF	Maurice Gravelines	17 July 1891 (aged 27)	0	(France) Olympique Lillois
	FW	Henri Lesur	25 October 1892 (aged 26)	6	
	FW	Raymond Dubly	5 November 1893 (aged 25)	7	(France) RC Roubaix
	FW	Paul Deydier		0	(France) CASG Paris
	FW	Paul Nicolas	4 November 1899 (aged 19)	0	(France) Red Star
	FW	Antoine Rouchès	21 May 1893 (aged 26)	0	
	FW	Albert Rénier	8 May 1896 (aged 23)	0	(France) Le Havre AC
	MF	René Petit	8 October 1899 (aged 19)	0	(France) Stade Bordelais
		... Clugnet		?	
		... Devicq		?	
		... Douchet		?	
		... Lannaud		?	
		... Leclerc		?	
		... Stuyler		?	

=== Greece ===
Head coach:

No.	Pos.	Player	Date of birth (age)	Caps	Club
	FW	Giorgos Kalafatis	17 March 1890 (aged 29)	0	(Greece) P.P.A.O.
		Georgios Protopoulos		0	(Greece) Goudi Athens
	FW	Georgios Chatziandreou	0 December 1899 (aged 19–20)	0	(Greece) Peiraikos Syndesmos
	FW	Ioannis Stavropoulos		0	(Greece) Piraiki Enosis
	GK	Dimítris Demertzís		0	(Greece) P.P.A.O.
		Dimitris Kastritsis		0	(Greece) P.P.A.O.
		Vaggelis Kourentis		0	(Greece) Peiraikos Syndesmos
		Georgios Demertzis		0	(Greece) P.P.A.O.
		Manolis Isaias		0	(Greece) Goudi Athens
	DF	Agamemnon Gilis	0 December 1891 (aged 27–28)	0	(Greece) P.P.A.O.
	MF	Loukas Panourgias	4 September 1899 (aged 19)	0	(Greece) P.P.A.O.
		Alekos Papathanasiou		0	(Greece) P.P.A.O.
		Petros Saridakis		0	(Greece) Iraklis
		Iosif Terzakis		0	(Greece) Peiraikos Syndesmos
		Leonidas Traganos		0	(Greece) Goudi Athens
		Georgios Vlachopoulos		0	(Greece) P.P.A.O.
		Spyros Kotrotsos		0	(Greece) Aris
		Vrasidas Vranopoulos		0	(Greece) Goudi Athens

=== Italy ===
Head coach:

No.	Pos.	Player	Date of birth (age)	Caps	Club
	GK	Giuseppe Trivellini	26 September 1895 (aged 23)	1	(Italy) Brescia
	DF	Renzo De Vecchi	3 February 1894 (aged 25)	17	(Italy) Genoa
	DF	Angelo Binaschi	15 January 1889 (aged 30)	9	(Italy) Pro Vercelli
	DF	Carlo Capra	21 September 1889 (aged 29)	1	(Italy) Torino
	MF	Guido Ara	28 August 1888 (aged 30)	10	(Italy) Pro Vercelli
	MF	Pietro Leone	31 January 1888 (aged 31)	9	(Italy) Pro Vercelli
	MF	Giuseppe Parodi	17 December 1892 (aged 26)	2	(Italy) Pro Vercelli
	FW	Ermanno Aebi	13 January 1892 (aged 27)	0	(Italy) Internazionale
	FW	Italo Rossi	5 May 1898 (aged 21)	0	(Italy) Legnano
	FW	Silvio Raso	14 March 1893 (aged 26)	0	(Italy) Legnano
	FW	Aristodemo Santamaria	9 February 1892 (aged 27)	1	(Italy) Genoa
	FW	Luigi Cevenini	13 March 1895 (aged 24)	1	(Italy) AC Milan
	FW	Enrico Sardi	1 April 1891 (aged 28)	3	(Italy) Genoa
		Agusto Bergamini		?	
		Carlo Carcano		?	
		Felia Terzi		?	
	FW	Giuseppe Asti (not named in the original source, but apparently a part of the squad)	31 July 1891 (aged 27)	0	(Italy) Internazionale

=== Romania ===
Head coach:

No.	Pos.	Player	Date of birth (age)	Caps	Club
	GK	(Romania) Constantin Rădulescu	5 October 1896 (aged 22)	0	(Romania) Olympia București
	FW	(Romania) Theodor Davila	1 January 1888 (aged 31)	0	(Romania) Olympia București
		(Romania) Țane Săvulescu		0	
		(Romania) Dumitriu Niculescu		0	(Romania) Venus București
	FW	(England) Ernest Hillard		0	(Romania) Tricolor București
		(Romania) Constantin Georgescu		0	(Romania) Tricolor București
	DF	(Romania) Teodor Florian	1 July 1899 (aged 19)	0	
		(Romania) Gheorghe Țicleanu		0	
	MF	(Romania) George Vraca	25 November 1896 (aged 22)	0	(Romania) Olympia București
		(Romania) Virgil Economu	21 November 1896 (aged 22)	0	
		(Romania) Eugen Mețianu		0	
		(Romania) Constantin Alvirescu		0	
		(Romania) Vasile Ginița		0	
		(Romania) Dumitru Maiorescu		0	
		(Romania) Savu Mareș		0	
		(Romania) Horia Roman		0	(Romania) Olympia București
	DF	(Romania) Nicolae Sacăreanu		0	(Romania) Colțea București
	FW	(Romania) Trăian Buțu		0	(Romania) Colțea București
		(Germany) Rudy Schmettau		0	

== Group B ==
=== Belgium ===
Head coach:

No.	Pos.	Player	Date of birth (age)	Caps	Club
	MF	Félix Balyu	5 August 1891 (aged 27)	0	(Belgium) Club Brugge
	GK	Roger Fischlin	3 July 1893 (aged 25)	0	
	DF	Jacques Pirlot	7 June 1896 (aged 23)	0	
	MF	Auguste Fierens	14 July 1892 (aged 26)	0	(Belgium) Beerschot AC
	MF	Jacques Vandevelde	21 March 1895 (aged 24)	0	(Belgium) K. Lyra
	FW	Honoré Vlamynck	29 January 1897 (aged 22)	1	(Belgium) Daring Club
		Joseph Cuppens		?	
		George Deman		?	
		Joseph Demol		?	
	MF	Émile Hanse	10 August 1892 (aged 26)	0	(Belgium) Union St. Gilloise
		Jules P. Michel		?	
	MF	... Van Der Cloot		?	
	FW	Georges Michel	29 April 1898 (aged 21)	1	(Belgium) Léopold Football Club
		... Van Der Gracht		?	
		Aug. Van Der Straeten		?	
		Louis Verstraeten		?	
	DF	Armand Swartenbroeks	30 June 1892 (aged 26)	8	(Belgium) Daring Club
	DF	Oscar Verbeeck	6 June 1891 (aged 28)	2	(Belgium) Union St. Gilloise
	FW	Fernand Wertz	29 January 1894 (aged 25)	4	(Belgium) Royal Antwerp

=== Canada ===
Head coach:

No.	Pos.	Player	Date of birth (age)	Caps	Club
		William Bayley	30 September 1884 (aged 34)	0	
		Duncan Brewster	10 June 1893 (aged 26)	0	
		Stephen Duncan	1 June 1893 (aged 26)	0	
		Samuel Gough	16 March 1897 (aged 22)	0	
		Charles Hitchens (captain)	4 September 1891 (aged 27)	0	
		Samuel Horne	14 October 1892 (aged 26)	0	
		Charles Hutchinson	10 February 1892 (aged 27)	0	
	GK	Thomas Kyle	2 January 1892 (aged 27)	0	
		Samuel Magill	10 January 1892 (aged 27)	0	
		Archibald Marr	26 October 1890 (aged 28)	0	
	FW	Boyd Mayson	31 March 1892 (aged 27)	0	
	FW	Alf Spouncer	1 July 1878 (aged 40)	1	
	FW	Douglas Thomson	10 August 1891 (aged 27)	0	(England) Millwall
		John Willis	18 April 1881 (aged 38)	0	
		A. Allan		0	
		S. McGee		0	
		... McKay		0	
		J. Richards		0	
		G. Taylor		0	

=== Czechoslovakia ===
Head coach: John Madden (Scotland)

No.	Pos.	Player	Date of birth (age)	Caps	Club
	DF	Antonín Hojer	13 March 1894 (aged 25)	0	(Czechoslovakia) AC Sparta Prague
	FW	Antonín Janda	21 September 1892 (aged 26)	0	(Czechoslovakia) AC Sparta Prague
	GK	Rudolf Klapka	24 February 1885 (aged 34)	0	(Czechoslovakia) SK Viktoria Žižkov
	DF	Antonin Raca	18 June 1893 (aged 26)	0	(Czechoslovakia) SK Slavia Prague
	MF	Antonín Fivebr	22 November 1888 (aged 30)	0	(Czechoslovakia) AC Sparta Prague
	MF	Jaroslav Cerveny	1 June 1895 (aged 24)	0	(Czechoslovakia) AC Sparta Prague
	GK	František Peyr	5 August 1896 (aged 22)	0	(Czechoslovakia) AC Sparta Prague
	FW	Václav Pilát	6 May 1888 (aged 31)	0	(Czechoslovakia) AC Sparta Prague
		Valentin Loos	13 April 1895 (aged 24)	0	(Czechoslovakia) HC Slavia Praha
	DF	Miroslav Pospíšil	27 September 1890 (aged 28)	0	(Czechoslovakia) AC Sparta Prague
	FW	Josef Sedláček	15 December 1893 (aged 25)	1	(Czechoslovakia) AC Sparta Prague
		Karel Vlk		?	
		Josef Gruss	8 July 1884 (aged 34)	0	
	DF	Karel Steiner	26 January 1895 (aged 24)	0	(Czechoslovakia) SK Viktoria Žižkov
	FW	Jan Vaník	7 May 1891 (aged 28)	2	(Czechoslovakia) SK Slavia Praha
		Jaroslav Myslick		?	
		Václav Šubrt		?	
	FW	Václav Prošek		?	

=== United States ===
Head coach: Lynn Reynolds

No.	Pos.	Player	Date of birth (age)	Caps	Club
		Lynn Reynolds		?	
	DF	Joe H. Cunat		?	
		Lt. Hall		?	
		Victor W. Johnston		?	
		Robert Patterson		?	
		Alfred Sheppard		?	
		Maurice Hudson		?	
	FW	William J. Collins		?	
	FW	Robert Gardner		?	
	FW	Frank Osbourne		?	
	FW	Harry S. Walsh		?	

Source:The forwards James P. Moore and William Oliver did not play.
