= 1919 Inter-Allied Games football final =

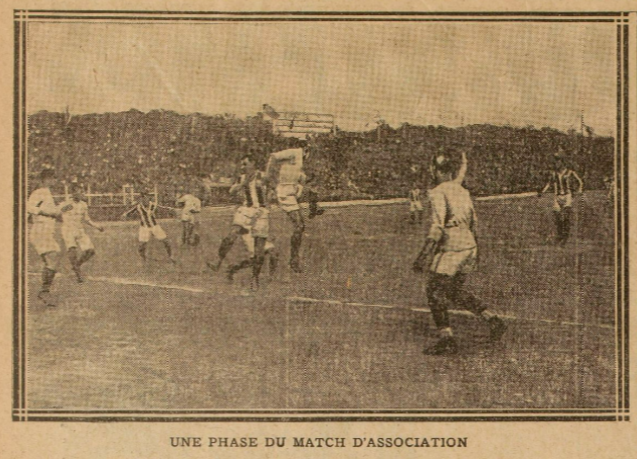
- A fragment of the match between Czechoslovakia and France
- Event: Final of the Inter-Allied Games
Czechoslovakia	France
Czech Republic	France
3	2
- Date: 29 June 1919
- Venue: Pershing Stadium, Paris
- Referee: ?
- Attendance: 25,000

The 1919 Inter-Allied Games football final was a football match to determine the winners of the football tournament of the Inter-Allied Games, a one-off multi-sport event held to celebrate the end of the First World War. The match took place in the newly constructed Pershing Stadium just outside Paris, on 29 June 1919, and it was contested by Czechoslovakia and the France, and ended in a 3–2 win to the former.

== Background ==
A total of eight nations from the Allies of World War I participated in the tournament: Belgium, Canada, Czechoslovakia, hosts France, Greece, Italy, Romania and the United States.

France won Group 1 after beating Italy 2–0 on the last matchday, while Czechoslovakia won Group 2 thanks to a 4–1 victory over Belgium on the opening matchday.

== Build-up ==
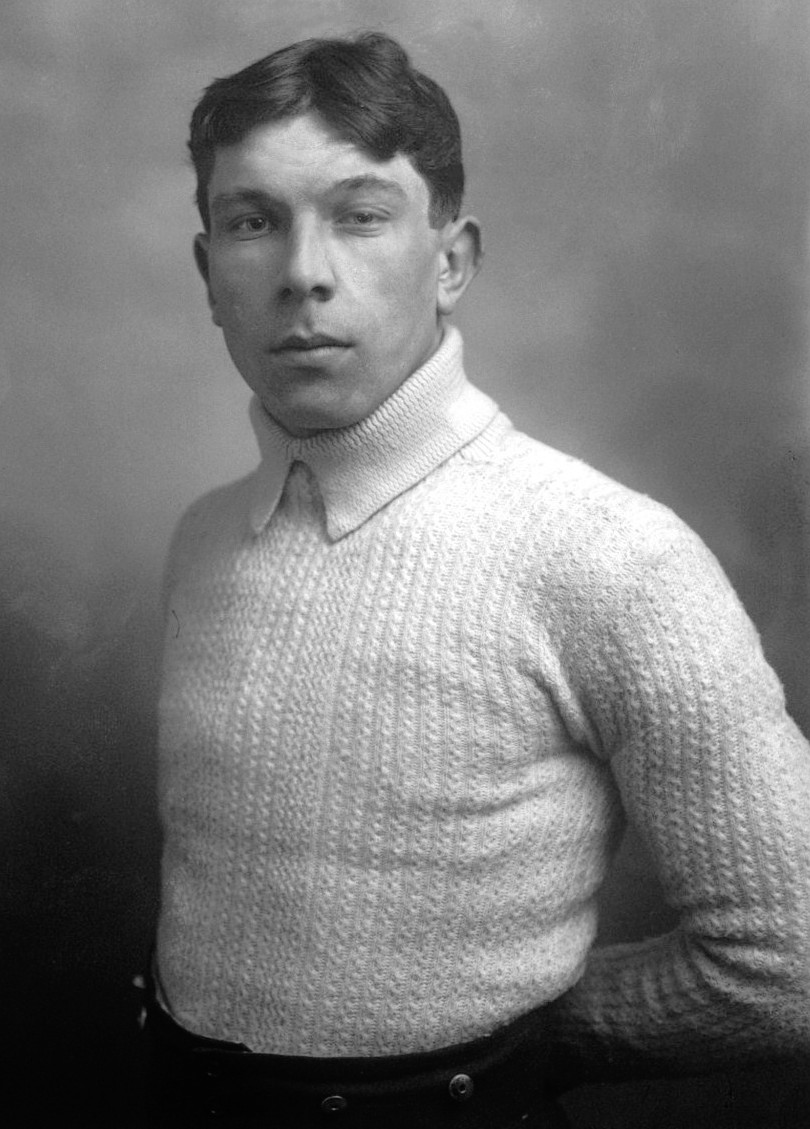
Pierre Chayriguès, France's goalkeeper in the final.

The final took place on 29 June 1919 in front of a crowd that packed the big stadium. The hosts had their line-up greatly strengthened with the addition of the Gastiger brothers (Maurice and Pierre); however, both teams were forced to make substitutions: After a tough match with the Italians, the French had to change five players, while the Czechoslovak team made two, and also made a shocking shift in their regular line-up by putting Antonín Janda in the backline while a new man, Jaroslav Červený, replaced him on the forward line.

The Czech team was mainly composed of players from Slavia Prague, who had been schooled by Johnny Madden for the past 25 years. The Czech team "demonstrated a great science and control of the ball as well as a virtuosity worthy of the great professional teams of England".

== Overview ==
Despite being deprived of Darques, Dubly, Mathieu, and Maurice Gravelines, France resisted their opponents during the first half and scored twice via Paul Deydier and Albert Rénier to take a 2–0 lead. The Czechs found themselves trailing 2–1 at half-time, and therefore, the second half saw Janda back in his regular position, and from then on the team hit its stride, but France strongly contested the Czechoslovak bid for supremacy, and soon, the contest developed into a battle between the Czechoslovak forward line, which constantly showed the crowds a series of splendid and justified combinations, and the French defense, a scenario that proved to be perfect for France's goalkeeper, Pierre Chayriguès to shine, as he put up a spectacular game and electrified the stands with his brilliant stops.

With less than 10 minutes to go, however, Janda found an equalizer. He seemed to have just forced extra-time, but just 5 minutes later, he netted the winner past Chayriguès to give his side a 3–2 win over the hosts. Besides the wonderful work of Janda, the shifty playing of Václav Pilát at the center was also a big factor in the eventual 3–2 victory. The French press stated that France was only spared from being more completely defeated thanks to Chayriguès.

== Final details ==
1919 Inter-Allied Games final
29 June 1919
16:30

France	2–3	Czechoslovakia
Deydier 12'; Rénier 28'	Report	Vanik 31'; Janda 84', 90'

Stade Pershing, Paris
Attendance: 25,000
Referee: ?

GK	Pierre Chayriguès
DF	Lucien Gamblin
DF	Eugène Langenove
MF	Émilien Devic
MF	René Petit
MF	Pierre Gastiger
FW	Henri Lesure
FW	Paul Deydier
FW	Paul Nicolas
FW	Albert Rénier
FW	Maurice Gastiger
Manager:

GK	Rudolf Klapka (Rather than František Peyr)
DF	Miroslav Pospíšil
DF	Antonín Janda (Note: Rather than Antonín Hojer. Janda replace Červený in the forward line for the second half)
MF	Karel Pešek
MF	Antonín Fivébr
MF	František Vlk
FW	Václav Prošek
FW	Jan Vaník
FW	Václav Pilát
FW	Jaroslav Červený
FW	Josef Sedláček
Manager:
Johnny Madden

== Aftermath ==
There were no more passionate fans present than the American soldiers and after the game, they carried the hard-working Janda from the field on their shoulders. Janda, by his aggressiveness and good sportsmanship, became one of the most popular players of the tournament. Janda went on to lead Czechoslovakia to the gold medal match of the 1920 Olympic Games. Later when arrangements were being made for Sparta to tour the United States in 1926, the terms of the contract reportedly stipulated for Janda to be included in the team even though he had not featured regularly for Sparta in the past two seasons.

The French press stated that "the final match was certainly the most disputed of the tournament", and also that France "provided a superb game succumbing narrowly in the very last minutes of the match by 3 goals to 2 after having kept the advantage for long minutes".
