= 1921 Coupe de France final =

- Event: 1920–21 Coupe de France
Red Star	Olympique de Paris
2	1
- Date: 24 April 1921
- Venue: Stade Pershing, Paris
- Referee: Marcel Slawik
- Attendance: 18,000

The 1921 Coupe de France final was a football match held at Stade Pershing, Paris on April 24, 1921, that saw Red Star defeat Olympique de Paris 2–1 thanks to goals by Robert Clavel and Marcel Naudin.

== Match details ==
24 April 1921

Red Star	2–1	Olympique de Paris
Clavel 53'; Naudin 77'		Landauer 78'

Stade Pershing, Paris
Attendance: 18,000
Referee: Marcel Slawik

GK	(France) Pierre Chayriguès
DF	(France) Maurice Meyer
DF	(France) Lucien Gamblin (c)
DF	(France) Raoul Marion
DF	(France) François Hugues
MF	(France) Philippe Bonnardel
MF	(France) Emile Bourdin
FW	(France) Juste Brouzes
FW	(France) Paul Nicolas
FW	(France) Marcel Naudin
FW	(France) Robert Clavel
Manager:
? Assistant Referees: Fourth Official:

GK	(France) Maurice Cottenet
DF	(France) Eugène Langenove
DF	(Belgium) Jules Huysmans
DF	(France) Paul Baron
DF	(France) Antoine Parachini
MF	(France) Georges Haas
MF	(France) Jules Dewaquez
FW	(France) Antoine Rouches
FW	(France) Paul Landauer
FW	(France) Louis Darques (c)
FW	(France) Henri Rebut
Manager:
?

== See also ==
- 1920–21 Coupe de France
