= 1922 Coupe de France final =

- Event: 1921–22 Coupe de France
Red Star	Rennes
2	0
- Date: 7 May 1922
- Venue: Stade Pershing, Paris
- Referee: Edmond Gérardin
- Attendance: 25,000

The 1922 Coupe de France final was a football match held at Stade Pershing, Paris on 7 May 1922, that saw Red Star Olympique defeat Stade Rennais UC 2–0 on goals by Paul Nicolas and Raymond Sentubéry.

== Match details ==
7 May 1922

Red Star	2–0	Rennes
Nicolas 14'; Sentubéry 87'

Stade Pershing, Paris
Attendance: 25,000
Referee: Edmond Gérardin

GK	(France) Pierre Chayriguès
DF	(France) Maurice Meyer
DF	(France) Lucien Gamblin (c)
DF	(France) Raoul Marion
DF	(France) Philippe Bonnardel
MF	(France) Maurice Thédié
MF	(France) Lucien Cordon
FW	(France) Paul Nicolas
FW	(France) Robert Joyaut
FW	(France) Marcel Naudin
FW	(France) Raymond Sentubéry
Manager:
? Assistant Referees: Fourth Official:

GK	(France) Charles Berthelot
DF	(Switzerland) Ernest Molles
DF	(France) Bernard Lenoble
DF	(England) George Scoones
DF	(France) François Hugues (c)
MF	(France) Pierre Gastiger
MF	(France) Emile Bourdin
FW	(France) Maurice Gastiger
FW	(France) Jean Caballero
FW	(France) Hervé Marc
FW	(France) Raoul Delalande
Manager:
?

== See also ==
- 1921–22 Coupe de France
