= Jean Caballero =

French footballer

Personal information
- Place of birth: France
- Position: Forward

Senior career*
Years	Team	Apps	(Gls)
1921–1922	Stade Rennais		
1923–1924	Sète		
- * Club domestic league appearances and goals

Jean Caballero was a French footballer who played as a forward for Stade Rennais and Sète in the early 1920s.

== Career ==
Together with Charles Berthelot, George Scoones, and the Gastiger brothers (Maurice and Pierre), Caballero was a member of the Stade Rennais team that reached the 1922 Coupe de France final, scoring a hat-trick in the semifinals against Olympique, but then losing the final to Red Star (2–0). The following day, the journalists of the French newspaper L'Auto (the forerunner of L'Équipe) described him as "a fiery but imprecise centre-forward", while those of L'Écho des sports stated that "it seemed as though Caballero was there to reap the rewards of the hard work put in by each wing".

Together with Ernest Gravier, Billy Cornelius, and Georges Kramer, Caballero was a member of the Sète team that reached the 1924 Coupe de France final, which ended in a 3–2 loss to Olympique de Marseille. He contributed to his team's first goal, shooting from close range to allow his teammate Louis Cazal to score on the rebound.

== Honours ==
Stade Rennais

- Coupe de France runner-up: 1921–22

Sète

- Coupe de France runner-up: 1923–24
