= Bernard Lenoble =

French footballer (1902–1997)

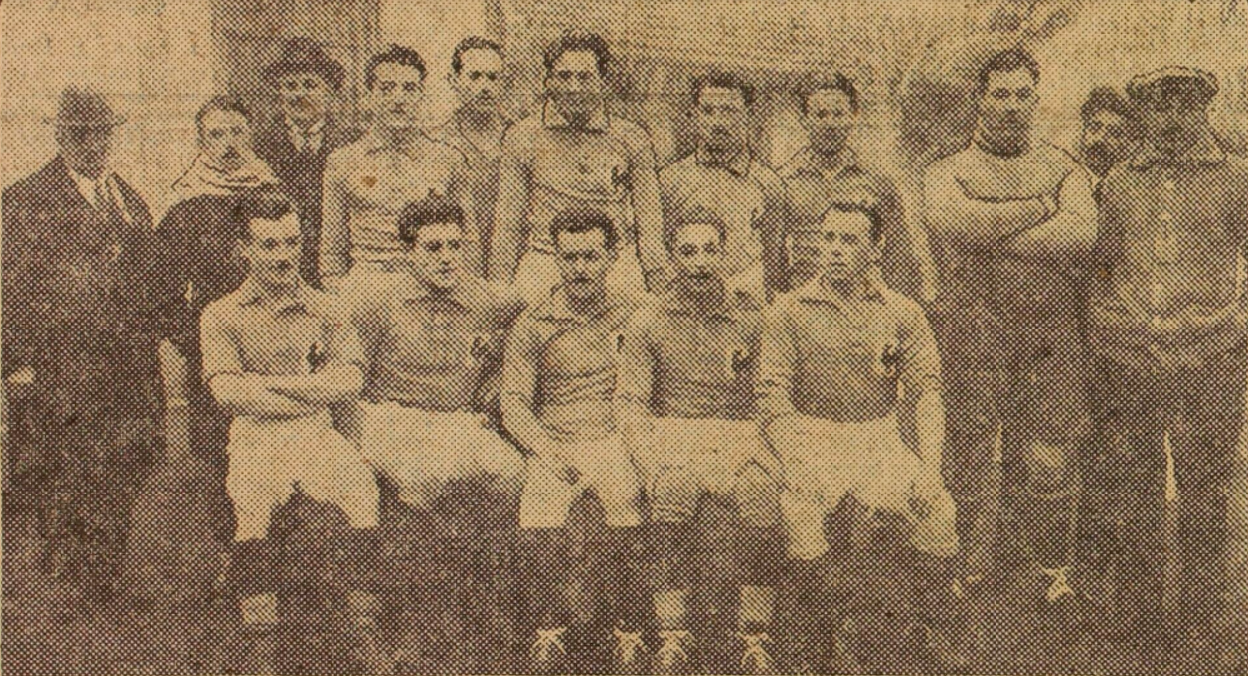
- Lenoble in 1924

Personal information
- Date of birth: 16 December 1902
- Place of birth: Le Havre, France
- Date of death: 19 November 1997 (aged 94)
- Place of death: Le Havre France
- Position: Defender

Senior career*
Years	Team	Apps	(Gls)
1910–1920	Le Havre		
1921–1922	Stade Rennais		
1923–1926	Le Havre		

International career
1924	France	2	(0)
- * Club domestic league appearances and goals

Bernard Lenoble (16 December 1902 – 19 November 1997) was a French footballer who played as a defender for Le Havre and the French national team in the 1920s.

== Playing career ==
Born on 16 December 1902 in Le Havre, (Note: Some sources wrongly claim that he was born on 16 February 1902.) Lenoble began his football career at his hometown club Le Havre AC in 1919, aged 17. He made an immediate impact on the team because in his first season there, together with Henri Gibbon, Robert Accard, and Alfred Thorel, he helped the club reach the 1920 Coupe de France final, which ended in a 2–1 loss to CA Paris.

In 1921, Lenoble went to Rennes to complete his studies, and while there, he joined the ranks of Stade Rennais, where he once again had an immediate impact on the team as in his first season there, together with Charles Berthelot, George Scoones, and Maurice Gastiger, he helped the club reach the 1922 Coupe de France final, which ended in a 2–0 loss to Red Star. He thus became the first player to lose two Coupe de France finals with two different clubs, doing so two years apart. then returned to Le Havre, with whom he played for three years, from 1923 until 1926, when he retired at the age of 24.

On 13 January 1924, the 21-year-old Lenoble earned his first international cap for France in a friendly match against Belgium at Montrouge, helping his side to a 2–0 victory. Two months later, on 23 March, he earned his last cap in another friendly, this time against Switzerland at Geneve, which ended in a 3–0 loss. In the following day, the journalists of the French newspaper L'Auto (currently L'Équipe) stated that "Lenoble is indecisive and takes too long to disengage".

== Death ==
Lenoble died in Le Havre on 19 November 1997, at the age of 94.

== Honours ==
Le Havre AC

- Coupe de France:
  - Runner-up (1): 1920

Rennes

- Coupe de France:
  - Runner-up (1): 1922
