= Pierre Gastiger =

French footballer (1893–1943)

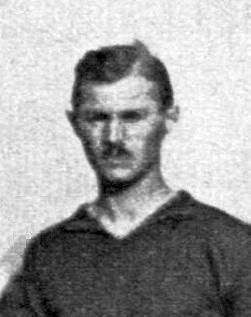
- Gastiger in 1920

Personal information
- Date of birth: 22 February 1893
- Place of birth: Hayange, France
- Date of death: 8 March 1943 (aged 50)
- Place of death: Rennes, France
- Position: Midfielder

Senior career*
Years	Team	Apps	(Gls)
1914–1921	FEC Levallois		
1921–1922	Stade Rennais		

International career
1919	France military	4	(0)
1920	France	0	(0)
- * Club domestic league appearances and goals

Pierre Gastiger (22 February 1893 – 8 March 1943) was a French footballer who played as a midfielder for Stade Rennais in the early 1920s. He was also a member of the French football squad that competed in the football tournament of the 1920 Summer Olympics in Antwerp, but he did not play in any matches.

== Playing career ==
Born on 22 February 1893 in Hayange, (Note: Some sources wrongly claim that he was born on 28 February 1893.) Gastiger was mobilized at the outbreak of the First World War in 1914, aged 21. Once the conflict was over, he took part in the 1919 Inter-Allied Games in Paris, a large sports competition organized in celebration of the Allied victory in the War, being listed as a member of the football team, whose squad was formed by soldiers who had participated in the War. Along with his brother Maurice Gastiger, Pierre helped France reach the 1919 Inter-Allied Games football final, which ended in a 3–2 loss to Czechoslovakia. The following year, he was called up by the French team to compete in the football tournament of the 1920 Summer Olympics in Antwerp, but he did not play in any matches.

The Gastiger brothers later joined Stade Rennais, where they played a crucial role, together with Charles Berthelot, George Scoones, and Bernard Lenoble, in helping the club reach the 1922 Coupe de France final, which ended in a 2–0 loss to Red Star. The following day, the journalists of the French newspaper L'Auto (the forerunner of L'Équipe) described him as "a capable and courageous half-back".

== Death ==
Gastiger died in Rennes on 8 March 1943, at the age of 50.

== Honours ==
Rennes

- Coupe de France:
  - Runner-up (1): 1922
