= Raymond Sentubéry =

French footballer (1901–1981)

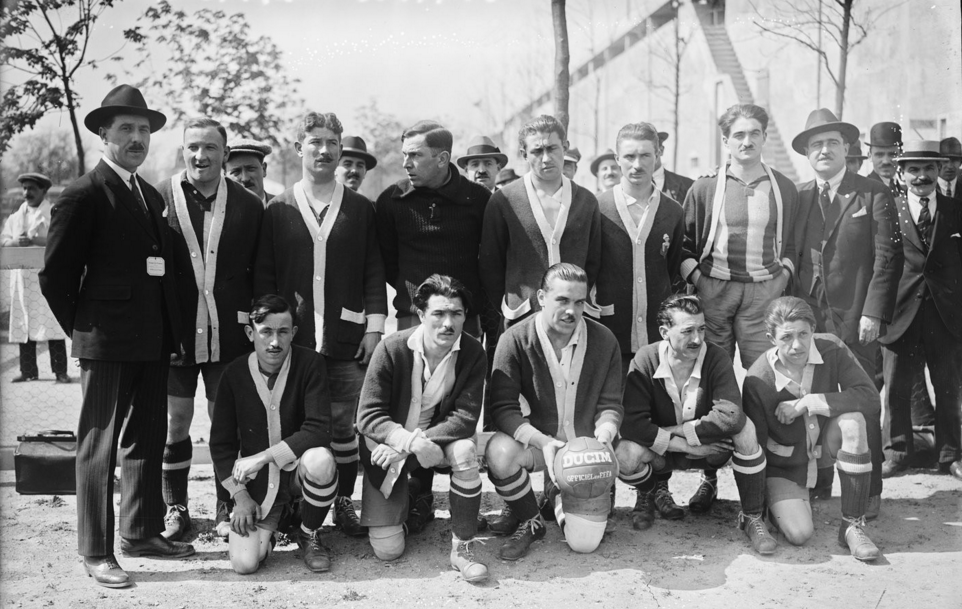
- Sentubéry (crouching, first from right) with the Red Star in the 1922 Coupe de France final

Personal information
- Full name: Raymond Marie Sentubéry
- Date of birth: 21 November 1901
- Place of birth: 16th arrondissement of Paris, France
- Date of death: 4 July 1981 (aged 79)
- Place of death: Albert, Somme, France
- Position: Forward

Senior career*
Years	Team	Apps	(Gls)
1920–1921	Étoile des Deux Lacs		
1921–1923	Red Star		
1923–1924	Stade Rennais		
1924–1933	Club Français		
1933–1934	Nice		
1934–1935	Saint-Malo		
1935–1936	Stade de Reims		

International career
1924–1926	France	3	(0)
- * Club domestic league appearances and goals

Raymond Marie Sentubéry (21 November 1901 – 4 July 1981) was a French footballer who played as a forward for Red Star, Club Français, and the France national team in the 1920s.

== Playing career ==
=== Club career ===
Born in the 16th arrondissement of Paris on 21 November 1901, (Note: Some sources wrongly claim that he was born in 1900.) Sentubéry began his football career in 1920, aged 19, at his hometown club Étoile des Deux Lacs, from which he joined Jules Rimet's Red Star. Together with Pierre Chayriguès, Lucien Gamblin, and Paul Nicolas, he played a crucial role in helping the Red Star team win back-to-back Coupe de France titles in 1922 and 1923, starting in both finals as his side defeated Rennes (2–0) and Sète (4–2), respectively. In the former final, he netted his side's second goal with a header in the 87th minute. On 12 February 1922, he started in the final of the 1922 Ligue de Paris against Olympique, scoring his side's third goal to seal a 3–0 victory with a "shot from 15 meters into the corner of the goal".

Despite all his success at Red Star, Sentubéry left the club in 1923, and after a brief stint at Stade Rennais (1923–24), he joined Club Français, with whom he played for nearly a decade, from 1924 until 1933. After leaving CF, he played one season each in Nice (1933–34), Saint-Malo (1934–35), and Stade de Reims, where he retired in 1936, aged 35.

=== International career ===
On 11 November 1924, the 22-year-old Sentubéry made his international debut for France in a friendly against Belgium in Molenbeek, which ended in a 3–0 loss. The following day, the journalists of the French newspaper L'Auto (the future L'Équipe) stated that he "only played properly at the end of the match". In total, he earned three international caps for France, with the next two both coming in 1926, in friendlies against Belgium (4–3) and Austria (1–4).

== Death ==
Sentubéry died in Albert, Somme, on 4 July 1981, at the age of 79.

== Honours ==
Red Star

- Coupe de France:
  - Champions (2): 1921–22, and 1922–23
- Ligue de Paris
  - Champions (1): 1922
