= Robert Clavel (footballer) =

French footballer (1899–1983)

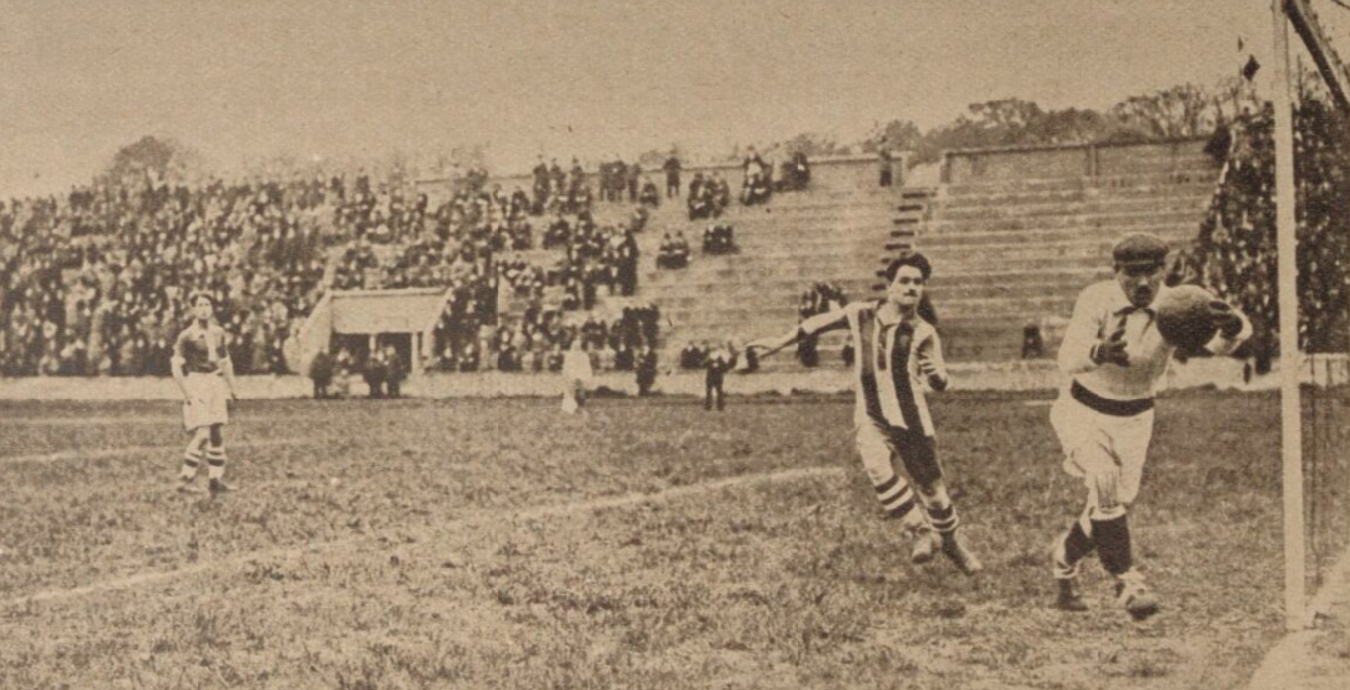
- Robert Clavel charging Maurice Cottenet in the 1921 Coupe de France final

Personal information
- Full name: Robert Édouard Henri Clavel
- Date of birth: 27 June 1899
- Place of birth: Le Raincy, France
- Date of death: 5 December 1983 (aged 84)
- Place of death: Champs-sur-Marne, France
- Position: Forward

Senior career*
Years	Team	Apps	(Gls)
1919–1924	Red Star		
- * Club domestic league appearances and goals

Robert Édouard Henri Clavel (27 June 1899 – 5 December 1983) was a French footballer who played as a forward for Red Star in the early 1920s, netting a goal in the 1921 Coupe de France final, which was the club's first Coupe de France title.

== Career ==
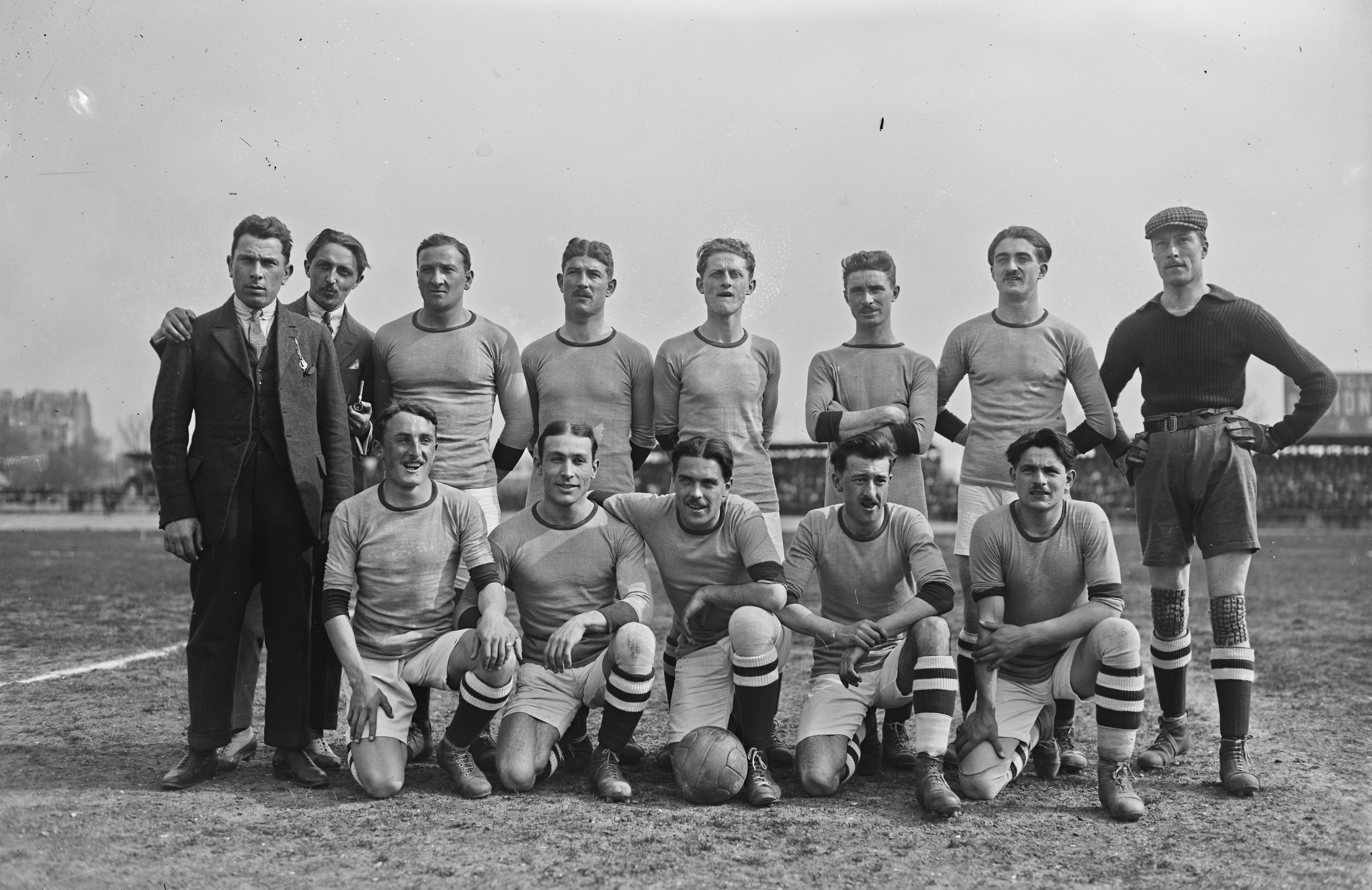
Clavel (front row on the right) in 1921.

Born on 7 June 1899 in Le Raincy, Clavel began his football career at Jules Rimet's Red Star in 1919, aged 20, with whom he played for five years, until 1924.

Together with Pierre Chayriguès, Maurice Meyer, and Lucien Gamblin, Clavel was a member of the Red Star team that won the Coupe de France title in 1921, scoring the opening goal of the final with "a nice shot from the wing" to help his side to a 2–1 win over Olympique de Paris at the Stade Pershing. The following day, the journalists of the French newspaper Le Miroir des sports stated that his "speed and skill on the ball were rightly appreciated by the crowd, having several opportunities to score, but, lacking confidence in his shot, he squandered these opportunities", adding that in the second-half, he "was rewarded for his efforts by scoring with a beautiful right-footed shot".

Red Star went on to win a further two Coupe de France titles in 1922 and 1923, but he did not play in either of those finals.

== Death ==
In 1922, Clavel married Renée Marguerite Bangratz, and on 5 December 1983, he died in Champs-sur-Marne at the age of 84.

== Honours ==
Red Star

- Coupe de France:
  - Champions (1): 1920–21
- DH Paris League
  - Champions (3): 1921, 1922, and 1924
