= Robert Clavel =

Robert Clavel may refer to:

- Robert Clavel (footballer) (1899–1983), French footballer
- Robert Clavel (art director) (1912–1991), French art director
