= Ernest Molles =

Swiss footballer

Personal information
- Full name: Ernest Molles
- Place of birth: Switzerland
- Position: Defender

Senior career*
Years	Team	Apps	(Gls)
1916–1917	Montriond Lausanne	–	(–)
1920–1926	Stade Rennais UC	–	(–)

International career
1917	Switzerland	1	(0)
- * Club domestic league appearances and goals

Ernest Molles (born in Switzerland) was a Swiss international football player.

== Career ==
Molles was born in Switzerland and played for FC Montriond, now known as FC Lausanne-Sport, in his home country before moving to France after World War I to play for Stade Rennais UC. He spent seven years at the club. In 1922, he played on the team that reached the final of the Coupe de France. In the final, Rennes were defeated 2–0 by Red Star Olympique. Molles also played for the Swiss national team. His only documented appearance was on 23 December 1917 against Austria, which ended in a 1–0 defeat.
