= Louis Darques =

French footballer (1896–1984)

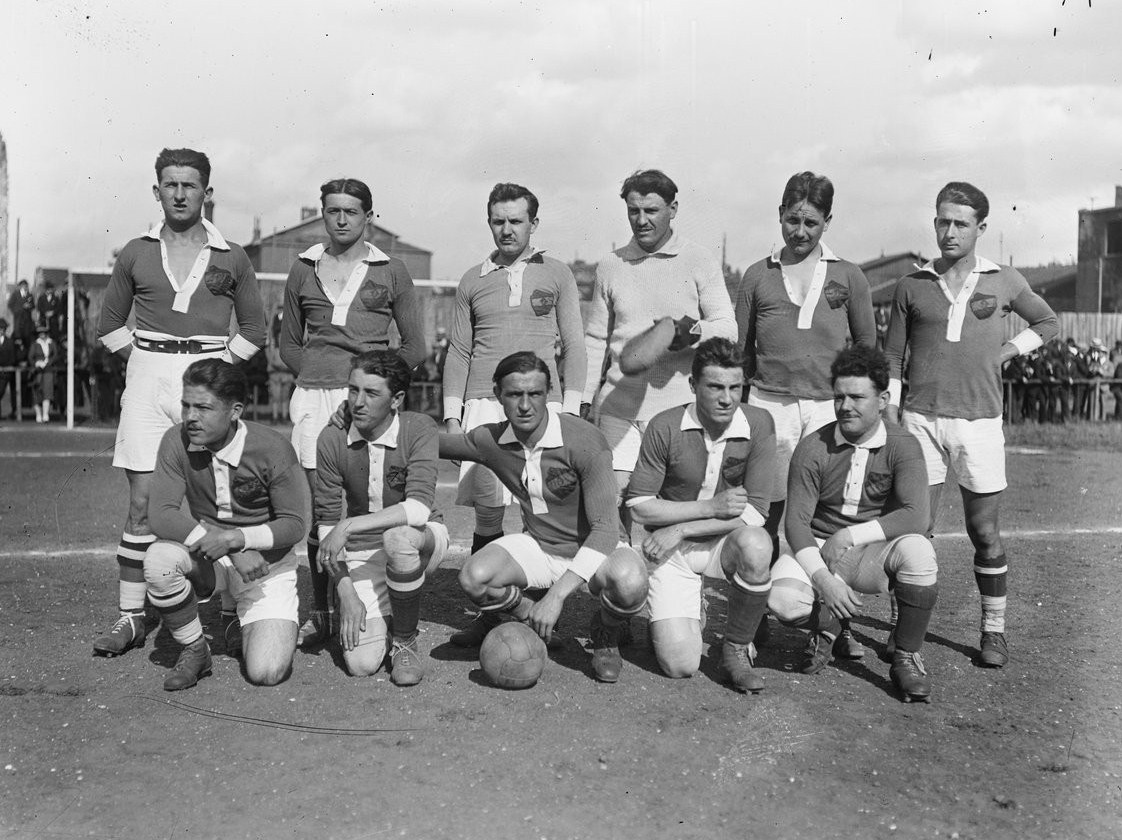
- Darques (crouching, second from right) in 1920

Personal information
- Full name: Louis Théodule Darques
- Date of birth: 8 June 1896
- Place of birth: Saint-Ouen, Paris, France
- Date of death: 18 February 1984 (aged 87)
- Place of death: Bobigny, France
- Position: Midfielder

Senior career*
Years	Team	Apps	(Gls)
1916–1917	JA Saint-Ouen		
1917–1924	Olympique de Pantin		
1924–1927	Red Star		
1927–1928	Club Français		
1928	Cannes		
1929–1930	Red Star		

International career
1919–1923	France	9	(1)
- * Club domestic league appearances and goals

Louis Théodule Darques (8 June 1896 – 18 February 1984) was a French footballer who played as a midfielder for Olympique de Pantin and the France national team between 1917 and 1924. He was the captain of the Pantin team for several years, leading them to three finals of the Coupe de France between 1918 and 1921, and netting a goal in two of them, including in the tournament's first-ever final in 1918, thus becoming the first captain to lift a Coupe de France trophy.

== Club career ==
=== Early career ===
Born on 8 June 1896 in the Saint-Ouen, Paris, Darques began his football career in his hometown club JA Saint-Ouen in 1916, aged 20, where he quickly stood out from the rest, so in the following season, he was signed by Olympique de Pantin in 1917, where he quickly established himself as the team's captain.

=== 1917–18 Coupe de France ===
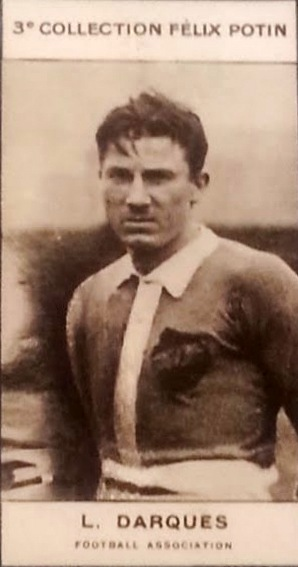
Darques' football collection card.

In his first season at the club, Darques led Olympique in the inaugural edition of the Coupe de France; in the semifinals against CASG Paris in Saint-Ouen on 3 March, he scored the winning goal in the 85th minute (2–1) with a "superb kick", thus contributing decisively in helping his side reach the first-ever final of the Coupe de France, held on 5 May in Paris, in which he failed to convert a penalty in the first-half, but then redeemed himself by scoring his side's third goal in an eventual 3–0 win over FC Lyon. In the following day, the journalists of the French newspaper L'Auto (the future L'Équipe) praised his performance, stating that for his goal he "dribbled through the FC Lyon rearguard, resisting shoulder blows and pressure". At the end of the match, the trophy was given to the captain Louis Darques, who thus became the first to lift it.

=== 1918–19 Coupe de France ===
In the following year, Darques once again scored in the cup semifinals, netting the opening goal in an epic 4–3 comeback victory over VGA Médoc; in the following day, L'Auto stated that he "is currently one of the best French forwards". In the final, he once again captained by example, scoring a second-half equaliser to force extra-time in an eventual 3–2 loss to CASG Paris.

=== Later career ===
Together with Émile Fiévet, Paul Landauer, and Jules Dewaquez, he was a member of the great Pantin team of the early 1920s, which won the Ligue de Paris in 1921, the Coupe de Paris in 1923, and which reached another Coupe de France final in 1921. On many of these finals, their opponent was Jules Rimet's Red Star, such as the 1921 cup final, which ended in a 2–1 loss; Darques nearly scored his third goal in as many finals when he fired a shot into an empty net, but Red Star's full-back Lucien Gamblin stopped the ball with both hands, and Dewaquez then missed the subsequent penalty. In the following year, they faced Red Star in the final of the 1922 Ligue de Paris, in which he won a penalty after being violently pushed by Red Star full-back Maurice Meyer, but then failed to convert it in an eventual 3–0 loss. Two years later, the 1922–23 season was summed up as a duel between both clubs, already presented in the press as "eternal rivals", and in the final of the 1923 Coupe de Paris, Darques scored his side's second goal to seal a 2–0 victory over Red Star.

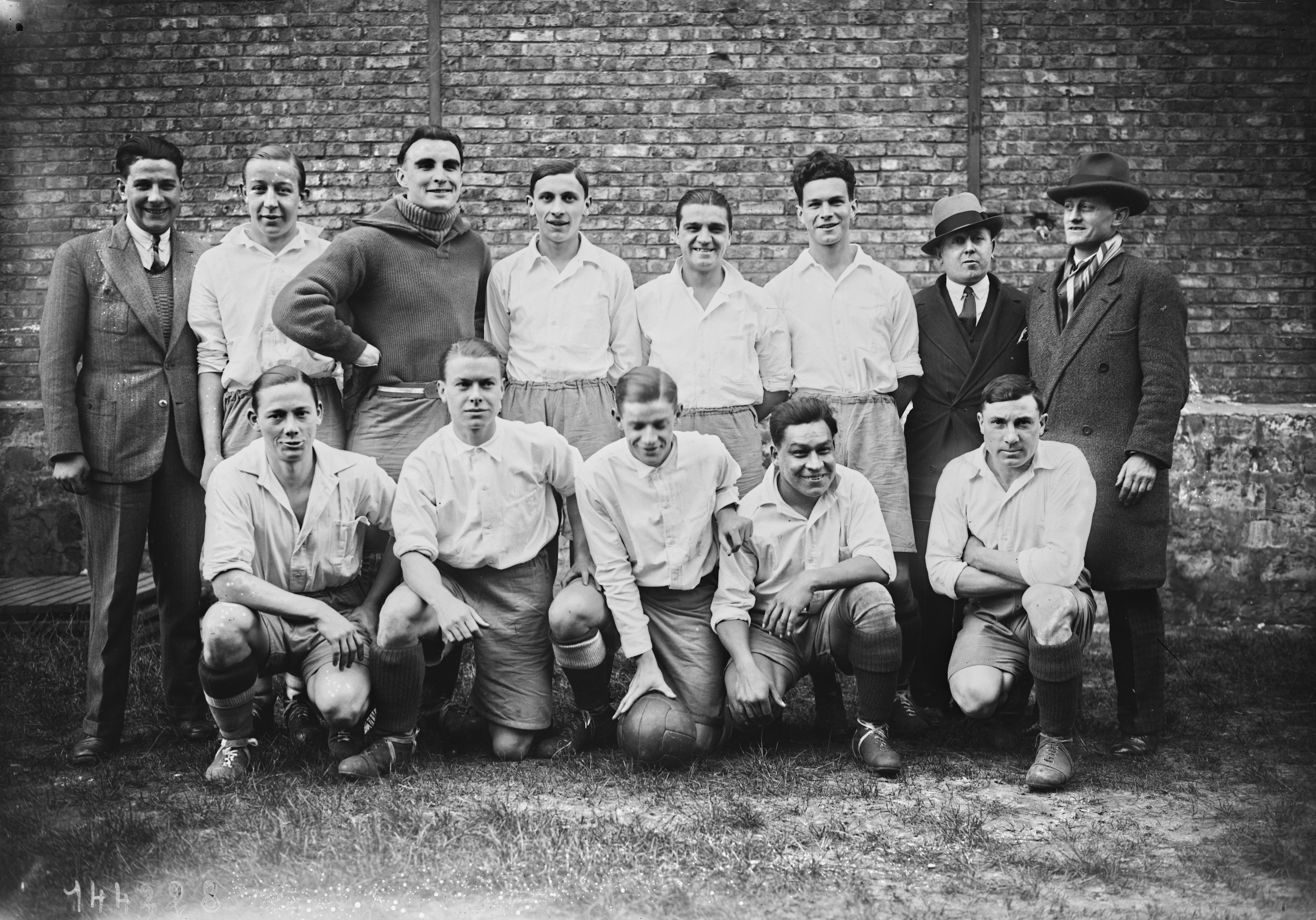
Darques (crouching, first from right) with the Red Star team on 2 March 1930.

In 1924, Darques left Olympique to join Red Star, with whom he played for three years, until 1927, when he joined Club Français. Later that same season, he went to Cannes, before ending his career at Red Star in 1930, aged 34.

== International career ==
On 9 March 1919, the 22-year-old Darques made his international debut in a friendly against Belgium at Uccle, which ended in a 2–2 draw; Darques assisted France's first goal. He went on to earn a total of nine international caps for France between 1919 and 1923, but he scored only once, in another friendly against Belgium at the Colombes on 15 January 1922, to help his side to a 2–1 win.

== Death ==
Darques died in Bobigny on 18 February 1984, at the age of 81.

== Honours ==
Olympique de Pantin

- Coupe de France:
  - Champions (1): 1917–18
  - Runner-up (2): 1918–19 and 1920–21
- Ligue de Paris
  - Champions (1): 1921
  - Runner-up (1): 1922
- Coupe de Paris
  - Champions (1): 1923
