= Jean Batmale =

French footballer (1895-1973)

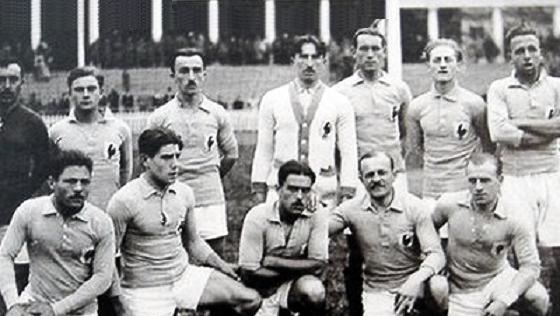
- Batmale (second player standing) during the 1920 Olympics

Personal information
- Date of birth: 18 September 1895
- Place of birth: Pau, France
- Date of death: 3 June 1973 (aged 77)
- Place of death: Rennes, France
- Position: Midfielder

Senior career*
Years	Team	Apps	(Gls)
- Club Français
- FC Levallois
- Clichy
- Club Français
- Rennes
- Olympique Alès
- Nice

International career
1920–1924	France	6	(0)

Managerial career
- 1936–1941: Rennes
- 1942–1945: Rennes
- 1945–1946: Roubaix-Tourcoing
- 1947–1948: Nœux-les-Mines
- 1948–1950: Monaco
- * Club domestic league appearances and goals

Jean Batmale (18 September 1895 – 3 June 1973) was a French footballer who played as a midfielder for the France national team at the 1920 and 1924 Summer Olympics.
