= Marcel Naudin =

French footballer (1895–?)

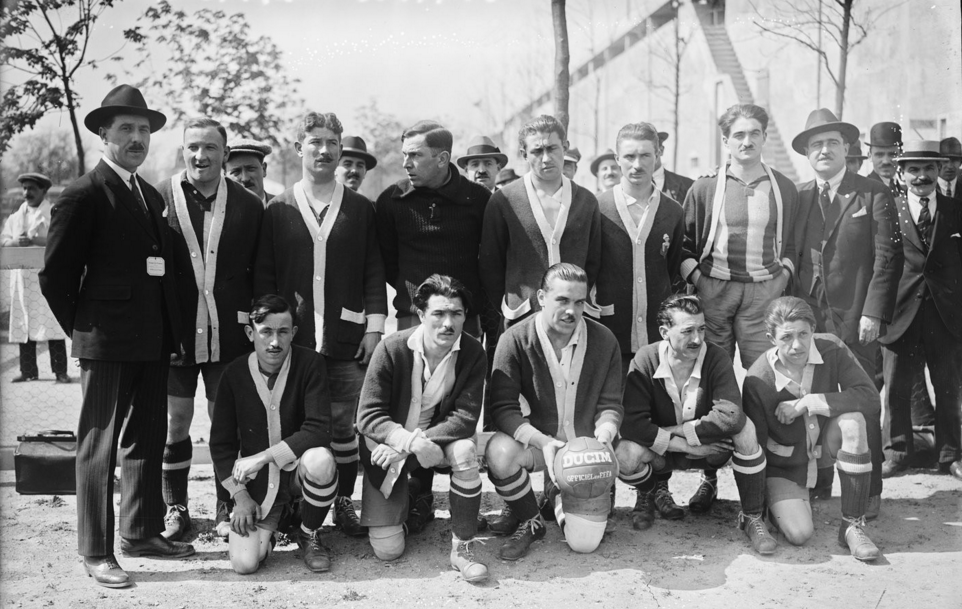
- Naudin (crouching, second from right) in 1920

Personal information
- Date of birth: 1895
- Place of birth: France
- Position: Forward

Senior career*
Years	Team	Apps	(Gls)
1919–1924	Red Star		
- * Club domestic league appearances and goals

Marcel Jean Henri Naudin (born 1895; date of death unknown) was a French footballer who played as a forward for Red Star in the early 1920s.

== Career ==
Born in 1895, (Note: Some sources state that he was born as Marcel Jean Henri Naudin in the 16th arrondissement of Paris on 11 September 1895, but this is actually a different person, who was killed during the First World War on 17 June 1916.) Naudin was a member of the great Red Star team of the early 1920s, which won a three-peat of Coupe de France titles between 1921 and 1923, with him starting in each of those finals, helping his side defeat Olympique (2–1), Rennes (2–0), and Sète (4–2), respectively. Naudin is thus one of the few players who won three Coupe de France titles, to which he contributed decisively, as he scored the winner in the 1921 final, as well as a brace within seven minutes in the 1923 final.

On 12 February 1922, Naudin started in the final of the 1922 Ligue de Paris against Olympique, assisting Juste Brouzes for the second goal in an eventual 3–0 victory.

== Honours ==
Red Star

- Coupe de France: 1920–21, 1921–22, and 1922–23
- Ligue de Paris: 1922
