= Franz Pleyer =

Footballer (1911–1999)

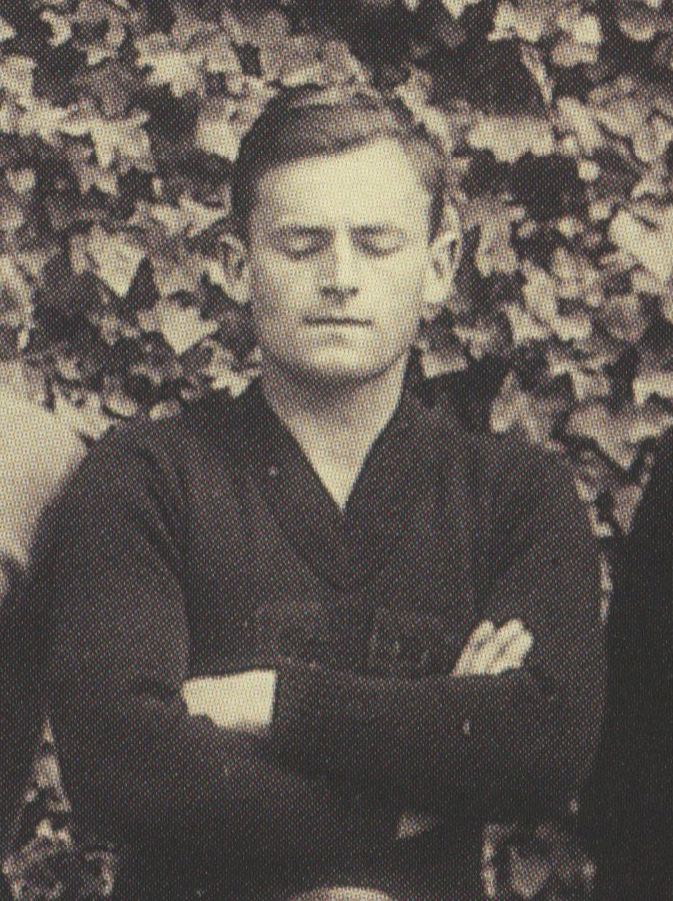
- Pleyer with Rennes in 1935

Personal information
- Date of birth: 23 February 1911
- Place of birth: Vienna, Austria
- Date of death: 3 September 1999 (aged 88)
- Position: Defender

Senior career*
Years	Team	Apps	(Gls)
–1933	Brigittenauer AC	–	(–)
1933–1939	Rennes	171	(2)
1946–1951	Rennes	40	(0)
Total		211	(2)

Managerial career
- 1945–1952: Rennes
- * Club domestic league appearances and goals

Franz "François" Pleyer (23 February 1911 – 3 September 1999) was a naturalized French professional footballer.

== Career ==
Pleyer was born in Vienna, the capital city of Austria. He played for Brigittenauer AC in his home country before moving to France in 1933 to play for Stade Rennais UC. Pleyer spent the rest of his career playing for Rennes appearing in over 200 matches for the club. In 1935, he played on the team that reached the final of the Coupe de France. In the final, Rennes were defeated 3–0 by Marseille. In December 1936, Player acquired French citizenship and adopted the name François, the French anglicisation of Franz.

In 1939, Pleyer's football career was put on hold due to World War II. He served for France during the war and, following its conclusion, returned to Rennes. Pleyer spent his latter years with the club serving in a player-coach role. His final appearance with Rennes was in May 1951 at the age of 40.
