= Antoine Parachini =

French footballer (1897–1963)

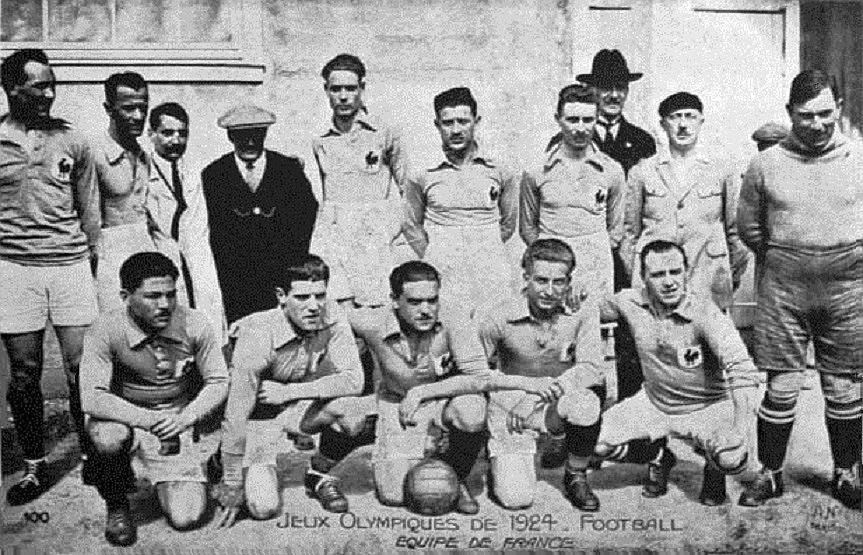
- France football 1924 Olympics

Personal information
- Date of birth: 13 July 1897
- Place of birth: Sète, France
- Date of death: 9 November 1963 (aged 66)

International career
Years	Team	Apps	(Gls)
- France

Antoine Parachini (13 July 1897 – 9 November 1963) was a French footballer. He competed in the men's tournament at the 1924 Summer Olympics.
