= Maurice Thédié =

French footballer (1896–1944)

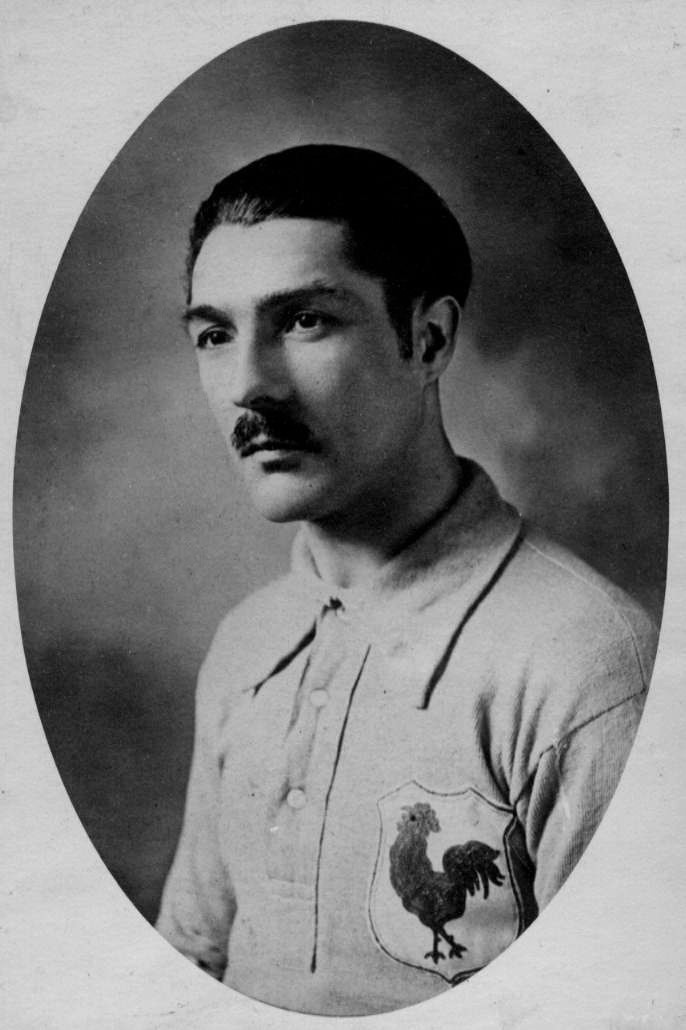
- Thédié in 1924

Personal information
- Full name: Maurice Jacques Thédié
- Date of birth: 29 January 1896
- Place of birth: Puteaux, France
- Date of death: 2 July 1944 (aged 48)
- Position: Defender

Senior career*
Years	Team	Apps	(Gls)
1921–1922	Red Star Amical Club		
1922–1925	AC Amiens		

International career
1925	France	1	(0)
- * Club domestic league appearances and goals

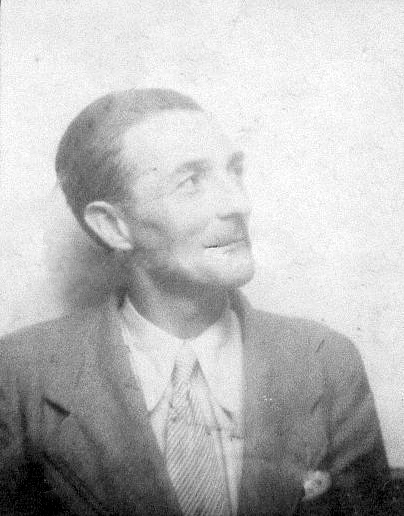
Thedie in 1942

Maurice Jacques Thédié (29 January 1896 – 2 July 1944) was a French footballer who played for Red Star Amical Club and AC Amiens. He was part of the France national team, playing one match in 1925. A member of the French Resistance during the Second World War, Thédié was arrested and died on a train bound for Dachau concentration camp on 2 July 1944.
