= Giuseppe Trivellini =

Italian footballer

Personal information
- Full name: Giuseppe Trivellini
- Date of birth: 26 September 1895
- Place of birth: Gottolengo, Italy
- Date of death: 28 April 1977 (aged 81)
- Place of death: Brescia, Italy
- Position: Goalkeeper

Senior career*
Years	Team	Apps	(Gls)
1911–1930	Brescia	208	(0)

International career
1915–1923	Italy	7	(0)
- * Club domestic league appearances and goals

Giuseppe Trivellini (Italian pronunciation: [dʒuˈzɛppe trivelˈliːni]; 26 September 1895 – 28 April 1977) was an Italian footballer who played as a goalkeeper. One of the first one-club men in Italy, he played for Brescia throughout his entire career.

He represented Italy seven times, the first being on 31 January 1915, the occasion of a friendly match against Switzerland in a 3–1 home win.
