= Auguste Fierens =

Belgian footballer (1892–?)

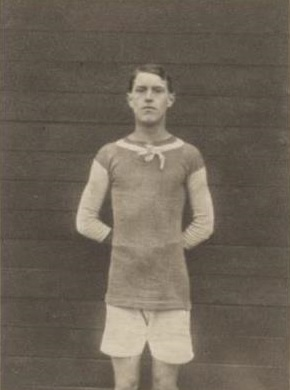

Personal information
- Date of birth: 14 July 1892
- Position: Defender

International career
Years	Team	Apps	(Gls)
1920	Belgium	1	(0)

Auguste Fierens ( 14 July 1892 — ?) was a Belgian footballer. He played in one match for the Belgium national football team in 1920.
