= Maurice Meyer =

French footballer (1892–1971)

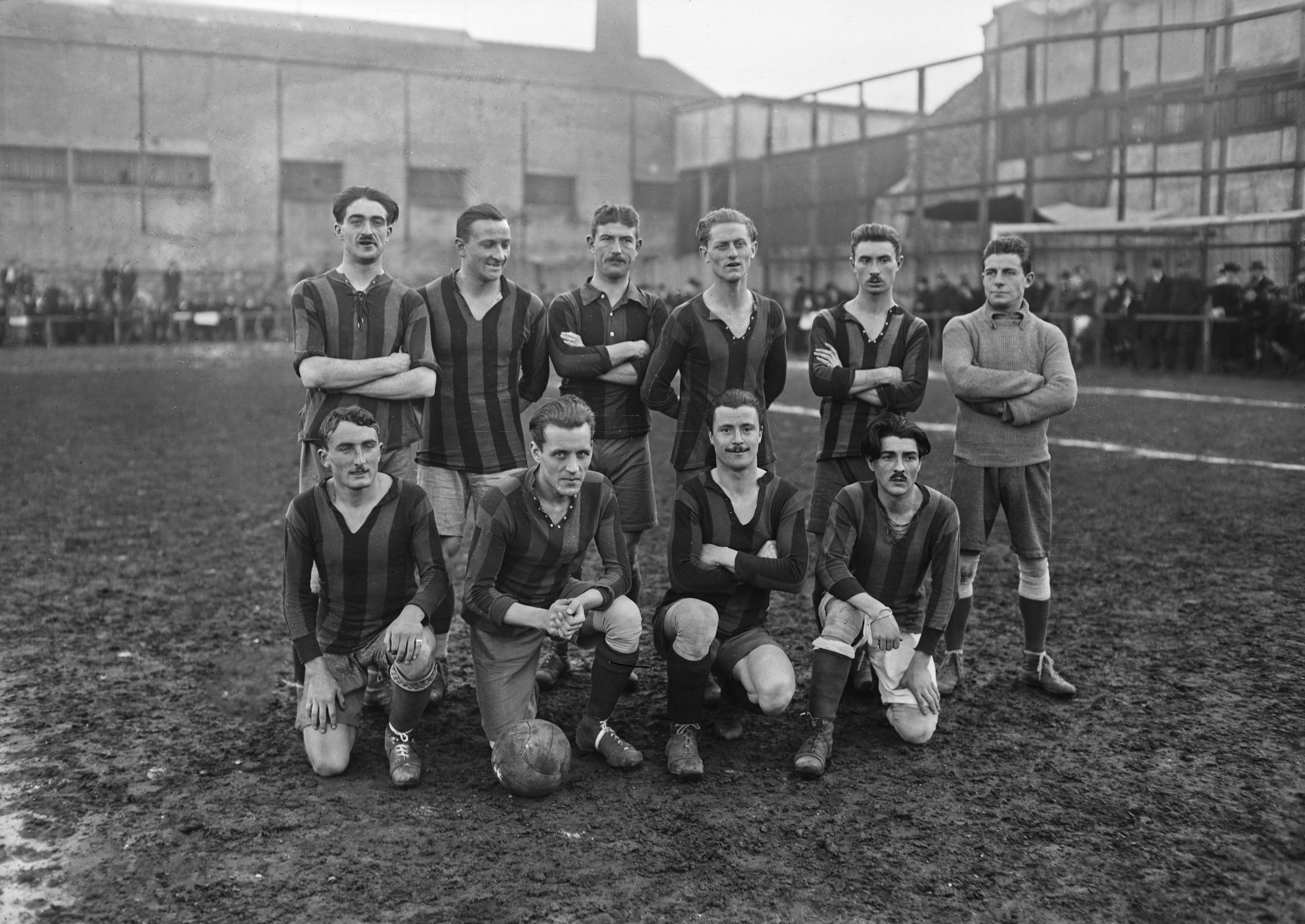
- Meyer (standing, first from left) in 1920

Personal information
- Full name: Maurice René Meyer
- Date of birth: 17 August 1892
- Place of birth: 6th arrondissement of Paris, France
- Date of death: 25 March 1971 (aged 78)
- Place of death: Draveil, France
- Position: Defender

Senior career*
Years	Team	Apps	(Gls)
- CASG Paris
1919–1925	Red Star		

International career
1921	France	1	(0)
- * Club domestic league appearances and goals

Maurice René Meyer (17 August 1892 – 25 March 1971) was a French footballer who played as a defender for Red Star and the France national team in the early 1920s.

== Playing career ==
Born in the 6th arrondissement of Paris on 17 August 1892, Meyer began playing football in his hometown club CASG Paris before joining Jules Rimet's Red Star in 1919, with whom he played for six years, until 1925. He was a solid defender who was easily recognizable on the pitch due to the black beret he always wore.

Together with goalkeeper Pierre Chayriguès and Lucien Gamblin, Meyer was a member of the famous Red Star backline of the early 1920s, which was the driving force behind the club's three-peat of Coupe de France titles between 1921 and 1923, with this trio starting in each of those finals, helping their side defeat Olympique (2–1), Rennes (2–0), and Sète (4–2), respectively. Meyer is thus one of the few players who won three Coupe de France titles. On 12 February 1922, he started in the final of the 1922 Ligue de Paris against Olympique, helping his side keep a clean-sheet in a 3–0 victory despite conceding a penalty after violently pushing Olympique forward Louis Darques, who hit the woodwork.

On 8 February 1921, Meyer earned his first (and only) international cap for France in a friendly against Ireland at the Parc des Princes, which ended in a 1–2 loss.

== Death ==
Meyer died in Draveil on 25 March 1971, at the age of 81.

== Honours ==
Red Star

- Coupe de France:
  - Champions (3): 1920–21, 1921–22, and 1922–23
- Ligue de Paris
  - Champions (1): 1922
