= Jaroslav Červený =

Czech footballer (1895–1950)

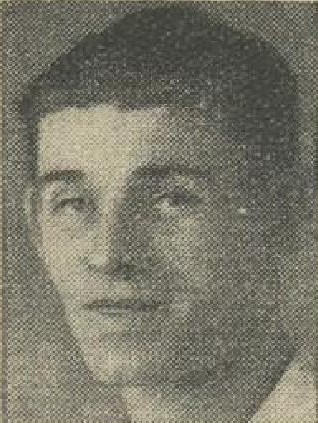
- Červený in 1926

Personal information
- Date of birth: 1 June 1895
- Place of birth: Prague, Bohemia, Austria-Hungary
- Date of death: 4 May 1950 (aged 54)
- Positions: Forward; midfielder

Senior career*
Years	Team	Apps	(Gls)
–1914	Olympia VII		
1914–1919	Sparta Prague		
1919–1921	HŠK Concordia		
1921–1926	Sparta Prague		
1926–1928	Chicago Sparta		
1928–1931	Sparta Prague		

International career
1923–1925	Czechoslovakia	7	(0)
- * Club domestic league appearances and goals

Jaroslav Červený (1 June 1895 – 4 May 1950) was a Czech footballer who played as a forward or midfielder. He represented Czechoslovakia internationally, and competed in the men's tournament at the 1924 Summer Olympics. At club level, he played for Olympia VII (up to 1914), Sparta Prague (1914–1919, 1921–1926 and 1928–1931), HŠK Concordia (1919–1921) and Chicago Sparta (1926–1928).

== Honours ==
Sparta Prague

- Mistrovství ČSF: 1919, 1922
- Czechoslovak First League: 1925–26
