= Maurice Cottenet =

French footballer (1895-1972)

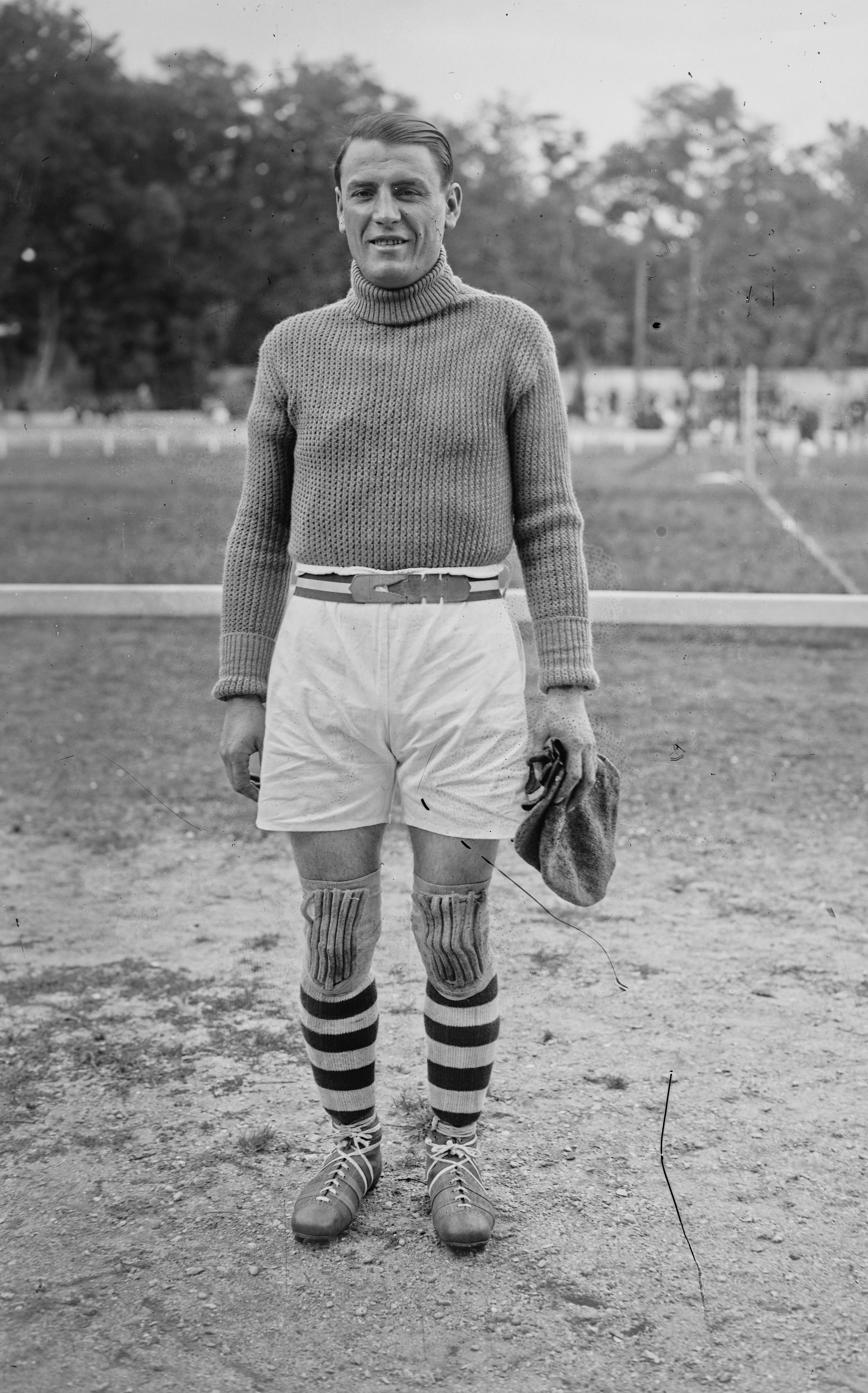
- Cottenet in 1923

Personal information
- Date of birth: 11 February 1895
- Place of birth: Le Raincy, France
- Date of death: 11 April 1972 (aged 77)
- Position: Goalkeeper

Senior career*
Years	Team	Apps	(Gls)
- Jeanne-d'Arc Sport
- Raincy Sports
- Olympique de Paris
- Cannes
- RU Alger
- AS Bône

International career
1920–1927	France	18	(0)

Managerial career
- 1936–1938: Caen
- 1945–1946: Cannes
- 1948–1950: FC Sète
- * Club domestic league appearances and goals

Maurice Cottenet (11 February 1895 – 11 April 1972) was a French footballer. He was part of France national football team at the 1924 Summer Olympics, but he did not play in any matches.
