= Eugène Langenove =

French footballer (1899-1958)

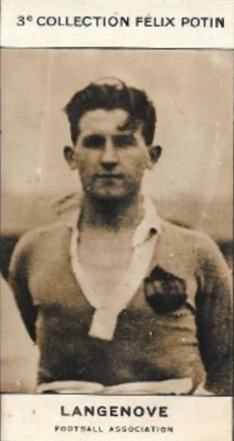

Personal information
- Date of birth: 12 August 1899
- Place of birth: Paris, France
- Date of death: 3 March 1958 (aged 58)
- Place of death: Issy-les-Moulineaux, France
- Position: Defender

Senior career*
Years	Team	Apps	(Gls)
- Olympique de Paris
- Le Havre
1922	Walsall		
- Red Star
1927–1928	AS Cannes		
1928–1932	OGC Nice		

International career
1921	France	2	(0)
- * Club domestic league appearances and goals

Eugène Langenove (12 August 1899 – 3 March 1958) was a French footballer who played as a defender. After being banned by the French federation, he became the first Frenchman to play league football in England when he signed for Walsall in 1922. He participated in the Coupe de France Final 1921 with Olympique de Paris. Georges Crozier, who played for Fulham in the Southern League between 1904 and 1906, was the first Frenchman to play in England.
