= Václav Pilát =

Czechoslovak footballer

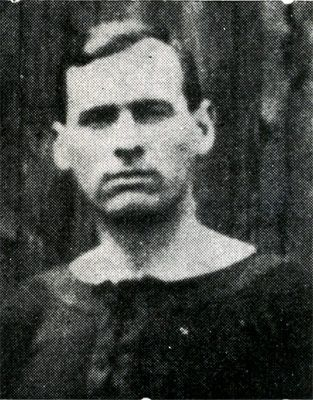
- Václav Pilát in 1923

Personal information
- Date of birth: 6 May 1888
- Place of birth: Prague, Austria-Hungary
- Date of death: 28 January 1971 (aged 82)
- Place of death: Prague, Czechoslovakia
- Position: Forward

Senior career*
Years	Team	Apps	(Gls)
1905–1908	Old Town Olympia		
1910–1923	Sparta Prague		
1925–1926	ČAFC Prague		

International career
1920–1922	Czechoslovakia	4	(0)
- * Club domestic league appearances and goals

Václav Pilát (6 May 1888 – 28 January 1971) was a Czechoslovak footballer. He competed in the men's tournament at the 1920 Summer Olympics. On a club level, he played for AC Sparta Prague.
