= Miroslav Pospíšil =

Czechoslovak footballer

Personal information
- Date of birth: 27 September 1890
- Place of birth: Prague, Austria-Hungary
- Date of death: 1964 (aged 73–74)

International career
Years	Team	Apps	(Gls)
1920–1922	Czechoslovakia	5	(0)

Miroslav Pospíšil (27 September 1890 – 1964) was a Czechoslovak footballer. He competed in the men's tournament at the 1920 Summer Olympics. On a club level, he played for AC Sparta Prague.
