= František Peyr =

Czech footballer

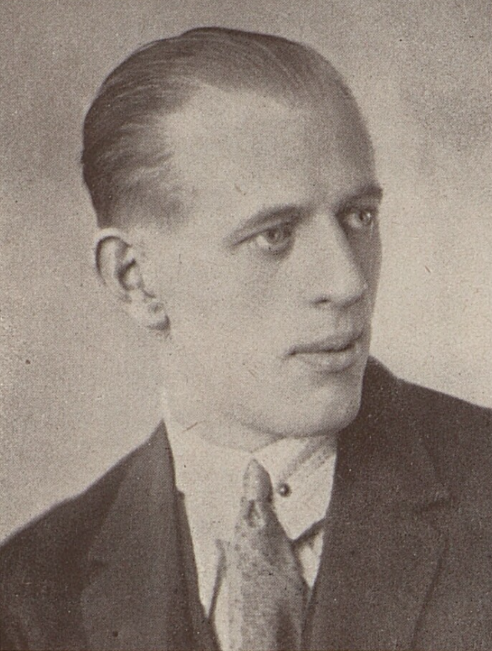

Personal information
- Date of birth: 5 August 1896
- Place of birth: Prague, Austria-Hungary
- Date of death: 26 November 1955 (aged 59)

International career
Years	Team	Apps	(Gls)
- Czechoslovakia

František Peyr (5 August 1896 – 26 November 1955) was a Czech footballer. He played in two matches for the Czechoslovakia national football team in 1923.
