= Charles Berthelot =

French footballer (1901–1940)

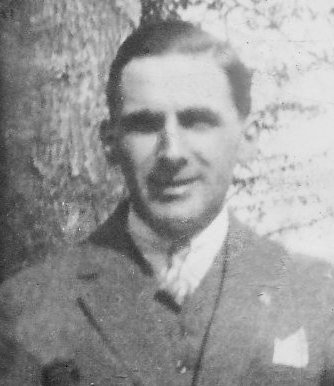
- Charles Berthelot in 1925

Personal information
- Date of birth: 19 February 1901
- Place of birth: Rennes, France
- Date of death: 13 September 1940 (aged 39)
- Place of death: Fougères, France
- Height: 1.85 m (6 ft 1 in)
- Position: Goalkeeper

Senior career*
Years	Team	Apps	(Gls)
1918–1920	Drapeau de Fougères		
1920–1924	Rennes		
1924–1932	Drapeau de Fougères		

International career
1923	France	1	(0)
- * Club domestic league appearances and goals

Charles Berthelot (19 February 1901 – 13 September 1940) was a French footballer who played as a goalkeeper for Rennes and the France national team in the early 1920s.

== Club career ==
Charles Berthelot was born in Rennes on 19 February 1901, as the son of a locally based shoe manufacturer. He began his football career in 1918, aged 17, at Drapeau de Fougères (Flag of Fougères), with whom he played for one season until 1920, when he moved to the football section of Stade Rennais.In his first season at the club, he only played one match in the regional championship, against Stade Lavallois on 12 December 1920.

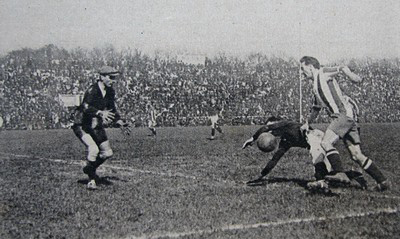
Berthelot in the 1922 Coupe de France final in front of 25,000 spectators.

In the 1921–22 season, Berthelot played a crucial role in Rennes' excellent run in the Coupe de France, which saw the Breton team reach the final after knocking out the likes of JA Saint-Ouen, Le Havre, Olympique Lillois, and Olympique de Paris, before falling in the final to Red Star (0–2). During this last match, Berthelot was unconscious for a while after hitting the post during a save.

In 1923, Berthelot helped Rennais win the Brittany Football League, and in 1924, he returned to Drapeau de Fougères, which had just been promoted to the Division d'honneur, and while there, he regularly met his former Rennes teammates. Thanks to his good performances in the Coupe de France with Fougères, he was called up by France for the second time on 13 May 1928, as a substitute goalkeeper for Stade Brest's Alex Thépot in Colombes. He stayed loyal to Fougères for eight years until 1932, when he retired, aged 31.

== International career ==
Thanks to his heroics at the Coupe de France, Berthelot was called up by France in 1923, thus becoming the first Rennes goalkeeper to do so. He made his international debut in a friendly against the Netherlands in Amsterdam on 2 April, in which he made blunders on the first three Dutch goals in an eventual 1–8 loss, and was thus never called up again.

== Death and legacy ==
Berthelot died in Fougères on 13 September 1940, at the age of 39, due to an illness.

As a tribute, the Drapeau de Fougères stadium was renamed after him in 1994, more than half a century after his death. For nearly a full century, he was the only Fougères player to have worn the jersey of the French A team, remaining so until Eduardo Camavinga made his international debut in 2019.

== Honours ==
Rennes

- Brittany Football League: 1923
- Coupe de France runner-up: 1922
