= François Hugues =

French footballer (1896-1965)

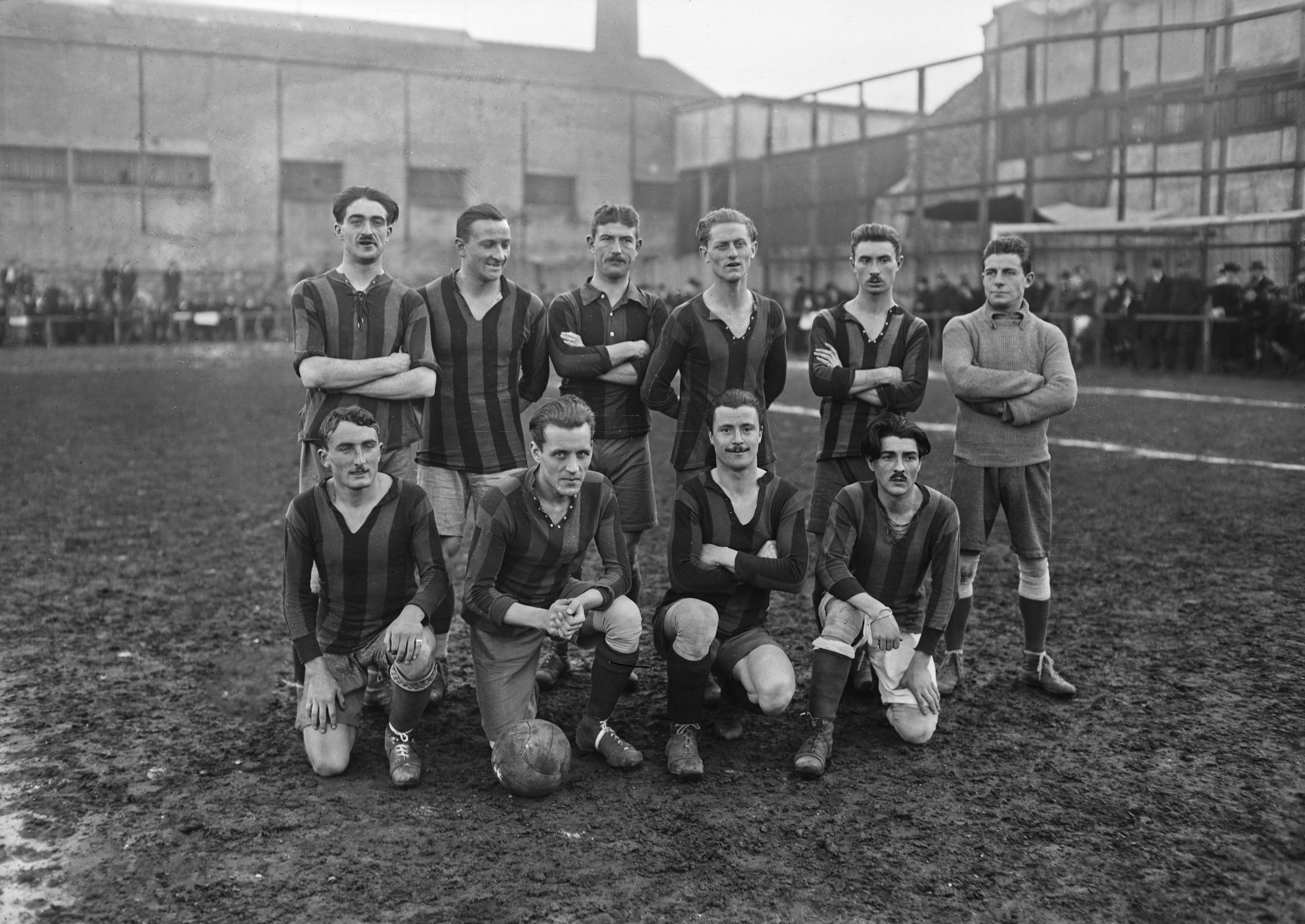

Personal information
- Full name: François Hugues
- Date of birth: 13 August 1896
- Place of birth: Paris, France
- Date of death: 16 December 1965 (aged 69)
- Place of death: Paris, France
- Position: Midfielder

Youth career
- Montmartre
- US de l'Est
- US Auteuil

Senior career*
Years	Team	Apps	(Gls)
1913–1921	Red Star FC		
1921–1922	Rennes	18	(2)
1922–1927	Red Star FC		
1927–1933	FC Lyon		
1933–1934	Suisse Paris		

International career
1919–1927	France	24	(1)

Managerial career
- 1950: SC Bel-Abbès
- * Club domestic league appearances and goals

François Hugues (13 August 1896 – 13 December 1965) was a France international football player mostly known for his international career and his time at Red Star FC, which included two stints spanning over 14 years. With Red Star, Hugues won two Coupe de France titles in 1921 and 1923. He also played for Rennes, FC Lyon, and Suisse Paris. During his time as an international, Hugues was considered one of the best French players of his generation.

== Biography ==
Born in Paris, François Hugues spent most of his football career in the French capital. In his youth, he played football in Montmartre, with US de l'Est and US Auteuil. In 1913, he joined Red Star, a club in which he remained for thirteen seasons, and with whom he realized his main achievements.

At 22, on March 9, 1919, Hugues made his debut for the French team, in a friendly match against Belgium in Brussels. He subsequently became a regular with the Blues, being selected 24 times between 1919 and 1927. In the tricolor jersey, he notably participated in the Olympic Games in Antwerp in 1920 (semi-finalist), and in the historic victory against England (2-1) in 1921. On three occasions he was named captain of the team, but the three meetings ended in as many defeats.

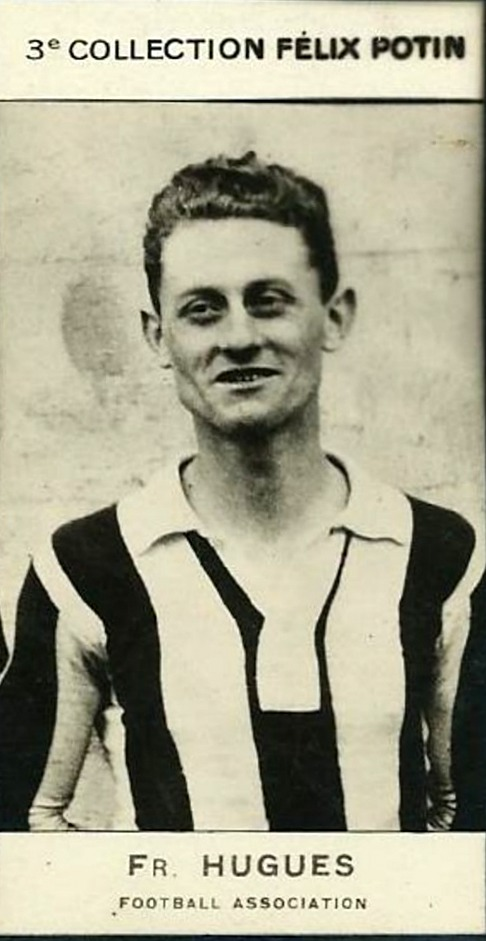
Francois Hugues

With great physical and mental qualities, as well as an excellent mind for the game, Hugues won the Coupe de France for the first time with Red Star, in 1921 against Olympique de Paris (2-1). A few weeks later, he left Paris for the provinces, joining Stade Rennes FC. He quickly settled there among the best players of the team, took the captain's armband, and became the first player wearing the Rennes colors to be selected for the French team. With him, Stade Rennes reached the final of the Coupe de France for the first time, but Hugues was beaten by his former Red Star teammates (0-2). At the end of the contest, Hughes collapsed, but was carried in triumph by some spectators celebrating him for his excellent performance.

The stay at Rennes was short-lived, as Hugues returned to Red Star for the following season. It served him well, with the Parisian club winning its third consecutive Coupe de France, this time over FC Cette (4-2). After four other seasons in the Audonian jersey, Hugues returned to the provinces in 1927, joining FC Lyon. He remained there until 1933. At 37 years old, he ended his career at US Suisse in Paris and at Suresnes.

After his retirement from playing, François Hugues embraced a coaching career, working in particular at SC Bel-Abbès in the 1950s.

== Style of Play ==
François Hugues played as a center-half and was the on-the-pitch strategist of his team. Despite his average height and a rather lean physique, he possessed sound athletic abilities and was a hard worker on the football field. Hugues was typically not regarded as the best technician on his team, but compensated for these limitations with a precise knowledge of the game and great mental qualities.
