= Maurice Gastiger =

French footballer (1896–1966)

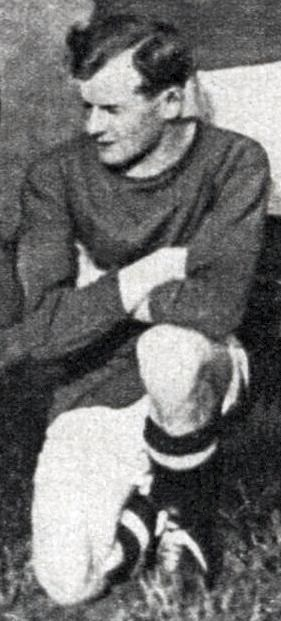
- Gastiger, 1920

Personal information
- Date of birth: 3 October 1896
- Place of birth: Cernay, Alsace-Lorraine, German Empire
- Date of death: 22 January 1966 (aged 69)
- Place of death: Rennes, France
- Position: Forward

Senior career*
Years	Team	Apps	(Gls)
1913–1920	FÉC Levallois		
1920–1928	Rennes		

International career
1914–1920	France	3	(1)
- * Club domestic league appearances and goals

Maurice Gastiger (3 October 1896 — 22 January 1966) was a French footballer who played as a forward. He is the youngest player to have scored a goal for the France national team, and the second-youngest to have played in a match for the team.

== Club career ==
Gastiger began his career with FÉC Levallois in 1913, playing with the club for seven seasons. In the 1920–21 season, Gastiger signed for Rennes. During his time at the club, Gastiger helped Rennes reach the 1922 Coupe de France Final.

== International career ==
On 8 February 1914, Gastiger made his debut for France at the 17 years, 4 months and 5 days against Luxembourg, becoming France's second-youngest player in the process, after Julien Verbrugghe. On 8 March 1914, Gastiger scored his only goal for France, in a 2–2 draw against Switzerland.

=== International goals ===
Scores and results list France's goal tally first.

#	Date	Venue	Opponent	Score	Result	Competition
1	8 March 1914	Stade de Paris, Saint-Ouen-sur-Seine, France	Switzerland	2–1	2–2	Friendly
