= Stade Rennais FC =

Association football club in France

Stade Rennais
- Full name: Stade Rennais Football Club
- Nicknames: Les Rennais (The Rennais); Les Rouge et Noirs (The Red and Blacks)
- Short name: SRFC, Rennes
- Founded: 10 March 1901; 125 years ago
- Stadium: Roazhon Park
- Capacity: 29,778
- Owner: Artémis
- President: Arnaud Pouille
- Head coach: Franck Haise
- League: Ligue 1
- 2025–26: Ligue 1, 6th of 18
- Website: www.staderennais.com
Home colours	Away colours	Third colours

Stade Rennais Football Club (French: Stade rennais Football Club, SRFC; French pronunciation: [stad ʁɛnɛ]), commonly referred to as Stade Rennais (Breton: Stad Roazhon) or simply Rennes, (Note: Rennais and Stade Rennes, used by some English-speaking media outlets and journalists, are not grammatically correct names for the club.) is a French professional football club based in Rennes, Brittany. It competes in Ligue 1, the top tier of French football, and plays its home matches at the Roazhon Park. The team's president is Olivier Cloarec, and its owner is Artémis, the holding company of businessman François Pinault.

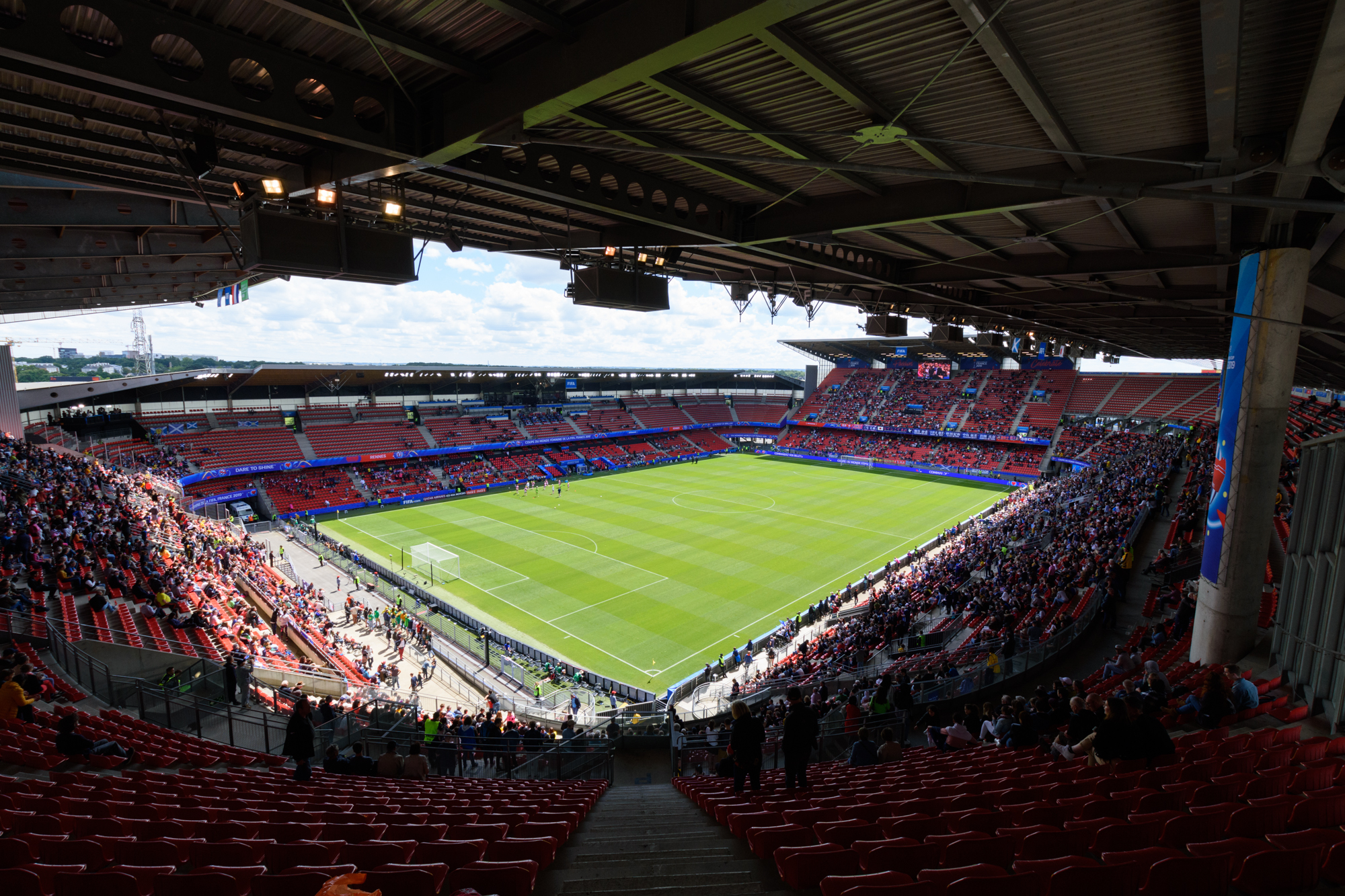
Stade Rennais FC home stadium Roazhon Park

Rennes was founded in 1901 under the name Stade Rennais and is one of the founding members of the first division of French football. Alongside Nantes, Rennes is one of the top football clubs in the region and the two are among the main clubs that contest the Derby Breton. The club's best finish in the league has been third, accomplishing this feat after the season was ended prematurely in 2019–20. Rennes has won three Coupe de France titles in 1965, 1971 and 2019. After winning the Coupe de France in 1971, Rennes changed its name to its current version, but the club's home colours have been the same since its inception, which are red, black, and white.

Rennes is known for its youth academy, known in English as the Henri Guérin Training Centre, which was formed in 2000. In 2010, the French Football Federation (FFF) recognised Rennes as having the best youth academy in the country. The cornerstone of the academy is the under-19 team, which has won the Coupe Gambardella four times in 1973, 2003, 2008 and 2025. The academy has produced several notable talents, such as Ousmane Dembélé, Yacine Brahimi, Eduardo Camavinga, Yoann Gourcuff, Yann M'Vila, Moussa Sow, Abdoulaye Doucouré, Sylvain Wiltord, Jimmy Briand, Désiré Doué and Mathys Tel.

== History ==
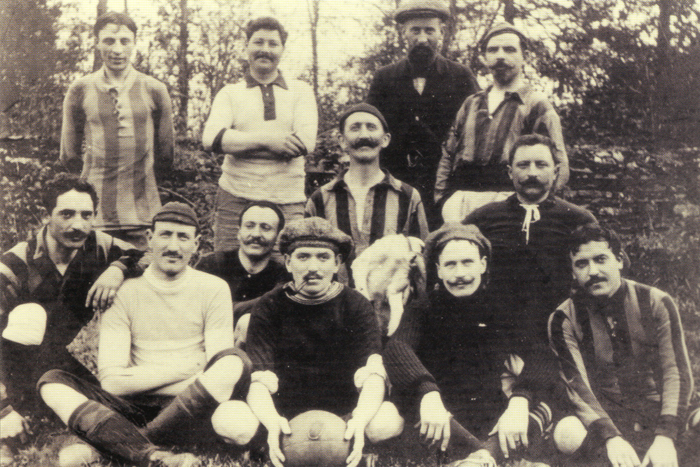
Stade Rennais in 1904

Stade Rennais Football Club was founded on 10 March 1901 by a group of former students living in Brittany. Football had quickly become widely circulated in nearby regions and it was soon brought to Brittany. The club's first match was played two weeks later against FC Rennais, which Stade lost 6–0.

In 1902, Stade Rennais joined the USFSA federation and, subsequently, became a founding member of the Ligue de Bretagne de football, a newly created regional league founded by the federation. In the second league season, the club won the competition after defeating the inaugural league winners FC Rennais 4–0 in the final.

On 4 May 1904, Stade Rennais merged with its rivals FC Rennais to form Stade Rennais Université Club, with the primary objective being to overcome the recent domination of the Ligue de Bretagne by US Saint-Malo, then known as US Saint-Servan, which fielded mostly British players. The new club adopted the colours of Rennais, which consisted of a red and black combination with black vertical stripes on the shirt. After three years of Saint-Malo dominating the league, Rennes finally eclipsed the club in 1908 under the leadership of Welsh manager Arthur Griffith. In the following season, Rennes won the league again, but in 1910 Rennes was unable to win a third, as Saint-Malo won the league by two points. The champions subsequently went on an impressive run in which it won the league for the next four seasons over.

After World War I, Rennes began focusing its efforts on winning the recently created Coupe de France. Strengthened by the arrivals of internationals Bernard Lenoble, Maurice Gastiger, Ernest Molles and captain François Hugues after the war, in the competition's fourth campaign, Rennes reached the final. In the match, the club faced two-time defending champions Red Star Olympique, which was led by attacker Paul Nicolas, defender Lucien Gamblin and goalkeeper Pierre Chayriguès. Red Star opened the scoring in the fourth minute and the match was concluded following a late goal from Raymond Sentubéry. After the disorganisation of the USFSA in 1913, Rennes joined the Ligue de l'Ouest. In 1929, Rennes departed the league after disagreeing with the increased number of games the league sought to implement in the new season. The departure led to Rennes becoming a "free agent", and the club played numerous friendly matches to compensate for the loss of league matches.

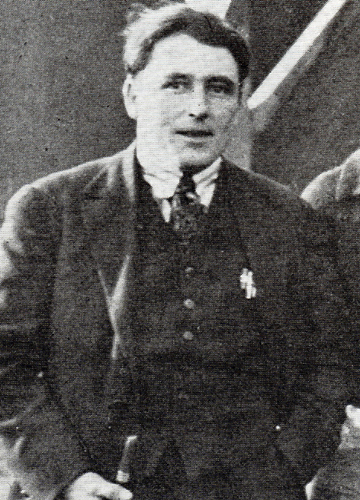
The presidency of Isidore Odorico marked the history of the club during the 1920–1930s.

In July 1930, the National Council of the French Football Federation (FFF) voted 128–20 in support of professionalism in French football. Under the leadership of club president Isidore Odorico, Rennes was among the first clubs to adopt the new statute and, subsequently, became professional and became founding members of the new league. In the league's inaugural season, Rennes finished mid-table in its group. Two years later, in 1935, the club reached the Coupe de France final for the second time. Rennes, however, lost to Marseille 3–0 after failing to overcome three first-half goals. The club's attack was also limited in the match due to being deprived of its top two attackers, Walter Kaiser and Walter Vollweiler, who were both injured. Rennes spent four more years in the first division before suffering relegation to Division 2 in the 1936–37 season. Rennes played in Division 2 before professionalism was abolished due to World War II. After the war, Rennes returned to Division 1. Led by the Austrian-born Frenchman Franz Pleyer, Rennes achieved its best finish in the league after finishing fourth in the 1948–49 campaign. Despite the domestic resurgence under Pleyer, the club struggled to maintain consistency and, in the 1950s, rotated between the first division and the second division under the watch of the Spaniard Salvador Artigas and Henri Guérin, who acted in a player-coach role.

Under the leadership of new president Louis Girard, Rennes underwent a major upheaval, which included renovations to the stadium. Girard sought to make Rennes competitive nationally and the first objective was achieved when the club earned promotion back to Division 1 in 1958. After finishing in the bottom-half of the table for six-straight seasons, Rennes, now managed by former club player Jean Prouff, finished in fourth place in the 1964–65 season. In the same season, the club earned its first major honour after winning the Coupe de France. Rennes, led by players such as Daniel Rodighiéro, Georges Lamia and Jean-Claude Lavaud defeated UA Sedan-Torcy 3–1 in the replay of the final. The first leg of the match ended 2–2, which resulted in a replay. After the cup success, Rennes played in European competition for the first time in the 1965–66 season, participating in the European Cup Winner's Cup. The club, however, lost to Czechoslovak club Dukla Prague in the first round.

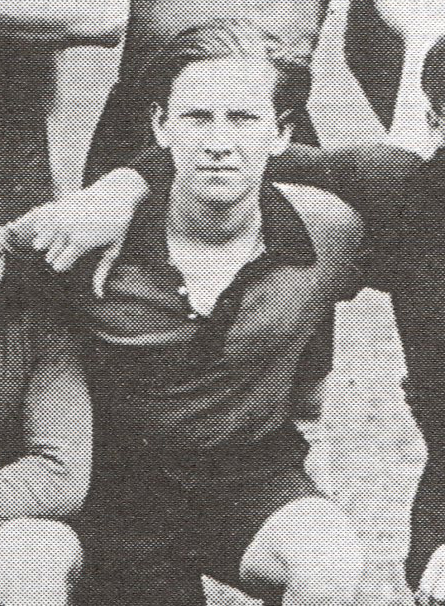
Jean Prouff, pictured in 1935, led Rennes to its major successes.

In the ensuing years, Rennes struggled in league play but performed well in the Coupe de France, reaching the semi-finals on two occasions in 1967 and 1970. In 1971, Rennes captured its second Coupe de France title after defeating Lyon 1–0 in the final, with the only goal coming from the penalty spot scored by André Guy.

On 23 May 1972, Rennes officially changed its name to its current form, Stade Rennais Football Club. After another season in charge, Prouff departed Rennes and the club entered free-fall. From 1972 to 1994, Rennes was supervised by 11 different managers and, during the years, constantly hovered between Division 1 and Division 2. In 1978, the club was on the verge of bankruptcy and, as a result, was ordered by a tribunal to sell its biggest earners and enter a policy of austerity. In the 1980s, the city's municipality gained a majority stake in the club.

In 1994, Rennes returned to Division 1 and entered a period of stability mainly due to the utilisation of the club's youth academy. Instead of entering bidding wars for players, Rennes groomed its youngsters and inserted them onto the senior team when coaches felt they were ready. This strategy proved successful with players such as Sylvain Wiltord, Jocelyn Gourvennec, and Ulrich Le Pen. In 1998, the club was sold by the municipality to retail magnate François Pinault. Pinault invested a substantial amount of funding into the club and sought to increase Rennes' production of youth talent by constructing a training centre, which was completed in 2000. Pinault also paid for a completed re-construction of the stadium and also invested in the transfer market, recruiting several players from South America, most notably Brazilian forward Lucas Severino, whom Rennes paid a record €21 million for in 2000.

The results were immediate in the decade from 2000 to 2010, with Rennes appearing in UEFA-sanctioned European competitions in five of the ten seasons. In youth production, the club produced several youth talents such as Yann M'Vila, Yacine Brahimi, Jimmy Briand and Abdoulaye Diallo, among others. In league competition, Rennes tied its best finish ever in the league by finishing fourth in 2004–05. Two seasons later, the club accomplished this feat again. In 2009, Rennes reached the Coupe de France final for the fourth time in its history. In the final, Rennes faced Breton rival Guingamp and was the heavy favourite. Despite taking the lead in the second half, however, Rennes was defeated 2–1 after Guingamp scored two goals in a ten-minute span. In 2014, Rennes made the Coupe de France final and once again their opponent was Guingamp. In a tense final, Rennes lost the match to their fierce rivals 2–0. In the 2017–18 Ligue 1 season, Rennes had one of their best campaigns in recent memory, finishing 5th and qualifying to the UEFA Europa League for the 2018–19 season.

In the following season, the 2018–19 season, Rennes had irregular form in the league, finishing tenth, but claimed its third Coupe de France win on 27 April, rallying back from two goals down to beat Paris Saint-Germain 6–5 on penalties in the final. The French Cup winners for the last four years were heavy favourites to beat Rennes having already been crowned Ligue 1 champions for the 2018–19 season on 21 April. The club also had a great Europa League campaign, where they reached the round of 16 after finishing second in the group stage. In the round of 32, they beat Real Betis 6–4 on aggregate, and in the round of 16, they were matched up with Arsenal. In the first leg on 7 March, Rennes recorded a historic 3–1 victory at home. In the second leg however, eventual finalists Arsenal won 3–0 in London and eliminated the French club.

In the 2019–20 season, Rennes finished third in Ligue 1 and qualified for 2020–21 UEFA Champions League for the first time in their history.

== Stadium ==
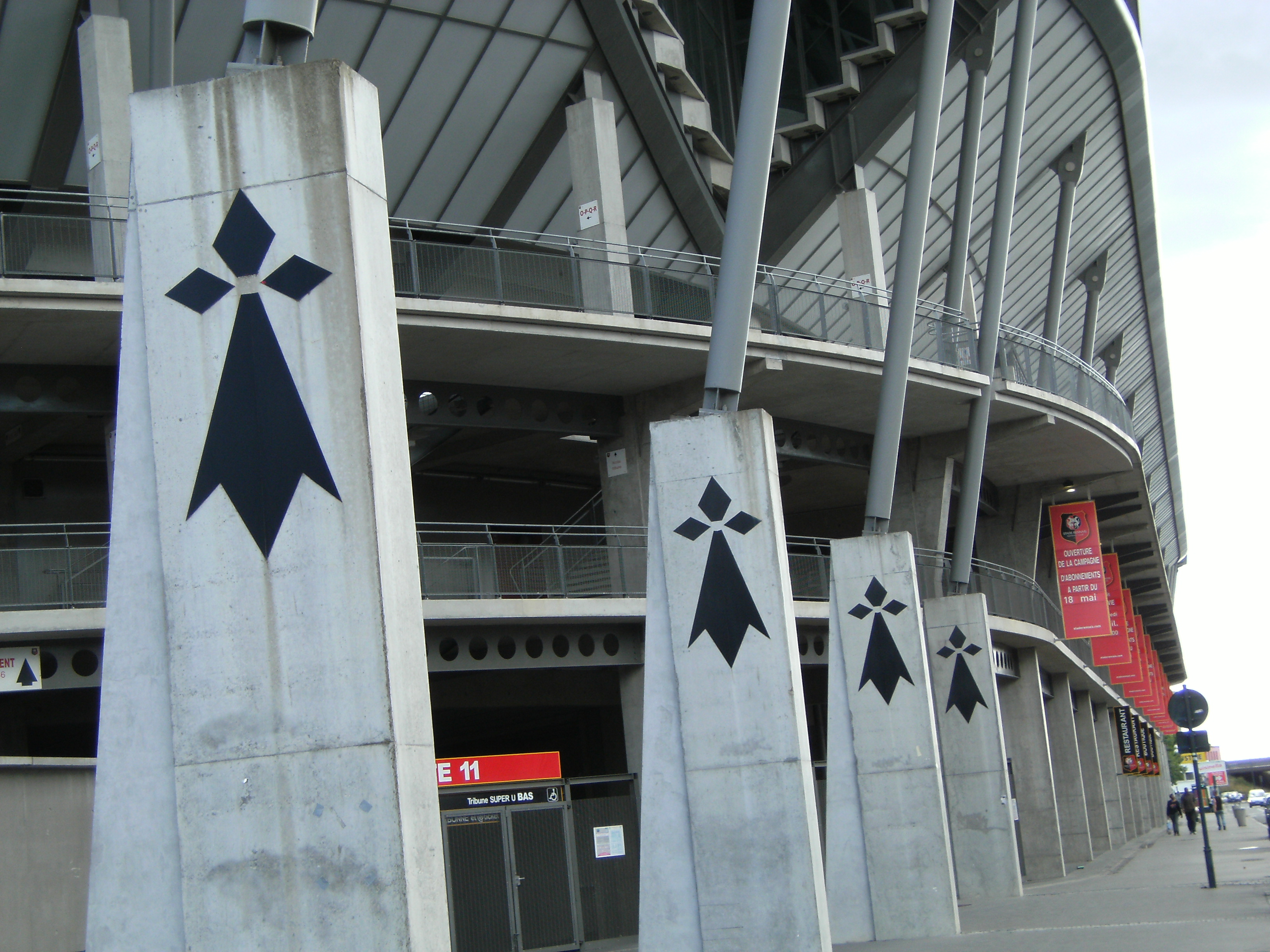
The Hermine symbols outside the Roazhon Park

Rennes has played on the land where the club's stadium, the Roazhon Park, situates itself since 1912. The Roazhon Park, then named Stade de Route de Lorient, which is its address, was constructed in 1912. The facility was inaugurated on 15 September 1912 in a match between Rennes and SA du Lycée de Rennes. The Stade de la Route de Lorient was officially inaugurated a month later when Rennes took on Racing Club de France in front of 3,000 spectators.

The Roazhon Park is owned by the city of Rennes and has undergone renovations three times, in 1955, 1983 and 1999. In 1983, the club renovated the stadium in an attempt to resemble the Olympiastadion in Munich. After nearly four years of renovation, the new stadium was unveiled on 7 March 1987. In 1999, the new renovations, which were designed by architect Bruno Gaudin, cost €37.3 million and took four years to complete. The stadium's inauguration was celebrated twice: in a match between France and Bosnia and Herzegovina in August 2004, and another football match contesting by Rennes and Metz two months later. The current capacity of the stadium is 29,778.

=== Training centre ===
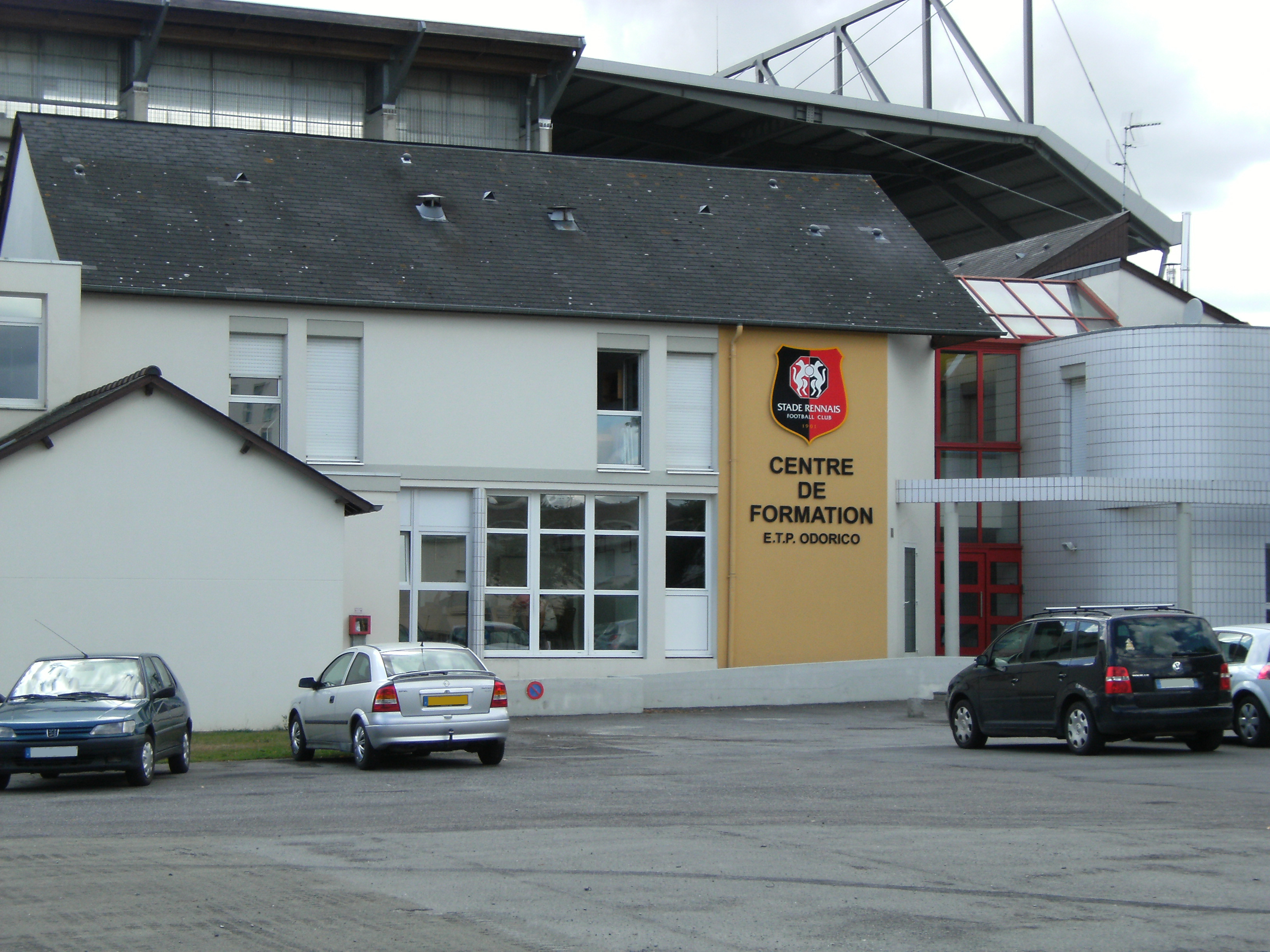
The entrance to the École Technique Privée Odorico, a section of the Stade Rennais youth academy

The Centre d'entraînement Henri-Guérin (Henri-Guérin Training Center), colloquially known as La Piverdière, was inaugurated in June 2000. Named for former club player and manager Henri Guérin, La Piverdière is located on the outskirts of Rennes just southwest of Roazhon Park. The centre hosts the senior team's training sessions, as well as the club's reserve and youth teams. In 2007, La Piverdière became the home of the club's administrative and business headquarters.

Since its inception, La Piverdière has become reputed for its consistent production of youth talent, bringing through players that have become household names at the international level. In that time, the club's youth system has made up most of the club's first team. Current first-team players Eduardo Camavinga and Joris Gnagnon were graduates of the academy. Rennes has been awarded the honour of having the best youth academy in France.

Rennes has won the Coupe Gambardella, the under-19 national youth competition, three times, in 1973, 2003 and 2008. In 2003, the team that won was anchored by Yoann Gourcuff and Marveaux. Gourcuff went on to win both the UNFP Player of the Year and French Player of the Year awards and established himself as a French international. Marveaux graduated from the academy after the Gambardella triumph and went on to appear in over 100 matches for Rennes. He had his best season in the 2009–10 season, appearing in 38 matches and scoring 12 goals. In 2008, the team that won the competition was composed of Brahimi, M'Vila, Souprayen, Yohann Lasimant, Quentin Rouger, Kévin Théophile-Catherine, and Damien Le Tallec. Six of the seven players made appearances with the first-team. Le Tallec moved to German club Borussia Dortmund before he could make an appearance.

== Supporters ==
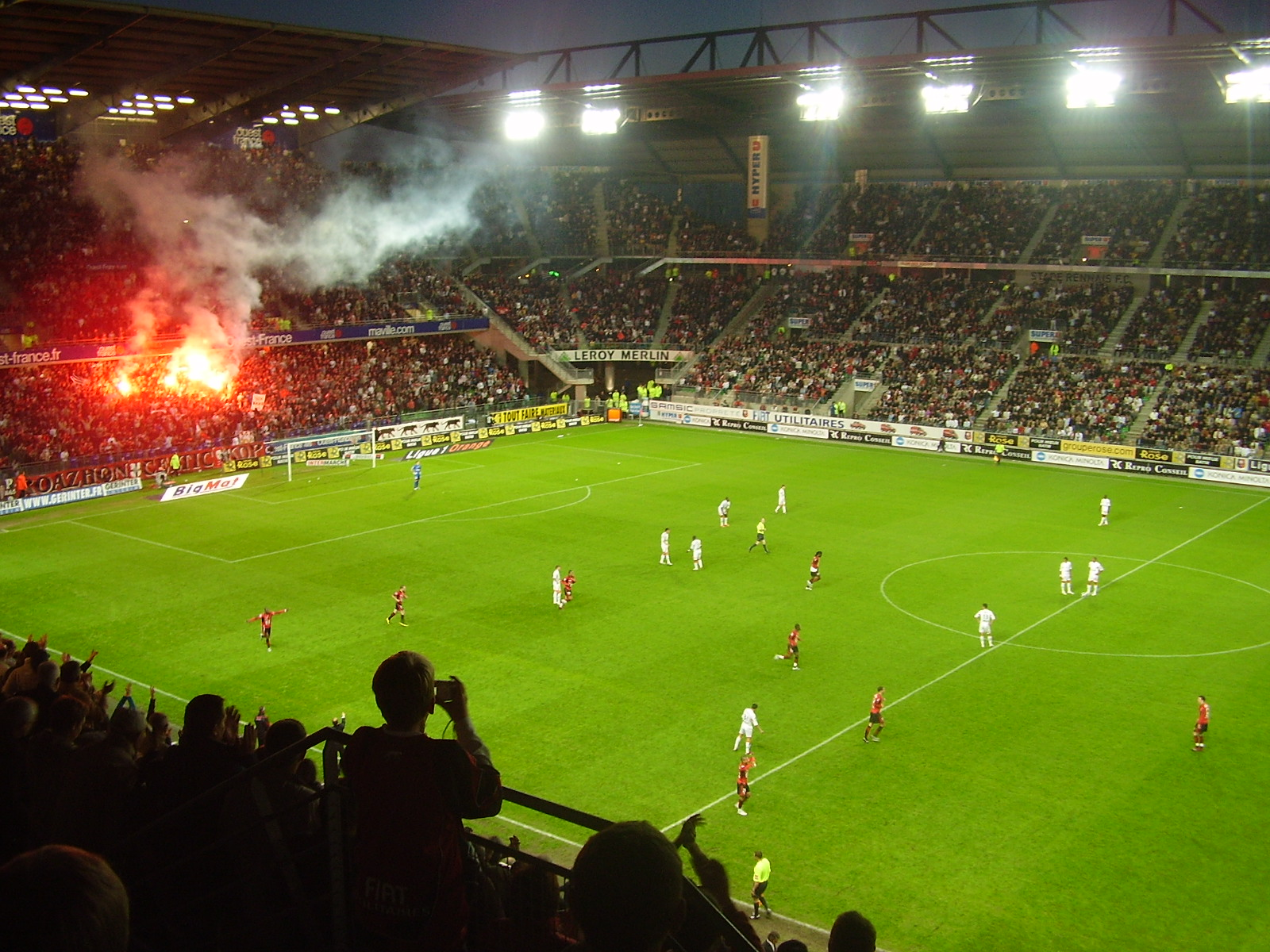
Flares of the Roazhon Celtic Kop at the Roazhon Park

Rennes have several supporter groups associated with the club, ranging from groups of senior supporters to ultras. The oldest, most structured and frequented is Allez Rennes. The group was founded in 1962 and together with Les Socios, founded in 1992, is the largest group of traditional supporters.

The section of the stadium popularly called Tribune Mordelles is occupied by the Roazhon Celtic Kop (RCK). Although the group was founded in 1991, its roots date back to 1987 when a group of supporters known as Ultras Roazhon was formed. The RCK was formed by three young supporters who decided to establish the Mordelles stand as the true hot spot of the stadium. The group marks its presence not only through continuous singing and the use of flares, but also through numerous tifos and choreographic celebrations. The Breton identity is regularly displayed and the use of Celtic symbols is frequent. A special feat of the RCK is that the group is responsible for having made the largest Gwenn-ha-du in history measuring 270 square metres. It was displayed at the Mordelles stand during the 1994–95 season.

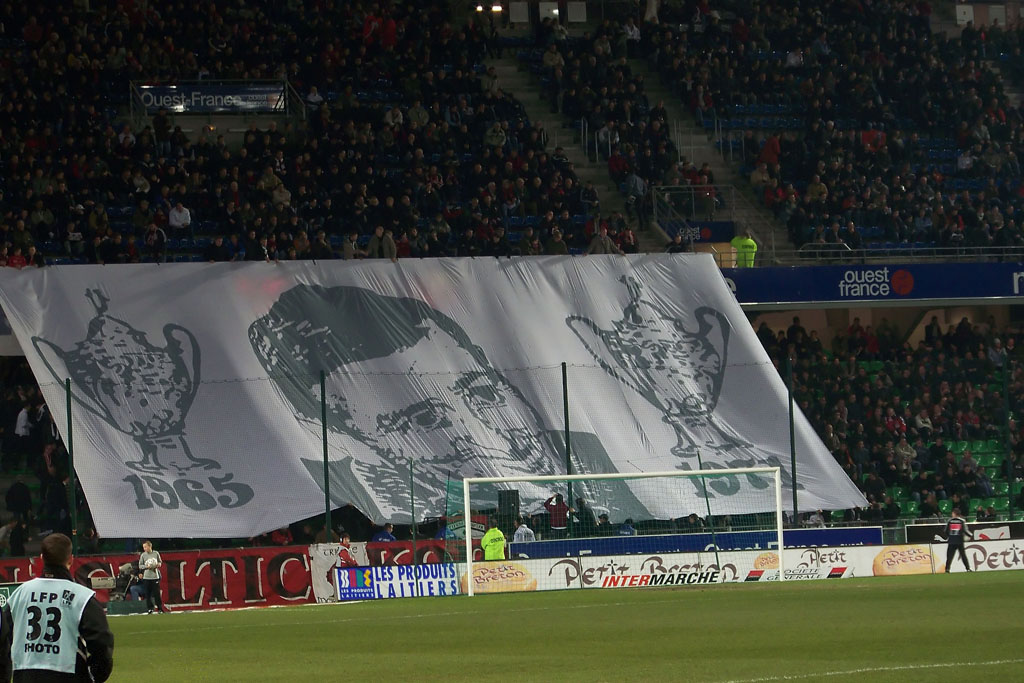
The RCK giving homage to the deceased former player Jean Prouff in 2008

The RCK functions as an unconditional supporters' group present at all matches, including those at European level, and gathers supporters mainly of the ultra-mentality, but also holds on to its values describe by the group as Amitié, Respect et Fête (Friendship, Respect and Party). The Kop keeps an open attitude towards those supporters of Rennes who share them. The group has taken a strong position against "football business", the suppression of the ultra-movement and racism. Although the group is not officially political, it regularly manifests anti-fascism. The RCK is a member of the RSRA (Réseau Supporter de Résistance Antiraciste), a French network of football supporter groups against racism, and involved in Fare, a European network of football supporter groups against racism and discrimination.

Another major supporter group of the club is the Section Roazhon Pariz. It is a section of the RCK that is situated in Paris. The group supports the team at important away matches, such as those against Lyon and Paris Saint-Germain. The RCK makes no attempt to hide its chaotic and festive appearance. In 2003, a second group of ultras, the Breizh Stourmer ("Breton Warriors") was formed through a break with the RCK. The group was created around the idea of a small, strong core of supporters and chose to situate themselves on the opposite side of the RCK. The Breizh Stourmer has been accused by elements of the RCK for certain members holding extreme-right views. Violent clashes between radical members of the two groups have occurred. The main rival of the RCK has, however, not been the Breizh Stourmer, but for many years, the Brigade Loire, a supporters' group of Rennes' rival club Nantes. The Breizh Stourmer has since dissolved. In 2008, a new group of supporters, the Unvez Kelt (UK) ("Celtic Unity"), was founded. The group was initially refused by the club as an official group, however, with the help of Les Socios, it was finally accepted. Failing to establish itself and after several problems, among them a fire that destroyed its premises in November 2010, clashes with the National Police and incidents resulting in several of its members becoming arrested during an away match at Auxerre in 2012, the Unvez Kelt decided to dissolve in 2012.

== Players ==
=== Current squad ===
As of 2 September 2026

Note: Flags indicate national team as defined under FIFA eligibility rules; some limited exceptions apply. Players may hold more than one non-FIFA nationality.

No.	Pos.	Nation	Player
4	DF	ENG	Charlie Cresswell (on loan from Toulouse)
5	DF	POR	Gonçalo Oliveira
6	MF	FRA	Djaoui Cissé
9	FW	FRA	Esteban Lepaul
10	MF	MTQ	Ludovic Blas
11	FW	JOR	Musa Al-Taamari
12	FW	ESP	Eliezer Mayenda
14	DF	USA	Bryan Reynolds
16	GK	FRA	Nicolas Lemaître
17	MF	POL	Sebastian Szymański
18	DF	CMR	Aboubakar Nagida
21	MF	FRA	Valentin Rongier (captain)
22	FW	SEN	Boulaye Dia (on loan from Lazio)

No.	Pos.	Nation	Player
24	DF	FRA	Anthony Rouault
26	DF	FRA	Quentin Merlin
28	MF	FRA	Adrien Thomasson
30	GK	FRA	Brice Samba
35	FW	ECU	Elías Legendre
45	MF	FRA	Mahdi Camara
48	DF	MAR	Abdelhamid Aït Boudlal
60	GK	ALG	Kilian Belazzoug
65	MF	GAB	Henrick Do Marcolino
70	FW	FRA	Arnaud Nordin
90	FW	SEN	Issa Soumaré
95	MF	POL	Przemysław Frankowski (on loan from Galatasaray)
—	MF	BEL	Ayanda Sishuba

=== Out on loan ===
Note: Flags indicate national team as defined under FIFA eligibility rules; some limited exceptions apply. Players may hold more than one non-FIFA nationality.

No.	Pos.	Nation	Player
—	GK	FRA	Mathys Silistrie (at Quevilly-Rouen until 30 June 2027)
—	DF	SEN	Mikayil Faye (at 1. FC Nürnberg until 30 June 2027)
—	DF	FRA	Rayan Bamba (at Le Mans until 30 June 2027)
—	DF	GHA	Alidu Seidu (at Nice until 30 June 2027)
—	MF	CIV	Seko Fofana (at Porto until 30 June 2027)
—	MF	WAL	Jordan James (at Wolverhampton Wanderers until 30 June 2027)

No.	Pos.	Nation	Player
—	MF	FIN	Glen Kamara (at Queens Park Rangers until 30 June 2027)
—	MF	FRA	Paolo Limon (at Villefranche until 30 June 2027)
—	FW	FRA	Nordan Mukiele (at Montpellier until 30 June 2027)
—	FW	FRA	Lucas Rosier (at Concarneau until 30 June 2027)
—	FW	MAR	Yassir Zabiri (at Racing Santander until 30 June 2027)

=== Retired numbers ===
No.	Player	Nationality	Position	Rennes debut	Last match
29	Romain Danzé	France	Right back	4 November 2006	7 January 2018

=== Notable players ===
Below are the notable former and current players who have represented Rennes in league and international competition since the club's foundation in 1901.

For a complete list of former Stade Rennais players with a Wikipedia article, see here.

- (Algeria) Ramy Bensebaini
- (Algeria) Mahi Khennane
- (Algeria) Raïs M'Bolhi
- (Algeria) Mehdi Zeffane
- (Belgium) Jérémy Doku
- (Brazil) Luis Fabiano
- (Brazil) Raphinha
- (Bulgaria) Georgi Ivanov
- (Cameroon) Stéphane Mbia
- (Colombia) Víctor Montaño
- (Colombia) Juan Fernando Quintero
- (Czech Republic) Petr Čech
- (France) Dominique Arribagé
- (France) Jean-Luc Arribart
- (France) Benjamin André
- (France) Hatem Ben Arfa
- (France) Yoann Bigné
- (France) Yves Boutet
- (France) Jimmy Briand
- (France) Jean-Pierre Brucato
- (France) Eduardo Camavinga
- (France) Louis Cardiet
- (France) René Cédolin
- (France) Benoît Costil
- (France) Romain Danzé
- (France) Ousmane Dembélé
- (France) Étienne Didot
- (France) Julien Escudé
- (France) Bernard Goueffic
- (France) Yoann Gourcuff
- (France) Jocelyn Gourvennec
- (France) Clément Grenier
- (France) Pierrick Hiard
- (France) Laurent Huard
- (France) Cyril Jeunechamp
- (France) Raymond Keruzoré
- (France) Jean-Claude Lavaud
- (France) Serge Lenoir
- (France) Serge Le Dizet
- (France) Jérôme Leroy
- (France) Steve Mandanda
- (France) Bertrand Marchand
- (France) Olivier Monterrubio
- (France) Steven Nzonzi
- (France) Jean Prouff
- (France) Anthony Réveillère
- (France) Robert Rico
- (France) Daniel Rodighiéro
- (France) Olivier Sorlin
- (France) Mikaël Silvestre
- (France) Mathys Tel
- (France) Sylvain Wiltord
- (Ghana) Asamoah Gyan
- (Israel) Vicky Peretz
- (Ivory Coast) Jérémie Boga
- (Ivory Coast) Laurent Pokou
- (Mali) Abdoulaye Doucouré
- (Morocco) Nayef Aguerd
- (Mozambique) Mexer
- (Nigeria) John Utaka
- (Poland) Kamil Grosicki
- (Senegal) Lamine Diatta
- (Senegal) Kader Mangane
- (Senegal) Édouard Mendy
- (Senegal) M'Baye Niang
- (Senegal) Ismaïla Sarr
- (Senegal) Moussa Sow
- (Serbia) Nemanja Matić
- (Romania) Corneliu Papură
- (Spain) Salvador Artigas
- (Sweden) Petter Hansson
- (Sweden) Kim Källström
- (Sweden) Ola Toivonen
- (Switzerland) Gelson Fernandes
- (Switzerland) Alexander Frei
- (Tunisia) Wahbi Khazri
- (United States) Carlos Bocanegra
- (United States) Jordan Pefok

== Management and coaching ==
Club officials

Position	Staff
President	Arnaud Pouille
Technical Director	Loic Desire
Head coach	Franck Haise
Assistant coach	Lilian Nalis
Assistant coach	Johann Ramaré
Goalkeeper coach	Hervé Sekli
Youth academy director	Denis Arnaud

=== Coaching history ===
Coaches since 1906 and later to the accession to professional status in 1932, with the exception of 1939–1941, where the Stade Rennais reverted to amateur status, and 1942–1944, where no coach was appointed by the board, and 1945 where the club didn't compete in any competition.

Dates	Coach
1906–09	Arthur Griffith
1920–22	George Scoones
1930–31	Trojanek
1932–33	Kálmán Székány
1933	Phillip McCloy
1933–36	Josef Pepi Schneider
1936–41	Jean Batmale
1941–42	Émile Scharwath
1942–45	Jean Batmale
1945–52	François Pleyer
1952–55	Salvador Artigas
1955–61	Henri Guérin
1961–64	Antoine Cuissard
1964–72	Jean Prouff
1972–74	René Cédolin
1974–76	Antoine Cuissard
1976–77	Claude Dubaële
1977–79	Alain Jubert
1979–82	Pierre Garcia
1982–84	Jean Vincent
1984–86	Pierre Mosca
1987	Patrick Rampillon
1987–91	Raymond Kéruzoré
1 July 1991 – 30 June 1993	Didier Notheaux
1993–96	Michel Le Millinaire
1 July 1996 – 30 June 1997	Yves Colleu
1 July 1997 – 30 June 1998	Guy David
1 July 1998 – 30 June 2001	Paul Le Guen
1 July 2001 – 30 June 2002	Christian Gourcuff
1 July 2002 – 13 October 2002	Philippe Bergeroo
14 October 2002 – 30 June 2003	Vahid Halilhodžić
1 July 2003 – 30 June 2006	László Bölöni
1 July 2006 – 16 December 2007	Pierre Dréossi
17 December 2007 – 30 June 2009	Guy Lacombe
1 July 2009 – 30 June 2013	Frédéric Antonetti
1 July 2013 – 20 January 2016	Philippe Montanier
20 January 2016 – 30 June 2016	Rolland Courbis
1 July 2016 – 8 November 2017	Christian Gourcuff
8 November 2017 – 3 December 2018	Sabri Lamouchi
3 December 2018 – 1 March 2021	Julien Stéphan
4 March 2021 – 19 November 2023	Bruno Génésio
19 November 2023 – 7 November 2024	Julien Stéphan
11 November 2024 – 30 January 2025	Jorge Sampaoli
30 January 2025 – 9 February 2026	Habib Beye
18 February 2026 – present	Franck Haise

== Honours ==
=== League ===
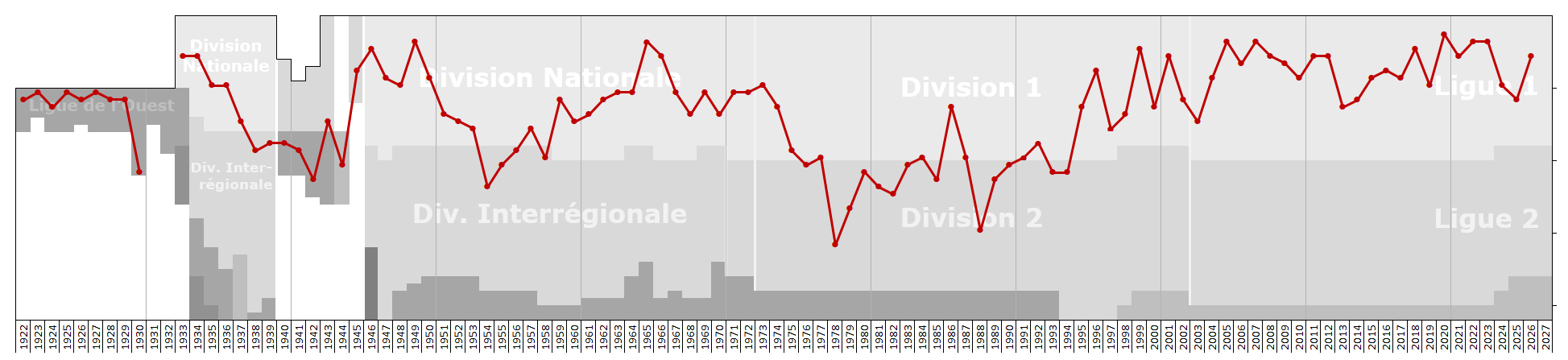
Historical league performance chart of Stade Rennais FC

- Ligue 2:
  - Champions: 1955–56, 1982–83

=== Cups ===
- Coupe de France:
  - Winners: 1964–65, 1970–71, 2018–19
  - Runners-up: 1921–22, 1934–35, 2008–09, 2013–14
- Coupe de la Ligue:
  - Runners-up: 2012–13
- Trophée des Champions:
  - Winners: 1971
  - Runners-up: 1965, 2019

=== Europe ===
- UEFA Intertoto Cup:
  - Joint Winners: 2008

=== U19 ===
- Coupe Gambardella:
  - Champions: 1973, 2003, 2008, 2025

== Bibliography ==
- Grant, Jarvie (1999). Sport in the Making of Celtic Cultures (Sport and Nation). Leicester University. ISBN 0-7185-0129-2.
- Keltz, Benjamin (2012). Supporters du Stade rennais: 100 ans de passion Route de Lorient (in French). Saint-Thonan: Les Éditions du coin de la rue. ISBN 9782954252100.
