= Pierre Chayriguès =

French footballer (1892-1965)

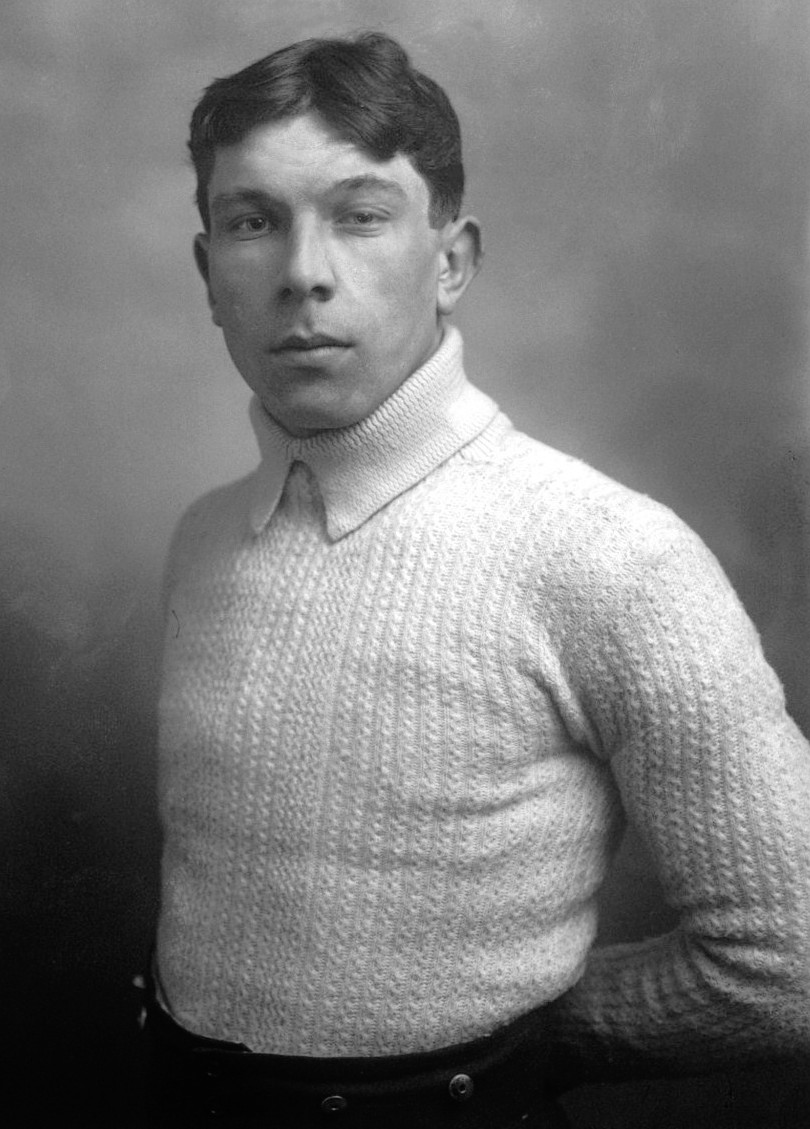
- Chayriguès in 1913

Personal information
- Date of birth: 1 May 1892
- Place of birth: Paris, France
- Date of death: 19 March 1965 (aged 72)
- Place of death: Levallois-Perret, France
- Position: Goalkeeper

Senior career*
Years	Team	Apps	(Gls)
- C.A Socialiste de Levallois
- F.E.C. Levallois
1908–1910	US Clichy		
1910–1925	Red Star		

International career
1911–1925	France	21	(0)

Managerial career
- 1949–1956: Avranches
- * Club domestic league appearances and goals

Pierre Chayriguès (2 May 1892 – 19 March 1965) was a French footballer who played as a goalkeeper. He was part of France national team at the 1924 Summer Olympics.

He was the first prominent French goalkeeper and is still today the youngest goalkeeper at the age of 19 to represent France. In 1913, he was approached by Tottenham Hotspur F.C.
