= Charles Allé =

French footballer (1904–1994)

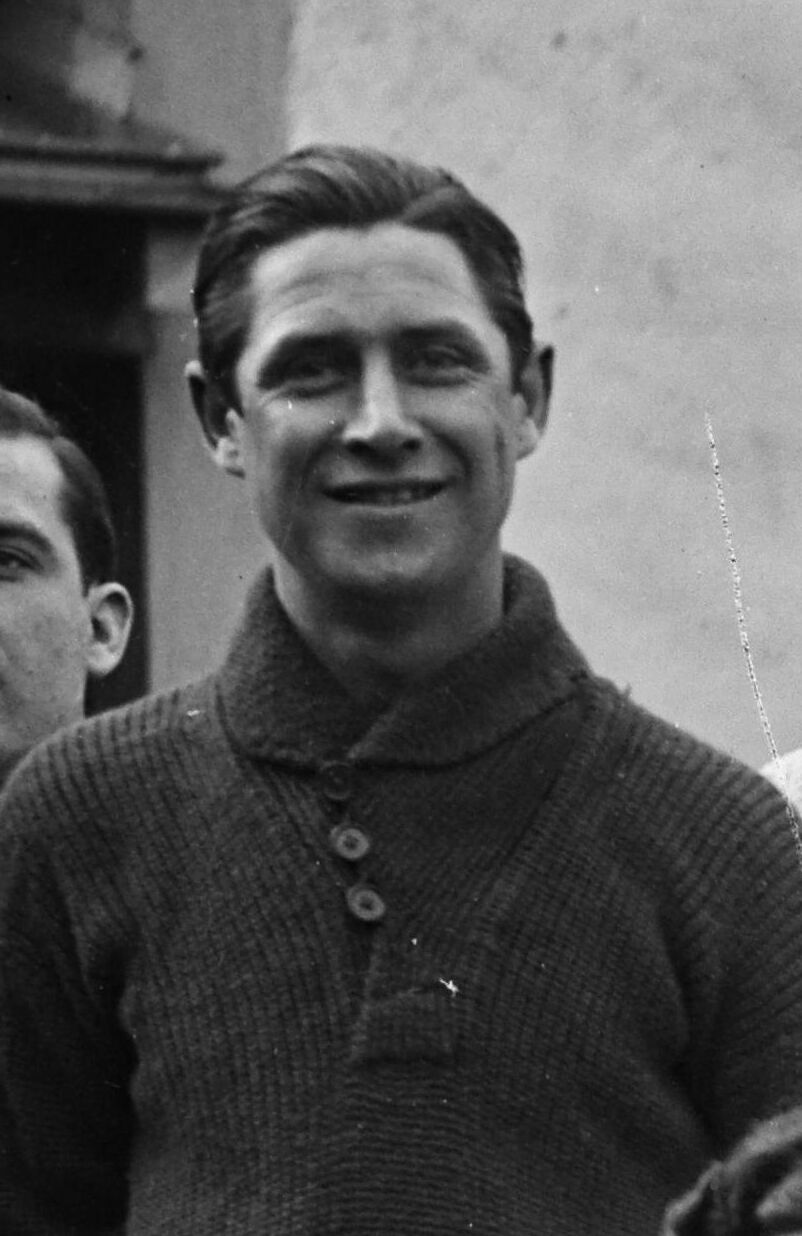
- Allé in 1930

Personal information
- Date of birth: 3 July 1904
- Place of birth: Oran, French Algeria
- Date of death: 15 September 1994 (aged 90)
- Place of death: 6th arrondissement of Marseille, France
- Height: 1.81 m (5 ft 11 in)
- Position: Goalkeeper

Senior career*
| Years | Team | Apps | (Gls) |
| 1918–1920 | Ideal Club Oranais | | |
| 1920–1921 | FC Oranais | | |
| 1921–1925 | GC Oranais | | |
| 1925–1934 | Olympique de Marseille | | |
| 1934–1939 | CSCL de Marseille | | |

International career
| 1929 | France | 1 | (0) |
- * Club domestic league appearances and goals

Charles Allé (3 July 1904 – 15 September 1994) was a French footballer who played as a goalkeeper for Olympique de Marseille and the French national team between 1926 and 1934.

== Playing career ==
Born on 3 July 1904 in Oran, Algeria, Allé began his football career at his hometown club Ideal Club Oranais in 1918, after the end of the First World War, remaining there for two years, until 1920, when he joined FC Oranais, with whom he played one season, after which he joined GC Oranais, where he stayed for four years, until 1925, when he was signed by Olympique de Marseille. He was a goalkeeper with acrobatic flexibility, a sure eye, and impeccable positioning, who excelled in good horizontal, vertical and lateral passes on the ball. In his first season at the club, OM won the Coupe de France in 1926 after beating Valentigney 4–1 in the final, but he was not directly involved in this success, remaining at the bench as the replacement goalkeeper for Paul Seitz.

Together with Edouard Crut, Jean Boyer, and Jules Dewaquez, he was a member of the OM team coached by Victor Gibson that won the 1927 Coupe de France final, helping his side keep a clean-sheet in a 3–0 win over Quevilly. Allé also played a crucial role in the OM team that won the 1929 French Amateur Championship, beating Club Français 3–2 in the final on 28 April.

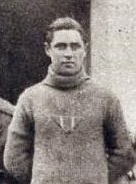
Allé in 1931.

In the following month, on 26 May 1929, the 24-year-old Allé earned his first (and only) international cap for France in a friendly match against Belgium at Stade Vélodrome de Rocourt, conceding four goals in an eventual 4–1 loss. In his last seasons at OM, the club finished as runner-up in the inaugural edition of Ligue 1 in 1932–33 and reached the 1934 Coupe de France final, which ended in a 2–1 loss to Sète.

He remained loyal to OM for nine years, from 1925 to 1934, playing 104 official matches for the first time and 15 for the reserve team. After leaving OM, he played a further five seasons at CS Crédit Lyonnais de Marseille (CSCL de Marseille), with whom he won the Coupe de Provence in 1936, and where he retired in 1939, aged 34.

== Death and legacy ==
Allé died in 6th arrondissement of Marseille on 15 September 1994, at the age of 90. He was the first OM player to have a street named after him in the 8th arrondissement of Marseille on 12 May 2011, an initiate promoted by his son Paul, a renowned Marseille painter.

== Honours ==
Olympique de Marseille

- Coupe de France: 1927
- French Amateur Championship: 1929
- Ligue 1 runner-up: 1932–33

CSCL de Marseille

- Coupe de Provence: 1936
