= Louis Subrini =

French footballer (1901–1978)

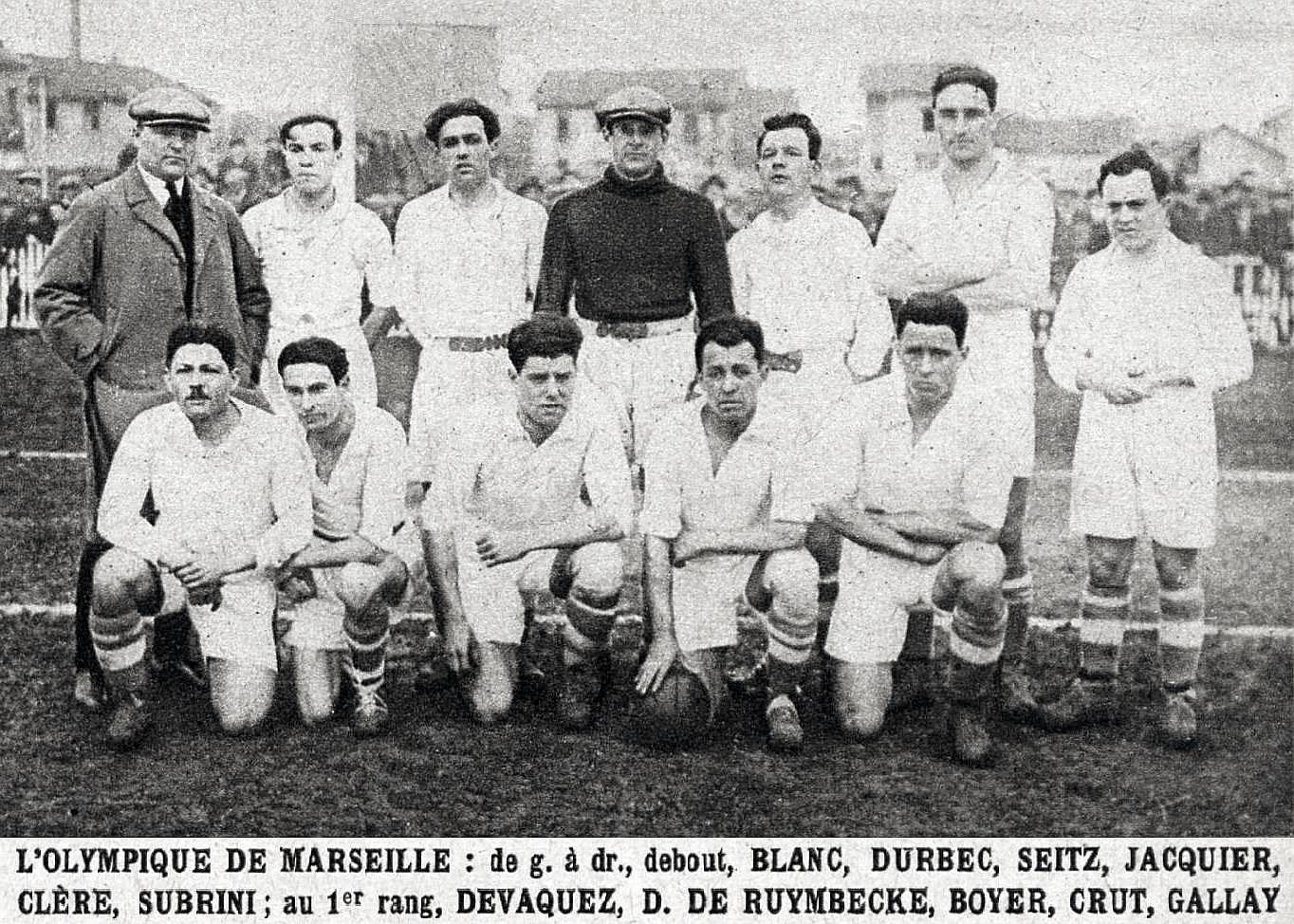
- Subrini (standing, first from right) with the Olympique de Marseille team in March 1926

Personal information
- Date of birth: 10 October 1901
- Place of birth: Ajaccio, France
- Date of death: 28 July 1978 (aged 76)
- Place of death: Marseille, France
- Height: 1.55 m (5 ft 1 in)
- Position: Midfielder

Senior career*
Years	Team	Apps	(Gls)
1916–1923	SA Provençaux		
1923–1926	Olympique de Marseille	46	(11)
1926–1928	SA Provençaux		
1928–1929	Olympique de Marseille (reserves)		
- * Club domestic league appearances and goals

Louis Subrini (10 October 1901 – 28 July 1978) was a French footballer who played as a midfielder for Olympique de Marseille in the mid-1920s.

== Career ==
Born in Ajaccio on 10 October 1901, Subrini began his career at his hometown club SA Provençaux in 1916, aged 15, with whom he played for seven years, until 1923, when he joined Olympique de Marseille. In the round of 32 of the 1923–24 Coupe de France, he scored a hat-trick in a 9–0 trashing of Scouts Gapençais.

Together with Ernest Clère, Jean Boyer, and Jules Dewaquez, Subrini was a member of the OM team coached by Victor Gibson that won two Coupe de France titles in 1924 and 1926, assisting Édouard Crut for the opening goal of a 3–2 win over Sète in the former, and helping his side to a 4–1 win over Valentigney in the latter. The following day, the journalists of the French newspaper Le Miroir des sports stated that "the little Subrini was the wisest of them, and proved as useful in defense as Gallay was in attack". He stayed at OM for four years, from 1923 to 1927, scoring a total of 11 goals in 46 official matches.

== Death ==
Subrini died in Marseille on 28 July 1978, at the age of 76.

== Honours ==
Olympique de Marseille

- Coupe de France: 1924, 1926
