= Jean Jacquier =

French footballer (1897–1981)

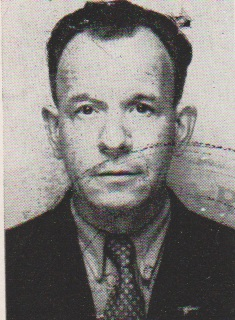
- Jacquier

Personal information
- Full name: Jean Marius Jacquier
- Date of birth: 3 September 1897
- Place of birth: Marseille, France
- Date of death: 13 August 1981 (aged 83)
- Place of death: Marseille, Franc
- Height: 1.64 m (5 ft 5 in)
- Position: Defender

Senior career*
Years	Team	Apps	(Gls)
1913–1932	Olympique de Marseille	145	(24)
1932–1940	Olympique de Marseille (reserves)		
- * Club domestic league appearances and goals

Jean Jacquier (3 September 1897 – 13 August 1981) was a French footballer who played as a defender for Olympique de Marseille in the 1920s. A historical member of OM in the inter-war period, he spent his entire career there, thus being part of the one-club men group.

== Career ==
Born in Marseille on 3 September 1897, Jacquier began his football career in 1913, aged 16, with his hometown club Olympique de Marseille. He eventually established himself as an undisputed starter in the team, playing a crucial role in helping OM reach the final of the 1919 USFSA Football Championship, scoring a consolation goal in a 4–1 loss to Le Havre.

Together with Ernest Clère, Jean Boyer, and Jules Dewaquez, he was a member of the OM team coached by Victor Gibson that won three Coupe de France titles in 1924, 1926, and 1927, starting in all the finals as his side defeated Sète (3–2), Valentigney (4–1), and Quevilly (3–0), respectively. Jacquier is thus one of the few players who won three Coupe de France titles. After the 1927 final, the journalists of the French newspaper L'Auto (the forerunner of L'Équipe) stated that he was "decisive and opportunistic, providing great service to his team".

Jacquier also helped OM win the 1929 French Amateur Championship, beating Club Français 3–2 in the final on 28 April, even though he "played many times in a panic". He stayed at OM for nearly two decades, from 1913 to 1932, scoring a total of 24 goals in 145 official matches.

== Honours ==
Olympique de Marseille

- Coupe de France:
  - Champions (3): 1924, 1926, and 1927
- French Amateur Championship
  - Champions (1): 1929
