= Adolphe Michel =

French footballer

Personal information
- Place of birth: France
- Position: Midfielder

Senior career*
Years	Team	Apps	(Gls)
1915–1924	Olympique de Marseille	54	(13)
- * Club domestic league appearances and goals

Adolphe Michel was a French footballer who played as a midfielder for Olympique de Marseille from 1915 until 1924. A historical member of OM in the inter-war period, he spent his entire career there, thus being part of the so-called one-club men group.

== Career ==
Michel joined the ranks of Olympique de Marseille in 1915, helping OM reach the final of the 1919 USFSA Football Championship, which ended in a 4–1 loss to Le Havre.

Together with Ernest Clère, Jean Boyer, and Jules Dewaquez, he was a member of the OM team coached by Victor Gibson that won the Coupe de France in 1924, beating Sète 3–2 in the final. The following day, the journalists of the French newspaper L'Auto (the future L'Équipe) stated that Michel, along with Douglas De Ruymbeke, was OM's most dangerous player. He remained loyal to OM for nine years, from 1915 until 1924, scoring a total of 13 goals in 54 official matches.

== Honours ==
Olympique de Marseille

- USFSA Football Championship:
  - Runner-up (1): 1919
- Coupe de France:
  - Champions (1): 1924
