= Maurice Gallay =

French footballer (1902–1982)

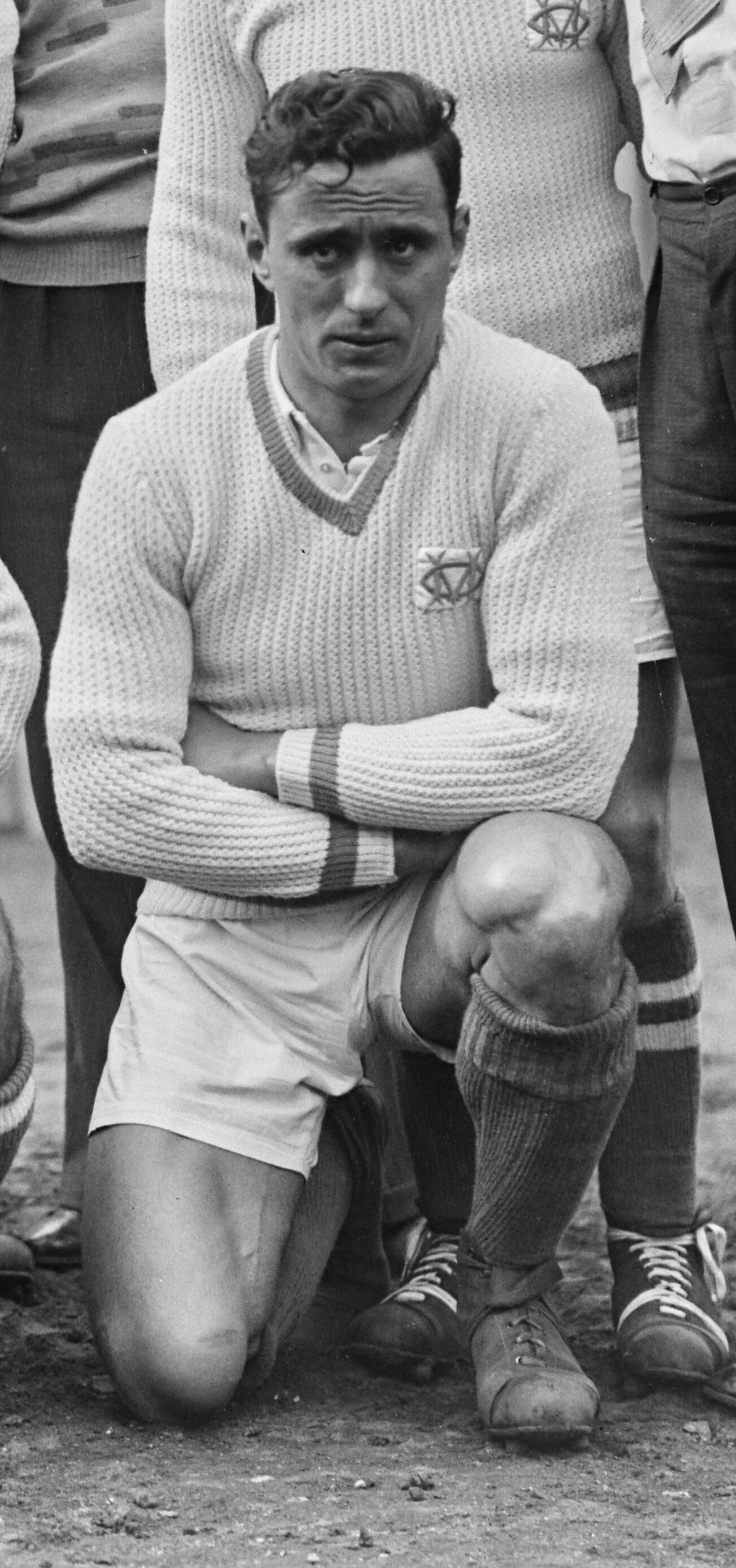
- Gallay in 1930

Personal information
- Birth name: Marius Gallay
- Date of birth: 25 December 1902
- Place of birth: Les Eaux-Vives, Geneva, Switzerland
- Date of death: 15 August 1982 (aged 79)
- Place of death: Marseille, France
- Position: Forward

Senior career*
Years	Team	Apps	(Gls)
1921–1922	FC Genève		
1922–1923	Servette		
1923–1924	Lyon OU		
1924–1925	Sète		
1925–1934	Olympique de Marseille		

International career
1926–1929	France	13	(1)
- * Club domestic league appearances and goals

Marius Gallay, better known as Maurice Gallay (25 December 1902 – 15 August 1982), was a French footballer who played as a defender for Olympique de Marseille and the French national team in the 1920s.

== Club career ==
Born on 25 December 1902 in Les Eaux-Vives, Geneva, Gallay began his football career in the early 1920s, at his hometown clubs FC Genève and Servette, with whom he played until 1923, when he was signed by Lyon OU, and later by Sète, where he quickly stood out from the rest, so he was then signed by Olympique de Marseille in 1925, aged 23.

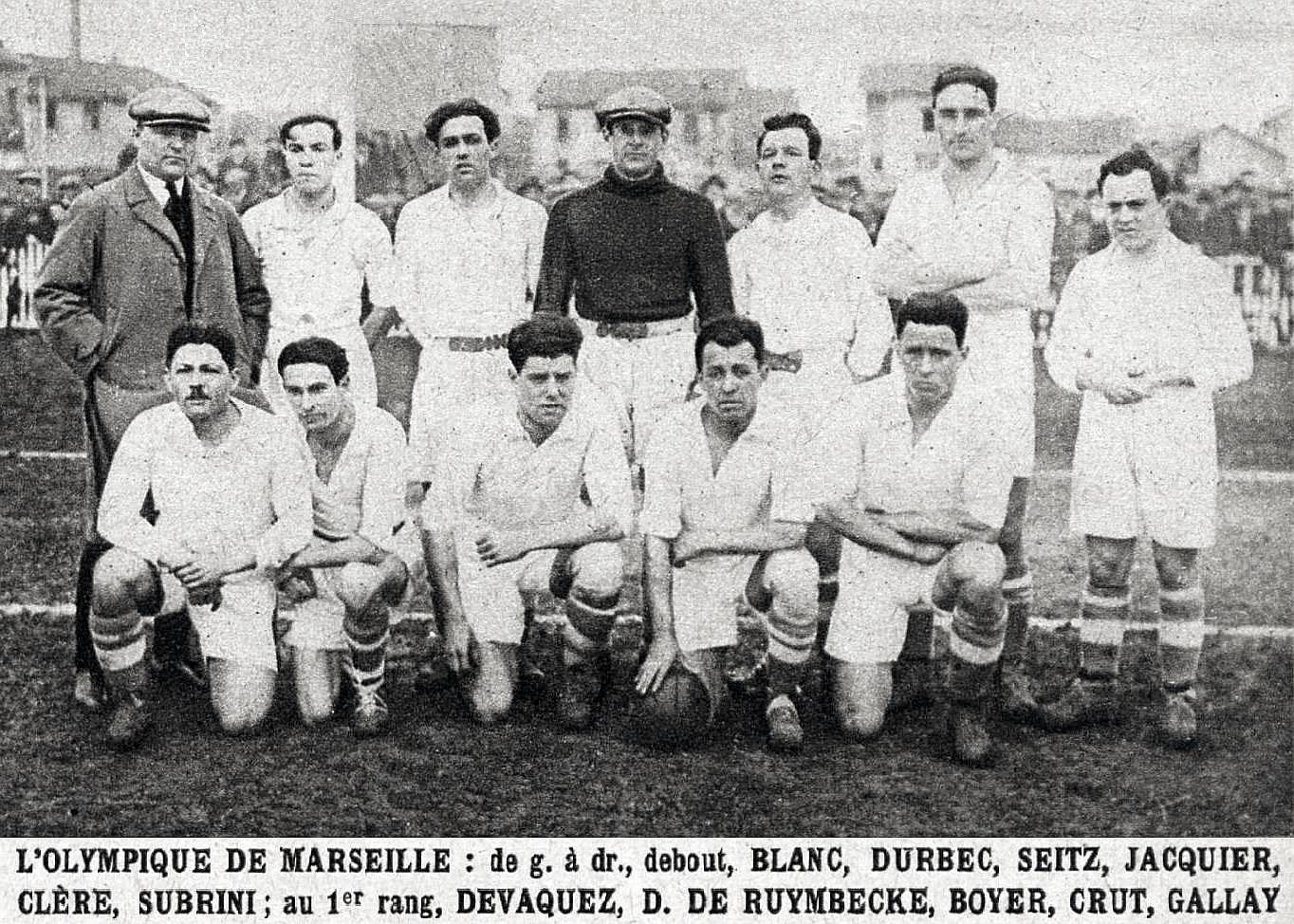
Gallay (crouching, first from right) with the Olympique de Marseille team in March 1926.

Together with Ernest Clère, Jean Boyer, and Jules Dewaquez, Gallay was a member of the OM team coached by Victor Gibson that won back-to-back Coupe de France titles in 1926 and 1927. He started in both finals, beating Valentigney 4–1 in the former and scoring a goal in the latter to help his side to a 3–0 win over Quevilly. In the semifinals of the 1926 edition, Gallay helped OM keep a clean-sheet in a 5–0 victory over Stade Français, with the local press praising his "easy pace, bold dribbling attempts, and athletic build".

Gallay also helped OM win the 1929 French Amateur Championship, beating Club Français 3–2 in the final on 28 April, partly thanks to his "formidable and successful work", providing a lot of good passes and support to the attacking line. He remained loyal to OM for nine years, from 1925 to 1934, scoring 4 goals in 111 official matches. After leaving OM, Gallay played four seasons at Crédit Lyonnais Marseille, where he retired in 1938, at the age of 36.

== International career ==
On 11 April 1926, the 23-year-old Gallay made his international debut for France in a friendly against Belgium in Paris, helping his side to a 4–3 victory. He scored his first (and only) goal for France in his third international appearance on 13 June 1926, a friendly against Yugoslavia, in which he also assisted to help his side to a 4–1 win; the following day, the journalists of the French newspaper L'Auto (the forerunner of L'Équipe) stated that he was "the best French left winger". He went on to earn a further 10 caps until 1929 for a total of 13.

== Death ==
Gallay died in Marseille on 15 August 1982, at the age of 79.

== Honours ==
Olympique de Marseille

- Coupe de France:
  - Champions (2): 1926 and 1927
- French Amateur Championship
  - Champions (1): 1929
- Ligue 1:
  - Runner-up (1): 1932–33
