= Aimé Durbec =

French footballer

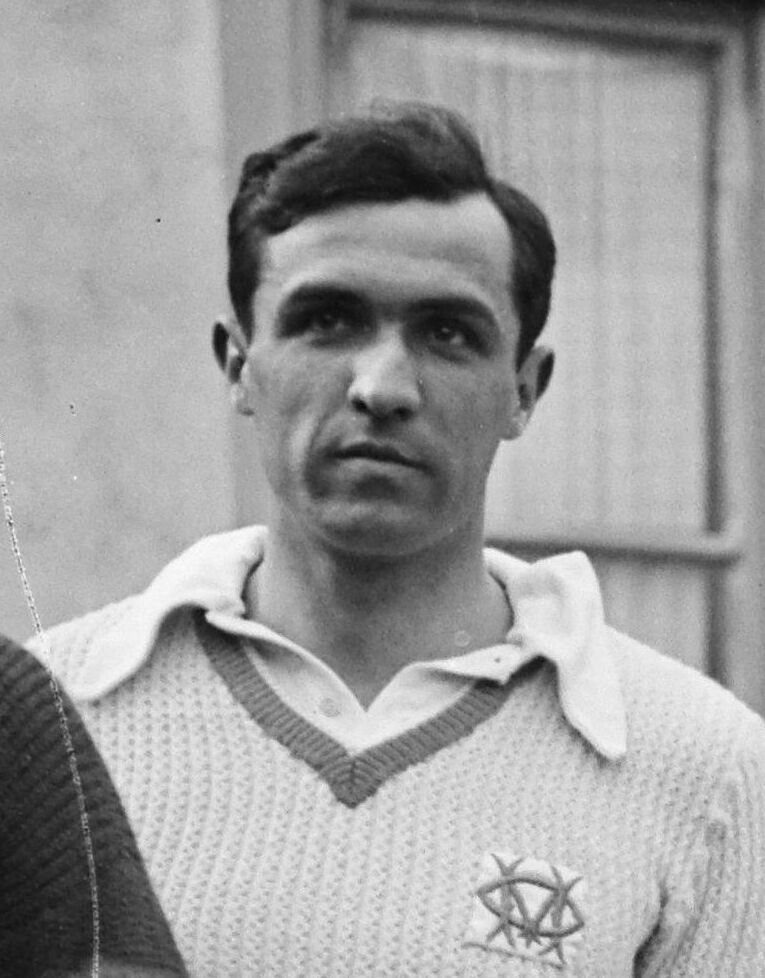
- Durbec in 1930

Personal information
- Full name: Aimé Marius Ernest Durbec
- Date of birth: 13 September 1902
- Place of birth: Ollioules, Var, France
- Date of death: 23 December 1991 (aged 89)
- Place of death: Garches, France
- Position: Defender

Senior career*
Years	Team	Apps	(Gls)
1922–1924	Sporting Victor Hugo		
1924–1931	Olympique de Marseille		
1931–1933	RC de France		
1933–1934	Club Français		

International career
1927	France	1	(0)
- * Club domestic league appearances and goals

Aimé Marius Ernest Durbec (13 September 1902 – 23 December 1991) was a French footballer who played as a defender for Olympique de Marseille and the French national team in the 1920s.

== Playing career ==
=== Club career ===
Born in Ollioules on 13 September 1902, Durbec began his football career in 1922, aged 20, with Sporting Victor Hugo, where he quickly stood out from the rest, so he was signed by Olympique de Marseille in 1924.

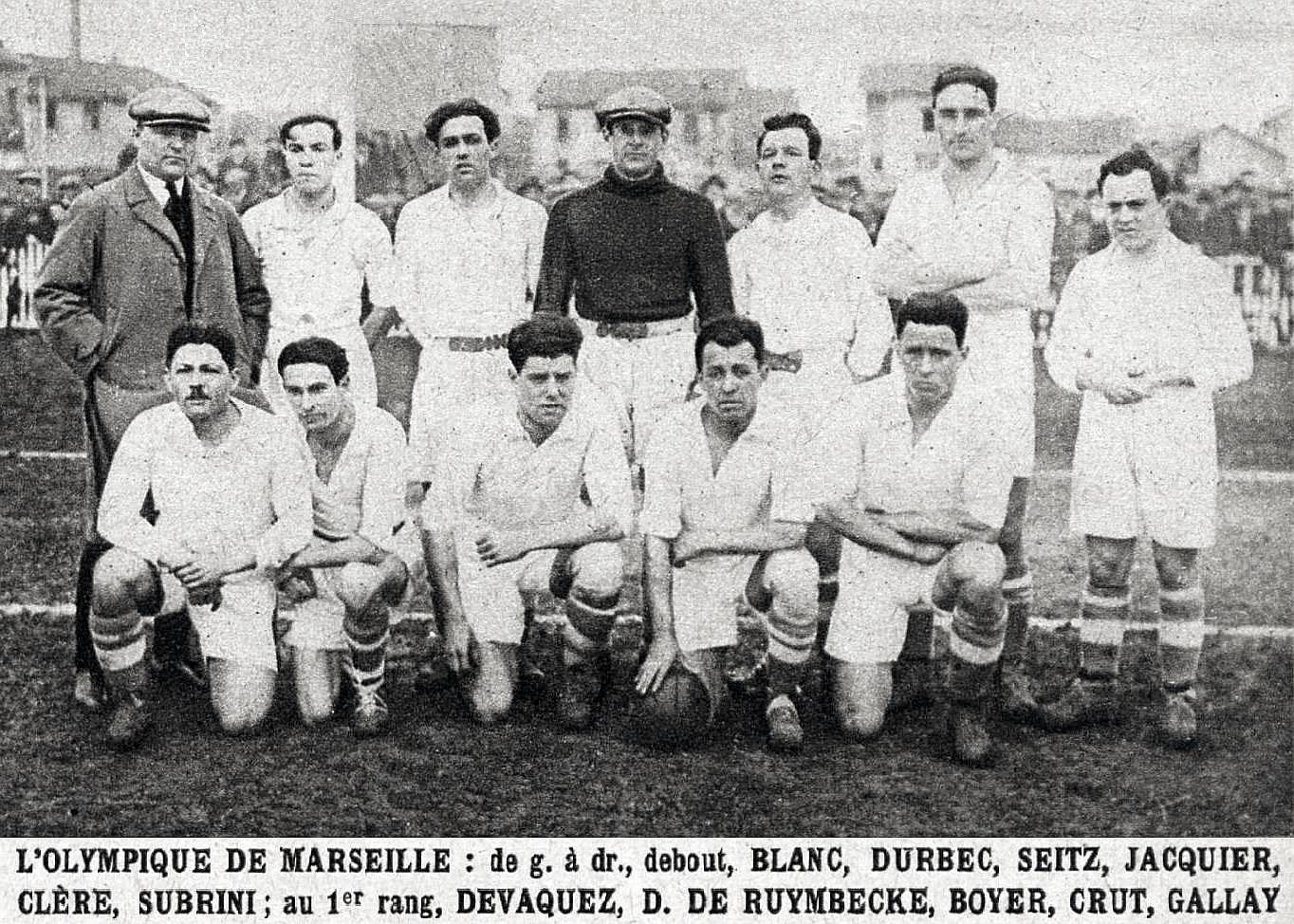
Durbec (standing, third from left) with the Olympique de Marseille team in March 1926.

Together with Ernest Clère, Jean Boyer, and Jules Dewaquez, Durbec was a member of the OM team coached by Victor Gibson that won back-to-back Coupe de France titles in 1926 and 1927, starting in both finals, beating Valentigney 4–1 in the former and Quevilly 3–0 in the latter. In the semifinals of the 1926 edition, he helped OM keep a clean-sheet in a 5–0 victory over Stade Français, with the local press stating that "Durbec proved to be outstanding attack breakers".

Durbec also helped OM win the 1929 French Amateur Championship, beating Club Français 3–2 in the final on 28 April, partly thanks to the decisive interventions of Durbec, who practiced a rapid and authoritarian method. He remained loyal to OM for seven years, from 1924 to 1931, scoring 4 goals in 111 official matches.

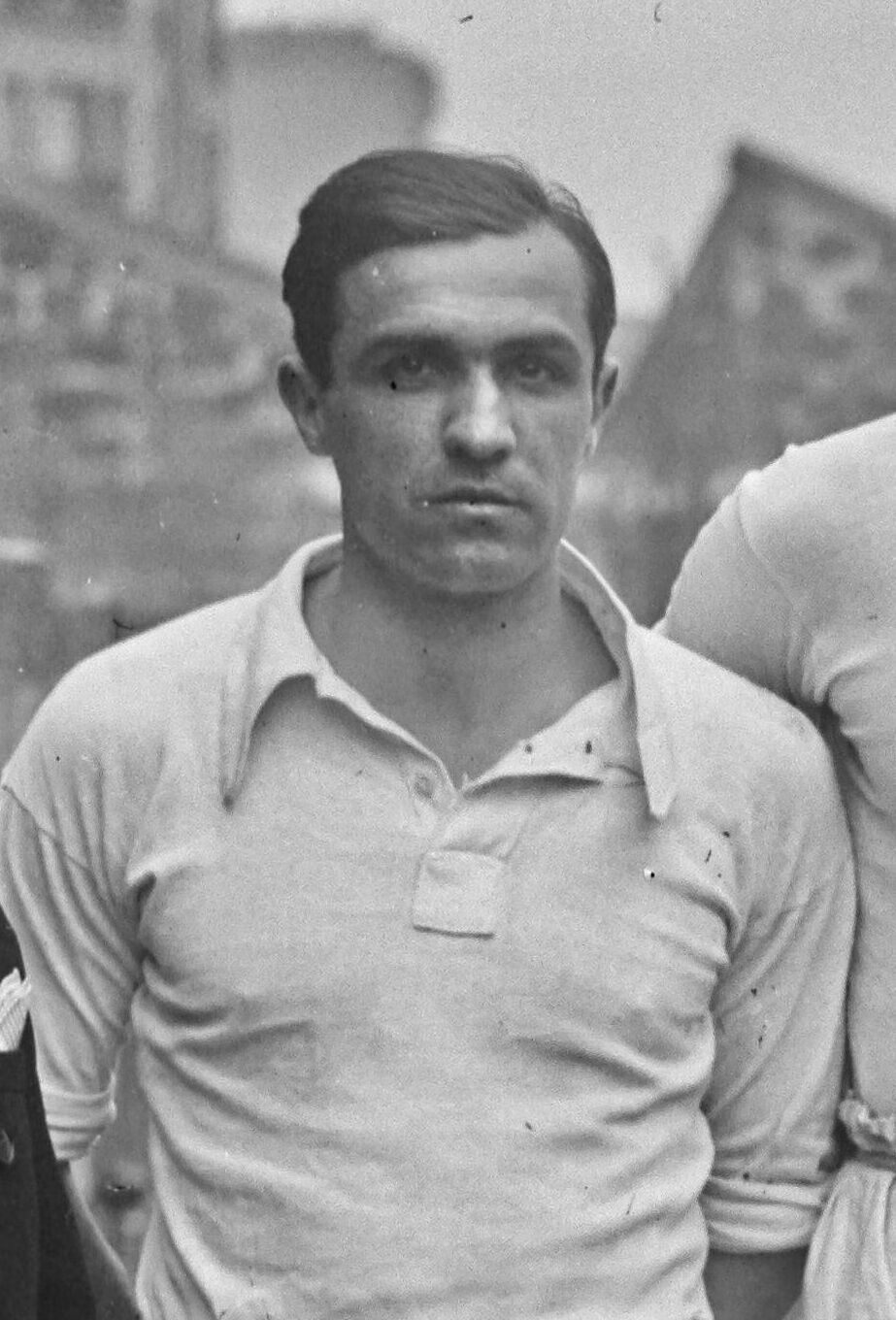
Durbec in 1931.

After leaving OM, Durbec played two seasons at both RC de France (1931–33) and Club Français (1933–35), where he retired in 1935, at the age of 33.

=== International career ===
On 12 June 1927, three months after his second Cuv victory, the 24-year-old Durbec earned his first (and only) international cap in a friendly match against Hungary in Budapest.

== Death ==
Durbec died in Garches on 23 December 1991, at the age of 89.

== Honours ==
Olympique de Marseille

- Coupe de France:
  - Champions (2): 1926 and 1927
- French Amateur Championship
  - Champions (1): 1929
