= Raoul Blanc =

French footballer (1905–1985)

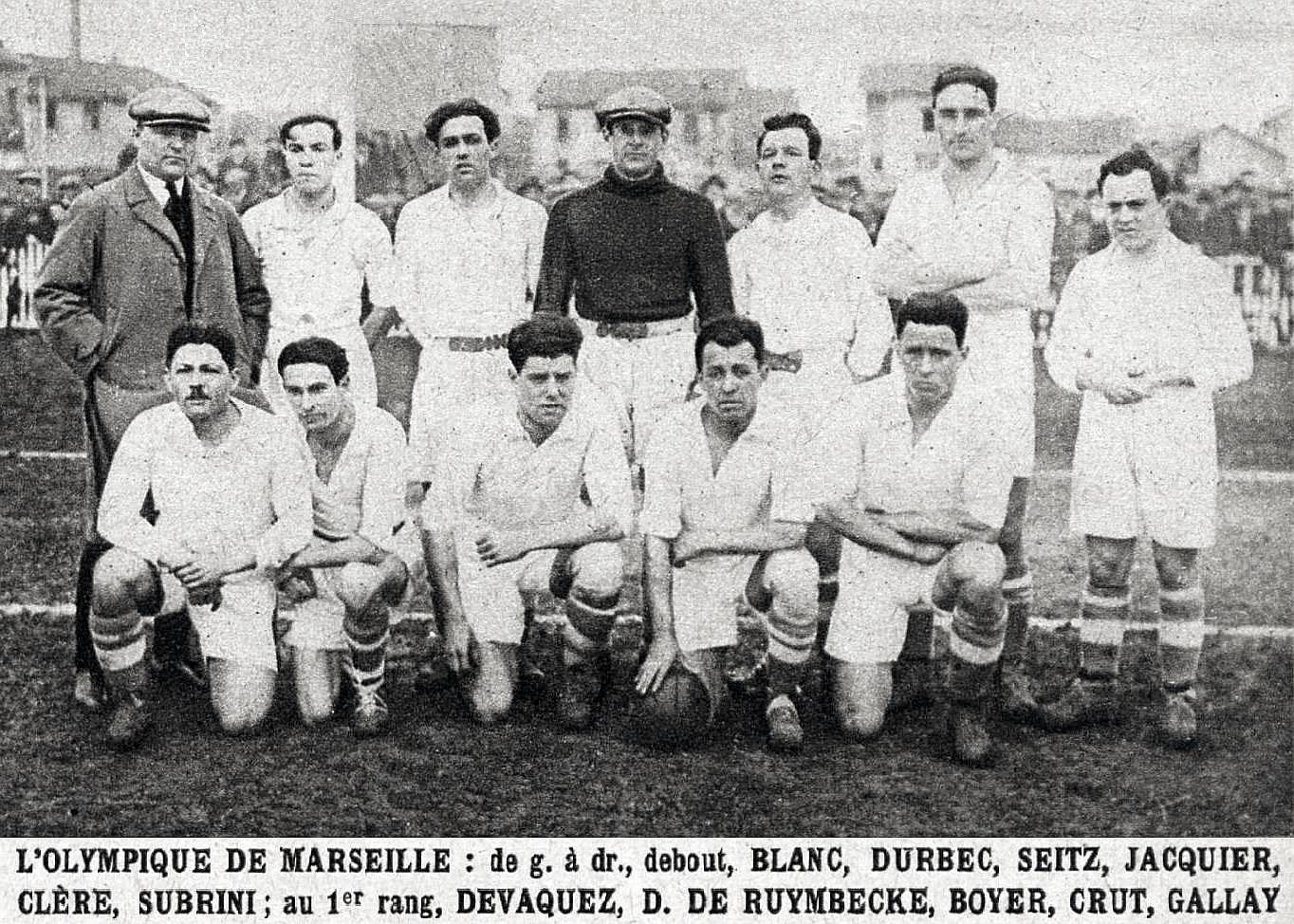
- Blanc (standing, first from left) with the Olympique de Marseille team in March 1926

Personal information
- Full name: Raoul Joseph Henri Blanc
- Date of birth: 28 August 1905
- Place of birth: Marseille, France
- Date of death: 2 July 1985 (aged 79)
- Place of death: Cornillon-Confoux, France
- Height: 1.79 m (5 ft 10 in)
- Position: Midfielder

Senior career*
Years	Team	Apps	(Gls)
1922–1933	Olympique de Marseille	78	(0)
1933–1935	Olympique de Marseille (reserves)	9	(1)
- * Club domestic league appearances and goals

Raoul Joseph Henri Blanc (28 August 1905 – 2 July 1985) was a French footballer who played as a midfielder for Olympique de Marseille between 1922 and 1933. A historical member of OM in the inter-war period, he spent his entire career there, thus being part of the so-called one-club men group.

== Career ==
Born in Marseille on 28 August 1905, Blanc began his football career in 1922, aged 17, with his hometown club Olympique de Marseille. Together with Ernest Clère, Jean Boyer, and Jules Dewaquez, Blanc was a member of the OM team coached by Victor Gibson that won two Coupe de France titles in 1924 and 1926, starting in both finals, beating Sète 3–2 in the former and Valentigney 4–1 in the latter. The following day, the journalists of the French newspaper Le Miroir des sports stated that he was "sometimes reckless".

Blanc also helped OM win the 1929 French Amateur Championship, beating Club Français 3–2 in the final on 28 April. He stayed at OM for over a decade, from 1922 to 1933, playing a total of 78 official matches.

== Death ==
Blanc died in Cornillon-Confoux on 2 July 1985, at the age of 79.

== Honours ==
Olympique de Marseille

- Coupe de France:
  - Champions (2): 1924 and 1926
- French Amateur Championship
  - Champions (1): 1929
