= 1924 Coupe de France final =

- Event: 1923–24 Coupe de France
Marseille	Sète
3	2
- After extra time
- Date: 14 April 1924
- Venue: Stade Pershing, Paris
- Referee: Louis Fourgous
- Attendance: 29,000

The 1924 Coupe de France final was a football match held at Stade Pershing, Paris on April 13, 1924, that saw Olympique de Marseille defeat FC Sète 3–2 thanks to goals by Edouard Crut (2) and Jean Boyer.

== Match details ==
14 April 1924

Marseille	3–2 (a.e.t.)	Sète
Crut 3', 101'; Boyer 42'		Cazal 15'; Torta 67' (o.g.)

Stade Pershing, Paris
Attendance: 29,000
Referee: Louis Fourgous

GK	(Belgium) Robert De Ruymbecke
DF	(France) Jean Jacquier
DF	(France) Paul Seitz
DF	(France) Raoul Blanc
DF	(France) Jean Cabassu
MF	(France) Apollon Torta
MF	(France) Adolphe Michel
FW	(France) Jean Boyer (c)
FW	(France) Louis Subrini
FW	(France) Edouard Crut
FW	(Belgium) Douglas De Ruymbecke
Manager:
(Scotland) Peter Farmer Assistant Referees: Fourth Official:

GK	(France) Laurent Henric
DF	(France) Ernest Gravier
DF	(France) William Hewitt
DF	(France) Antoine Parachini
DF	(France) Marcel Domergue (c)
MF	(France) Albert Jourda
MF	(England) Billy Cornelius
FW	(France) Louis Cazal "Pierrot"
FW	(France) Jean Caballero
FW	(France) Marcel Dangles
FW	(Scotland) Victor Gibson
Manager:
(Scotland) Victor Gibson

== See also ==
- 1923–24 Coupe de France
