= Raymond Durand (footballer) =

French footballer (1908–1989)

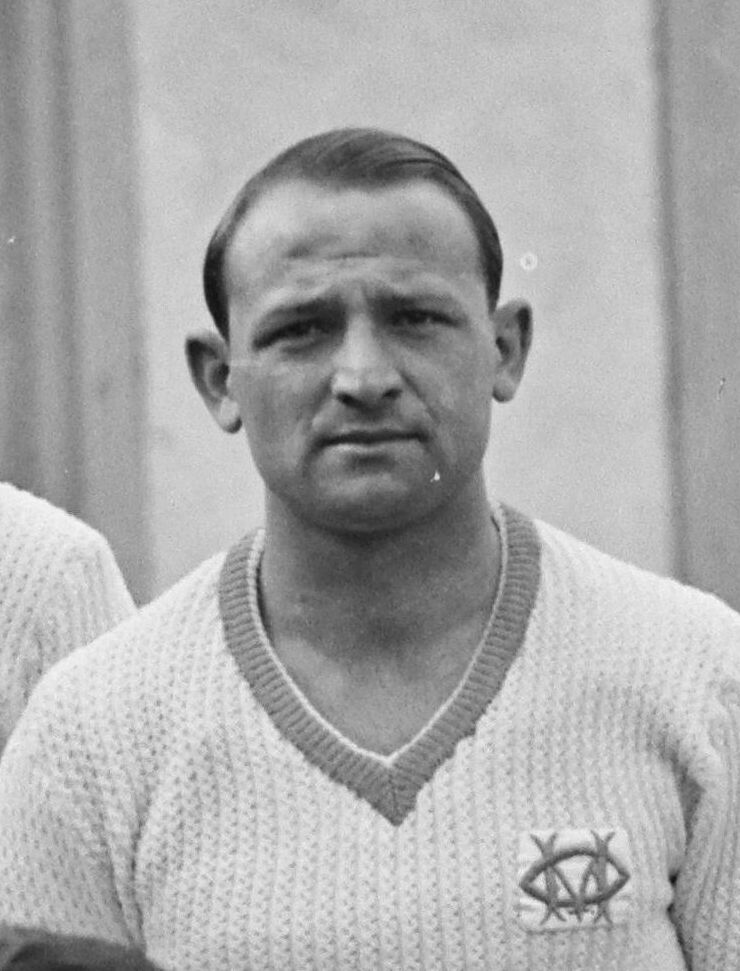
- Durand in 1930

Personal information
- Full name: Raymond Paul Jean Durand
- Date of birth: 29 January 1908
- Place of birth: Marseille, France
- Date of death: 31 October 1989 (aged 81)
- Place of death: Marseille, France
- Height: 1.76 m (5 ft 9 in)
- Position: Midfielder

Youth career
- 1918–1924: Olympique de Marseille

Senior career*
Years	Team	Apps	(Gls)
1924–1937	Olympique de Marseille		
1937–1939	AS Coder		
1939–1940	Olympique de Marseille		

International career
1931	France	1	(0)
- * Club domestic league appearances and goals

Raymond Paul Jean Durand (29 January 1908 – 31 October 1989) was a French footballer who played as a midfielder for Olympique de Marseille from 1924 until 1940. He also played one match for the French national team.

== Playing career ==
=== Club career ===
Born in Marseille on 29 January 1908, Durand began his football career in the youth ranks of his hometown club Olympique de Marseille, from which he joined the senior team in 1924, aged 16. Together with Ernest Clère, Jean Boyer, and Jules Dewaquez, he was a member of the OM team coached by Victor Gibson that won the Coupe de France titles in 1927, scoring the opening goal of the final with a shot from twenty meters to help his side to a 3–0 victory over Quevilly. The following day, the journalists of the French newspaper L'Auto (the future L'Équipe) described him as "Very active and fast, he proved to be an excellent shooter", and stated that "despite a nice goal, he cost his team six free kicks".

Except for a two-season stint at AS Coder (1937–39), Durand stayed at OM for over a decade, from 1924 until 1940, scoring a total of 51 goals in 178 official matches. In his latter years, he became a substitute, starting in the 1935 Coupe de France final only because wing-back Riahi Rabih pulled a muscle during the warm-up; OM claimed the trophy with a 3–0 victory over Rennes, and it was Durand who carried it in front of the club's crowd of fans. After the final, he gave his medal to Rabih, not only because he was the only one on the team to have already won the Cup, but also because of Rabih's despair, as he had already missed the 1934 final.

I'm 32 years old and we almost won. When I won my first Coupe de France, I was sixteen ... (Note: A reference to OM's title in 1924, to which he did not contribute on the field.) and I had hair! What a long time ago!

— Raymond Durand after the 1940 Coupe de France final.

In his last season at the club, Durand started in the 1940 Coupe de France final, which ended in a 2–1 loss to Racing de Paris. The following day, the journalists of L'Auto stated that he "held his post with merit".

=== International career ===
On 15 February 1931, the 23-year-old Durand earned his first (and only) international cap in a friendly match against Czechoslovakia at Colombes, which ended in a 1–2 loss.

== Death ==
Durand died in Marseille on 31 October 1989, at the age of 81, just two days after his former teammate Laurent Di Lorto; however, neither of them was honored with the typical minute's silence at OM's stadium. His son, Albert, also played for OM from 1955 to 1960.

== Honours ==
Olympique de Marseille

- Coupe de France:
  - Champions (2): 1927 and 1935
  - Runner-up (1): 1940
- French Amateur Championship
  - Champions (1): 1929
- Ligue 1:
  - Champions (1): 1936–37
