= Jean Cabassu =

French footballer (1902–1979)

Personal information
- Full name: Jean Valère Cabassu
- Date of birth: 2 August 1902
- Place of birth: Marseille, France
- Date of death: 29 November 1979 (aged 77)
- Place of death: Marseille, France
- Position: Defender

Senior career*
Years	Team	Apps	(Gls)
1917–1920	Olympique de Marseille		
1920–1921	FC Lyon		
1921–1924	Olympique de Marseille		
1924–1925	Stade Français		
1925–1931	Olympique de Marseille		

International career
1924	France	0	(0)
- * Club domestic league appearances and goals

Jean Valère Cabassu (2 August 1902 – 29 November 1979) was a French footballer who played as a defender for Olympique de Marseille in the 1920s.

== Playing career ==
=== Club career ===
Born in Marseille on 2 August 1902, Cabassu began his football career in 1917, aged 15, with his hometown club Olympique de Marseille. Together with Ernest Clère, Jean Boyer, and Jules Dewaquez, he was a member of the OM team coached by Victor Gibson that won two Coupe de France titles in 1924 and 1927, starting in both finals, beating Sète 3–2 in the former and Quevilly 3–0 in the latter. The following day, the journalists of the French newspaper L'Auto (the forerunner of L'Équipe) described his performance as "calm and clairvoyant, standing out from the other defenders by his excellent service and by his way of positioning himself, despite his lack of mobility".

Cabassu also helped OM win the 1929 French Amateur Championship, beating Club Français 3–2 in the final on 28 April, even though he had an "eclipse" of 15 minutes. Except for two one-season stints at FC Lyon (1920–21) and Stade Français (1924–25), he stayed at OM for over a decade, from 1917 until 1931, scoring a total of 12 goals in 104 official matches.

=== International career ===
On 23 March 1924, Cabassu was called up by the France national team for the first time, remaining an unused substitute in the friendly match against Switzerland in Geneva; France lost 3–0.

== Death ==
Cabassu died in Marseille on 29 November 1979, at the age of 77.

== Honours ==
Olympique de Marseille

- Coupe de France:
  - Champions (2): 1924 and 1927
- French Amateur Championship
  - Champions (1): 1929
