= Robert Accard =

French footballer (1897–1971)

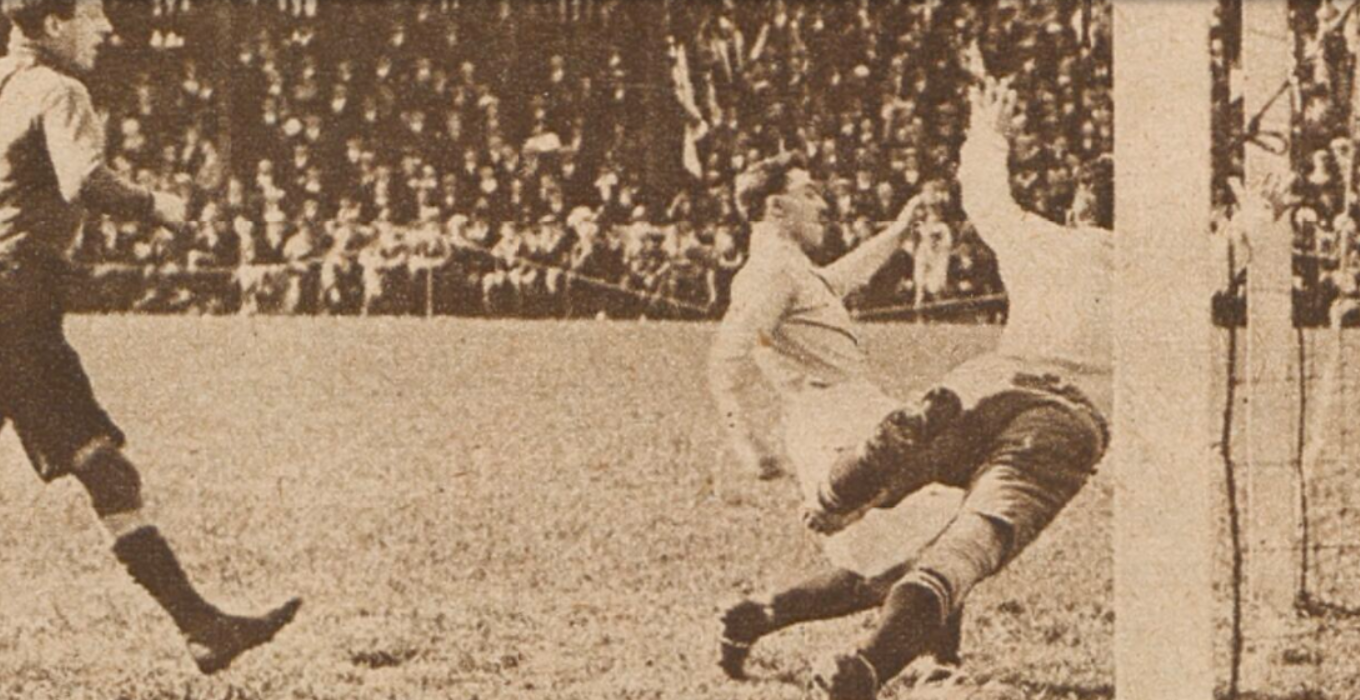
- Accard (middle) in 1926

Personal information
- Full name: Robert Auguste Accard
- Date of birth: 26 November 1897
- Place of birth: Lisieux, Calvados, France
- Date of death: 15 October 1971 (aged 73)
- Place of death: Le Havre France
- Position: Midfielder

Senior career*
Years	Team	Apps	(Gls)
1915–1925	Le Havre		
1925–1930	Stade havrais		

International career
1922–1926	France	6	(1)

Managerial career
- 1930s: Stade Français
- 1947–1949: AAJ Blois
- * Club domestic league appearances and goals

Robert Auguste Accard (26 November 1897 – 15 October 1971) was a French footballer who played as a midfielder for Le Havre and the French national team in the 1920s.

== Playing career ==
=== Club career ===
Born on 26 November 1897 in Lisieux, Calvados, Accard was a member of the Le Havre AC team that participated in the 1915–16 Coupe des Alliés, a knockout competition contested during the First World War, which given the mobilization of Frenchmen to the war, was mainly contested by U20 players, such as the 18-year-old Accard, who started in the semifinals against the eventual champions Stade Rennais.

Accard eventually established himself as a solid midfielder and an undisputed starter in the team, playing a crucial role in helping Le Havre win the 1919 USFSA Football Championship, beating Olympique de Marseille 4–1 in the final in May 1919. Together with Henri Gibbon, Bernard Lenoble, and Alfred Thorel, he helped Le Havre reach the 1920 Coupe de France final, which ended in a 2–1 loss to CA Paris. He remained loyal to Le Havre for a full decade, from 1915 until 1925, when he left for Stade havrais, with whom he won the Coupe Normandy in 1930, and where he played for five years, until 1930, when he retired at the age of 33.

=== International career ===
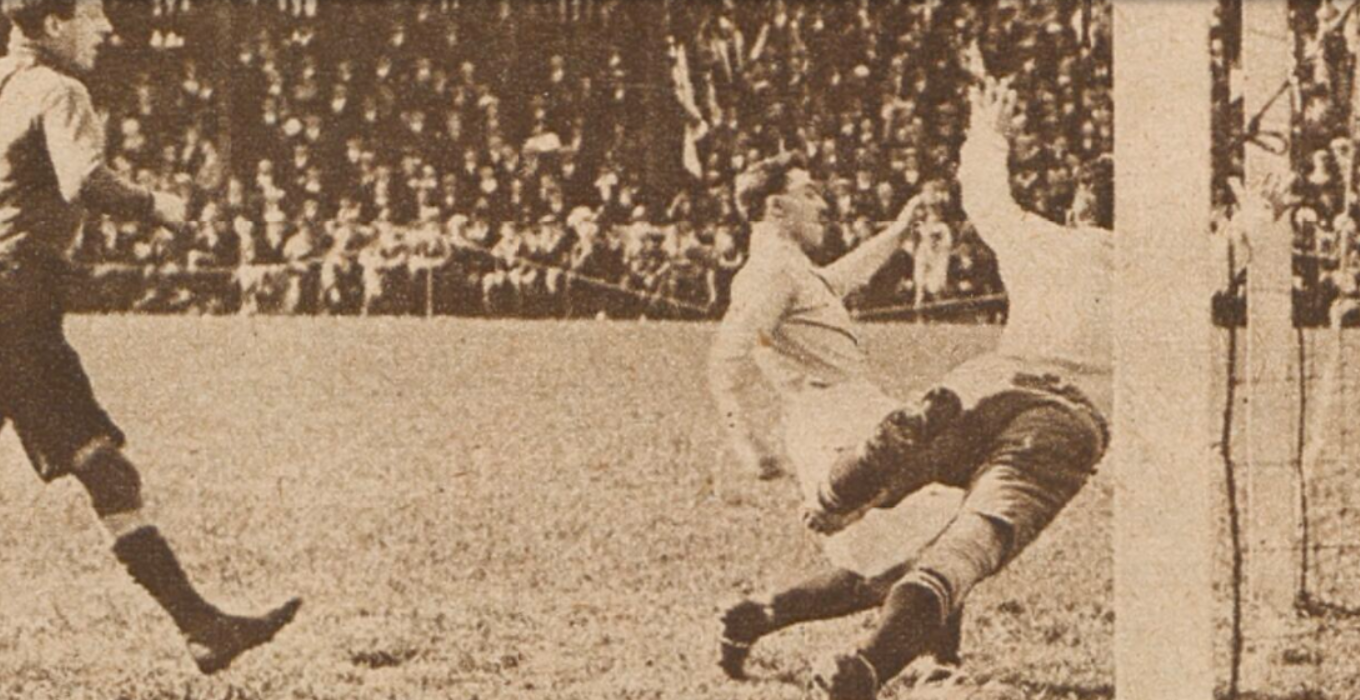
Accard scoring against Belgium on 20 June 1926.

On 15 January 1922, the 24-year-old Accard made his debut for France in a friendly match against Belgium at Colombes, helping his side to a 2–1 victory. He had to wait two years until his next international cap on 13 January 1924, when he came off the bench as a first-half substitute for Jean Boyer in another friendly home victory over Belgium.

In total, he played six matches for France between 1922 and 1926, making his last appearance in yet another friendly against Belgium, but this time it was away and ended in a 2–2 draw, even though he had scored the opening goal in the 3rd minute after a cross from Jules Dewaquez hit the bar and fell kindly to him, who "pushed it easily into the goal".

== Managerial career ==
At some point in the early 1930s, Accard became the coach of Stade Français, where he invented the defensive tactic of béton ("concrete") which would serve as a model for the Italian "catenaccio" and then the "Swiss lock", also known as the "Rappan lock", named after the Austrian Karl Rappan, who implemented this system at Servette in 1932.

== Death ==
Accard died in Le Havre on 15 October 1971, at the age of 73.

== Honours ==
Le Havre AC

- USFSA Football Championship:
  - Champions (1): 1919
- Coupe de France:
  - Runner-up (1): 1920

Stade havrais

- Coupe Normandy
  - Champions (1): 1930
