= Bobby De Ruymbeke =

Belgian footballer (1899–1963)

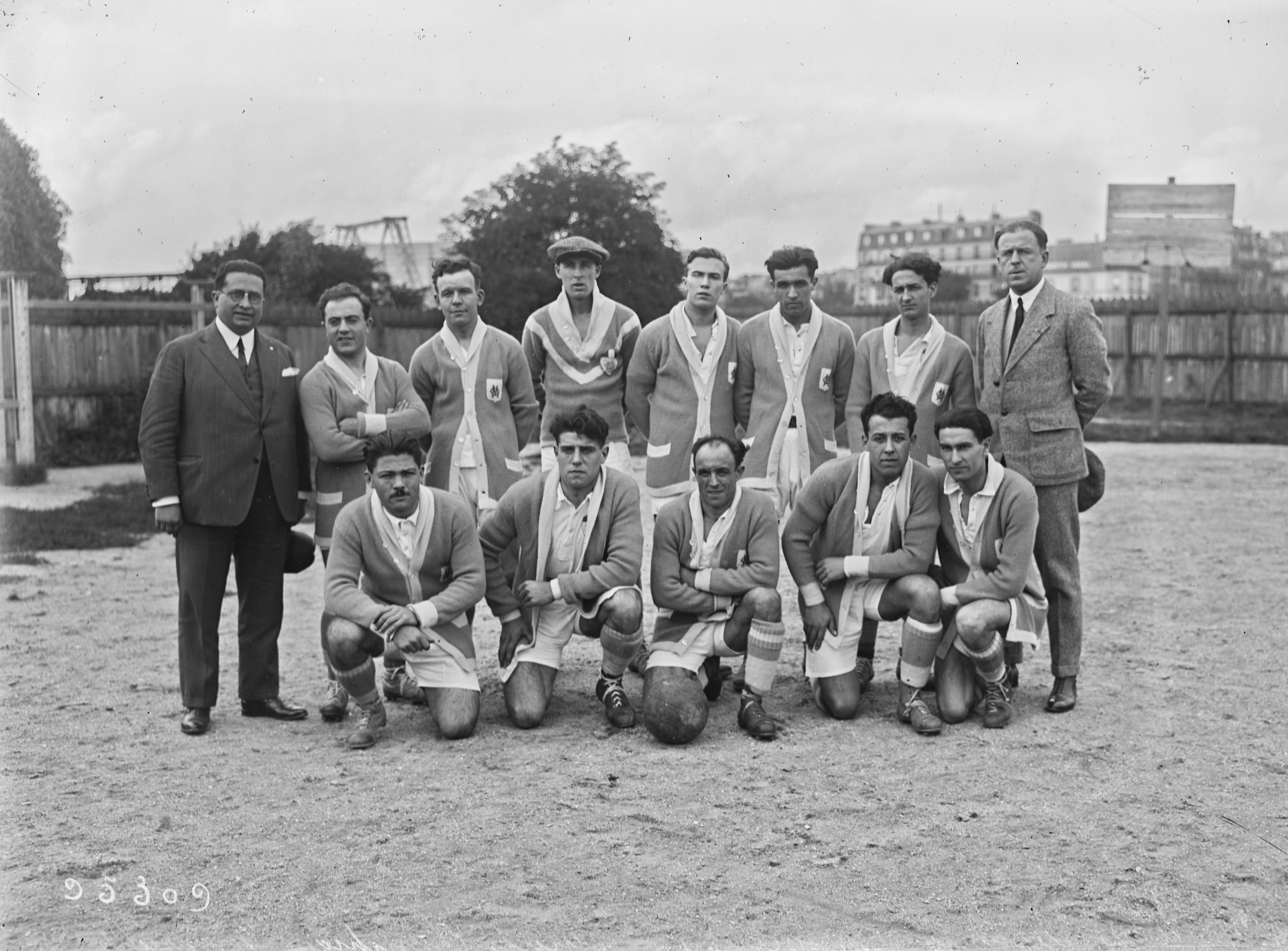
- De Ruymbeke with the Olympique de Marseille team in 1924

Personal information
- Full name: Athanase Marie Gaston Joseph van Ruymbeke
- Date of birth: 18 January 1898
- Place of birth: Brussels, Belgium
- Date of death: 2 May 1963 (aged 65)
- Place of death: Watermael-Boitsfort, France
- Position: Goalkeeper

Senior career*
Years	Team	Apps	(Gls)
1912–1920	Stade Leuven		
1920–1924	Olympique de Marseille	9	(1)
- * Club domestic league appearances and goals

Athanase Marie Gaston Joseph van Ruymbeke, better known as Bobby De Ruymbeke (18 January 1898 – 2 May 1963), was a Belgian footballer who played as a goalkeeper for Olympique de Marseille in the 1920s.

== Early and personal life ==
Athanase van Ruymbeke was born in Jette on 18 January 1898, as the son of Joseph van Ruymbeke (1858–1938) and Maud Taylor-Hargreave (1864–1928). He married Georgette Melchior (1902–1990), and the couple had at least one son, André van Ruymbeke (1921–2012).

== Playing career ==
In 1919, the 21-year-old Ruymbeke joined the ranks of Olympique de Marseille, where he played alongside his three brothers, who all played in different positions. Together with Ernest Clère, Jean Boyer, Jules Dewaquez, and his brother Douglas, he was a member of the OM team coached by Victor Gibson that won the Coupe de France in 1924, beating Sète 3–2 in the final. A few days later, the journalists of the French newspaper Le Miroir des sports described him as having "a theatrical, bold, reckless style, and an uncertain technique", but noted that "his impetuosity served him well and allowed him to redeem his defective technique with timely and unanswerable interventions".

He stayed at OM until 1927, playing a total of 32 official matches. He went on to create the club's veteran section, originally named Vieux Crampons ("Old Crampons").

== Death ==
De Ruymbeke died in Watermael-Boitsfort on 2 May 1963, at the age of 65. He was also the grandfather of the judge Renaud Van Ruymbeke.
