= 1927 Coupe de France final =

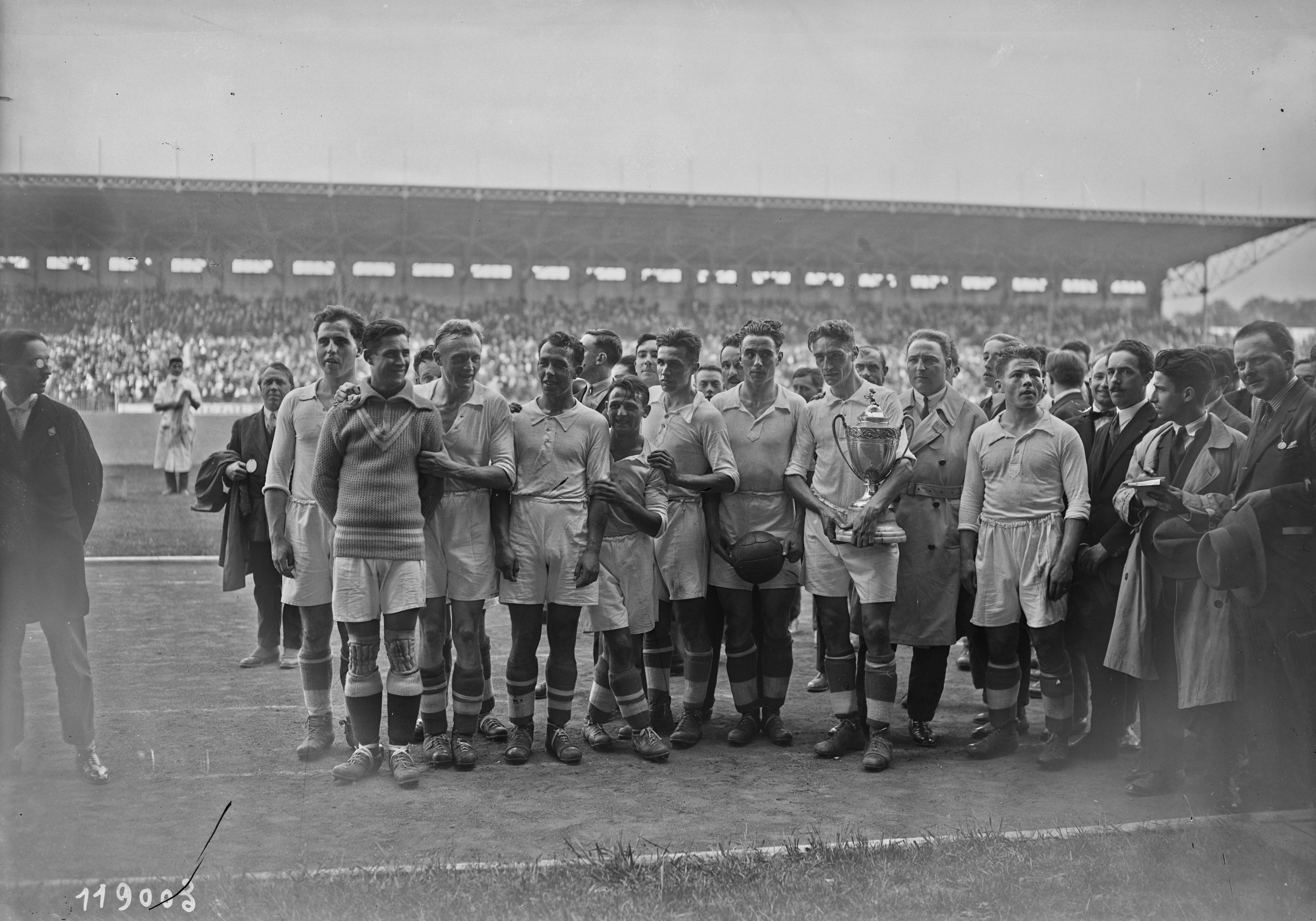
- Marseille players with the Trophy
- Event: 1926–27 Coupe de France
Marseille	Quevilly
3	0
- Date: 6 May 1927
- Venue: Stade Olympique, Colombes
- Referee: Paul Quittemel
- Attendance: 23,800

The 1927 Coupe de France final was a football match held at Stade Olympique, Colombes on May 6, 1927, that saw Olympique de Marseille defeat US Quevilly 3–0 thanks to goals by Raymond Durand, Maurice Gallay and Jules Dewaquez.

== Match details ==
6 May 1927

Marseille	3–0	Quevilly
Durand 34'; Galley 36'; Dewaquez 89'

Stade Olympique, Colombes
Attendance: 23,800
Referee: Paul Quittemel

GK	(France) Charles Allé
DF	(Weimar Republic) Paul Schnoeck
DF	(France) Jean Jacquier
DF	(France) Ernest Clere (c)
DF	(France) Jean Cabassu
MF	(France) André Durbec
MF	(France) Jules Dewaquez
FW	(France) Raymond Durand
FW	(France) Jean Boyer
FW	(France) Edouard Crut
FW	(France) Maurice Gallay
Manager:
(England) Victor Gibson Assistant Referees: Fourth Official:

GK	(England) Walter Puddefoot
DF	(France) Charles Demeilliez
DF	(France) Guillaume Farret
DF	(France) Robert Hecquel
DF	(France) Philippe Bonnardel (c)
MF	(France) Groult
MF	(France) Lucien Verdin
FW	(France) René Willig
FW	(France) Lucien Fagris
FW	(France) Guillard
FW	Norman Deans
Manager:
?

== See also ==
- 1926–27 Coupe de France
