= Douglas De Ruymbeke =

Belgian footballer (1894–1977)

Douglas De Ruymbecke
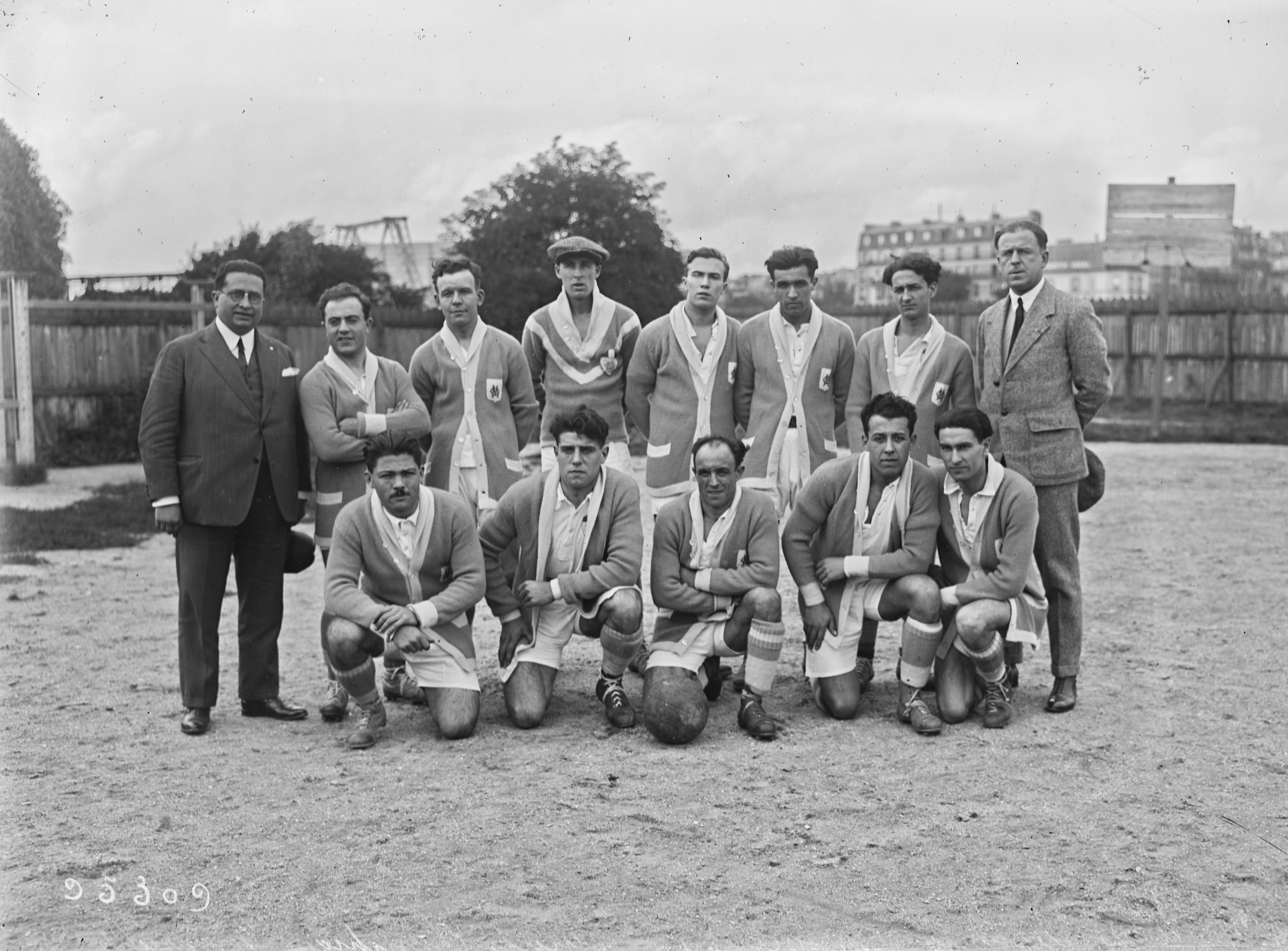
- De Ruymbeke with the Olympique de Marseille team in 1924

Personal information
- Full name: Eugène Douglas van Ruymbeke
- Date of birth: 25 August 1894
- Place of birth: Aurora, Illinois, United States
- Date of death: 7 October 1977 (aged 83)
- Place of death: Lausanne, France
- Position: Forward

Senior career*
Years	Team	Apps	(Gls)
1911–1913	RAEC Mons		
1913–1921	Stade Leuven		
1921–1927	Olympique de Marseille	9	
- * Club domestic league appearances and goals

Eugène Douglas van Ruymbeke (25 August 1894 – 7 October 1977) was a Belgian footballer who played as a forward for Olympique de Marseille in the 1920s.

== Early and personal life ==
Douglas van Ruymbeke was born on 25 August 1894 in Aurora, Illinois, as the son of Joseph van Ruymbeke (1858–1938) and Maud Taylor-Hargreave (1864–1928). On 6 December 1928, he married Yvonne Amelie Ramel (1889–?), and the couple had at least one son, Vesale.

== Career ==
In 1912, the 18-year-old Ruymbeke joined the ranks of Olympique de Marseille, where he played alongside his three brothers, who all played in different positions. Together with Ernest Clère, Jean Boyer, Jules Dewaquez, and his brother Bobby, he was a member of the OM team coached by Victor Gibson that won two Coupe de France titles in 1924 and 1926, starting in both finals as his side defeated Sète 3–2 in the former and Valentigney 4–1 in the latter. A few days later, he was harshly criticized by the journalists of the French newspaper Le Miroir des sports, who stated that he "falls into the excess of a ball artist: Feeling that he was up against inferior rivals, he lost his way in his dribbling, so much so that the ball was stolen from him on the way, but even if he had not been caught, de Ruymbecke would not have known what use to make of it".

He stayed at OM for 15 years, from 1912 to 1927, scoring a total of 11 goals in 64 official matches.

== Death ==
Ruymbeke died in Lausanne on 7 October 1977, at the age of 83.

== Honours ==
Olympique de Marseille

- Coupe de France:
  - Champions (2): 1924 and 1926
