= 1923 Coupe de France final =

- Event: 1922–23 Coupe de France
Red Star	Sète
4	2
- Date: 6 May 1923
- Venue: Stade Pershing, Paris
- Referee: Gabriel Jandin
- Attendance: 20,000

The 1923 Coupe de France final was a football match held at Stade Pershing, Paris on May 6, 1923, that saw Red Star Olympique defeat FC Sète 4–2 thanks to goals by Marcel Naudin (2), Lucien Cordon and Robert Joyaut.

== Match details ==
6 May 1923

Red Star	4–2	Sète
Naudin 2', 7'; Cordon 11'; Joyaut 17'		Cornelius 16'; Kramer 27'

Stade Pershing, Paris
Attendance: 20,000
Referee: Gabriel Jandin

GK	(France) Pierre Chayriguès
DF	(France) Lucien Gamblin (c)
DF	(France) Maurice Meyer
DF	(France) Robert Joyaut
DF	(France) François Hugues
MF	(France) Philippe Bonnardel
MF	(France) Lucien Cordon
FW	(France) Juste Brouzes
FW	(France) Paul Nicolas
FW	(France) Marcel Naudin
FW	(France) Raymond Sentubéry
Manager:
? Assistant Referees: Fourth Official:

GK	(France) François Encontre
DF	(France) Léon Huot
DF	(France) Ernest Gravier
DF	(Sweden) Oskar Berntsson
DF	(France) Albert Jourda
MF	(France) René Dedieu
MF	(England) Billy Cornelius
FW	(Switzerland) Georges Kramer
FW	(England) Arthur Parkes
FW	(France) Marcel Dangles (c)
FW	(France) Pujol
Manager:
(England) Victor Gibson

== See also ==
- 1922–23 Coupe de France
