= Charles Demeillez =

French footballer and manager (1902–1986)

Personal information
- Full name: Abel Charles Demeillez
- Date of birth: 10 October 1902
- Place of birth: Saint-Pierre-de-Varengeville, France
- Date of death: 7 March 1986 (aged 83)
- Place of death: Bois-Guillaume, France
- Position: Defender

Senior career*
Years	Team	Apps	(Gls)
1922–1925	Rouen		
1925–1928	Quevilly		

Managerial career
- 1938–1942: Valenciennes
- 1943–1944: Lille-Flandres
- 1945–1946: Valenciennes
- 1946–1947: Roubaix-Tourcoing
- 1951–1953: Valenciennes
- * Club domestic league appearances and goals

Abel Charles Demeillez (10 October 1902 – 7 March 1986) was a French footballer who played as a defender for Quevilly in the late 1920s, but he is best known for his work as a manager, guiding Roubaix-Tourcoing to a Ligue 1 triumph in 1947.

== Playing career ==
Born in the Seine-Maritime town of Saint-Pierre-de-Varengeville on 10 October 1902, Demeillez played for Rouen between 1922 and 1925, helping his side win the Upper Normandy Championship in 1925.

Together with Walter Puddefoot, Lucien Fagris, and Philippe Bonnardel, he was a member of the Quevilly team that reached the 1927 Coupe de France final, which ended in a 3–0 loss to Olympique de Marseille. The following day, the journalists of the French newspaper L'Auto (the future L'Équipe) stated that he was "the best player on his team", describing him as wise and confident, avoiding many dangerous situations for his goal".

== Managerial career ==
In 1938, the 36-year-old Demeillez took over Valenciennes, who played their home matches Stade Nungesser, which he deemed too large, so its length was reduced by six metres. In 1946, he replaced Jean Batmale as the new coach Roubaix-Tourcoing, but despite guiding them to a Ligue 1 triumph in 1947, he did not stay at the club and was replaced at the end of the season by Georges Winckelmans.

In 1951, Demeillez took over Valenciennes for the third time, holding this position for two years, until 1953. In 1951, he gave a senior debut to the 17-year-old Bernard Chiarelli, who went on to help France achieve a third-place at the 1958 FIFA World Cup.

== Death ==
Demeillez died in Bois-Guillaume on 7 March 1986, at the age of 83.

== Honours ==
=== As a player ===
Quevilly

- Coupe de France:
  - Runner-up: 1927

=== As a manager ===
Valenciennes

- Ligue 1:
  - Champions: 1946–47

== See also ==
- List of Ligue 1 winning managers
