= 1926 Coupe de France final =

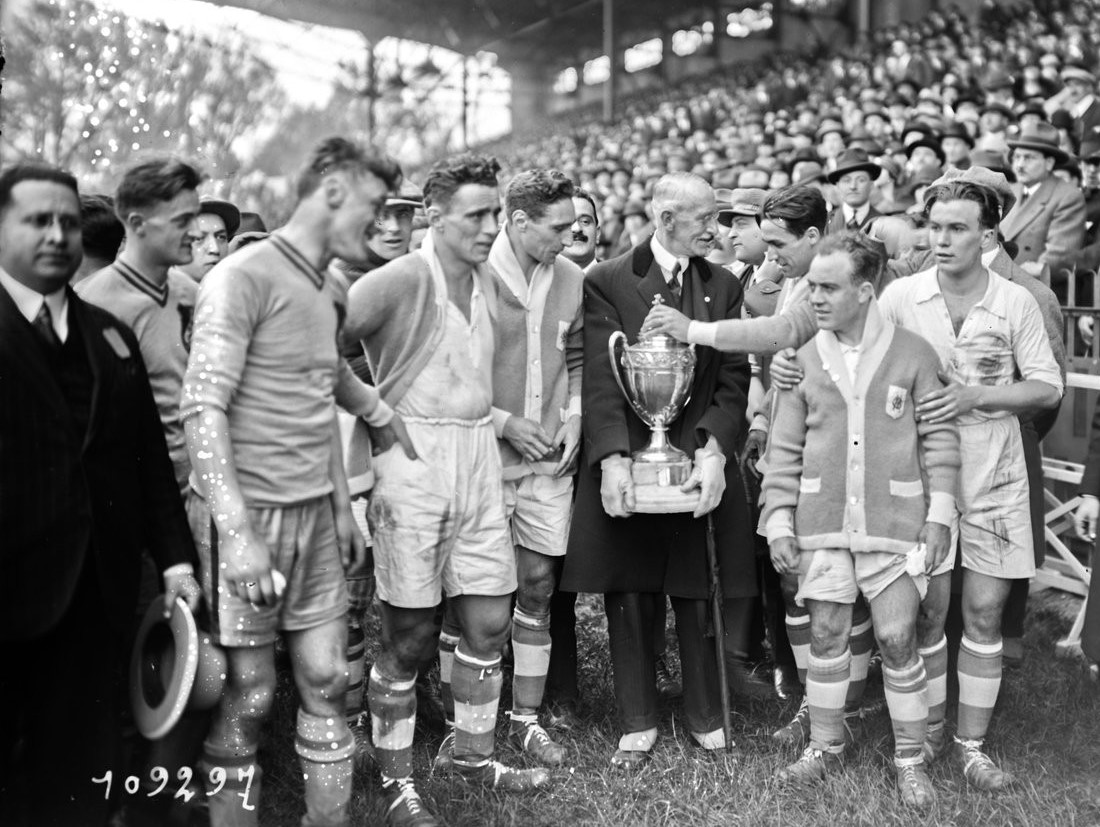
- Marseille receives the Cup
- Event: 1925–26 Coupe de France
Marseille	Valentigney
4	1
- Date: 9 May 1926
- Venue: Stade Olympique, Colombes
- Referee: Georges Balvay
- Attendance: 30,000

The 1926 Coupe de France final was a football match for the finalists in France's leading knockout tournament, held at Stade Olympique, Colombes on May 9, 1926, that saw Olympique de Marseille defeat AS Valentigney 4–1 thanks to goals by Jules Dewaquez (2), Douglas De Ruymbecke and Jean Boyer.

== Match details ==
9 May 1926

Marseille	4–1	Valentigney
Dewaquez 16', 80'; De Ruymbecke 26'; Boyer 33'		Chavey 40'

Stade Olympique, Colombes
Attendance: 30,000
Referee: Georges Balvay

GK	(France) Paul Seitz
DF	(France) André Durbec
DF	(France) Jean Jacquier
DF	(France) Louis Subrini
DF	(France) Ernest Clere
MF	(France) Raoul Blanc
MF	(France) Jules Dewaquez
FW	(Belgium) Douglas De Ruymbecke
FW	(France) Jean Boyer (c)
FW	(France) Edouard Crut
FW	(France) Maurice Gallay
Manager:
(England) Victor Gibson Assistant Referees: Fourth Official:

GK	(France) Henri Entz
DF	(France) Roger Lovy
DF	(France) Valéry Simonin
DF	(France) Henri Rigoulot
DF	(France) Georges Goll (c)
MF	(France) Raoul Richard
MF	(France) Etienne Grédy
FW	(France) Léon Van Praet
FW	(France) Edmond Chavey
FW	(France) Louis Haenni
FW	(France) Louis Schaff
Manager:
?

== See also ==
- 1925–26 Coupe de France
