= Ruymbeke =

Ruymbeke is a Belgian surname. Notable people with the surname include:

- Douglas De Ruymbeke (1894–1977), Belgian footballer, brother of Paul, Joseph, and Gaston
- Joseph De Ruymbeke (1900–1928), Belgian footballer, brother of Douglas, Paul, and Gaston
- Bobby De Ruymbeke (1898–1963), Belgian footballer, brother of Douglas, Joseph, and Gaston
  - André Van Ruymbeke (1921–2012), resistance fighter, senior civil servant, and French business leader
    - Renaud Van Ruymbeke (1952–2024), French magistrate
    - Bertrand Van Ruymbeke (born 1962), French historian
- Gaston de Ruymbeke (1903–1992), Belgian footballer, brother of Douglas, Bobby, and Joseph
