= Brassy =

Brassy may refer to:

- Brassy, Somme, a French municipality in the région of Picardy
- Brassy, Nièvre, a French municipality in the région of Burgundy
- Brassy (band), a British band

== See also ==
- Brass
