= Marcel Dangles =

French footballer (1899–1974)

Personal information
- Full name: Marcel Alphonse François Dangles
- Date of birth: 26 February 1899
- Place of birth: Sète, France
- Date of death: 15 February 1974 (aged 74)
- Place of death: Bages, France
- Position: Forward

Senior career*
| Years | Team | Apps | (Gls) |
| 1922–1931 | FC Sète | | |

International career
| 1923 | France | 1 | (0) |
- * Club domestic league appearances and goals

Marcel Alphonse François Dangles (26 February 1899 – 15 February 1974) was a French footballer who played as a forward for FC Sète and the France national team in the 1920s.

== Career ==
=== Club career ===
Born on 26 February 1899 in the Hérault town of Sète, Dangles began his football career at his hometown club FC Sète in 1922, aged 23.

Together with Ernest Gravier, Billy Cornelius, and Georges Kramer, he was a member of the Sète team that reached back-to-back Coupe de France finals in 1923 and 1924, which ended in losses to Red Star (4–2) and Olympique de Marseille (3–2), respectively. After the 1923 final, in which Sète conceded four goals within the first 20 minutes, he told the press that they "paid dearly for our adaptation to both the pitch and the opponent", adding that "we really had a few minutes of nervousness, and even weariness". He remained with Sète until 1931, when he retired at the age of 32.

=== International career ===
On 10 May 1923, just a few days after the 1923 Cup final, the 24-year-old Dangles earned his first (and only) international cap for France in a friendly match against England in Paris, which ended in a 1–4 loss. He played as a last-minute replacement to Paul Nicolas, registering at least one shot on target. At halftime, the French players changed from their usual blue jersey kits adorned with the rooster with another one that was also blue, but with a large buttonhole and white cuffs, which means that Dangles wore more jerseys than he earned caps.

== Death ==
Dangles died in Bages, Pyrénées-Orientales on 15 February 1974, at the age of 74.

== Honours ==
Sète

- Coupe de France:
  - Runner-up (2): 1922–23, and 1923–24
