= Arthur Parkes =

English footballer

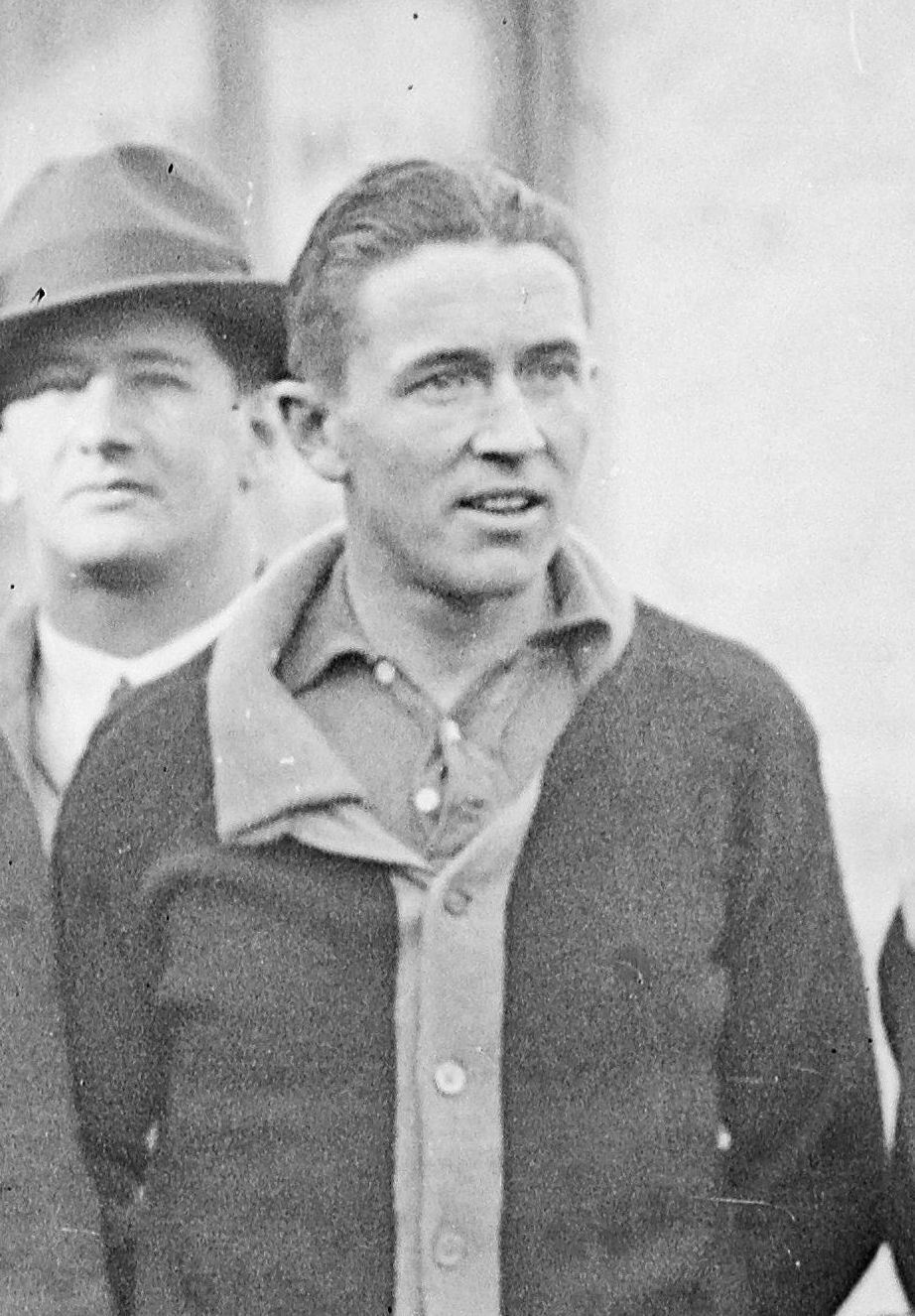
- Parkes in 1931

Personal information
- Place of birth: England
- Position: Midfielder

Senior career*
| Years | Team | Apps | (Gls) |
| 1922–1923 | Sète | | |
| 1931–1933 | Club Français | | |
- * Club domestic league appearances and goals

Arthur C. Parkes was an English professional footballer.

== Career ==
Parkes played for both FC Sète and Club Français in France. In 1922, he was brought over to the country along with fellow countryman Billy Cornelius by Victor Gibson. With Sète, he played in the 1923 Coupe de France Final where the club was defeated by Red Star Olympique. In 1931, Parkes joined Club Français and won the Coupe de France in his first season. In 1932, he played in France's first-ever professional league championship.
