= Robert Joyaut =

French footballer (1900–1966)

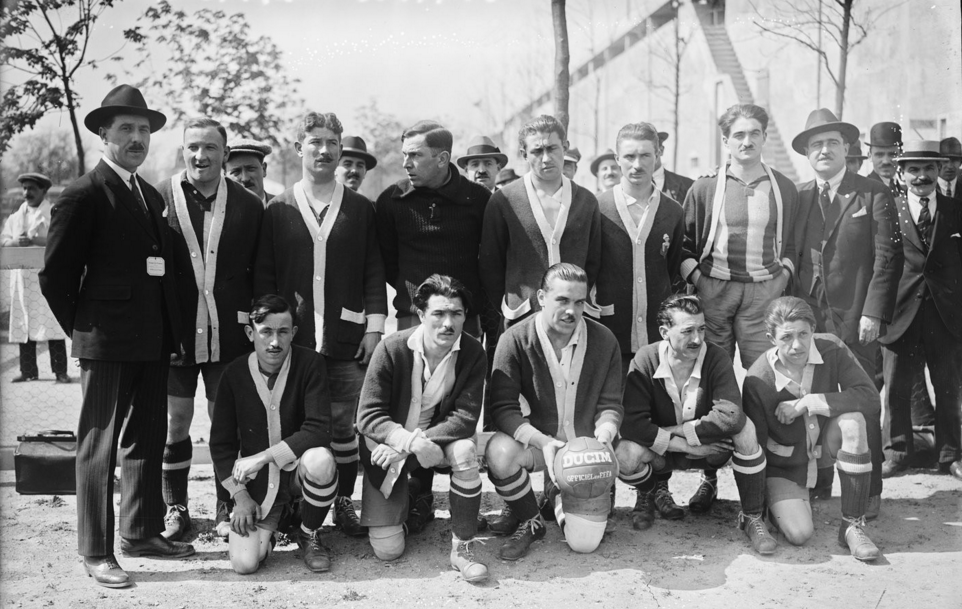
- Joyaut (standing, fourth from left) in 1920

Personal information
- Full name: Robert Désiré Victor Joyaut
- Date of birth: 5 December 1900
- Place of birth: 14th arrondissement of Paris, France
- Date of death: 12 September 1966 (aged 65)
- Place of death: La Louptière-Thénard, France
- Position: Midfielder

Senior career*
Years	Team	Apps	(Gls)
1919–1924	Red Star		

International career
1919–1924	France	4	(0)
- * Club domestic league appearances and goals

Robert Désiré Victor Joyaut (5 December 1900 – 12 September 1966) was a French footballer who played as a midfielder for Red Star and the France national team in the early 1920s.

== Career ==
=== Club career ===
Born in the 14th arrondissement of Paris on 5 December 1900, (Note: Some sources wrongly claim that he was born on 31 December 1899.) Joyaut began his football career in the youth ranks of his hometown club Red Star, signing his first license with the club in the junior category.

Together with Pierre Chayriguès, Lucien Gamblin, and Paul Nicolas, Joyaut was a member of the Red Star team that won back-to-back Coupe de France titles in 1922 and 1923, starting in both finals, as his side defeated Rennes (2–0) and Sète (4–2), respectively. In the latter final, he scored his side's fourth goal with a 40-meter shot to seal a 4–2 win. He stayed at Red Star until 1924, when he retired at the age of 24.

=== International career ===
On 28 January 1923, the 22-year-old Joyaut made his international debut for France in a friendly against Spain in Atotxa Stadium, which ended in a 3–0 loss. The following day, the journalists of the French newspaper L'Auto (the future L'Équipe) stated that he "had a very good debut, but he had to watch out for Acedo and Carmelo, two aces who often beat him". In total, he earned four international caps for France, all in 1923, and all in friendlies.

== Death ==
Joyaut died in La Louptière-Thénard on 12 September 1966, at the age of 65.

== Honours ==
Red Star

- Coupe de France:
  - Champions (2): 1921–22, and 1922–23
