= Peter Farmer (footballer) =

Scottish football manager (1886–1964)

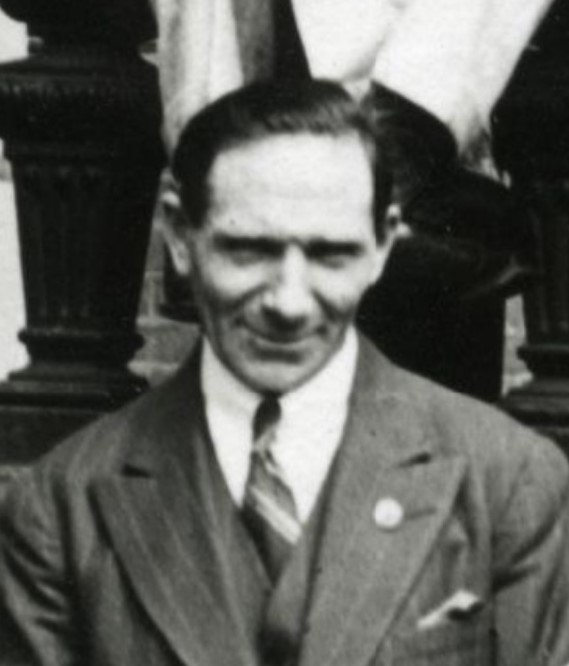
- Farmer in 1928

Personal information
- Date of birth: 26 October 1886
- Place of birth: Renton, Scotland
- Date of death: 4 September 1964 (aged 77)
- Place of death: Hammersmith, England

Senior career*
Years	Team	Apps	(Gls)
1904–1910	Vale of Leven		
1911–????	Celtic		

Managerial career
- 1923–1924: Marseille
- 1924–1926: Torino
- 1928: France Olympic
- 1930: Marseille
- 1933–1934: Racing Club de France
- 1934: Tunbridge Wells Rangers
- 1934–1935: Romania
- * Club domestic league appearances and goals

Peter Farmer (26 October 1886 – 4 September 1964) was a Scottish professional football manager active throughout Europe in the 1920s and 1930s.

== Early life ==
Farmer was born in Renton, Scotland to Irish-born parents. He started his career in 1904 at Vale of Leven then joined Celtic reserves in 1911.

== Coaching career ==
Farmer coached French teams Marseille (1923–1924) and Racing Club de France (1933–1934). He had a second spell at Marseille (1930–1931) and also coached Stella Cherbourg.

Farmer was also in charge of Italian side Torino between 1924 and 1926, and US Biellese. He later coached the France national team at the 1928 Summer Olympics. He was later a trainer at Celtic (1929–1930) and manager of Tunbridge Wells Rangers (1934).

In November 1934, he was appointed as Romania's national team coach but never led the team in any official match, leaving in May 1935.

== Honours ==
Marseille

- Coupe de France: 1923–24

Racing Club de France

- Coupe de France: 1927–28
