= Albert Jourda =

French footballer (1893-1961)

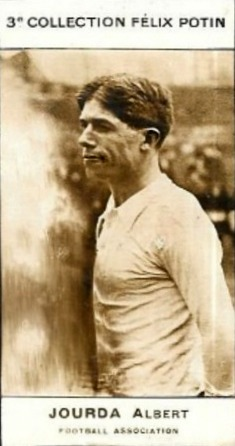
- Jourda in 1922

Personal information
- Date of birth: 14 January 1893
- Place of birth: Paris, France
- Date of death: 23 December 1961 (aged 68)
- Position: Midfielder

Senior career*
Years	Team	Apps	(Gls)
1913–1914	CA Vitry		
1914–1920	Club Français		
1920–1921	Racing Paris		
1921–1925	Sète		
1925–1926	Red Star Paris		

International career
1914–1924	France	7	(0)
- * Club domestic league appearances and goals

Albert Jourda (14 January 1893 – 23 December 1961) was a French international footballer who played as a midfielder.

== Career ==
Jourda was born in 1893 in Paris.

He played most of his career for Club Français and Sète. With Club Français, he played on the team that won the 1918 edition of the Challenge de la Renommée, a competition held during World War I. With Sète, he played in back-to-back Coupe de France finals. The club lost both matches; 4–2 to Red Star Olympique in 1923 and 3–2 against Marseille in 1924.

Jourda was also a France international, who played seven matches with the team. He was part of the French squad for the football tournament at the 1924 Summer Olympics, but he did not play in any matches.
