= Ligue de Bourgogne de football =

- Sport: Football
- Jurisdiction: Regional
- Abbreviation: LBF
- Founded: 1920
- Affiliation: FFF
- Closure date: 2016

The Ligue de Bourgogne de football was a federal body of the French Football Federation which was founded in 1920. It was responsible for organising all football competitions in Burgundy.

== History ==
It was created in 1920 as the Ligue de Bourgogne-Franche-Comté, however its name was adopted in 1947 after the creation of the Ligue de Franche-Comté. Despite its name, the league didn’t cover all regions of Burgundy, since it was only joined by clubs from the department of Nièvre (who were previously affiliated to the Ligue d'Auvergne) in 1967.

In 2016, the Ligue de Bourgogne and the Ligue de Franche-Comté remerged under its former name, the Ligue de Bourgogne-Franche-Comté, due to the creation of the Bourgogne-Franche-Comté region.

== League ==
The LBF, whose headquarters were at 2, Avenue de la République 71210 Montchanin, accounted for five districts based on the departments of the Côte-d'Or, Nièvre, Yonne and a subdivision of the department of Saône-et-Loire.

The main competition organised by the league was the Division d'Honneur de Bourgogne which entitled the winner to participate in the Championnat de France Amateur. The league also dealt with the early rounds of the Coupe de France and managed the regional women's football.
