= Léon Huot =

French footballer (1898–1961)

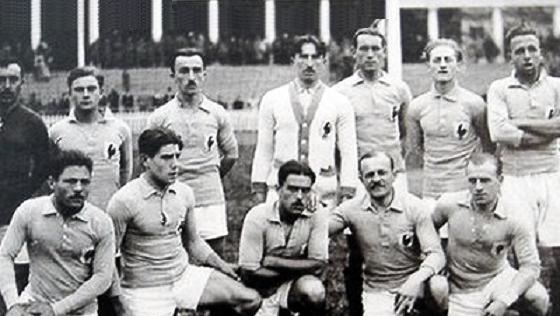
- Huot (standing on the left) with the French team at the 1920 Summer Olympics

Personal information
- Date of birth: 31 December 1898
- Place of birth: Villeneuve-Saint-Georges, France
- Date of death: 26 May 1961 (aged 62)
- Place of death: Gard, France

International career
Years	Team	Apps	(Gls)
- France

Léon Huot (31 December 1898 – 26 May 1961) was a French footballer. He competed in the men's tournament at the 1920 Summer Olympics.
