= Walter Puddefoot =

English footballer

Personal information
- Full name: Walter Puddefoot
- Place of birth: England
- Position: Goalkeeper

Senior career*
Years	Team	Apps	(Gls)
–	US Quevilly	?	(?)
- * Club domestic league appearances and goals

Walter Puddefoot was an English professional footballer who played as a goalkeeper for US Quevilly in the 1927 Coupe de France Final.
