= Lucien Cordon =

French footballer (1899–1978)

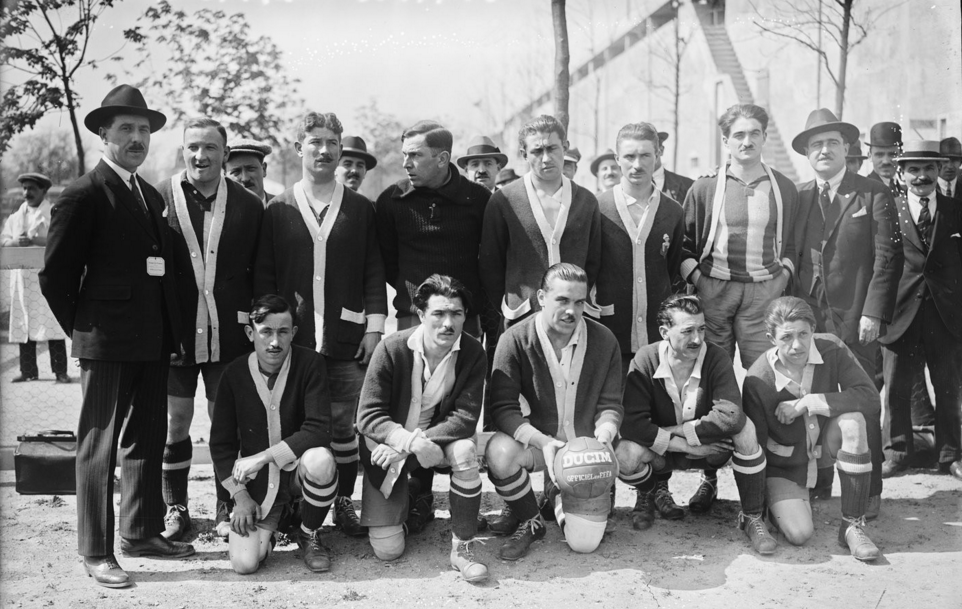
- Naudin (crouching, first from left) in 1920

Personal information
- Date of birth: 26 May 1899
- Place of birth: Saint-Ouen-sur-Seine, France
- Date of death: 17 September 1978 (aged 79)
- Place of death: 10th arrondissement of Paris, France
- Position: Forward

Senior career*
Years	Team	Apps	(Gls)
1919–1926	Red Star		

International career
1925	France	0	(0)
- * Club domestic league appearances and goals

Lucien Cordon (26 May 1899 – 17 September 1978) was a French footballer who played as a forward for Red Star in the early 1920s.

== Career ==
Born in Saint-Ouen-sur-Seine on 26 May 1899, Cordon began his football career at his hometown club Red Star in 1919, aged 20.

Together with Pierre Chayriguès, Lucien Gamblin, and Paul Nicolas, he was a member of the Red Star team that won back-to-back Coupe de France titles in 1922 and 1923, starting in both finals where he helped his side defeat Rennes (2–0) and Sète (4–2), scoring one of the goals in the latter final. The following day, the journalists of the French newspaper L'Auto (the future L'Équipe) stated that he "distinguished himself on the right wing with good runs, but he also needs a rest".

On 12 February 1922, Cordon started in the final of the 1922 Ligue de Paris against Olympique, assisting the opening goal of the match after providing a precise cross at the end of a run at full speed; his side went on to win 3–0. He stayed at Red Star until 1926, when he retired. The previous year, on 19 April 1925, he was called up by the France national team for the first time, remaining an unused substitute in the friendly match against Austria at Stade Pershing; France won 4–0.

== Honours ==
Red Star

- Coupe de France: 1921–22, 1922–23
- Ligue de Paris: 1922

== Biography ==
- Berthou, Thierry (1999). Dictionnaire historique des clubs de football français [Historical dictionary of French football clubs] (in French). Créteil: Pages de Foot. ISBN 2-913146-01-5.
