= Billy Cornelius =

English footballer and manager

Personal information
- Full name: William Cornelius
- Date of birth: 1898
- Place of birth: Belvedere, Kent, England
- Position: Striker

Senior career*
Years	Team	Apps	(Gls)
–1922	Belvedere & District	–	(–)
1922–	Sète	–	(–)
	Alès	–	(–)

Managerial career
- Alès
- * Club domestic league appearances and goals

William Cornelius (born 1898) was an English professional football player and manager.

== Career ==
Cornelius was born in Bevedere, Kent in 1898. He played football for Belvedere & District, before venturing to France in 1922 to join FC Sète. Cornelius was brought over to the country along with fellow countryman Arthur Parkes by Scottish coach Victor Gibson. With Sète, he played in the 1923 Coupe de France Final against Red Star Olympique. In the match, Cornelius scored the team's opening goal, however, the club was unable to overcome the 3–1 deficit and were defeated 4–2. After his stint with Sète, Cornelius joined Olympique Alès and served in a player-coach role.
