= Brassy, Nièvre =

Brassy
- Commune
- Location of Brassy
- Location within France Location within Bourgogne-Franche-Comté
- Coordinates: 47°15′45″N 3°56′11″E
- Country: France
- Region: Bourgogne-Franche-Comté
- Department: Nièvre
- Arrondissement: Château-Chinon (Ville)
- Canton: Corbigny
- Intercommunality: Morvan Sommets et Grands Lacs

Government
  - Mayor (2020–2026): Jean-Sébastien Halliez
- Area^{1}: 54.15 km^{2} (20.91 sq mi)
- Highest elevation: 652 m (2,139 ft)
- Lowest elevation: 387 m (1,270 ft)
- Population (2023): 603
  - Density: 11.1/km^{2} (28.8/sq mi)
- Time zone: UTC+01:00 (CET)
  - Summer (DST): UTC+02:00 (CEST)
- INSEE/Postal code: 58037 /58140
- ^{1} French Land Register data, which excludes lakes, ponds, glaciers > 1 km^{2} (0.386 sq mi or 247 acres) and river estuaries.

Brassy (French pronunciation: [bʁasi]) is a commune in the Nièvre department in central France.

== Population ==
Historical population
Year	Pop.	±% p.a.
1968	774	—
1975	693	−1.57%
1982	637	−1.20%
1990	569	−1.40%
1999	574	+0.10%
2007	628	+1.13%
2012	623	−0.16%
2017	611	−0.39%
2023	603	−0.22%
Source: INSEE

== See also ==
- Communes of the Nièvre department
- Parc naturel régional du Morvan
