= 1919 USFSA Football Championship =

Statistics of the USFSA Football Championship in the 1919 season.

== 1/8 Final ==
- Alliance vélo sport d'Auxerre 5–0 Racing club bourguignon Dijon
- Olympique de Marseille 16–0 SPMSA Romans
- RC Paris 2–1 SS Romilly
- Club Sportif et Malouin Servannais 4–0 Club sportif d'Alençon
- Club Olympique Choletais 1–1 AS limousine Poitiers
- Stade Bordelais UC 6–0 Stadoceste tarbais
- Le Havre AC 2–0 Stade vélo club Abbeville
- Club Sportif des Terreaux – CAS Montluçon (Montluçon forfeited)

== Quarterfinals ==
- Club sportif des Terreaux 3–1 Alliance vélo sport d'Auxerre
- Olympique de Marseille 2–1 Stade Bordelais UC
- Le Havre AC 1–0 RC Paris
- Club Sportif et Malouin Servannais – Club Olympique Choletais (Cholet forfeited)

== Semifinals ==
- Olympique de Marseille 1–1 Club sportif des Terreaux
- Le Havre AC 4–0 Club Sportif et Malouin Servannais

== Final ==
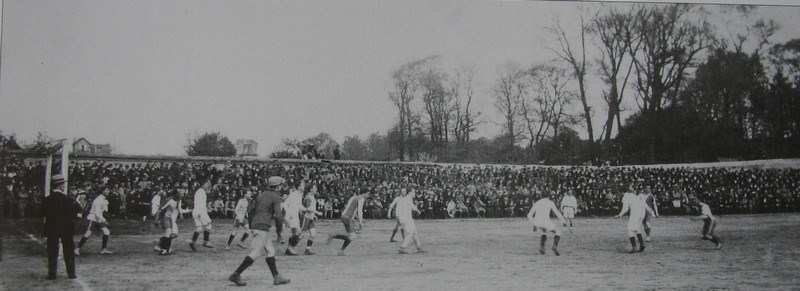
Final : Le Havre AC - Olympique de Marseille

- Le Havre AC 4–1 Olympique de Marseille
