= Philippe Bonnardel =

French footballer (1899-1953)

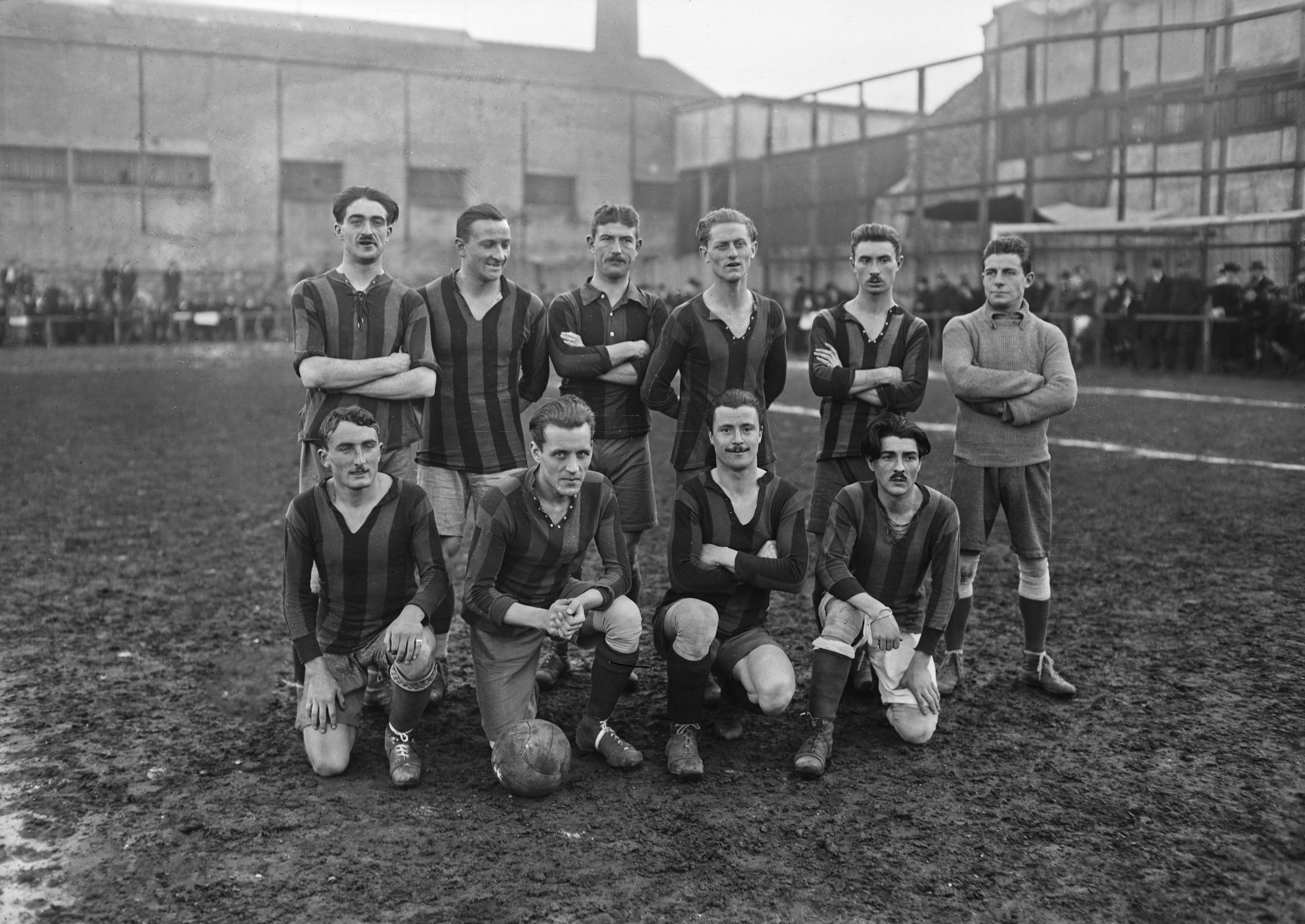

Personal information
- Full name: Philippe Bonnardel
- Date of birth: 28 July 1899
- Place of birth: Paris, France
- Date of death: 17 February 1953 (aged 53)
- Position: Midfielder

Youth career
- L'Amicale
- Joinville
- Gallia Club Paris

Senior career*
Years	Team	Apps	(Gls)
1920–1927	Red Star FC	–	(–)
1927–	Quevilly	–	(–)
	CASG Paris	–	(–)

International career
1920–1927	France	23	(0)
- * Club domestic league appearances and goals

Philippe Bonnardel (28 July 1899 – 17 February 1953) was a French international footballer. He is mostly known for his international career and his club stint at Red Star FC where he won three straight Coupe de France titles from 1921 to 1923. Bonnardel made his international debut on 29 February 1920 in a 2–0 victory over Switzerland. He was a member of the France team that participated in the football tournament at the 1924 Summer Olympics. In his final match as an international, he wore the armband in a 4–0 defeat to Portugal.
