= Paul Seitz (footballer) =

French footballer (1897-1979)

Paul Seitz (15 July 1897 – 22 February 1979) was a French footballer.

He spent his entire career as a footballer at Olympique de Marseille (from 1919 to 1926) and took the club to two Coupes de Frances (in 1924 as a defender and in 1926 as a goalkeeper). In 1921, he refused to play for the France national football team. He was also coach of the phocéen club in 1942.

== Sources ==
Pierre-Marie Descamps; Gérard Ejnès; Jacques Hennaux (2007). Coupe de France: La folle épopée (in French). L'Équipe. ISBN 978-2-915535-62-4.
