= Ernest Clère =

French footballer (1897–1967)

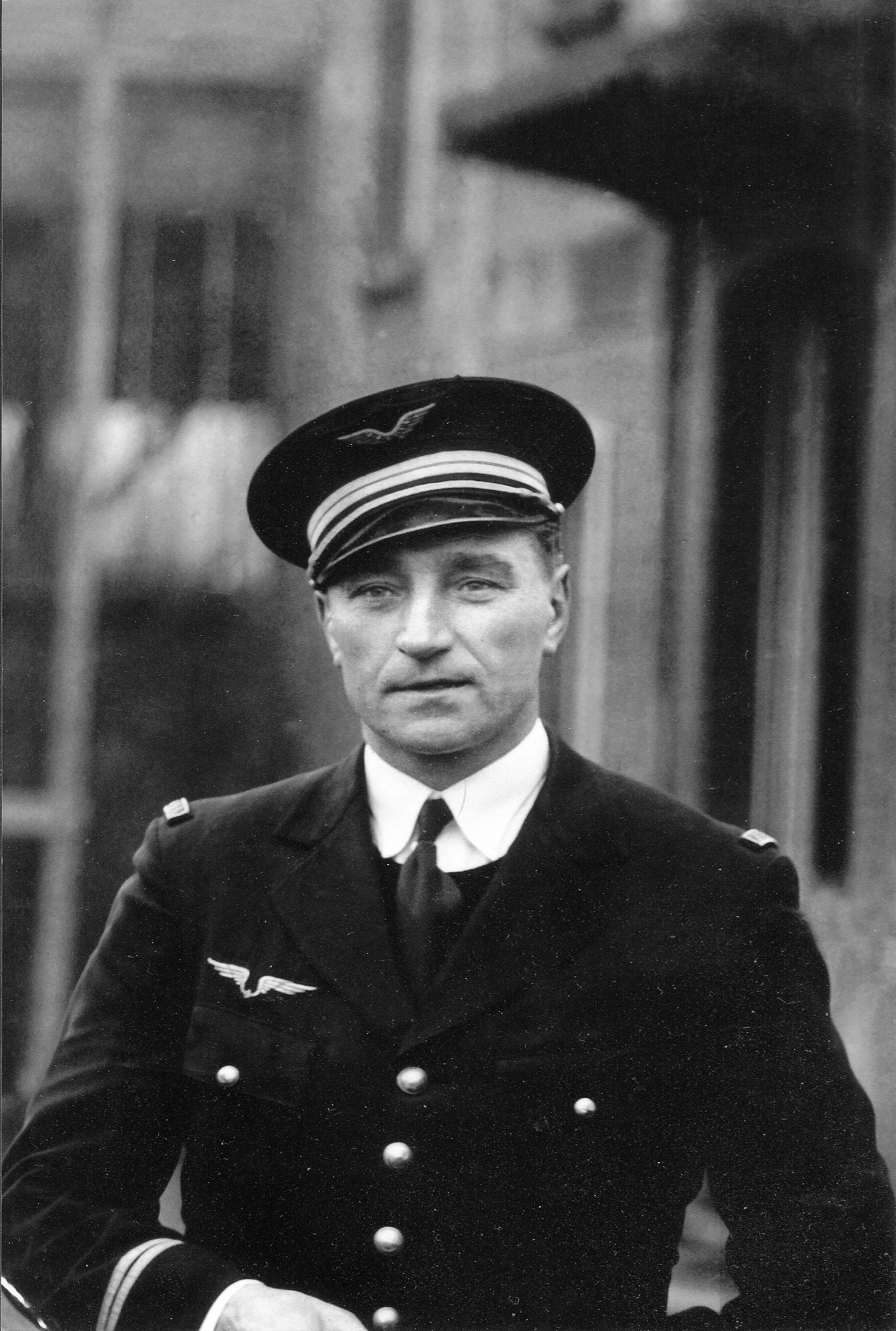

Personal information
- Full name: Ernest Victor Clère
- Date of birth: 22 January 1897
- Place of birth: Brassy, Nièvre, France
- Date of death: 5 March 1967 (aged 70)
- Place of death: Suresnes, Paris France
- Height: 1.75 m (5 ft 9 in)
- Position: Midfielder

Senior career*
Years	Team	Apps	(Gls)
1918–1920	Olympique de Pantin		
1920–1921	Clichy Olympique		
1921–1925	Olympique de Pantin		
1925–1928	Olympique de Marseille		
1928–1929	FEC Levallois		
1929–1931	CASG Marseille		
1931–1934	Olympique de Marseille (reserve)		

International career
1924	France	1	(0)
- * Club domestic league appearances and goals

Ernest Victor Clère (22 January 1897 – 3 May 1967) was a French footballer who played as a midfielder for Olympique de Pantin, Olympique de Marseille, and the French national team in the 1920s.

== Biography ==
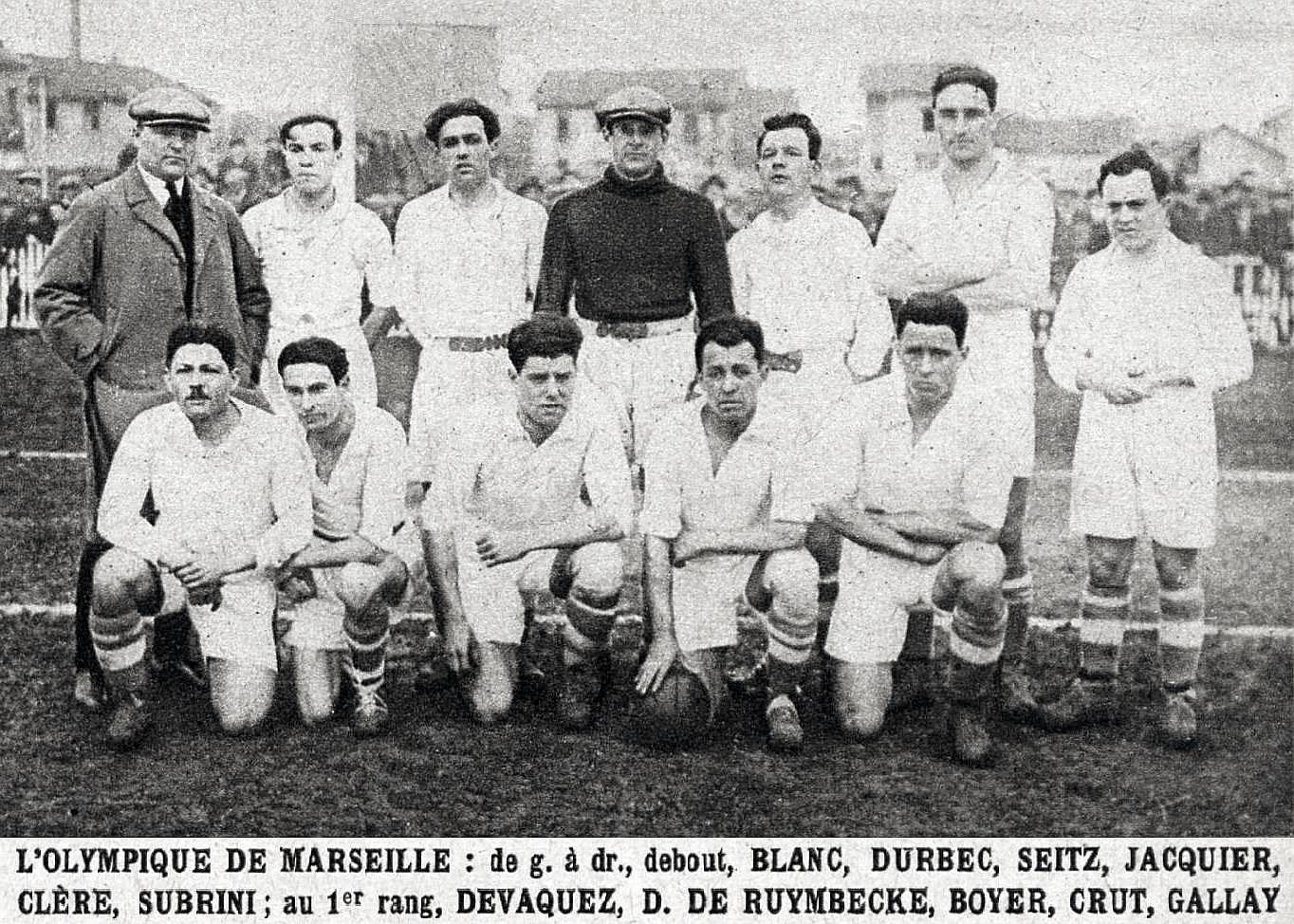
Clère (standing, second from right) with the Olympique de Marseille team in March 1926.

Born in Brassy, Nièvre, on 22 January 1897, (Note: Some sources wrongly state that he was born on 13 December 1901.) Clère received the War Crosses of both 1914–1918 and 1939–1945, and later a Knight of the Legion of Honour. When the First World War ended in 1918, the 21-year-old Clère began his football career at Olympique de Pantin (currently known as Olympique de Paris), and after a short stint at Clichy Olympique, he returned to Pantin. He stayed loyal to this club for four years, from 1921 to 1925, when Olympique de Marseille signed him.

On 23 March 1924, the 27-year-old Clère earned his first (and only) international cap for France in a friendly match against Switzerland at Geneve, which ended in a 3–0 loss.

Together with Edouard Crut, Jean Boyer, and Jules Dewaquez, he was a member of the OM team coached by Victor Gibson that won back-to-back Coupe de France titles in 1926 and 1927, the latter as the team's captain. In the semifinals of the 1926 edition, OM defeated Stade Français 5–0, but the local press stated that "Clère, whose main quality was to mow down his opponents in any position, was immediately asked to stop his game" by the firm refereeing of Mr. Jones. He stayed at OM for four years, from 1925 to 1929, having scored a total of 3 goals in 13 cup matches.

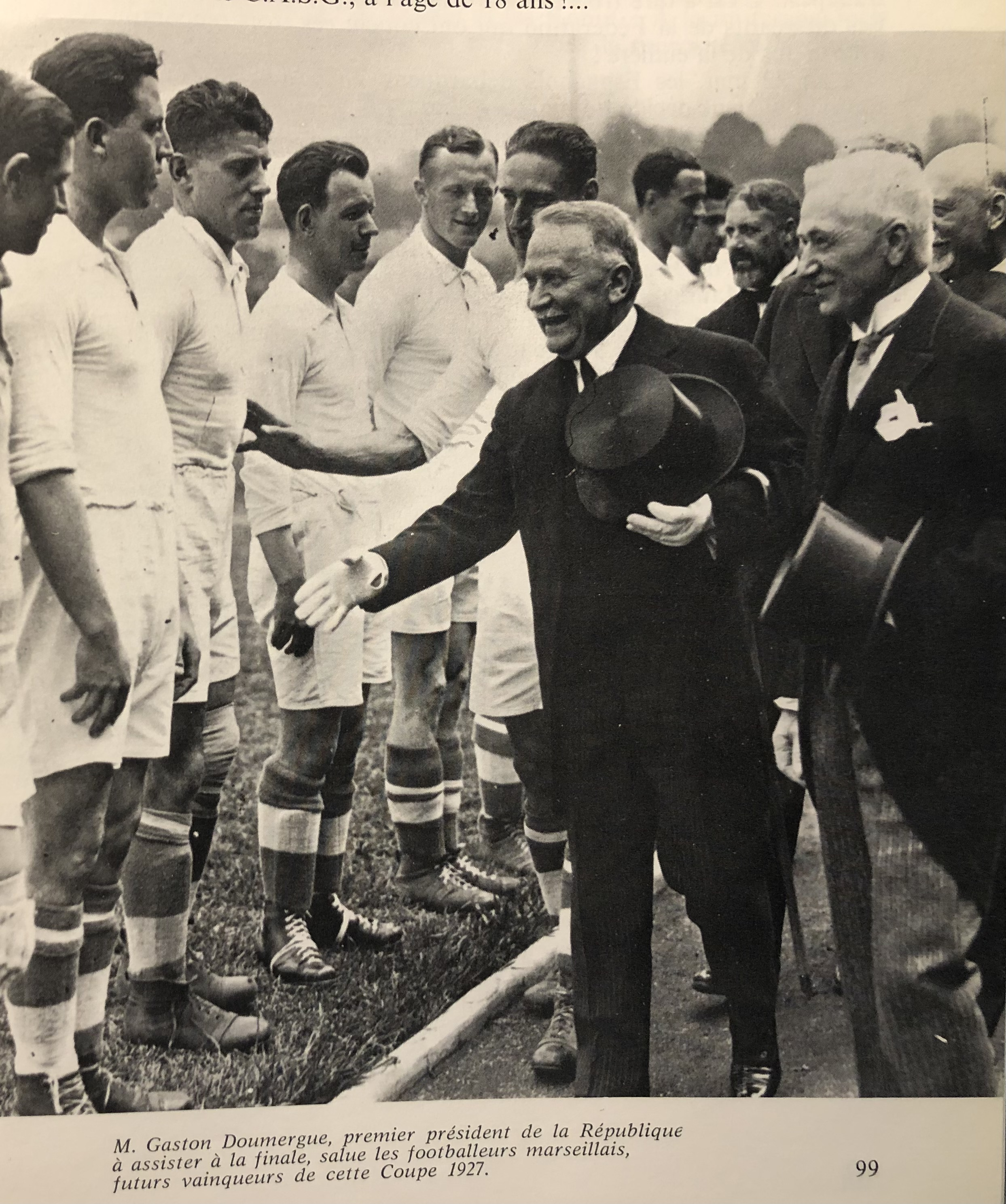
Gaston Doumergue, President of France, greeting the OM footballers, and Clère, OM's captain, in the background (1927).

Clère played his last seasons of football at FEC Levallois (1928–29), CASG Marseille (1929–31), and finally the reserve team of Olympique de Marseille from 1931 to 1934, when he retired at the age of 37.

Clère died in Suresnes on 3 May 1967, at the age of 70.

== Honours ==
Marseille

- Coupe de France: 1926, 1927
