= Édouard Crut =

French footballer (1901-1974)

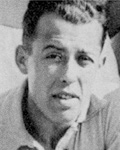

Personal information
- Date of birth: 16 April 1901
- Place of birth: Neuilly-sur-Seine, France
- Date of death: 24 October 1974 (aged 73)
- Position: Striker

Senior career*
Years	Team	Apps	(Gls)
1920–1921	Étoile Carouge		
1921–1922	US Saint-Mandé		
1922–1923	Gallia Club Lunel		
1923–1927	Marseille		
1927–1932	OGC Nice		
1932–1934	FAC Nice		
1934–1935	AS Cannes		
1935–1936	Marseille		

International career
1924–1927	France	8	(6)
- * Club domestic league appearances and goals

Édouard Crut (16 April 1901 – 24 October 1974) was a French footballer who played for Étoile Carouge, US Saint-Mandé, Gallia Club Lunel, Marseille, OGC Nice, FAC Nice and AS Cannes, as well as for the French national side.
