= AS Valentigney =

French football club

- Full name: Association Sportive de Valentigney
- Founded: 1920
- Ground: Stade des Longines, Valentigney
- Capacity: 200
- League: Ligue Bourgogne-Franche-Comté de Football
Home colours	Away colours

Association Sportive de Valentigney is a French football club located in Valentigney, France.

== History ==
AS Valentigney was founded in 1920, in Valentigney, France. An amateur club for most of their existence, they made it to the 1926 Coupe de France Final, where they lost 4–1 to Olympique de Marseille. Privately managed by Peugeot, Valentigney's early successes inspired the Peugeot management team to create FC Sochaux-Montbéliard in 1928. From 1942 to 1944 during World War II, Sochaux and Valentigney briefly merged to create FC Sochaux Valentigney, but thereafter separated and ran independently again.

== Colours and badge ==
AS Valentigney's colors are red and white.

== Honours ==
- Coupe de France
  - Runners-up: 1925–26
- Championnat de France Amateur
  - Winners: 1935–36
