= Jules Dewaquez =

French footballer (1899–1971)

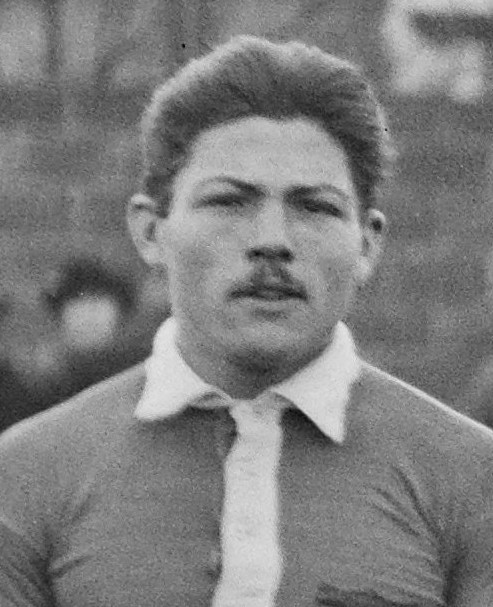

Personal information
- Full name: Jules Aimé Devaquez
- Date of birth: 9 March 1899
- Place of birth: Paris, France
- Date of death: 12 June 1971 (aged 72)
- Place of death: Lyon, France
- Height: 1.69 m (5 ft 7 in)
- Position: Striker

Senior career*
Years	Team	Apps	(Gls)
1915–1917	US Saint-Denis		
1917–1924	Olympique de Pantin/Paris		
1924–1930	Marseille		
1930–1933	Nice		
1933–1934	AS Béziers		

International career
1920–1929	France	41	(12)

Managerial career
- 1933–1934: AS Béziers
- 1936–1937: Montpellier
- 1945–1946: FC Grenoble
- 1946–1947: Marseille
- AS Aix
- Lyon
- * Club domestic league appearances and goals

Jules Aimé Devaquez (9 March 1899 – 12 June 1971), known as Jules Dewaquez, was a French amateur footballer, who played for both club and country on the right wing. He was of shorter stature (1.69m) and renowned for his small moustache. By profession he was a technical draughtsman, but he became one of the most successful French players during the 1920s. As a player, he was an agile and fast dribbler, had a powerful shot and was also an extraordinarily strong header of the ball – unusual for someone of his size and playing position.

== Playing career ==
Born in Paris, Dewaquez started his football career with US Saint-Denis, based in Saint-Denis, in 1915, before moving in 1917 to Olympique de Pantin (which became Olympique de Paris), where he won the French Cup in 1918, and was a finalist in 1919 and 1921.

His first international selection was on 18 January 1920 in a 9–4 defeat by Italy. In his next match, on 29 February he scored in a 2–0 victory over Switzerland, and appeared in all France's international matches in 1920, including two matches in the 1920 Olympics held in Antwerp, being eliminated in a 4–1 defeat by Czechoslovakia. He was selected for all the French internationals over the next two years, including a match against an England amateur XI on 5 May 1921, when he scored in a 2–1 victory. This was the first time in which a France national team had defeated its English equivalent. This game is recognised as a full international by the French Football Federation but not by the Football Association who consider it as an amateur match. (Of the England players, only Bert Coleman, Alfred Bower and Albert Read were later selected for the full England XI.)

The first match against France officially recognized by the FA came on 10 May 1923, when Dewaquez scored France's 89th minute consolation goal in a 4–1 defeat, with England's goals coming from Kenneth Hegan (two), Charlie Buchan and Norman Creek. The following year, on 17 May 1924, Dewaquez again scored France's goal in a 3–1 defeat against England, with England's goals coming from Vivian Gibbins (two) and Harry Storer.

Dewaquez was a member of France's squad for the 1924 Olympic Games, held in Paris, where they were defeated 5–1 by eventual winners Uruguay, after defeating Lithuania 7–0 in the first round.

In the summer of 1924, he moved to Olympique de Marseille. His only international selection in 1925 was against England on 21 May, when he again scored in a 3–2 defeat. In this match, England's goalkeeper Freddie Fox had to leave the field in the 75th minute following a head injury sustained in a charge by Dewaquez when scoring his goal, and was prevented from completing his sole appearance for England. Following an earlier withdrawal by goalscorer Vivian Gibbins, England finished with nine men, but managed to hang on to win the game.

He helped OM win the French Cup in 1926, when he scored twice in a 4–1 victory over AS Valentigney, and again in 1927 when he scored in a 3–0 victory over US Quevilly. He was now no longer an automatic choice for the France national team, but was, however, selected for France for the 1928 Olympics, held in Amsterdam, where France were eliminated by Italy 4–3. In 1929, he appeared in five of France's international matches, scoring twice – against England in a 4–1 defeat on 9 May (England's goals were scored by Edgar Kail and George Camsell (2 each)) and in his final International appearance, in another 4–1 defeat against Belgium on 17 May. In his international career, he played 41 times scoring 12 goals, of which four came against England. He was captain four times and his pairing with Raymond Dubly as the two wingers until 1925 was one of the most exciting in Europe. His total of international appearances was the French record, until Étienne Mattler exceeded it in 1938.

By now, his amateur status was rather dubious; ostensibly he worked in the retail trade, but was in receipt of substantial bonus payments and expenses from OM and was in reality a “secret professional”. In 1930 he moved on to OGC Nice for three years, turning professional in 1932, before finishing his playing career with AS Béziers where he became a player/coach, finally hanging up his boots in 1934.

== Career as a coach ==
After the Second World War, he became trainer at FC Grenoble, Olympique de Marseille, AS Aix-en-Provence and finally at Lyon OU. After retiring from football, he became a departmental manager at one of the largest Renault dealers in Lyon.

== Honours ==
Olympique de Paris

- Coupe de France: 1917–18; runner-up: 1918–19, 1920–21

Olympique de Marseille

- Coupe de France: 1925–26, 1926–27
