= Victor Gibson =

English footballer (1888–1958)

Personal information
- Full name: Arthur Henry Gibson
- Date of birth: 18 July 1888
- Place of birth: Woolwich, England
- Date of death: 8 April 1958 (aged 69)
- Place of death: Ruislip, England
- Position: Defender

Senior career*
Years	Team	Apps	(Gls)
- Morton
- Falkirk
- Plumstead
1911–1912	Espanyol		
1912–1924	Olympique Cettois		
1924–1926	Montpellier		

Managerial career
- 1911–1912: Espanyol
- 1912: Catalonia
- 1914–1924: Olympique Cettois
- 1924–1925: Montpellier
- 1925–1929: Marseille
- 1929–1934: Sochaux
- 1934: SC Bastidienne
- 1934–1935: Hispano-Bastidienne
- * Club domestic league appearances and goals

Arthur Henry Gibson, also known as Victor Raine Gibson (18 July 1888 – 8 April 1958) was an English professional footballer who played as a midfielder for RCD Espanyol, and later a coach active in Spain and France.

== Early and personal life ==
Arthur Henry Gibson was born in Woolwich in 1888. He married in 1910 and had an infant daughter who died. He divorced his English wife in 1938 and married a Frenchwoman in 1939, with whom he also had a daughter.

== Playing career ==
Gibson played for Morton, Falkirk, and Plumstead, and in 1911 he toured Catalonia with the latter club; in a match against Espanyol on 18 May 1911, he impressed the Catalan club and they signed him, along with Frank Allack and William Hodge.

Gibson quickly became the team's captain, and took on the role of manager. In July 1912, Allack and Gibson were dismissed from Espanyol for various acts of indiscipline, and he moved to French side Olympique Cettois. On 5 April 1914, Gibson started as a defender in the final of the 1914 USFSA Football Championship, which ended in a 0–3 loss to Olympique lillois. He stayed at the club for 12 years until 1924, when he moved to Montpellier, where he retired two years later in 1926, at the age of 38.

== Coaching career ==
While in Spain, Gibson performed the functions of a coach with the Catalonia national team once, in what was the team's first-ever game recognized by FIFA on 20 February 1912, which ended in a 7–0 loss to France. In France, Gibson coached the club sides of FC Cette, Montpellier, Marseille, Sochaux, SC Bastidienne and Hispano-Bastidienne.

Gibson led FC Cette to back-to-back finals in the Coupe de France in 1923 and 1924, but lost both, the first as coach (4–2 to Red Star Olympique), and the second as player and coach (3–2 to Marseille). However, he achieved his revenge by winning this cup twice in a row in 1926 and 1927 with Olympique de Marseille, beating AS Valentigney 4–1 in the former and US Quevilly 3–0 in the latter. He also led Sochaux to a title in the 1931 Peugeot Cup.

== Later life and death ==
Gibson returned to England in the 1930s, working as a gardener and groundsman. He divorced his English wife in 1938 and married a Frenchwoman in 1939, with whom he also had a daughter. He died in Ruislip 8 April 1958, at the age of 69.

== Honours ==
=== As a player ===
FC Sète

- USFSA Football Championship:
  - Runner-up (1): 1914

=== As a manager ===
FC Sète

- Coupe de France
  - Runner-up (2): 1923 and 1924

Olympique de Marseille

- Coupe de France
  - Champions (2): 1926 and 1927

Sochaux

- Peugeot Cup
  - Champions (1): 1931
