= Jean Boyer (footballer) =

French footballer (1901-1981)

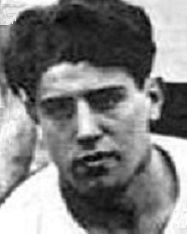

Personal information
- Date of birth: 13 February 1901
- Place of birth: Vitry-sur-Seine, France
- Date of death: 24 November 1981 (aged 80)
- Place of death: Paris, France

International career
Years	Team	Apps	(Gls)
- France

Jean Boyer (13 February 1901 – 24 November 1981) was a French footballer. He competed at the 1920 Summer Olympics and the 1924 Summer Olympics.
