= List of France international footballers (1–4 caps) =

Players of the France national football team with 1 to 4 caps

The France national football team played its first international match on 1 May 1904, drawing 3–3 with Belgium in Uccle. In total, over 800 players have represented the Germany national team. This list covers players with between one and four caps for the national team organised by the French Football Federation (FFF). The players are listed in alphabetical order of surname. All statistics are correct up to and including the match played on 23 March 2025 against Croatia.

== Key ==
Positions key
GK	Goalkeeper
DF	Defender
MF	Midfielder
FW	Forward

Player
This colour background and the * symbol indicate that the player is currently active at the club level.
Position
Playing positions are listed according to the player's primary position while playing for the national team.
Caps and goals
Caps and goals comprise those in the qualifying and final tournaments of the FIFA World Cup and UEFA European Championship, as well as the Summer Olympics (pre-World War II), FIFA Confederations Cup, UEFA Nations League and international friendly matches.

== Players ==
Germany national football team players with between 1 and 4 caps
Player	Pos.	Caps	Goals	Debut		Last or most recent match		Ref.
Player	Pos.	Caps	Goals	Date	Opponent	Date	Opponent	Ref.
Marcel Adamczyk	DF	1	0	29 September 1963	Bulgaria	29 September 1963	Bulgaria	
Ruben Aguilar	DF	1	0	11 November 2020	Finland	11 November 2020	Finland	
Georges-Henri Albert	MD	1	0	22 October 1908	Denmark	22 October 1908	Denmark	
Charles Allé	GK	1	0	26 May 1929	Belgium	26 May 1929	Belgium	
André Allègre	MF	1	0	31 May 1914	Hungary	31 May 1914	Hungary	
Morgan Amalfitano	MF	1	0	29 February 2012	Germany	29 February 2012	Germany	
Matthieu André	MF	3	0	13 December 1936	Yugoslavia	21 February 1937	Belgium	
Bernard Antoinette	MF	2	0	24 January 1937	Australia	21 February 1937	Belgium	
Houssem Aouar	MF	1	0	7 October 2020	Ukraine	7 October 2020	Ukraine	
Emmanuel Aznar	MF	1	1	24 March 1938	Bulgaria	24 March 1938	Bulgaria	
Benoît Badiashile	DF	2	0	22 September 2022	Australia	25 September 2022	Denmark	
Pascal Baills	DF	1	0	30 March 1991	Albania	30 March 1991	Albania	
Tiemoué Bakayoko	MF	1	0	28 March 2017	Spain	28 March 2017	Spain	
Edmond Baraffe	FW	3	0	2 December 1964	Belgium	20 April 1966	Belgium	
François Barat	DF	2	0	9 May 1909	Belgium	22 May 1909	England Amateurs	
Paul Baron	MF	1	0	22 April 1923	Switzerland	22 April 1923	Switzerland	
Jean Bastien	MF	4	0	5 June 1938	Belgium	6 December 1945	Australia	
Zacharie Baton	GK	4	0	1 November 1906	England Amateurs	12 April 1908	Belgium	
Georges Bayrou	FW	1	0	22 October 1908	Denmark	22 October 1908	Denmark	
Georges Beaucourt	DF	1	0	13 December 1936	Yugoslavia	13 December 1936	Yugoslavia	
Maurice Beaudier	GK	3	0	8 February 1921	Ireland Amateur	6 March 1921	Belgium	
Paul-Émile Bel	MF	1	0	22 March 1925	Italy	22 March 1925	Italy	
Jean Belver	DF	1	0	4 June 1950	Belgium	4 June 1950	Belgium	
Abdelkader Ben Bouali	DF	1	0	23 May 1937	Ireland	23 May 1937	Ireland	
Abdesselem Ben Mohammed	FW	1	0	25 November 1953	Ireland	25 November 1953	Ireland	
Mustapha Ben M'Barek	FW	1	0	4 June 1950	Belgium	4 June 1950	Belgium	
Abdelaziz Ben Tifour	MF	4	0	22 May 1952	Belgium	6 October 1957	Hungary	
Ali Benouna	FW	2	0	9 February 1936	Czechoslovakia	8 March 1936	Belgium	
Grégoire Berg	DF	1	0	30 April 1922	Spain	30 April 1922	Spain	
Philippe Bergeroo	GK	3	0	10 October 1979	United States	28 March 1984	Australia	
Charles Berthelot	GK	1	0	2 April 1923	Netherlands	2 April 1923	Netherlands	
André Betta	MF	2	0	25 September 1968	Germany	6 November 1968	Norway	
Henri Biancheri	MF	2	0	25 September 1960	Finland	28 September 1960	Poland	
Georges Bilot	DF	1	0	1 May 1904	Belgium	1 May 1904	Belgium	
Paul Bloch	MF	1	0	8 February 1921	Ireland Amateur	8 February 1921	Ireland Amateur	
Patrick Blondeau	DF	2	0	22 January 1997	Portugal	2 April 1997	Sweden	
Louis Bloquel	MF	2	0	11 November 1924	Belgium	22 March 1925	Italy	
Bernard Boissier	DF	1	0	26 April 1975	Portugal	26 April 1975	Portugal	
Bruno Bollini	DF	3	0	27 November 1957	England	15 March 1961	Belgium	
Georges Bon	MF	1	0	21 April 1907	Belgium	21 April 1907	Belgium	
Georges Bonello	FW	3	1	18 April 1926	Portugal	16 March 1927	Portugal	
René Bonnet	MF	1	0	8 February 1914	Luxembourg	8 February 1914	Luxembourg	
Richard Boucher	DF	3	0	1 September 1957	Iceland	18 October 1961	Belgium	
Louis Bournonville	GK	1	0	9 March 1913	Switzerland	9 March 1913	Switzerland	
Roger Boury	MF	1	0	20 April 1952	Portugal	20 April 1952	Portugal	
Farès Bousdira	MF	1	0	24 April 1976	Poland	24 April 1976	Poland	
Saïd Brahimi	FW	2	1	2 June 1957	Iceland	27 October 1957	Belgium	
Gabriel Braun	DF	1	0	15 December 1945	Belgium	15 December 1945	Belgium	
Gaston Brébion	FW	1	0	22 May 1909	England Amateurs	22 May 1909	England Amateurs	
Jérémie Bréchet	DF	3	0	1 June 2001	Australia	20 November 2002	Yugoslavia	
François Brisson	FW	2	0	10 November 1982	Netherlands	13 October 1984	Luxembourg	
Marius Bruat	MF	1	0	17 December 1953	Luxembourg	17 December 1953	Luxembourg	
Stéphane Bruey	FW	4	1	27 October 1957	Belgium	5 May 1962	Italy	
Fernand Brunel	FW	1	2	18 April 1926	Portugal	18 April 1926	Portugal	
Michel Brusseaux	FW	1	0	26 May 1938	England	26 May 1938	England	
Marcel Buré	FW	1	0	19 April 1925	Australia	19 April 1925	Australia	
Jean-Louis Buron	MF	4	1	29 September 1963	Bulgaria	25 December 1963	Belgium	
Gérard Buscher	FW	2	0	12 August 1986	Germany	19 August 1987	Switzerland	
Rémy Cabella	MF	4	0	27 May 2014	Norway	14 October 2014	Germany	
Pierre Cahuzac	MF	2	0	6 October 1957	Hungary	25 December 1957	Bulgaria	
Albert Caillet	MF	1	0	2 April 1923	Netherlands	2 April 1923	Netherlands	
Zoumana Camara	DF	1	0	1 June 2001	Australia	1 June 2001	Australia	
René Camard	FW	1	0	21 April 1907	Belgium	21 April 1907	Belgium	
Francis Camerini	DF	2	0	24 April 1971	Hungary	10 November 1971	Bulgaria	
Daniel Carpentier	DF	1	0	30 May 1954	Belgium	30 May 1954	Belgium	
Cédric Carrasso	GK	1	0	9 June 2011	Poland	9 June 2011	Poland	
Désiré Carré	MF	1	0	13 November 1949	Czechoslovakia	13 November 1949	Czechoslovakia	
Roger Carré	MF	2	0	26 May 1947	Netherlands	9 October 1949	Yugoslavia	
Georges Casolari	DF	3	0	25 December 1963	Belgium	23 May 1964	Hungary	
Raoul Chaisaz	GK	2	0	5 June 1932	Yugoslavia	9 June 1932	Bulgaria	
Paul Chandelier	MF	3	0	9 March 1913	Switzerland	29 March 1914	Italy	
Clément Chantôme	MF	1	0	12 October 2012	Japan	12 October 2012	Japan	
Max Charbit	MF	4	0	11 March 1934	Switzerland	19 May 1935	Hungary	
Lionel Charbonnier	GK	1	0	11 June 1997	Italy	11 June 1997	Italy	
Daniel Charles-Alfred	DF	4	0	23 May 1964	Hungary	2 December 1964	Belgium	
René Charrier	GK	2	0	26 March 1975	Hungary	26 April 1975	Portugal	
Yves Chauveau	GK	1	0	30 April 1969	Romania	30 April 1969	Romania	
Pierre Chesneau	FW	1	0	4 June 1924	Hungary	4 June 1924	Hungary	
Bruno Cheyrou	MF	3	0	21 August 2002	Tunisia	31 March 2004	Netherlands	
Bernard Chiarelli	MF	1	0	16 April 1958	Switzerland	16 April 1958	Switzerland	
Paul Chillan	FW	2	0	17 April 1963	Netherlands	28 April 1963	Brazil	
Pascal Chimbonda	DF	1	0	31 May 2006	Denmark	31 May 2006	Denmark	
Michaël Ciani	DF	1	0	3 March 2010	Spain	3 March 2010	Spain	
Raymond Cicci	MF	1	1	20 September 1953	Luxembourg	20 September 1953	Luxembourg	
Aly Cissokho	DF	1	0	11 August 2010	Norway	11 August 2010	Norway	
Ernest Clère	MF	1	0	23 March 1924	Switzerland	23 March 1924	Switzerland	
Robert Coat	DF	1	0	2 April 1923	Netherlands	2 April 1923	Netherlands	
Alfred Compeyrat	DF	3	0	9 May 1909	Belgium	30 April 1911	Belgium	
Sebastien Corchia	DF	1	0	15 November 2016	Ivory Coast	15 November 2016	Ivory Coast	
Alain Cornu	DF	1	0	11 April 1962	Poland	11 April 1962	Poland	
Benoît Costil	GK	1	0	15 November 2016	Ivory Coast	15 November 2016	Ivory Coast	
Jules Cottenier	DF	4	0	20 March 1932	Switzerland	10 May 1934	Netherlands	
Didier Couécou	DF	1	0	23 December 1967	Luxembourg	23 December 1967	Luxembourg	
Albert Courquin	MF	1	0	15 January 1922	Belgium	15 January 1922	Belgium	
Paul Courtin	FW	1	0	22 October 1966	Poland	22 October 1966	Poland	
Georges Crozier	GK	2	0	7 May 1905	Belgium	22 April 1906	Belgium	
Carlos Curbelo	DF	2	0	24 April 1976	Poland	22 May 1976	Hungary	
Stanislas Curyl	FW	2	0	11 November 1952	Ireland	16 November 1952	Ireland	
Jean-Pierre Cyprien	DF	1	0	16 February 1994	Italy	16 February 1994	Italy	
Ousmane Dabo	MF	3	0	20 June 2003	Japan	20 August 2003	Switzerland	
Stéphane Dakowski	GK	2	0	16 May 1951	Scotland	3 June 1951	Italy	
Alfred Dambach	GK	1	0	24 December 1944	Belgium	24 December 1944	Belgium	
Marcel Dangles	FW	1	0	10 May 1923	England	10 May 1923	England	
Georges Dard	MF	3	2	26 May 1947	Netherlands	27 May 1950	Scotland	
Sadi Dastarac	MF	1	0	19 October 1908	Denmark	19 October 1908	Denmark	
Jacques Davy	DF	1	0	1 May 1904	Belgium	1 May 1904	Belgium	
Héctor De Bourgoing	FW	3	2	11 April 1962	Poland	15 July 1966	Uruguay	
Gabriel De Michèle	DF	2	0	13 July 1966	Mexico	3 June 1967	Soviet Union	
Jean Degouve	DF	2	0	9 March 1913	Switzerland	8 February 1914	Luxembourg	
Patrick Delamontagne	MF	3	0	15 May 1981	Brazil	16 June 1987	Norway	
Jacques Delannoy	FW	1	0	5 June 1932	Yugoslavia	5 June 1932	Yugoslavia	
Jean Deloffre	MF	1	0	3 June 1967	Soviet Union	3 June 1967	Soviet Union	
Joseph Delvecchio	FW	1	0	3 April 1910	Belgium	3 April 1910	Belgium	
Julien Denis	MF	2	0	23 March 1908	England Amateurs	10 May 1908	Netherlands	
Serge Denis	MF	1	0	11 November 1924	Belgium	11 November 1924	Belgium	
Victor Denis	MF	1	0	10 May 1908	Netherlands	10 May 1908	Netherlands	
Maurice Depaepe	MF	1	0	25 February 1923	Belgium	25 February 1923	Belgium	
Jean Desgranges	FW	1	2	17 December 1953	Luxembourg	17 December 1953	Luxembourg	
Pascal Despeyroux	MF	3	0	27 January 1988	Israel	24 August 1988	Czechoslovakia	
Fernand Desrousseaux	GK	1	0	19 October 1908	Denmark	19 October 1908	Denmark	
Marcel Desrousseaux	MF	2	0	27 October 1935	Switzerland	10 October 1937	Switzerland	
Denis Devaux	DF	1	0	24 March 1965	Australia	24 March 1965	Australia	
Jacques Dhur	GK	1	0	16 March 1927	Portugal	16 March 1927	Portugal	
Fabrice Divert	FW	3	1	28 March 1990	Hungary	5 June 1992	Netherlands	
Jean-Pierre Dogliani	FW	1	1	22 March 1967	Romania	22 March 1967	Romania	
Jean-Luc Dogon	DF	1	0	28 July 1993	Russia	28 July 1993	Russia	
Stanislas Dombeck	MF	1	0	3 December 1958	Greece	3 December 1958	Greece	
Marcel Domingo	GK	1	0	4 April 1948	Italy	4 April 1948	Italy	
René Domingo	MF	1	0	27 November 1957	England	27 November 1957	England	
Désiré Doué	MF	1	0	23 March 2025	Croatia	23 March 2025	Croatia	
Julien du Rhéart	FW	3	0	22 April 1906	Belgium	1 January 1911	Hungary	
Jean Dubly	DF	1	0	22 October 1908	Denmark	22 October 1908	Denmark	
Jules Dubly	FW	1	0	29 March 1914	Italy	29 March 1914	Italy	
Albert Dubreucq	MF	1	0	26 March 1952	Sweden	26 March 1952	Sweden	
Gustave Dubus	FW	2	1	23 February 1930	Portugal	13 April 1930	Belgium	
Robert Dufour	FW	1	0	4 June 1924	Hungary	4 June 1924	Hungary	
Charles Dujardin	MF	1	0	9 March 1913	Switzerland	9 March 1913	Switzerland	
Michel Dupoix	MF	1	0	13 January 1924	Belgium	13 January 1924	Belgium	
Raymond Durand	MF	1	0	15 February 1931	Czechoslovakia	15 February 1931	Czechoslovakia	
Aimé Durbec	DF	1	0	12 June 1927	Hungary	12 June 1927	Hungary	
Émile Dusart	MF	1	0	31 May 1914	Hungary	31 May 1914	Hungary	
Raoul Dutheil	FW	1	0	14 April 1929	Spain	14 April 1929	Spain	
Richard Dutruel	GK	1	0	4 October 2000	Cambodia	4 October 2000	Cambodia	
Albert Eloy	FW	2	2	9 March 1913	Switzerland	8 February 1914	Luxembourg	
Daniel Eon	GK	3	0	5 June 1966	Soviet Union	3 June 1967	Soviet Union	
Vincent Estève	DF	1	0	24 April 1968	Yugoslavia	24 April 1968	Yugoslavia	
Robert Eucher	FW	1	0	10 May 1908	Netherlands	10 May 1908	Netherlands	
Jacques Faivre	FW	2	2	28 September 1961	Finland	18 October 1961	Belgium	
Gérard Farison	DF	1	0	24 April 1976	Poland	24 April 1976	Poland	
Fernand Faroux	FW	1	0	17 March 1912	Italy	17 March 1912	Italy	
Victor Farvacque	FW	1	0	21 February 1928	Republic of Ireland	21 February 1928	Republic of Ireland	
Julien Faubert	MF	1	1	16 August 2006	Bosnia and Herzegovina	16 August 2006	Bosnia and Herzegovina	
Paul Faure	MF	1	0	9 March 1919	Belgium	9 March 1919	Belgium	
René Fenouillère	FW	1	0	22 October 1908	Denmark	22 October 1908	Denmark	
Jean-Marc Ferratge	MF	1	0	10 November 1982	Netherlands	10 November 1982	Netherlands	
Bruno Ferrero	GK	1	0	5 May 1962	Italy	5 May 1962	Italy	
Jean Fidon	MF	1	0	12 June 1927	Hungary	12 June 1927	Hungary	
Emile Fiévet	DF	1	0	17 March 1912	Italy	17 March 1912	Italy	
Mathieu Flamini	MF	3	0	16 November 2007	Morocco	10 September 2008	Serbia	
Wesley Fofana	DF	1	0	16 June 2023	Gibraltar	16 June 2023	Gibraltar	
Charles Fosset	MF	2	0	31 October 1937	Netherlands	5 December 1937	Italy	
Laurent Fournier	MF	3	0	26 August 1992	Brazil	14 October 1992	Australia	
Raymond François	MF	1	0	8 March 1936	Belgium	8 March 1936	Belgium	
Roger Gabet	MF	3	0	23 April 1949	Netherlands	22 May 1949	England	
Marcel Galey	FW	3	1	24 February 1929	Hungary	14 April 1929	Spain	
René Gallice	MF	1	0	12 May 1951	Ireland	12 May 1951	Ireland	
Patrice Garande	FW	1	0	27 April 1988	Northern Ireland	27 April 1988	Northern Ireland	
René Gardien	FW	2	2	14 May 1953	Wales	11 June 1953	Sweden	
Bernard Gardon	DF	1	0	26 May 1973	Soviet Union	26 May 1973	Soviet Union	
Georges Garnier	FW	3	0	1 May 1904	Belgium	7 May 1905	Belgium	
Manuel Garriga	DF	1	0	1 November 1950	Belgium	1 November 1950	Belgium	
Maurice Gastiger	FW	3	1	8 February 1914	Luxembourg	28 March 1920	Belgium	
Jean Gautheroux	MF	2	0	23 February 1930	Portugal	13 December 1936	Yugoslavia	
Franck Gava	MF	3	0	9 October 1996	Turkey	12 November 1997	Scotland	
Bruno Germain	MF	1	0	18 November 1987	Germany	18 November 1987	Germany	
Charles Géronimi	MF	1	1	8 February 1914	Luxembourg	8 February 1914	Luxembourg	
Georges Géronimi	FW	1	0	23 April 1911	Switzerland	23 April 1911	Switzerland	
Raymond Gigot	FW	1	0	7 May 1905	Belgium	7 May 1905	Belgium	
Nicolas Gillet	DF	1	0	1 June 2001	Australia	1 June 2001	Australia	
Alfred Gindrat	DF	1	0	1 January 1911	Hungary	18 February 1912	Switzerland	
Jérôme Gnako	MF	1	0	14 October 1992	Australia	16 February 1994	Belgium	
Alain Goma	DF	1	0	9 October 1996	Turkey	19 August 1998	Australia	
Joseph Gonzales	DF	1	0	8 March 1936	Belgium	8 March 1936	Belgium	
Désiré Gosselin	FW	1	0	30 May 1926	Australia	30 May 1926	Australia	
Raymond Gouin	MF	2	0	9 May 1909	Belgium	22 May 1909	England Amateurs	
Dario Grava	DF	1	0	13 October 1973	Germany	13 October 1973	Germany	
Xavier Gravelaine	MF	4	0	14 October 1992	Australia	28 July 1993	Russia	
Maurice Gravelines	MF	2	0	28 March 1920	Belgium	15 January 1922	Belgium	
Gilbert Gress	FW	3	0	27 September 1967	Germany	9 October 1971	Hungary	
Raoul Gressier	MF	1	0	19 October 1908	Denmark	19 October 1908	Denmark	
Ernest Guéguen	FW	1	0	27 February 1913	England Amateurs	27 February 1913	England Amateurs	
Henri Guérin	DF	1	0	17 October 1948	Belgium	19 June 1949	Spain	
Henri Guerre	DF	1	0	9 May 1909	Belgium	9 May 1909	Belgium	
Maurice Guichard	GK	2	0	1 May 1904	Belgium	12 February 1905	Switzerland	
Malo Gusto	DF	1	0	13 October 2023	Netherlands	13 October 2023	Netherlands	
Edmond Haan	FW	4	0	12 May 1951	Ireland	11 November 1953	Switzerland	
Jean Hédiart	FW	1	0	25 March 1956	Australia	25 March 1956	Australia	
Charles Heiné	MF	2	0	1 June 1947	Belgium	8 June 1947	Switzerland	
Laurent Henric	GK	4	0	15 April 1928	Belgium	14 April 1929	Spain	
Pierrick Hiard	GK	1	0	9 September 1981	Belgium	9 September 1981	Belgium	
Michel Hidalgo	MF	1	0	5 May 1962	Italy	5 May 1962	Italy	
Rudi Hiden	GK	1	0	28 January 1940	Portugal	28 January 1940	Portugal	
Henri Hiltl	FW	2	0	28 January 1940	Portugal	24 December 1944	Belgium	
Victor Hitzel	FW	1	0	22 May 1909	England Amateurs	22 May 1909	England Amateurs	
Paul Hoenen	FW	1	0	2 April 1923	Netherlands	2 April 1923	Netherlands	
Henri Holgard	FW	1	0	19 October 1908	Denmark	19 October 1908	Denmark	
Daniel Horlaville	FW	1	0	30 April 1969	Romania	30 April 1969	Romania	
Pierre Hornus	MF	3	0	15 March 1931	Germany	29 November 1931	Netherlands	
Georges Houyvet	DF	1	0	9 June 1932	Bulgaria	9 June 1932	Bulgaria	
Léon Huot	DF	4	0	29 August 1920	Italy	20 June 1926	Belgium	
André Hurtevent	FW	1	0	16 March 1927	Portugal	16 March 1927	Portugal	
Jonathan Ikoné	MF	4	1	7 September 2019	Albania	14 October 2019	Turkey	
Gérard Isbecque	FW	4	1	25 February 1923	Belgium	11 November 1924	Belgium	
René Jacolliot	MF	1	0	16 February 1913	Belgium	16 February 1913	Belgium	
André Jacowski	DF	2	0	20 April 1952	Portugal	22 May 1952	Belgium	
Michel Jacques	FW	1	0	23 March 1947	Portugal	23 March 1947	Portugal	
Aimé Jacquet	MF	2	0	25 September 1968	Germany	17 October 1968	Spain	
Joseph Jadrejak	DF	3	0	26 May 1947	Netherlands	8 June 1947	Switzerland	
Georges Janin	MF	1	0	12 January 1937	Australia	12 January 1937	Australia	
Lucien Jasseron	MF	2	0	8 April 1945	Switzerland	26 May 1945	England	
Philippe Jeannol	DF	1	0	11 October 1986	Soviet Union	11 October 1986	Soviet Union	
Albert Jénicot	MF	3	0	8 March 1908	Switzerland	19 October 1908	Denmark	
Raymond Jouve	FW	1	0	22 April 1906	Belgium	22 April 1906	Belgium	
Robert Joyaut	MF	4	0	28 January 1923	Spain	22 April 1923	Switzerland	
Félix Julien	FW	2	0	9 May 1909	Belgium	22 May 1909	England Amateurs	
Franck Jurietti	DF	1	0	12 October 2005	Cyprus	12 October 2005	Cyprus	
Curt Keller	FW	1	0	10 October 1937	Switzerland	10 October 1937	Switzerland	
René Kenner	MF	1	0	15 April 1928	Belgium	15 April 1928	Belgium	
Raymond Kéruzoré	MF	2	0	17 November 1976	Ireland	11 May 1978	Iran	
Mahi Khennane	FW	2	0	18 October 1961	Belgium	12 November 1961	Bulgaria	
Ferenc Kocsur	MF	3	0	22 May 1952	Belgium	25 December 1952	Belgium	
Casimir Koza	FW	1	0	11 April 1962	Poland	11 April 1962	Poland	
Richard Krawczyk	MF	1	0	23 December 1967	Luxembourg	23 December 1967	Luxembourg	
Jean Pierre Kress	GK	1	0	17 December 1953	Luxembourg	17 December 1953	Luxembourg	
Maurice Lafont	DF	4	0	28 June 1958	Germany	26 October 1958	Germany	
Abel Lafouge	DF	1	0	12 January 1913	Italy	12 January 1913	Italy	
Roger Lamy	DF	2	0	27 May 1950	Scotland	1 November 1950	Belgium	
Eugène Langenove	DF	2	0	20 February 1921	Italy	6 March 1921	Belgium	
Thierry Laurey	MF	1	0	8 March 1989	Scotland	8 March 1989	Scotland	
Michel Lauri	MF	1	0	23 May 1937	Republic of Ireland	23 May 1937	Republic of Ireland	
Jean-Claude Lavaud	DF	1	0	22 March 1967	Romania	22 March 1967	Romania	
Gilbert Le Chenadec	DF	1	0	3 June 1967	Soviet Union	3 June 1967	Soviet Union	
Michel Leblond	MF	4	1	30 May 1954	Belgium	27 October 1957	England	
Jean Lechantre	FW	3	0	3 May 1947	England	11 December 1949	Yugoslavia	
Patrice Lecornu	FW	3	0	10 October 1979	United States	15 May 1981	Brazil	
Lucien Leduc	MF	4	1	7 April 1946	Czechoslovakia	19 May 1946	England	
Maxime Lehmann	DF	2	0	24 January 1935	Spain	8 March 1936	Belgium	
Robert Lemaître	DF	2	0	17 December 1953	Luxembourg	30 May 1954	Belgium	
Jean-Claude Lemoult	MF	2	0	31 May 1983	Belgium	5 October 1983	Spain	
Bernard Lenoble	DF	2	0	13 January 1924	Belgium	23 March 1924	Switzerland	
Émile Lesmann	FW	1	0	28 January 1912	Belgium	28 January 1912	Belgium	
Lucien Letailleur	FW	1	0	12 January 1913	Italy	12 January 1913	Italy	
Lionel Letizi	GK	4	0	11 October 1997	South Africa	28 March 2001	Spain	
Edmond Leveugle	FW	1	1	11 April 1926	Belgium	11 April 1926	Belgium	
Marceau Lherminé	FW	1	0	10 June 1933	Czechoslovakia	10 June 1933	Czechoslovakia	
Pierre Lienert	DF	1	0	19 April 1925	Australia	19 April 1925	Australia	
André Liminana	FW	2	0	22 March 1925	Italy	19 April 1925	Australia	
Marcel Loncle	FW	2	0	24 March 1965	Australia	18 April 1965	Yugoslavia	
Jean Loubière	GK	1	0	8 February 1914	Luxembourg	8 February 1914	Luxembourg	
Antonio Lozes	GK	3	0	23 February 1930	Portugal	13 April 1930	Belgium	
Jean Luciano	MF	4	1	30 October 1949	Yugoslavia	4 June 1950	Belgium	
François Ludo	DF	1	0	2 April 1961	Spain	2 April 1961	Spain	
Castello Lukeba	DF	1	0	17 October 2023	Scotland	17 October 2023	Scotland	
Edouard Macquart	FW	1	0	13 November 1921	Netherlands	13 November 1921	Netherlands	
Mickaël Madar	FW	3	1	11 October 1995	Romania	5 June 1996	Armenia	
Hervé Marc	FW	1	0	7 December 1930	Belgium	7 December 1930	Belgium	
Marcel Marchal	MF	1	0	30 January 1938	Belgium	30 January 1938	Belgium	
Yves Mariot	FW	1	0	26 April 1975	Portugal	26 April 1975	Portugal	
Serge Masnaghetti	FW	2	1	9 January 1963	Spain	25 December 1963	Belgium	
Fernand Massip	DF	1	0	27 February 1913	England Amateurs	27 February 1913	England Amateurs	
Jules Mathé	MF	2	1	18 May 1939	Belgium	21 May 1939	Wales	
Maurice Mathieu	DF	2	0	31 May 1914	Hungary	19 March 1919	Belgium	
Francis Méano	FW	2	0	11 December 1949	Yugoslavia	19 October 1952	Austria	
Rachid Mekhloufi	FW	4	0	21 October 1956	Soviet Union	25 December 1957	Bulgaria	
Bernard Mendy	DF	3	0	20 May 2004	Brazil	4 September 2004	Israel	
Maurice Mercery	FW	1	0	5 April 1920	England Amateurs	5 April 1920	England Amateurs	
Albert Mercier	MF	1	0	9 March 1919	Belgium	9 March 1919	Belgium	
Daniel Mercier	DF	3	0	3 April 1910	Belgium	15 May 1910	Italy	
François Mercier	MF	1	0	15 March 1942	Spain	15 March 1942	Spain	
Émilien Méresse	MF	1	0	13 December 1936	Yugoslavia	13 December 1936	Yugoslavia	
Camel Meriem	MF	3	0	17 November 2004	Poland	26 March 2005	Switzerland	
Maurice Meunier	FW	1	0	9 May 1909	Belgium	9 May 1909	Belgium	
Georges Meuris	DF	1	0	23 May 1937	Republic of Ireland	23 May 1937	Republic of Ireland	
Maurice Meyer	DF	1	0	8 February 1921	Ireland Amateur	8 February 1921	Ireland Amateur	
Francis Meynieu	DF	1	0	22 May 1976	Hungary	22 May 1976	Hungary	
Carmelo Micciche	FW	2	1	29 April 1987	Iceland	16 June 1987	Norway	
Ahmed Mihoubi	DF	1	0	25 November 1953	Ireland	25 November 1953	Ireland	
Roger Mindonnet	DF	4	0	27 April 1949	Scotland	19 June 1949	Spain	
Roland Mitoraj	DF	3	0	17 September 1967	Poland	17 October 1968	Spain	
Jules Monsallier	FW	3	0	17 May 1928	England	12 January 1936	Netherlands	
Charles Montagne	MF	3	1	9 March 1913	Switzerland	28 March 1920	Belgium	
Alexis Mony	DF	1	0	18 January 1920	Italy	18 January 1920	Italy	
Georges Moreel	FW	1	1	22 May 1949	England	22 May 1949	England	
Daniel Moreira	FW	3	0	20 November 2002	Yugoslavia	13 October 2004	Cyprus	
Pol Morel	FW	2	0	1 January 1911	Hungary	23 March 1911	England Amateurs	
Georges Moulène	MF	1	0	11 April 1926	Belgium	11 April 1926	Belgium	
Nordi Mukiele	DF	1	0	7 September 2021	Finland	7 September 2021	Finland	
Frédéric Née	FW	1	0	1 June 2001	Australia	1 June 2001	Australia	
Eugène Nicolaï	MF	2	0	12 February 1905	Switzerland	7 May 1905	Belgium	
Edmond Novicki	FW	2	1	8 March 1936	Belgium	12 January 1937	Australia	
Paul-Georges Ntep	MF	2	0	7 June 2015	Belgium	13 June 2015	Albania	
Aimé Nuic	FW	2	0	17 March 1935	Germany	12 January 1936	Netherlands	
Charles N'Zogbia	MF	2	0	11 August 2010	Norway	9 June 2011	Poland	
Louis Olagnier	MF	1	0	18 January 1920	Italy	18 January 1920	Italy	
Charles Orlanducci	DF	1	0	15 November 1975	Belgium	15 November 1975	Belgium	
Jean-Claude Osman	DF	1	0	8 September 1973	Greece	8 September 1973	Greece	
Marcel Ourdouillié	MF	1	0	15 December 1945	Belgium	15 December 1945	Belgium	
Georges Ouvray	FW	1	1	21 February 1928	Republic of Ireland	21 February 1928	Republic of Ireland	
Jean Pacot	FW	1	0	22 May 1909	England Amateurs	22 May 1909	England Amateurs	
Claude Papi	MF	3	0	21 November 1973	Denmark	10 June 1978	Hungary	
Antoine Parachini	MF	3	0	17 May 1924	England	1 June 1924	Uruguay	
Patrick Parizon	FW	3	1	26 March 1975	Hungary	25 May 1975	Iceland	
Michel Payen	MF	3	0	12 January 1937	Australia	21 March 1937	Germany	
Antoine Pazur	DF	1	0	17 December 1953	Luxembourg	17 December 1953	Luxembourg	
Robert Péri	DF	3	0	24 March 1965	Australia	27 September 1967	Germany	
Eugène Petel	MF	1	0	3 April 1910	Belgium	3 April 1910	Belgium	
René Petit	FW	2	0	29 August 1920	Italy	31 August 1920	Czechoslovakia	
Georges Peyroche	MF	3	0	16 March 1960	Chile	12 November 1961	Bulgaria	
Francis Piasecki	MF	3	0	7 October 1978	Luxembourg	25 February 1979	Luxembourg	
Jean Picy	FW	1	0	29 March 1914	Italy	29 March 1914	Italy	
Robert Pintenat	FW	3	1	27 March 1976	Czechoslovakia	22 May 1976	Hungary	
Frédéric Piquionne	FW	1	0	28 March 2007	Australia	28 March 2007	Australia	
Félix Pironti	FW	1	0	24 December 1944	Belgium	24 December 1944	Belgium	
Jean-Claude Piumi	DF	4	1	5 May 1962	Italy	3 June 1967	Soviet Union	
Marc Planus	DF	1	0	30 May 2010	Tunisia	30 May 2010	Tunisia	
Alassane Pléa	FW	1	0	20 November 2018	Uruguay	20 November 2018	Uruguay	
Pierre Pleimelding	FW	1	0	8 November 1978	Spain	8 November 1978	Spain	
René Pleimelding	DF	1	0	18 October 1953	Yugoslavia	18 October 1953	Yugoslavia	
Paul Poirier	MF	1	0	26 March 1933	Belgium	26 March 1933	Belgium	
Albert Polge	FW	3	0	25 May 1933	Wales	21 January 1934	Belgium	
Stéphane Porato	GK	1	0	13 November 1999	Croatia	13 November 1999	Croatia	
Cyrille Pouget	FW	3	0	24 January 1996	Portugal	27 March 1996	Belgium	
André Poullain	FW	3	2	27 February 1913	England Amateurs	20 April 1913	Luxembourg	
Félix Pozo	MF	1	0	22 March 1925	Italy	22 March 1925	Italy	
Louis Provelli	DF	1	0	22 March 1967	Romania	22 March 1967	Romania	
William Prunier	DF	1	0	26 August 1992	Brazil	26 August 1992	Brazil	
André Puget	FW	1	0	21 April 1907	Belgium	21 April 1907	Belgium	
Roger Quenolle	FW	2	0	22 May 1949	England	11 December 1949	Yugoslavia	
Bernard Rahis	FW	3	1	17 December 1959	Spain	2 April 1961	Spain	
Gilles Rampillon	MF	3	1	27 March 1976	Czechoslovakia	26 March 1980	Netherlands	
Pierre Ranzoni	MF	2	0	9 October 1949	Yugoslavia	10 December 1950	Netherlands	
Daniel Ravier	MF	2	0	8 September 1973	Greece	21 November 1973	Denmark	
André Renaux	GK	1	0	23 March 1908	England Amateurs	23 March 1908	England Amateurs	
Charles Renaux	MF	1	0	22 October 1908	Denmark	22 October 1908	Denmark	
Albert Rénier	FW	4	1	18 January 1920	Italy	11 November 1924	Belgium	
Pierre Repellini	DF	4	0	8 September 1973	Greece	18 May 1974	Argentina	
Robert Rico	FW	1	0	15 November 1970	Belgium	15 November 1970	Belgium	
Claude Robin	DF	4	0	28 September 1966	Hungary	27 September 1967	Germany	
Ferdinand Rochet	FW	1	0	12 January 1913	Italy	12 January 1913	Italy	
Daniel Rodighiero	FW	2	0	24 March 1965	Australia	3 June 1965	Argentina	
Joseph Rodriguez	FW	2	1	9 June 1932	Bulgaria	12 June 1932	Romania	
Sauveur Rodriguez	FW	1	0	26 May 1947	Netherlands	26 May 1947	Netherlands	
Jean-Philippe Rohr	MF	1	0	9 September 1987	Soviet Union	9 September 1987	Soviet Union	
Roger Rolhion	FW	4	2	15 March 1931	Germany	10 June 1933	Czechoslovakia	
André Rollet	DF	4	0	24 April 1927	Italy	12 June 1927	Hungary	
Felix Romano	Fw	1	1	20 April 1913	Luxembourg	20 April 1913	Luxembourg	
Paul Romano	DF	3	0	29 October 1911	Luxembourg	17 March 1912	Italy	
Georges Rose	DF	1	0	15 April 1934	Luxembourg	15 April 1934	Luxembourg	
Henri Roessler	MF	2	0	8 March 1942	Switzerland	15 March 1942	Spain	
Alfred Roth	DF	1	0	29 February 1920	Switzerland	29 February 1920	Switzerland	
Antoine Rouchès	FW	1	0	6 March 1921	Belgium	6 March 1921	Belgium	
Gilles Rousset	GK	2	0	21 January 1990	Kuwait	21 January 1990	Kuwait	
Laurent Roussey	FW	2	1	6 October 1982	Hungary	10 November 1982	Netherlands	
Serge Roy	FW	1	0	2 April 1961	Spain	2 April 1961	Spain	
Stéphane Ruffier	GK	3	0	11 August 2010	Norway	29 March 2015	Denmark	
Albert Rust	GK	1	0	28 June 1986	Belgium	28 June 1986	Belgium	
André Ryssen	FW	1	0	30 April 1922	Spain	30 April 1922	Spain	
Henri Salvano	FW	1	1	18 April 1926	Portugal	18 April 1926	Portugal	
Brice Samba	GK	3	0	16 June 2023	Gibraltar	23 March 2024	Germany	
Jean-Claude Samuel	MF	3	0	26 May 1945	England	15 December 1945	Belgium	
Christian Sarramagna	FW	4	0	8 September 1973	Greece	22 May 1976	Hungary	
Jean-Luc Sassus	DF	1	0	14 October 1992	Australia	14 October 1992	Australia	
Steve Savidan	FW	1	0	19 November 2008	Uruguay	19 November 2008	Uruguay	
Albert Schaff	FW	1	0	8 March 1914	Switzerland	8 March 1914	Switzerland	
Roland Schmitt	MF	2	0	22 January 1939	Poland	8 March 1942	Switzerland	
Louis Schubart	FW	3	0	22 April 1906	Belgium	22 October 1908	Denmark	
Ernest Schultz	FW	1	1	28 September 1961	Finland	28 September 1961	Finland	
Roger Scotti	MF	2	0	1 November 1950	Belgium	7 October 1956	Hungary	
Jean Sécember	FW	4	5	1 May 1932	Belgium	17 March 1935	Germany	
Yvon Segalen	MF	3	0	9 May 1929	England	26 May 1929	Belgium	
André Sellier	FW	1	0	15 May 1910	Italy	15 May 1910	Italy	
Didier Sénac	DF	3	0	21 November 1984	Bulgaria	14 October 1987	Norway	
Guy Sénac	MF	2	0	11 December 1960	Bulgaria	15 March 1961	Belgium	
Raymond Sentubéry	FW	3	0	11 November 1924	Belgium	30 May 1926	Australia	
Georges Sesia	FW	1	0	23 May 1948	Scotland	23 May 1948	Scotland	
Pierre Seyler	MF	2	1	21 February 1928	Republic of Ireland	11 March 1928	Switzerland	
Robert Siatka	MF	1	0	9 July 1960	Czechoslovakia	9 July 1960	Czechoslovakia	
Amara Simba	FW	3	2	14 August 1991	Poland	19 February 1992	England	
André Simonyi	FW	4	1	8 March 1942	Switzerland	8 April 1945	Switzerland	
Florent Sinama-Pongolle	FW	1	0	14 October 2008	Belgium	14 October 2008	Belgium	
Paul Sinibaldi	GK	1	0	4 June 1950	Belgium	4 June 1950	Belgium	
Pierre Sinibaldi	FW	2	0	19 May 1946	England	17 October 1948	Belgium	
Pierre Six	MF	2	0	19 October 1908	Denmark	19 October 1908	Denmark	
Henri Skiba	FW	3	0	1 March 1959	Belgium	16 December 1961	Bulgaria	
Ladislas Smid	MF	4	0	8 April 1945	Switzerland	15 December 1945	Belgium	
Édouard Stako	MF	3	1	1 March 1959	Belgium	23 May 1964	Hungary	
Michel Stievenard	FW	2	0	6 July 1960	Yugoslavia	9 July 1960	Czechoslovakia	
Julien Stopyra	FW	1	0	12 October 1960	Switzerland	12 October 1960	Switzerland	
Marceau Stricanne	MF	1	0	1 November 1951	Australia	1 November 1951	Australia	
Georges Stuttler	FW	1	0	20 June 1926	Belgium	20 June 1926	Belgium	
Jean-Claude Suaudeau	MF	4	0	28 September 1966	Hungary	22 March 1967	Romania	
Théodore Szkudlapski	MF	2	0	11 April 1962	Poland	29 September 1963	Bulgaria	
Jean Taillandier	GK	3	0	9 July 1960	Czechoslovakia	30 October 1960	Sweden	
Georges Taisne	FW	3	2	24 April 1927	Italy	12 June 1927	Hungary	
Joseph Tellechéa	MF	3	1	25 December 1955	Belgium	1 March 1959	Belgium	
Maurice Thédié	DF	1	0	22 March 1925	Italy	22 March 1925	Italy	
Jean-Christophe Thouvenel	DF	4	0	31 May 1983	Belgium	16 June 1987	Norway	
Khéphren Thuram	MF	1	0	24 March 2023	Netherlands	24 March 2023	Netherlands	
Philippe Tibeuf	FW	2	0	28 March 1990	Hungary	17 November 1990	Albania	
Maurice Tilliette	GK	2	0	10 May 1908	Netherlands	22 October 1908	Denmark	
Jean-Clair Todibo	DF	2	0	12 September 2023	Germany	18 November 2023	Gibraltar	
Bolek Tempowski	MF	1	0	3 May 1947	England	3 May 1947	England	
Ernest Tossier	DF	1	0	9 May 1909	Belgium	9 May 1909	Belgium	
Adolphe Touffait	MF	1	0	10 April 1932	Italy	10 April 1932	Italy	
Auguste Tousset	FW	2	1	16 April 1910	England Amateurs	12 January 1913	Italy	
Yves Triantafilos	FW	1	0	26 March 1975	Hungary	26 March 1975	Hungary	
Adrien Truffert	DF	1	0	25 September 2022	Denmark	25 September 2022	Denmark	
Richard Tylinski	DF	3	0	27 November 1957	England	12 October 1960	Switzerland	
Guy van Sam	FW	3	0	18 October 1961	Belgium	16 December 1961	Bulgaria	
Maurice Vandendriessche	MF	2	0	8 March 1908	Switzerland	23 March 1908	England Amateurs	
Roger Vandooren	FW	4	0	4 June 1949	Switzerland	6 February 1951	Yugoslavia	
Albert Vanucci	DF	2	0	23 March 1974	Romania	27 April 1974	Czechoslovakia	
François Vasse	DF	1	0	25 March 1934	Czechoslovakia	25 March 1934	Czechoslovakia	
Jules Verbrugge	FW	4	0	1 November 1906	England Amateurs	9 April 1911	Italy	
Jacques Vergnes	FW	1	1	8 September 1971	Norway	8 September 1971	Norway	
Félix Vial	FW	1	0	29 October 1911	Luxembourg	29 October 1911	Luxembourg	
Justin Vialaret	MF	1	0	19 October 1908	Denmark	19 October 1908	Denmark	
Marcel Vignoli	DF	2	0	22 March 1925	Italy	21 May 1925	England	
Rémy Vogel	DF	1	0	9 September 1987	Soviet Union	9 September 1987	Soviet Union	
Paul Voyeux	FW	1	0	20 April 1913	Luxembourg	20 April 1913	Luxembourg	
Roland Wagner	FW	1	1	10 October 1979	United States	10 October 1979	United States	
Marius Walter	FW	2	1	11 December 1949	Yugoslavia	4 June 1950	Belgium	
Michel Watteau	MF	1	0	26 November 1966	Luxembourg	26 November 1966	Luxembourg	
Raymond Wattine	MF	1	0	26 November 1966	Luxembourg	26 November 1966	Luxembourg	
Édouard Wawrzeniak	FW	1	0	10 November 1935	Sweden	10 November 1935	Sweden	
Edmond Weiskopf	FW	1	0	16 March 1939	Hungary	16 March 1939	Hungary	
Ulysse Wibaut	DF	1	0	22 October 1908	Denmark	22 October 1908	Denmark	
Charles Wilkes	DF	4	0	12 February 1905	Switzerland	12 April 1908	Belgium	
Mapou Yanga-Mbiwa	DF	4	0	15 August 2012	Uruguay	14 November 2014	Albania	
Jean-Louis Zanon	MF	1	0	5 October 1983	Spain	5 October 1983	Spain	
Mario Zatelli	FW	1	1	22 January 1939	Poland	22 January 1939	Poland	
Jonathan Zebina	DF	1	0	9 February 2005	Sweden	9 February 2005	Sweden	
Charles Zehren	DF	1	0	8 March 1936	Belgium	8 March 1936	Belgium	
Paul Zeiger	DF	1	0	21 April 1907	Belgium	21 April 1907	Belgium	
Émile Zermani	MF	1	0	27 October 1935	Switzerland	27 October 1935	Switzerland	
Simon Zimny	DF	1	0	9 October 1955	Switzerland	9 October 1955	Switzerland	
Mustapha Zitouni	DF	4	0	6 October 1957	Hungary	13 March 1958	Spain	
Victor Zvunka	DF	1	0	26 March 1975	Hungary	26 March 1975	Hungary	

== See also ==
- List of France international footballers
- List of France international footballers (5–19 caps)
- List of France international footballers born outside France
