= 1925 Coupe de France final =

- Event: 1924–25 Coupe de France
CASG Paris	Rouen
CASG Paris	Rouen
1	1
- After extra time
- Date: 26 April 1925
- Venue: Stade Olympique, Colombes
- Referee: Marcel Slawik
- Attendance: 20,000

Replay
CASG Paris	Rouen
3	2
- Date: 10 May 1925
- Venue: Stade Olympique, Colombes
- Referee: Marcel Slawik
- Attendance: 18,000

The 1925 Coupe de France final was a football match held at Stade Olympique, Colombes on 26 April and 10 May 1925, that saw CASG Paris defeat FC Rouen 4–2 on aggregate thanks to their victory 3–2 in the final replay.

== Match details ==
=== First match ===
26 April 1925

CASG Paris	1–1 (a.e.t.)	Rouen
Auger 70'		Boulanger 3'

Stade Olympique, Colombes
Attendance: 20,000
Referee: Marcel Slawik

GK	(France) Alphonse Jou
DF	(France) Pierre Liénert (c)
DF	(France) Gollet
DF	(France) Raoul Marion
DF	(France) Marcel Marquet
MF	(France) Georges Clugnet
MF	(France) Jean Barville
FW	(France) André Caillet
FW	Jaroslav Soika
FW	(France) Henri Tissot
FW	(France) Auger
Manager:
Assistant Referees: Fourth Official:

GK	William Barnes
DF	(France) Jules Rault
DF	(France) Jacques Canthelou
DF	(France) Charles Witty
DF	(France) André Hérubel
MF	(France) André Blaizot (c)
MF	(France) André Renault
FW	(France) André Burel
FW	(France) Marcel Boulanger
FW	(France) Alexandre Halotel
FW	(France) Félix Pozo
Manager:
?

=== Replay ===
10 May 1925

CASG Paris	3–2	Rouen
Soika 3'; Barville 15'; Liénert 58'		Boulanger 11', 20'

Stade Olympique, Colombes
Attendance: 18,000
Referee: Marcel Slawik

GK	(France) Alphonse Jou
DF	(France) Pierre Liénert (c)
DF	(France) Gollet
DF	(France) Raoul Marion
DF	(France) Marcel Marquet
MF	(France) Georges Clugnet
MF	(France) Jean Barville
FW	(France) André Caillet
FW	Jaroslav Soika
FW	(France) Henri Tissot
FW	(France) Auger
Manager:
Assistant Referees: Fourth Official:

GK	William Barnes
DF	(France) Jules Rault
DF	(France) Jacques Canthelou
DF	(France) Charles Witty
DF	(France) André Hérubel
MF	(France) André Blaizot (c)
MF	(France) André Renault
FW	(France) André Burel
FW	(France) Marcel Boulanger
FW	(France) Alexandre Halotel
FW	(France) Félix Pozo
Manager:
?

== See also ==
- 1924–25 Coupe de France
