= Dhur (disambiguation) =

Dhur is a town in the Bumthang District in central Bhutan. It may also refer to:

== Places ==
- Dhur River, a river in the Bumthang district in the northeast of Bhutan

== People ==
- Gunda Dhur (1909–1964), a tribal leader from village Nethanar in Jagdalpur tehsil
- Laurentius Dhur, original name of Pan Twardowski, a sorcerer in Polish folklore and literature
- Jacques Dhur, French footballer
