= Pleimelding =

Pleimelding is a French surname. Notable people with the surname include:

- Pierre Pleimelding (1952–2013), French footballer and manager, son of René
- René Pleimelding (1925–1998), French footballer and manager
