= Raoul Marion =

French footballer

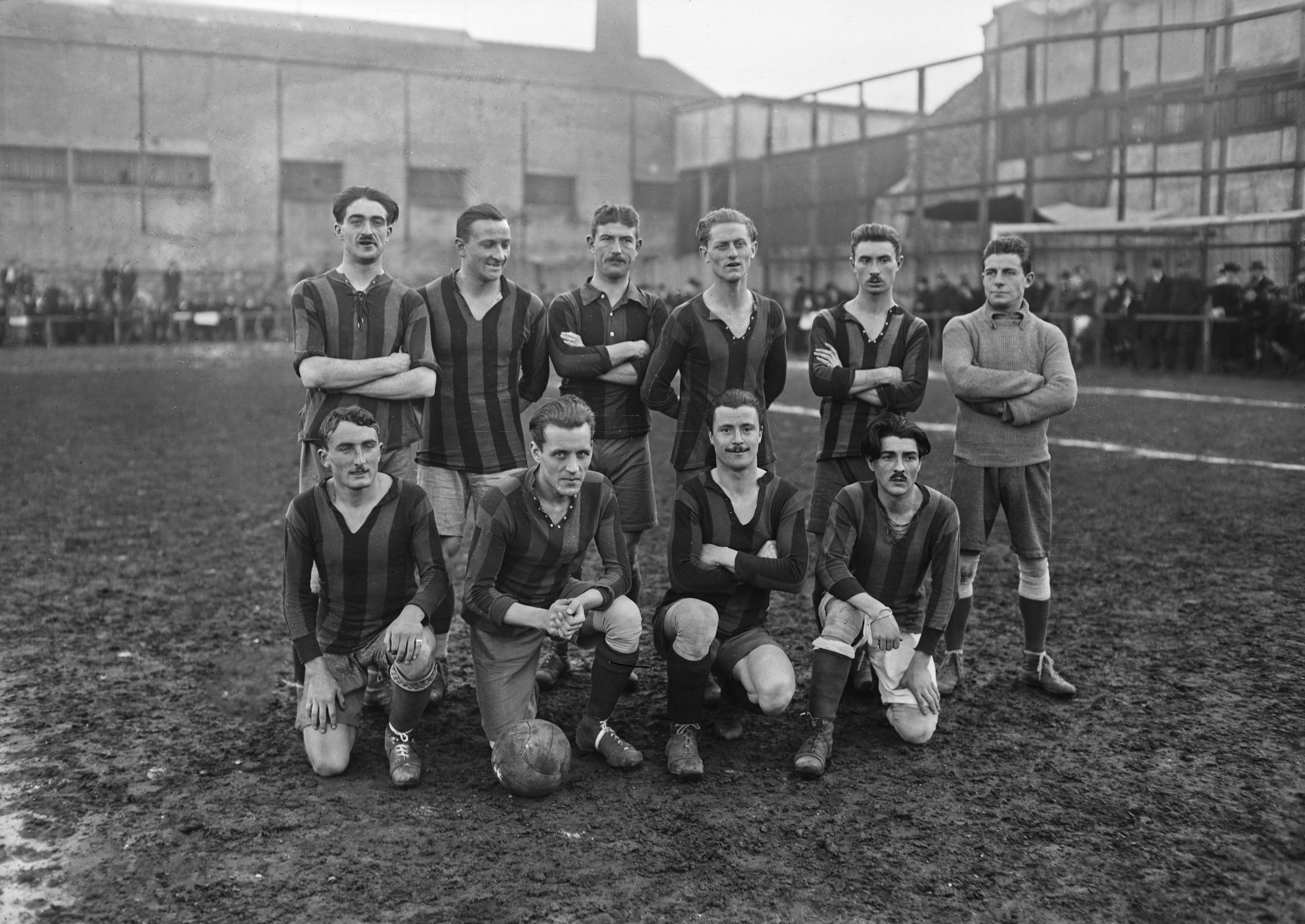
- Marion (standing, second from left) in 1920

Personal information
- Place of birth: France
- Position: Defender

Senior career*
Years	Team	Apps	(Gls)
1919–1923	Red Star		
1924–1925	CASG Paris		
- * Club domestic league appearances and goals

Raoul Marion was a French footballer who played as a defender for Red Star and CASG Paris in the 1920s.

== Playing career ==
Together with Pierre Chayriguès, Lucien Gamblin, and Paul Nicolas, Marion was a member of the Red Star team that won back-to-back Coupe de France titles in 1922 and 1923, starting in both finals as his side defeated Rennes (2–0) and Sète (4–2), respectively.

Together with Albert Caillet, Marcel Marquet, and Henri Tissot, he was a member of the CASG team that won the 1925 Coupe de France, beating Rouen 3–2 in the final. Marion is thus one of the few players who won three Coupe de France titles. The following day, the journalists of the French newspaper L'Auto (the future L'Équipe) described his performance as "more useful than brilliant, played better than in the previous match, but was still far from his form at the start of the current season".

== Honours ==
Red Star

- Coupe de France: 1920–21, 1921–22

CASG Paris

- Coupe de France: 1925
