= Raymond Gouin =

French footballer and sports leader

Personal information
- Full name: Raymond Maxime Gouin
- Date of birth: 23 October 1888
- Place of birth: Choisy-le-Roi, France
- Date of death: 28 October 1954 (aged 66)
- Place of death: Neuilly-sur-Seine, France
- Position: Midfielder

Senior career*
Years	Team	Apps	(Gls)
1908–1910	Jeanne d'Arc de Levallois		

International career
1909	France	2	(0)
3rd known president of the Courville FA
In office 1946–1954
Preceded by	Pierre Rousseau
Succeeded by	Roger Jourdain
- * Club domestic league appearances and goals

Raymond Maxime Gouin (23 October 1888 – 28 October 1954) was a French footballer who played as a midfielder for Jeanne d'Arc de Levallois and the French national team between 1908 and 1910. He later presided over the Courville Football Association for eight years, from 1946 until he died in 1954.

== Biography ==
Born in Choisy-le-Roi, on 23 October 1888, (Note: Some sources wrongly claim that he was born on 20 June 1888.) Gouin played his entire football career in the patronage clubs, most notably at the Jeanne d'Arc de Levallois between 1908 and 1910, one of the many Catholic clubs affiliated with the Gymnastic and Sports Federation of French Patronages (FGSPF). In 1904, the 16-year-old Gouin was the vice-president of a small patronage near the parish church of Saint-Ambroise.

His brother, Fernand, played in the attack, while Raymond always played in the halfback line and excelled particularly in defense, mainly thanks to his height of 1.76 meters, which is the equivalent of 1,86m today, thus being a dominant element in JA Levallois, of which he was the captain. However, the French press once described him as "possesses a certain finesse, but seems to lack composure". A complete amateur, football was never anything more than a leisure activity for him within his patronage. Due to being a player from the patronages, the USFSA selected him only as a member of the would-be France C squad that was originally listed to compete in the football tournament of the 1908 Olympic Games, but Gouin ended up not traveling to London because the USFSA decided to send only two instead of three teams.

On 9 May 1909, Gouin earned his first international cap in a friendly match against Belgium in Brussels, which ended in a 2–5 loss. Two weeks later, on 22 May, Gouin played his second and last match for France in a friendly against the England amateurs in Gentilly, and even though it ended in a resounding 0–11 loss, the local press cited him among the best French players in that match: "possessed a very sure composure and judgment, he held his place honorably, committing only one mistake, which cost him a goal"; Gouin hindered the goalkeeper Louis Tessier during an intervention.

However, Gouin's career was halted by an attack of tuberculosis which led to his being discharged from the military in 1916, but he eventually recovered. An accountant, he spent his entire professional career in banking. In 1946, Gouin replaced Pierre Rousseau as the president of the Courville Football Association, holding this position for eight years until he died in 1954. Under his presidency, the club played in the 1st departmental division from the 1945–46 until the 1951–52 season. His son, Jean-François Gouin, played for this club until he too died in 1967.

Gouin died in Neuilly-sur-Seine on 28 October 1954, at the age of 66.
