= Albert Courquin =

Albert Courquin may refer to:

- Albert Courquin (sport shooter) (1875–1953), French sport shooter
- Albert Courquin (footballer) (1898–1940), French footballer
