= Félix Pozo =

French footballer (1899–1967)

Personal information
- Full name: Félix Louis Gines Pozo
- Date of birth: 9 January 1899
- Place of birth: Sidi Bel Abbès, France
- Date of death: 28 May 1967 (aged 68)
- Place of death: France
- Position: Forward

Senior career*
Years	Team	Apps	(Gls)
?	Sidi-bel-Abbès		
1924–1926	Rouen		
1926–1927	Lyon OR		
1927	Castres		

International career
1925	France	1	(0)
- * Club domestic league appearances and goals

Félix Louis Gines Pozo (9 January 1899 – 28 May 1967) was a French footballer who played as a forward for Rouen and the French national team in the mid-1920s.

== Career ==
Born in Sidi Bel Abbès on 9 January 1899, Pozo began his football career playing for a modest hometown club, from which he joined Rouen in 1924, aged 25. Together with Jacques Canthelou, André Blaizot, and Marcel Boulanger, he was a member of the Rouen team that reached the 1925 Coupe de France final, which ended in a 3–2 loss to CASG Paris. The following day, the journalists of the French newspaper Le Miroir des sports stated that he was a "prey to events that tossed them around".

On 22 March 1925, a few weeks before the Cup final, the 26-year-old Pozo earned his first (and only) international cap in a friendly match against Italy in Turin, which ended in a resounding 0–7 loss. The following day, the journalists of L'Auto (currently known as L'Équipe), described his performance as "poor, hesitant, and uncertain; in his defense, he rarely had the ball".

== Death ==
Pozo died on 28 May 1967, at the age of 68.

== Honours ==
Rouen

- Coupe de France:
  - Runner-up: 1925
