= Courville =

Courville may refer to:

a surname:

- Cindy Courville (contemporary), U.S. Ambassador to the African Union
- Joachim Thibault de Courville (died 1581), French composer, singer, and musician of the Renaissance
- Larry Courville (born 1975), Canadian professional ice hockey player
- David Courville (born 1951), Native to Detroit Michigan, Mechanical Engineer.
- Vince Courville (born 1959), American football player

other:

- Courville, Marne, a commune in northeastern France
