= Dhur River =

Dhur
- Location of mouth

Location
- Country: Bhutan
- City: Bumthang

Physical characteristics
- Mouth
  - coordinates: 27.6108°N 90.6750°E
- Length: 25 km (16 mi)

Basin features
- Progression: Flows together with the Ramling into the Menchugang
- River system: Ganges

The Dhur is a river in the district (Dzongkhag) of Bumthang in the northeast of Bhutan. It is a headstream of the Menchugang.

The Dhur is about 25 km long, then it flows together with the Ramling forming the Menchugang. Several hot springs are found on its estuary.

The region around the Dhur is mostly a coniferous forest wherein grows Pinus wallichiana. The area is known for its remarkably rich flora. Many plants are endemic to the narrow river valley, such as Lilium sherriffiae, a rare type of lily; a rare type of pedicularis, called Pedicularis dhurensis, was named after the river.
