= Émile Lesmann =

French footballer (1891–1914)

Personal information
- Full name: Émile Maurice Lesmann
- Date of birth: 3 May 1891
- Place of birth: 10th arrondissement of Paris, France
- Date of death: 13 September 1914 (aged 23)
- Place of death: Loivre, France
- Position: Forward

Senior career*
Years	Team	Apps	(Gls)
1912–1914	JA Saint-Ouen		

International career
1912	France	1	(0)
- * Club domestic league appearances and goals

Émile Maurice Lesmann (3 May 1891 – 13 September 1914) was a French footballer who played as a forward for JA Saint-Ouen and the French national team in the early 1910s.

== Career ==
Born on 3 May 1891 in 10th arrondissement of Paris, Lesmann joined the ranks of JA Saint-Ouen around 1908, a small club affiliated with the FSAPF, being a member of the Saint-Ouen team that won back-to-back FSAF Championships in 1908 and 1909, thus qualifying the club for the Trophée de France in 1909, a national competition pitting the champions of each federation; Saint-Ouen won without playing a single match since their opponents failed to turn up. Shortly after, Saint-Ouen joined French Amateur Cycling Federation (FCAF).

On 22 January 1912, he scored a 4-goal haul against CA Boulonnais to help his side to a 7–2 victory, a performance that prompted the national team coach, Henri Chailloux, who was also the director of the FCAF, to select him to represent France just a few days later, on 28 January, as a last-minute replacement for the regular Maurice Olivier, who had withdrawn. He thus earned his first (and only) international cap in a friendly against Belgium at Stade Paris in Saint-Ouen, which ended in a 1–1 draw. The following day, the journalists of French newspaper L'Auto (currently known as L'Équipe) described him as the team's "weak point", stating that although he "doesn't lack qualities, such as shooting well, but he's not fast or flexible, he can't turn quickly, and he has a bad habit of playing too far from his target". Outside football, he worked as a mechanic-fitter.

== Death ==
During the outbreak of the First World War in July 1914, both he and his 45-year-old father were mobilized to the front, with the latter being wounded in August 1914 and discharged in 1915, while Émile was reported missing during the First Battle of the Marne in September 1914, and his remains were never found. His younger brother Emmanuel, who joined the JA Saint-Ouen in 1915, was also killed in the War in July 1918.

== Honours ==
JA Saint-Ouen

- FSAF Championships
  - Champions (2): 1908 and 1909
- Trophée de France
  - Champions (1): 1909

== Bibliography ==
- Perry, Raphaël (2021). Bleus éphémères [Ephemeral blues] (in French). Paris: Hugo Sport. p. 37. ISBN 978-2-7556-9244-0.
