= Émile Dusart =

French footballer (1896–1918)

Personal information
- Full name: Émile Louis François Dusart
- Date of birth: 2 August 1896
- Place of birth: Roubaix, France
- Date of death: 6 January 1918 (aged 21)
- Place of death: Sainte-Menehould, France
- Height: 1.66 m (5 ft 5 in)
- Position: Midfielder

Senior career*
Years	Team	Apps	(Gls)
1913–1914	RC Roubaix		

International career
1914	France	1	(0)
- * Club domestic league appearances and goals

Émile Louis François Dusart (2 August 1896 – 6 January 1918) was a French footballer who played as a midfielder for RC Roubaix and the French national team in the early 1910s.

== Early life ==
Émile Dusart was born on 2 August 1896 in Roubaix, as the eldest of four sons from Emile Joseph, plasterer-ceiling worker born in Belgium, but of French nationality. He grew up in Roubaix, where he attended all his schooling and passed his revision board.

== Playing career ==
Together with his brother André, he took out a license with his hometown club RC Roubaix in the early 1910s, but only became a regular in the club's first team during the 1913–14 season, aged 17, where he formed a great wing with Raymond Dubly. He made up for his frail build and small height of 1.66 meters with his technique, being selected by the Northern team to play a friendly against a selection of Normandy in April 1914. The following month, on 31 May 1914, the 17-year-old Dusart earned his first (and only) international cap for France in a friendly against Hungary at Budapest, which ended in a 5–1 loss. In doing so, he became the fourth-ever RC Roubaix players to represent the French national team, after Émile Sartorius, Maurice Vandendriessche, and Dubly.

== Death ==
When World War I broke out in July 1914, Dusart was still a few weeks shy of his 18th birthday, so he was only incorporated in April 1915, into Saint-Cyr. A second lieutenant of the 365th infantry regiment, he died on 6 January 1918, in an ambulance taking him to the Sainte-Menehould hospital after wounds received in combat on 2 January. The following month, in February, one of his brothers played for the Northern France selection in a friendly against a LFA selection. Despite being over 40 years old, his father also fought in World War I, but unlike his son, he survived it.

== Legacy ==
In the following year, in June 1919, his former club Roubaix held a mass in the Saint-Martin church in honor of the Roubaix members who died at the front, including Dusart. He was posthumously awarded the rank of Knight of the Legion of Honor.

Like so many other French internationals from the early 20th century, Dusart was the victim of mistakes by historians, being initially confused with a certain Emile Désiré Dusart, born in Ardennes on 3 September 1892, and who died on 13 March 1919, an error that persisted until the 21st century,
