= Albert Polge =

French footballer (born 1909)

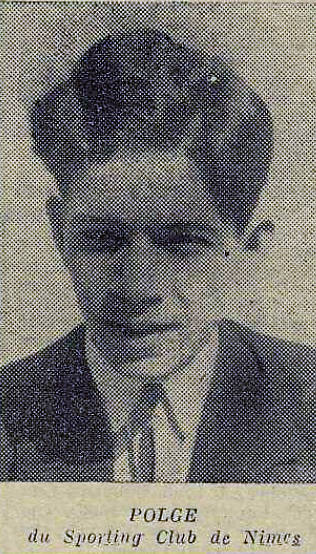
- Polge around 1930-1931

Personal information
- Date of birth: 29 November 1909
- Place of birth: Hòn Gai, French Indochina
- Date of death: 22 April 1982 (aged 72)
- Place of death: Avignon, France
- Height: 1.62 m (5 ft 4 in)
- Position: Winger

Senior career*
Years	Team	Apps	(Gls)
1927–1929	Aix-en-Provence		
1929–1934	SC Nîmes		
1934–1936	Saint-Étienne	58	(21)
1936–1938	Nîmes Olympique		
1938–1939	US Métro		
1939–1940	RC Paris		
1940–1941	Nîmes Olympique		
1942–1943	Avignon		

International career
1933	France B	4	(0)
1933–1934	France	3	(0)
1938	France Amateur	1	(0)
- * Club domestic league appearances and goals

Albert Polge (29 November 1909 - 22 April 1982) was a former footballer who played as a winger. Born in French Indochina, he was a France international.

== Early life ==
Polge was born to a French father and Annamese mother. At the age of 10, his mother died, which lead him to move to France, in Gard with his paternal grandparents. He joined the School of Arts and Crafts in Aix-en-Provence. He graduated as an engineer.

== Career ==
Polge spent most of his football career playing for Nîmes based teams: SC Nîmes and Nîmes Olympique. In the 1931–32 season, he scored 21 goals after 17 games for SC Nîmes. Polge mainly operated as a left-winger. The newspaper Le Sud described that “despite his small stature, Polge, who is a great player and commands the admiration of athletes”. Between 1934 and 1936, Polge played for AS Saint-Étienne.

Polge appeared three times with France national team between 1933 and 1934.

== Personal life ==
Polge and his wife Marcelle, née Battut (1907-1944) were accused of collaboration following the Liberation of Nîmes in 1944. While Polge avoided a death penalty, his wife was found guilty, which resulted in her execution in public. He remarried in 1950 in Avignon and divorced in 1963. An archived newspaper piece from France Football later shows that he died in April 1982.
