= François Mercier =

French footballer (1916–1996)

Personal information
- Full name: Drian François Étienne Mercier
- Date of birth: 19 July 1916
- Place of birth: Palavas-les-Flots, Hérault, France
- Date of death: 17 June 1996 (aged 79)
- Place of death: 6th arrondissement of Marseille, France
- Height: 1.82 m (6 ft 0 in)
- Position: Midfielder

Senior career*
Years	Team	Apps	(Gls)
- Palavas
?–1936	Arles		
1936–1945	Sète		
1945–1946	Red Star		

International career
1942	France	1	(0)
- * Club domestic league appearances and goals

Drian François Étienne Mercier (19 July 1916 – 17 June 1996) was a French footballer who played as a midfielder for Sète and the France national team between 1936 and 1945.

== Career ==
Born in the Hérault town of Palavas-les-Flots on 19 July 1916, Mercier began his football career at Sète in 1936, with whom he played for nine years, until 1945. In his first two and a half seasons at Sète, he played a total of 74 matches in Ligue 1, helping his side win the 1938–39 French Division 1, which was the last season before the outbreak of the First World War. During the conflict, Sète played in the interregional French league, winning the 1941–42 edition, and reaching the final of the 1941–42 Coupe de France, which ended in a 2–0 loss to his future club Red Star. After leaving Sète in 1945, he joined Red Star, where he stayed for only a single season, retiring in 1946, aged 30.

On 15 March 1942, the 25-year-old Mercier earned his first (and only) international cap for France in a friendly match against Spain at Seville. He played at full-back alongside Jules Vandooren, and even though they "stopped several dangerous situations" created by Spain's dominant attack, they were still outplayed by Epi and Mundo in an eventual 4–0 loss, with Mercier being dribbled by Mundo for Spain's second. The next day, journalists of the French newspaper L'Auto (the future L'Équipe) stated that Mercier "disappointed even those who had high hopes for his physical qualities, as he was never in place, made numerous blunders, and showed a complete lack of understanding". He was the fourth and last Mercier to play for France, which remains the most recurring surname in the national team; the previous three were Daniel (1910), Albert (1919), and Robert (1931).

== Death ==
Mercier died in the 6th arrondissement of Marseille on 17 June 1996, at the age of 79.

== Honours ==
FC Sète 34

- Ligue 1:
  - Champions (1): 1938–39 and 1941–42
- Coupe de France:
  - Runner-up (1): 1942
