= Federation of Athletic Societies of France =

- Sport: List: Association football; Athletics
- Jurisdiction: France
- Abbreviation: FSAF
- Founded: 1897
- Headquarters: Paris
- Replaced: List: FFF (Football); FAF (Athletics)
- Closure date: 1920s; 0 days' time

The Federation of Athletic Societies of France (French: Fédération des sociétés athlétiques de France, FSAF) is a French sports federation. In 1906, it changed its name to Federation of Professional Athletic Societies of France (FSAPF), and this modification marked the end of the "open war" waged against the USFSA, which from then onwards, officially delegated the management of professional sport in France to the FSAPF. The federation was again named FSAF after the war.

== FSAF Football Championship ==
FSAF French Football Championship
- Founded: 1897
- Abolished: 1924; 101 years ago
- Region: Gironde and Paris
- Number of teams: 4
- Last champions: UA Bordelaise (1922)
- Most successful club(s): Union Athlétique Batignollaise (4 titles)

The FSAF French Football Championship is a French football competition organized by the Federation of Athletic Societies of France (FSAF). Organized into regional championships (Paris with 3 series, North, South-East, and South-West), the winners met to compete for the title of Champion of France. It was held every year from 1897 until the outbreak of the First World War in 1914, and then it had two more editions in 1922 and 1924.

=== History ===
In 1894, the USFSA created a French Football Championship reserved for amateurs, because this federation was opposed to professionalism, particularly because of the transfers and bets generated by the professionalization of football in England from 1885 onwards. So the FSAF then created a football championship for professionals, which was denigrated by the leaders of French sport, but nevertheless enjoyed remarkable popular success in Paris and benefited from significant coverage in the press. Despite its "professional" name, the players of this federation did not make a living from football and did not make it their profession: they did, however, receive some modest bonuses, which was prohibited in other federations and set the FSAF apart.

The FSAF managed other competitions such as the Challenge Henri Jaeggé, the Challenge Compan, the Coupe Juniors (for newly formed young teams), the Coupe Anthoine (organized by the UA Batignollaise) or the Challenge Klein (organized by the AS Lilloise). In 1904, 77 teams participated in the various events managed by the FSAF. In 1905, the entry fee for the 1st Series Paris Championship was 25 francs, with the winner receiving 500 francs, a diploma, and the title of Paris Champion, while the runner-up received 200 francs and the third 100 francs. In 1907, FSAF became a member of the French Interfederal Committee and the winner of the FSAF Football Championship competed for the Trophée de France.

After the war ended, two more editions were held, the first in 1922, in which the final took place in Aubervilliers on 19 March, with UA Bordelaise beating AC Fiersois. On 13 April 1924, the semifinals were contested between UA Bordelaise and AS Montreuilloise; and JS Lilloise and CA de la Marne, but the results and the winner remain unknown.

== Titles ==
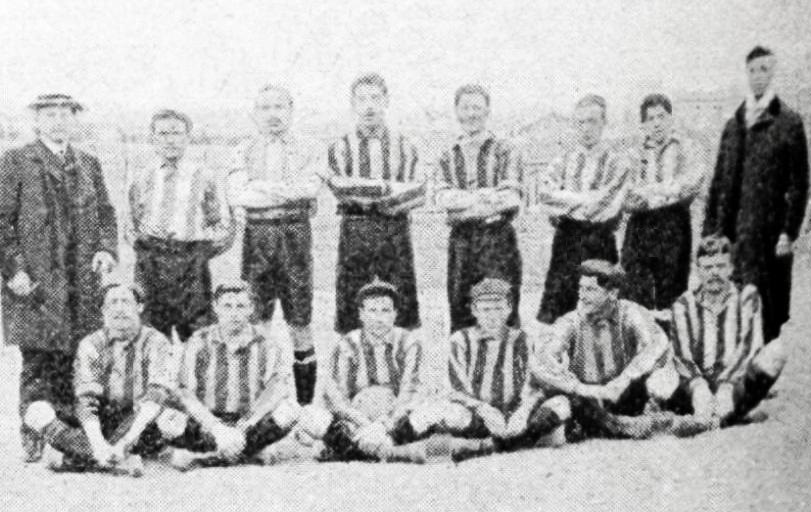
Union Athlétique Batignollaise in April 1904

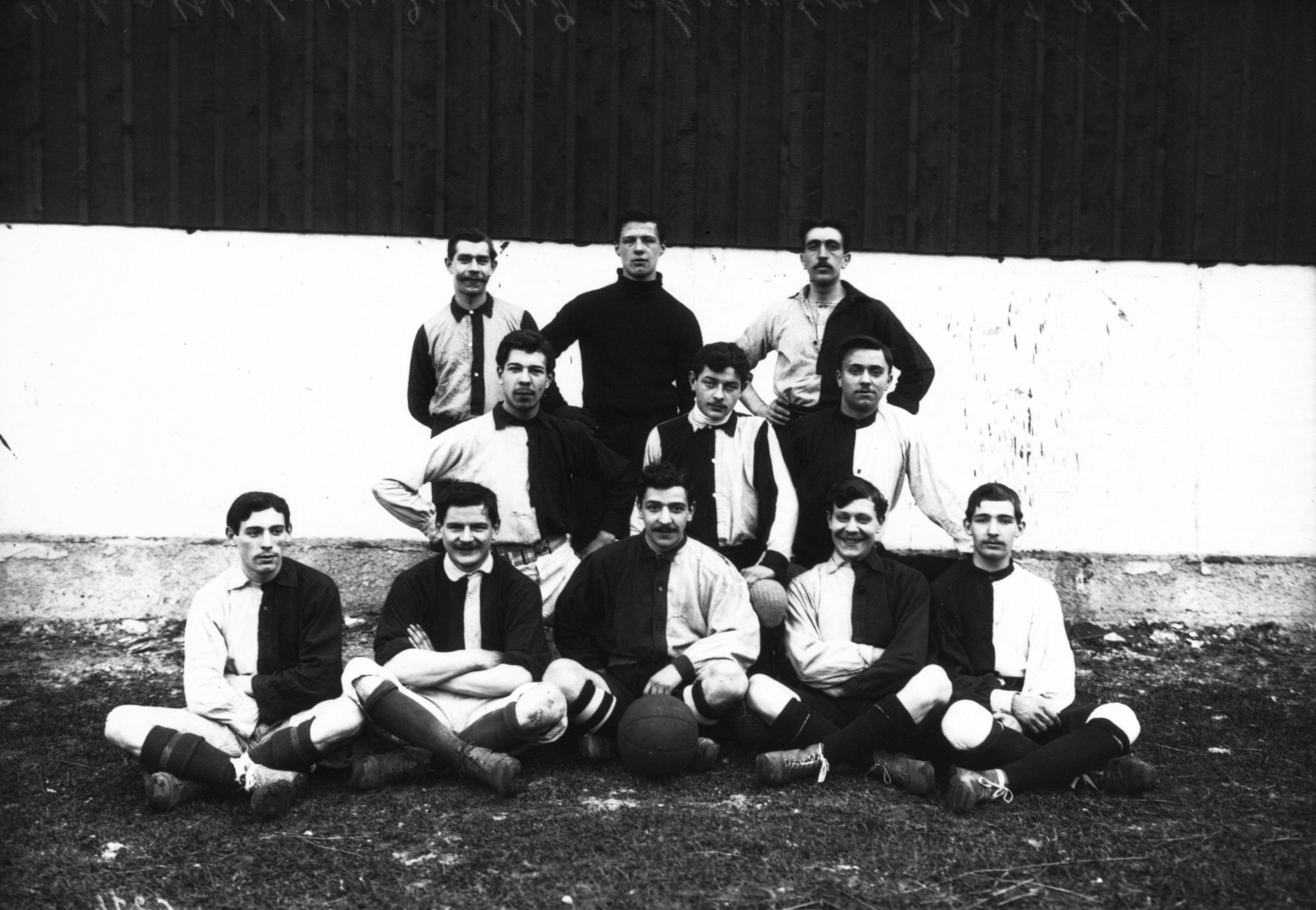
The Southern Athletic Club in 1907

| Edition | Winners | Runner-up | Venue |
|---|---|---|---|
| 1897 | Union des Sports de France | | |
| 1898 | Union des Sports de France (2) | | |
| 1899 | Union des Sports de France (3) | | |
| 1900 | Club Athlétique Parisien | | |
| 1901 | Club Athlétique Parisien (2) | | |
| 1902 | Union Athlétique Batignollaise | | |
| 1903 | Union Athlétique Batignollaise (2) | | |
| 1904 | Union Athlétique Batignollaise (3) | | |
| 1905 | Union Athlétique Batignollaise (4) | | |
| 1906 | Club Athlétique du Sud | | |
| 1907 | Club Athlétique du Sud (2) | FC Paris | Levallois-Perret |
| 1908 | Jeunesse athlétique de Saint-Ouen | | Roubaix |
| 1909 | Jeunesse athlétique de Saint-Ouen (2) | FC des Sports de Roubaix | Saint-Ouen |
| 1914 | Union Athlétique du XIVe | UA Dionysienne | Saint-Ouen |
| 1922 | UA Bordelaise | AC Fiersois | Aubervilliers |
