= René Kenner =

French footballer (1906–1970)

Personal information
- Full name: René Maurice Kenner
- Date of birth: 21 April 1906
- Place of birth: Choisy-le-Roi, France
- Date of death: 4 January 1970 (aged 63)
- Place of death: Nice, France
- Position: Midfielder

Senior career*
Years	Team	Apps	(Gls)
1926–1928	CA Vitry		
1928–1929	Club Français		
1929–1933	Sochaux		
1935–1939	Valentigney		

International career
1928	France	1	(0)
- * Club domestic league appearances and goals

René Maurice Kenner (21 April 1906 – 4 January 1970) was a French footballer who played as a midfielder for Sochaux in the early 1930s.

== Career ==
Born in the Val-de-Marne town of Choisy-le-Roi on 21 April 1906, Kenner began his career at CA Vitry in 1926, aged 20. Two years later, on 15 April 1928, the 21-year-old Kenner earned his first (and only) international cap for France in a friendly match against Belgium at Colombes, which ended in a 3–2 loss. The following day, he was harshly criticized by the local press, with the journalists of Le Journal stating that he, "undoubtedly intimidated, played well below his usual appreciable level", while those of L'Auto (the forerunner of L'Équipe) stated that he "was perhaps the worst player on our team", describing him as "too slow, his defense is awful, and it's obvious that yesterday he was completely out of shape, with his passes almost always going to opposing players", being "regularly beaten by Pierre Braine", and even misusing free-kicks.

Kenner stayed at Vitry for two years, from 1926 until 1928, when he went to Club Français, where he played one season. The following year, he left Polytechnique for an engineering job at the design office of SA Peugeot, whose owner, Jean-Pierre Peugeot, recruited him for FC Sochaux, which had just been completely reorganized. On 25 August 1929, he was listed in the Sochaux professional squad that faced AS Montbéliard in the opening match of the season. On 18 May 1930, he started in the final of the Turckheim challenge, helping his side to a 5–0 victory over Beaucourt. In his first season at the club, he scored 12 goals in 31 matches. Two years later, he was a member of the Sochaux team that participated in the inaugural edition of the French professional championship, starting in the opening match on 11 September 1932, which ended in a 3–0 los to CA Paris.

Having left Sochaux in 1933, Kenner signed for Valentigney in 1935, with whom he played for four years, until 1939, when he retired. He later became vice-president of the Ligue de Bourgogne de football.

== Death ==
Kenner died in Nice on 4 January 1970, at the age of 63.

== Honours ==
FC Sochaux

- Coupe Sochaux
  - Champions: 1931
