= Roland Schmitt (French footballer) =

French footballer

Personal information
- Date of birth: 5 June 1912
- Place of birth: Eaubonne
- Date of death: 20 December 1974 (aged 62)
- Height: 1.70 m (5 ft 7 in)
- Position: Defensive midfielder

Senior career*
Years	Team	Apps	(Gls)
1934–1936	Racing Paris		
1936–1939	FC Sète		
1939–1943	Toulouse FC		
1943–1944	EF Lyon-Lyonnais		
1944–1945	Toulouse FC		
1945–1947	Lyon OU		

International career
1939–1942	France	2	(0)
- * Club domestic league appearances and goals

Roland Schmitt (5 June 1912 – 20 December 1954) was a French football midfielder.
