= André Allègre =

French footballer and naval architect (1895–1966)

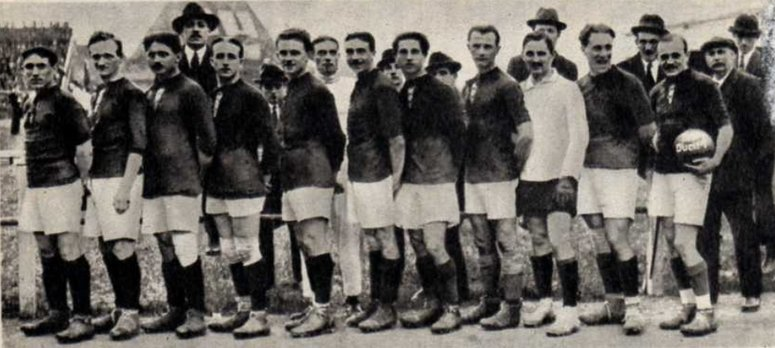
- Allègre (first, from the left) in 1920

Personal information
- Full name: André Marcel Louis Allègre
- Date of birth: 10 May 1895
- Place of birth: Saint-Maurice, Val-de-Marne, France
- Date of death: 2 November 1966 (aged 71)
- Place of death: Vigneux-sur-Seine, France
- Position: Midfielder

Senior career*
Years	Team	Apps	(Gls)
1910–1913	CA Paris		
1913–1915	UA Intergadzarique		
1918–1920	CA Paris		

International career
1914	France	1	(0)
- * Club domestic league appearances and goals

André Marcel Louis Allègre (10 May 1895 – 2 November 1966) was a French footballer who played as a midfielder for CA Paris and the French national team in the 1910s. After retiring, he became a naval architect.

== Biography ==
André Allègre was born on 10 May 1895 in Saint-Maurice, Val-de-Marne. (Note: Some sources wrongly claim that he was born on 30 December 1890.) He began his career playing for CA Paris from 1910 to 1913, and then for UA Intergadzarique from 1913 to 1915, a club formed by Gadzarts, the nickname given to the students of Arts et Métiers ParisTech, a prestigious university from which he graduated, hence later becoming a naval architect. There, he was considered "a young prodigy", and played alongside future international Michel Dupoix.

On 31 May 1914, the 19-year-old Allègre earned his first (and only) international cap for France in a friendly match against Hungary at Budapest, which ended in a 1–5 loss.

Together with Marcel Vanco, Louis Mesnier, and Henri Bard, Allègre was a member of the CA Paris team that won the Coupe de France in 1920, starting in the semifinals against VGA Médoc on 11 April (2–1), and then started in the final on 9 May, which ended in a 2–1 win over Le Havre.

== Later life and death ==
After World War I, Allègre became a naval architect. He died in Vigneux-sur-Seine on 2 November 1966, at the age of 61.

== Honours ==
CA Paris

- Coupe de France: 1919–20

== Bibliography ==
- Perry, Raphaël (2021). Bleus éphémères [Ephemeral blues] (in French). Paris: Hugo Sport. p. 53. ISBN 978-2-7556-9244-0.
