= Pierre Lienert =

French footballer (1898–1926)

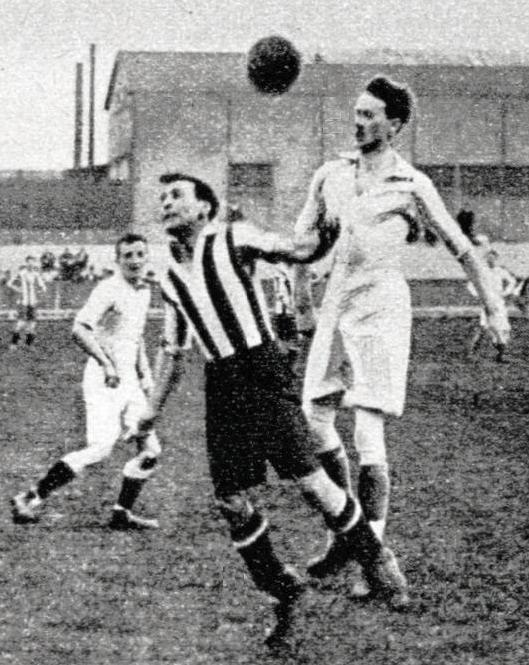
- Lienert (right) dominates Juste Brouzes (1923)

Personal information
- Full name: Jean Pierre Lienert
- Date of birth: 7 October 1898
- Place of birth: Épinal, France
- Date of death: 25 April 1926 (aged 27)
- Place of death: Asnières-sur-Seine, France
- Position: Defender

Senior career*
Years	Team	Apps	(Gls)
1921–1925	CASG Paris		

International career
1925	France	1	(0)
- * Club domestic league appearances and goals

Jean Pierre Lienert (7 October 1898 – 25 April 1926) was a French footballer who played as a defender for CASG Paris and the French national team in the early 1920s.

== Playing career ==
Born in the Vosges town of Épinal on 7 October 1898, Lienert began playing for CASG Paris in the early 1920s, eventually established himself as the team's captain in 1925. Together with Albert Caillet, Marcel Marquet, and Henri Tissot, Lienert was a member of the CASG team that won the 1925 Coupe de France, beating Rouen 3–2 in the final. The following day, the journalists of the French newspaper L'Auto (the future L'Équipe) stated that he "held his position cautiously; he positioned himself well, but his clearance was weak".

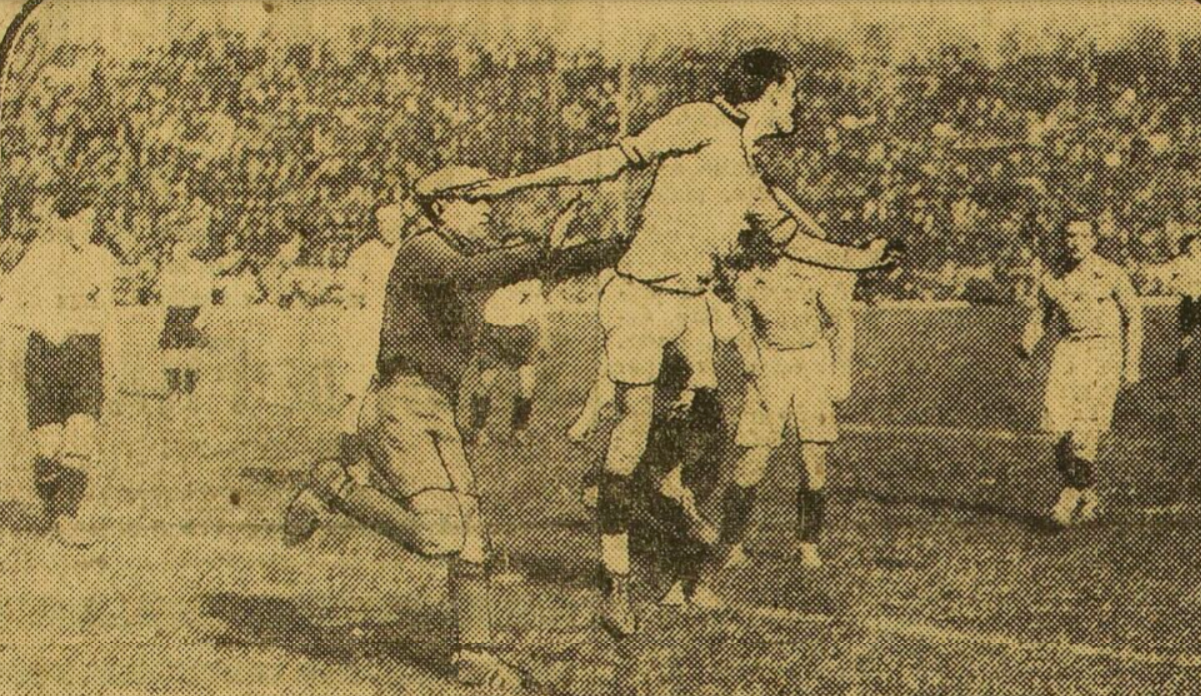
Pierre Lienert heading clear after a corner.

On 19 April 1925, three weeks before the Cup final, the 26-year-old Lienert earned his first (and only) international cap in a friendly match against Austria in Paris, which ended in 0–4 loss.

== Death ==
Lienert died in Asnières-sur-Seine on 25 April 1926, at the age of 27.

== Honours ==
CASG Paris

- Coupe de France:
  - Champions (1): 1925
