= André Hurtevent =

French footballer (1906–1988)

Personal information
- Date of birth: 28 November 1906
- Place of birth: Abbeville, France
- Date of death: 21 September 1988 (aged 81)
- Place of death: Saint-Valery-sur-Somme, France
- Position: Forward

Senior career*
Years	Team	Apps	(Gls)
1926–1928	Abbeville		
1928–1932	Amiens		
1932–1941	Abbeville		

International career
1927	France	1	(0)

Managerial career
- 1940–1941: Abbeville
- 1961–1964: Abbeville
- * Club domestic league appearances and goals

André Hurtevent (28 November 1906 – 21 September 1988) was a French footballer who played as a forward for Abbeville and the French national team in the late 1920s.

== Early life ==
Born on 28 November 1906 in the Somme town of Abbeville, Hurtevent began playing football during the First World War, when he was still a boy, featuring for the "Royal Engeners" team in matches held on the square of the Saint-Sépulcre church, where several English people were being sheltered. He soon developed into a skilled right winger, earning the nickname Hurt from the English.

== Career ==
After a promising start with a local team, Hurtevent began playing for the youth ranks of SC Abbeville, eventually helping the senior team achieve back-to-back promotions to the second and first divisions, at the age of 16. Two years later, in 1925, the 18-year-old Hurtevent earned his first selection in a Nord-Uruguay match, where he remained an unused substitute. His performances at Abbeville were noticed by former international Lucien Gamblin, who helped him get his first (and only) international cap for France in a friendly match against Portugal in Lisbon on 14 March 1927, helping his side to a 4–0 victory. Having played an excellent game, the journalists of the local press named him the team's best player. Later that year, he was selected for another friendly, this time against Hungary on 12 June, but he was unable to play because of a serious knee injury that he sustained while representing the French military team against Belgium at the Stade Pershing.

Once he recovered, Hurtevent led the 110th Regiment to the final of the French Military Championship, which ended in an extra-time loss to the 31st Aviation Regiment, which had eight full internationals. When he completed his mandatory military service, he returned to Abbeville, but was asked to join Amiens, with whom he played for four years, until 1932, when he once again returned to Abbeville.

In the early 1930s, his work as a sculptor forced Hurtevent to briefly live in Paris, where he played for Stade Français, then for Pathé-Natan, where he was employed. During his last years at Abbeville, he was often the best player on the pitch, being noted for his camaraderie and sportsmanship, given that he never protested when the team was relegated to the first B league. After retiring, Hurtevent remained linked to Abbeville, now as a coach, which he oversaw on two occasions, first in the 1940–41 season, and again from 1961 until 1964.

In addition to sculpting, Hurtevent also worked as a teacher of physical education, dance, fencing, and boxing.

== Death ==
Hurtevent died in Saint-Valery-sur-Somme on 21 September 1988, at the age of 81.
