= Albert Caillet =

French footballer (1901–1925)

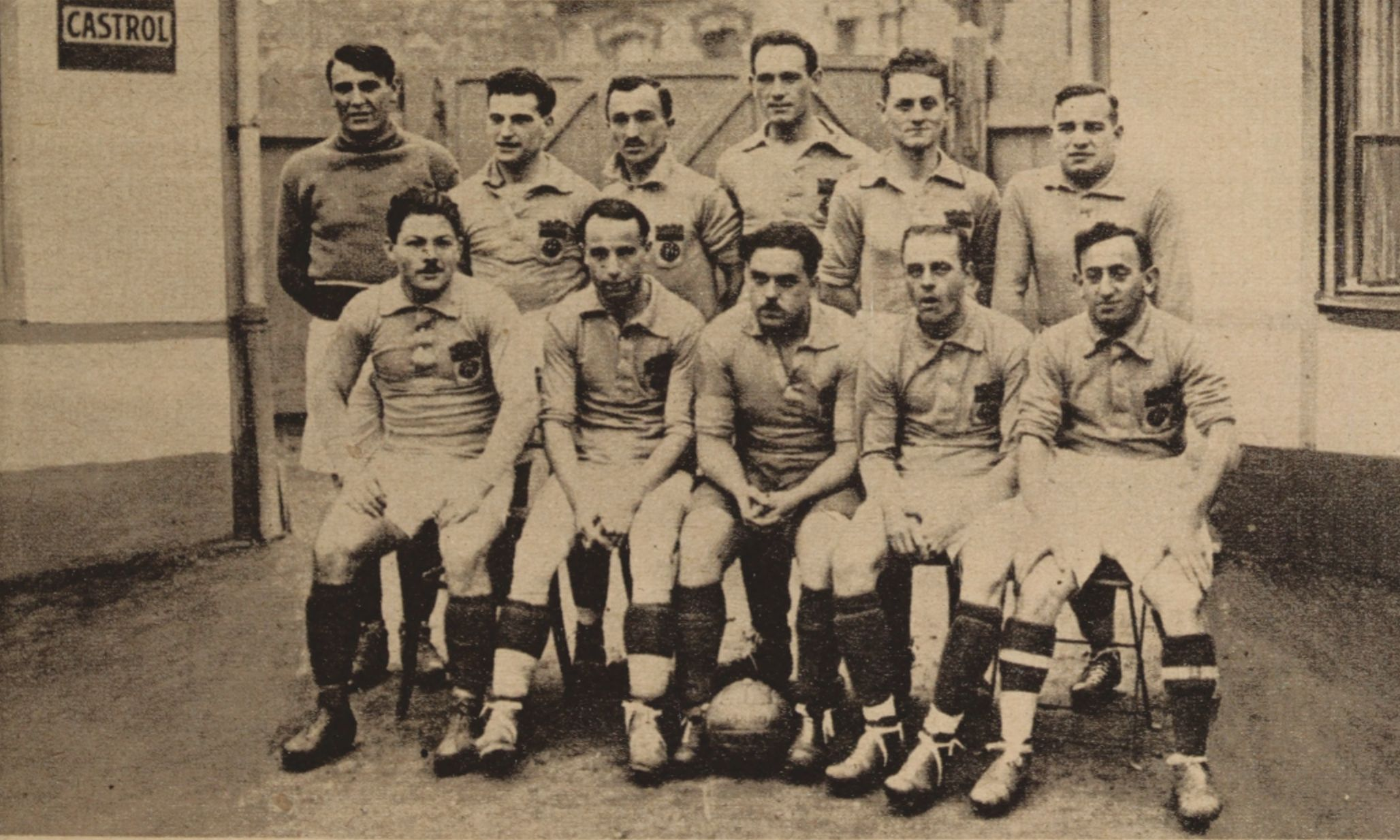
- Caillet (front row, second from the left) with the Paris team victorious over the London team in 1923.

Personal information
- Full name: Albert Lucien Emile Caillet
- Date of birth: 4 December 1901
- Place of birth: 14th arrondissement of Paris, France
- Date of death: 13 August 1925 (aged 23)
- Place of death: Eaubonne, France
- Position: Midfielder

Senior career*
Years	Team	Apps	(Gls)
1918–1925	CASG Paris		

International career
1923	France	1	(0)
1923	Paris	1	(0)
- * Club domestic league appearances and goals

Albert Lucien Emile Caillet (4 December 1901 – 13 August 1925) was a French footballer who played as a midfielder for CASG Paris and the French national team in the early 1920s.

== Club career ==
Born in the 14th arrondissement of Paris on 4 December 1901, Caillet began playing football in the streets of the capital during the First World War, and once the conflict was over in 1918, the 17-year-old Caillet joined CASG Paris, where he stayed his entire career. On 2 April 1923, he earned his first (and only) international cap in a friendly match against the Netherlands in Amsterdam, which ended in a resounding 8–1 loss.

A few months later, on 1 November, he started for the Paris football team in its annual match against London League, featuring alongside the likes of Albert Courquin and Aimé Durbec. After this match, the local press stated that he "did some good things, but he seemed disoriented" since he was not "always where he should have been, and his hesitation to shoot was very detrimental to him".

Together with Pierre Liénert, Marcel Marquet, and Henri Tissot, Caillet was a member of the CASG team that won the 1925 Coupe de France, beating Rouen 3–2 in the final on 10 May 1925.

== Death ==
On 13 August 1925, just three months after the Coupe de France victory, the 23-year-old Caillet committed suicide in Eaubonne following the death of his fiancé. He had begun his mandatory military service in 1921, with the matricular registration number 6452.

== Legacy ==
Like many French internationals from the start of the 20th century, Caillet was the victim of mistakes by historians, being initially given the first name André, born in Pantin, an error that persisted until the 21st century, even appearing in the Equipe de France de Football, l'Intégrale des 497 rencontres ("French Football Team, All 497 Matches"), a book published by the FFF in 1991.

== Honours ==
CASG Paris

- Coupe de France:
  - Champions (1): 1925
