= Pierre Rousseau =

French essayist, epistemologist, astronomer and journalist

- Born: Pierre Jean-Baptiste Rousseau; 11 February 1905; Montbazon, France
- Died: 1983 (aged 77–78); Limeil-Brévannes, France
- Occupations: Essayist, epistemologist, astronomer, journalist

Pierre Jean-Baptiste Rousseau (11 February 1905 – 1983) was a French essayist, epistemologist, astronomer and journalist who authored numerous popular science essays and articles. He helped promote hard science to the general public and advocated the development of fundamental scientific research in a "post-war disenchantment".

== Biography ==
=== Early years ===
The son of clerk assistant Jean-Baptiste Rousseau and Marie Renée Lefort, he was the oldest of three brothers. One of his brothers, René, died at the Battle of France and the other, Jean, volunteered as an airborne radio-operator in the Free French Forces before pursuing a career at Air France.

Rousseau was drawn to science as a child through reading a popular astronomy collection published by Théophile Moreux. A gifted student in mathematics who received departmental and national bursaries in 1918 and 1920, Rousseau built his first telescope at the age of 13 and published his first scientific paper at 17.

With the help of Jean Becquerel, he was appointed Assistant Boarding Master at the Montargis middle school in 1923. Despite his repeated attempts to be transferred to a city with a university in order to prepare his degree, Rousseau lived for several years between Fontainebleau, Blois and Vendôme.

After obtaining his first degree in General Mathematics in 1929, he was transferred to Paris at the Lycée Charlemagne and briefly to the Lycée Janson-de-Sailly before becoming assistant teacher at the Lycée Buffon. Rousseau then fulfilled his military obligation in 1931.

Certified in Advanced Astronomy in March 1932, he obtained two distinct degrees in philosophy (Psychology, Morals and Sociology) and in Mathematics and Physics in 1935.

=== First publications ===
While working toward his university degrees, Rousseau covered scientific news in several newspapers. His most significant articles were published in La Nature, a popular science magazine founded in 1873 by Gaston Tissandier. His experience as a popular writer fed his future works. His scientific columns earned him a significant number of letters from his readers.

=== Astronomy ===
When asked to transfer to the Lycée Félix Faure of Beauvaisin 1935, Rousseau resigned from the Éducation Nationale without hesitation to join the Meudon Observatory as "Astronome Stagiaire au Service du Méridien" ("Trainee Astronomer at the Meridian Study"). At the time, French astronomy was under-developed compared to other western nations at the time (namely British, North American and Russian). The total staff of astronomers barely reached 150 in France, and the modernization project of the observatory, set in the Château de Meudon had just started; feeders and racks of the stables where the laboratories were installed had not yet been removed.

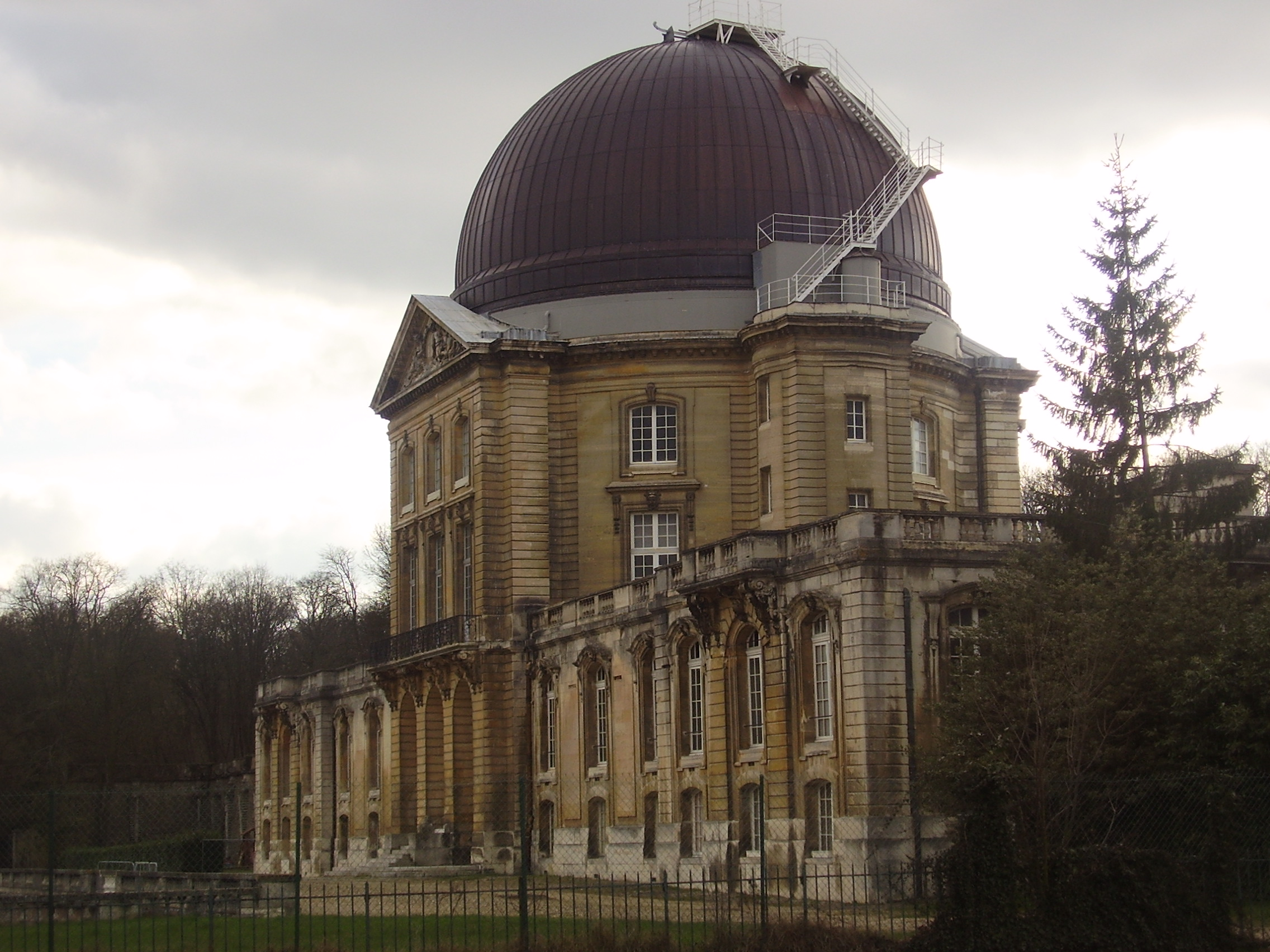
Dome of the Meudon Observatory installed on top of the former Château de Meudon.

Audouin Dollfus, one of the most eminent astronomer in France, son of Charles Dollfus (creator of the Musée de l'Air and Honorary Astronomer at the Paris Observatory), remembers Pierre Rousseau as a young astronomer:

"Before the War, we were only a fistful. Pierre Rousseau was a modest person, almost too modest, deep, an excellent writer and an excellent popularizer. His books on astronomy are admirable! I read them avidly. To illustrate his Mars, Mysterious Earth, I think he obtained the images from the telescope of Antoniadi himself."

In 1939, Rousseau was enlisted and stationed in an artillery battery unit in Lorraine . He writes in Le monde des étoiles (The World of Stars - 1950); "Combien de fois l’auteur de ce livre ne l’a-t-il pas contemplé [Jupiter.]… pendant la dernière guerre, avec la modeste « binoculaire » de sa batterie ?" (How many times the author of this book contemplated, during the last war, [Jupiter] with his modest binoculars ?).

His first book on astronomy (L'Exploration du Ciel - Sky Exploration) was published the same year, at 8.0000 copies. It shows, early on, Rousseau's distinctive love for anecdotes and a particular care to underline the work of scientists and the importance of the history of science.

While focusing particularly on astronomy and related sciences, he was also interested in epistemology, astronautics, geology, nuclear physics, and electricity. His last book, L'avenir de la Terre (The Future of Earth) was published in 1977 by Nouvelles Éditions Latines.

=== Later life ===
Through the 1950s and 1960s, Rousseau continued his work as a science journalist and popular science writer. His works were translated in several languages and have inspired some of his readers to become astronomers. With his multiple experiences in various scientific domains and the history of science, Rousseau presented himself as a witness of the evolution of scientific progress in the eyes of the public opinion. After the publication of his last essay, The Future Earth, he suffered a stroke at the end of the 1970s. Rousseau then progressively lost his physical and intellectual capacities until his death.

== Works ==
This list includes only the works published in France and a few foreign publications. The list and collection of his work for newspapers and magazines (La Revue de Paris, Historia, Nature, L’œuvre, Marianne, Le Petit Parisien, La Petite Gironde, Science et Vie) are difficult to obtain in its integrity, and are therefore not listed here.

With the exception of Que sais-je?, the works of Rousseau are not available in public libraries.

=== French editions ===
- 1939: Exploration du ciel, Hachette
- 1941: Mars, Terre mystérieuse, Hachette
- 1941: Pour comprendre l’astrophysique, Librairie Douin et Cie (Préface de l’Abbé Moreux)
- 1941: De l’atome à l’étoile, Que sais-je ? 2, PUF
- 1941: L’astronomie sans télescope, Que sais-je ? 13, PUF
- 1942: La Lumière, Que sais-je ? 48, PUF
- 1942: Histoire de la vitesse, Que sais-je ? 88, PUF
- 1943: Notre amie, la Lune, Hachette
- 1945: Histoire de la Science, Fayard
- 1946: La conquête de la science, Fayard
- 1947: La Terre, ma patrie, Fayard
- 1948: Histoire de l’atome, Fayard
- 1949: Histoire de la Terre. I, L’homme avant l’histoire and Histoire de la Terre. II, Jeunesse de la Terre NEL (2 tomes)
- 1950: L’énergie, Fayard
- 1950: Jean-François, astronome, Hachette
- 1950: Le monde des étoiles, Hachette
- 1952: Notre soleil, Hachette
- 1951: Découverte du ciel - L’Homme devant les étoiles. Tomme 1, NEL
- 1952: Jean-François, électricien, Hachette
- 1952: L’astronomie nouvelle, Fayard
- 1953: Au cœur de la Terre, Hachette
- 1954: La science au XXème siècle, Hachette
- 1955: Exploration du ciel, Hachette
- 1955: Glaciers et torrents - Energie et lumière, Hachette
- 1956: A la conquête des étoiles, Hachette
- 1956: Histoire des techniques et des inventions, Prix Maujean 1957 (Académie française)
- 1957: Le monde des étoiles, Hachette
- 1957: Satellites artificiels, Hachette
- 1959: L’astronomie, Livre de poche|Livre de Poche (Librairie générale française)
- 1959: Histoire de l’avenir, Hachette, Prix Nautilus 1960
- 1961: Ces inconnus ont fait le siècle, Hachette, Prix de l’Aventure industrielle et scientifique
- 1961: Les profondeurs de la terre- Encyclopédie par l'image, Hachette
- 1961: Les tremblements de terre, Hachette
- 1961: Histoire des transports, Fayard, Prix Thérouanne 1962 (Académie française)
- 1962: L’Univers et les frontières de la vie, Hachette
- 1963: Voyage au bout de la science, Hachette, Prix Auguste Furtado 1964 (Académie française)
- 1964: La science du vingtième siècle, Hachette (réédition couronnée par le Prix Jean Macé)
- 1963: La lune, terre d’avenir, Hachette (refonte de Notre amie la Lune)
- 1963: Voyage au bout de la science, Hachette
- 1964: L’astronautique, Hachette
- 1965: L'invention est une aventure, Hachette
- 1967: Explication des paysages de France (La route Paris-Hendaye), Hachette, Prix Broquette-Gonin (literature) 1968
- 1971: Histoire de l’avenir, Hachette
- 1971: Le monde de l’électricité, Hachette
- 1974: Survol de la science française contemporaine, Fayard
- 1977: L’avenir de la Terre, NEL:

=== Some foreign editions ===
This list does not include publications in the Eastern countries.

- 1949: La conquista de la ciencia, Barcelona Éditions Destino
- 1956: Astronomia senza telescopio, Milano, Garzanti, collection Saper tutto 72, translated by Lea Magazzari
- 1959: Man's Conquest of the Stars, 1st American Edition DJ Shelfworn.
- 1959: Man's Conquest of the Stars, Jarrolds London, translated from French by Michael Bullock
- 1959: Moderne uitvindingen, de techniek in de 20ste eeuw, Utrecht, spectrum 431
- 1960: Sie prägten unsere Zeit - Die unbekannten Wegbereiter der modernen Technik, Bechtel - Verlag München
- 1960: Geschichte der Zukunft, Paul List Verlag München
- 1961: Man's Conquest of the Stars, WW Norton, NY
- 1965: Os tremores de terra, Lisboa Editorial Verbo
- 19xx: História das Técnicas e das Invenções
- 1967: The Limits Of Science, Scientific Book Club
- 1971: La vida extraterrestre, Éditions Bruguera
