= Albert Mercier =

French footballer (1895–1969)

Personal information
- Full name: Albert Mercier
- Date of birth: 23 July 1895
- Place of birth: 19th arrondissement of Paris, France
- Date of death: 27 December 1969 (aged 74)
- Place of death: Gonesse, France
- Height: 1.80 m (5 ft 11 in)
- Position: Forward

Senior career*
Years	Team	Apps	(Gls)
1918–1919	Racing Club de France		

International career
1919	France	1	(0)
- * Club domestic league appearances and goals

Albert Mercier (23 July 1895 – 27 December 1969) was a French writer and footballer who played as a midfielder for Racing Club de France and the France national team in the late 1910s.

== Playing career ==
Born in the 19th arrondissement of Paris on 23 July 1895, (Note: Some sources wrongly state that he was born on 7 November 1898.) Mercier was playing for Racing Club de France when he earned his first (and only) international cap for France in a friendly match against Belgium at Uccle on 9 March 1919, which was the country's first-ever match after World War I; it ended in a 2–2 draw. The following day, the journalists of the French newspaper L'Auto (the future L'Équipe) stated that he had played a good match.

He was the second out of four Merciers who played for France, which remains the most recurring surname in the national team; he was preceded by Daniel (1910) and succeeded by Robert (1931) and François in 1942.

== Death ==
Mercier died in Gonesse on 27 December 1969, at the age of 79. (Note: Some sources wrongly state that he died on 12 November 1955.)
