= Jacques Canthelou =

French footballer (1904–1973)

Personal information
- Date of birth: 29 March 1904
- Place of birth: Elbeuf, France
- Date of death: 18 April 1973 (aged 69)
- Place of death: Paris, France

International career
Years	Team	Apps	(Gls)
1924–1928	France	11	(0)

Jacques Canthelou (29 March 1904 – 18 April 1973) was a French footballer. He played in eleven matches for the France national football team between 1924 and 1928.
