= René Pleimelding =

French footballer (1925-1998)

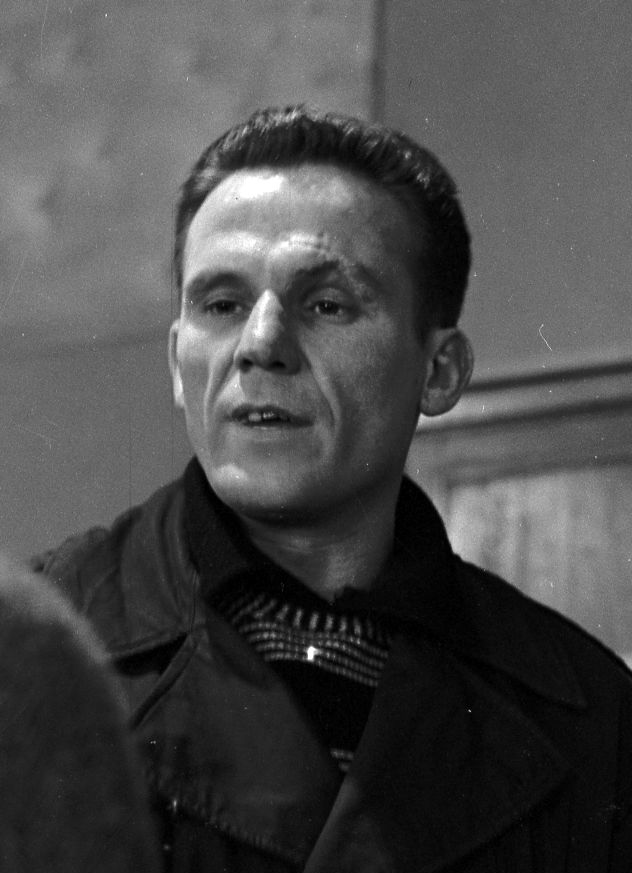

Personal information
- Full name: René Pleimelding
- Date of birth: 13 February 1925
- Place of birth: Joudreville, France
- Date of death: 20 October 1998 (aged 73)
- Position: Defender

Senior career*
Years	Team	Apps	(Gls)
1948–1952	FC Nancy		
1952–1958	Toulouse FC		

International career
1953	France	1	(0)

Managerial career
- 1958–1961: Toulouse FC
- 1961–1964: AS Béziers
- 1961–1964: SR Colmar
- 1964–1967: AS Nancy
- 1970–1971: Troyes AC
- * Club domestic league appearances and goals

René Pleimelding (13 February 1925 – 20 October 1998), was a French football defender and manager who played at the international level for France. He was the father of two professional football players, Pierre Pleimelding and Gérard Pleimelding.

== Honours ==
- Coupe de France winner: 1957
