= Marcel Boulanger =

French sculptor

Marcel Boulanger was a French sculptor and interiors artist who was in demand during the Belle Époque for decorating elaborate hotels and private residences. He decorated the lounge of the Ritz Hotel in the Louis XIV style during its construction from 1905–1906. In 1909–1910, Claridge's Hotel determined to renovate their facility to better compete with the newly completed Ritz. They hired Boulanger to create the relief sculptures of the ballroom in the Parisian style of Louis XV.

Boulanger collected Louis XIV, XV, and XVI furniture for his clientele, who generally included the upper echelons of society, like Jacques Seligmann and Robert Fleming. Fleming hired Boulanger in 1912 to design the dining room of his residence at 27 Grosvenor Square. Though he often worked in London, Boulanger's offices were located at the Hotel Nicolai in Paris.
