= Courville, Marne =

Courville
- Commune
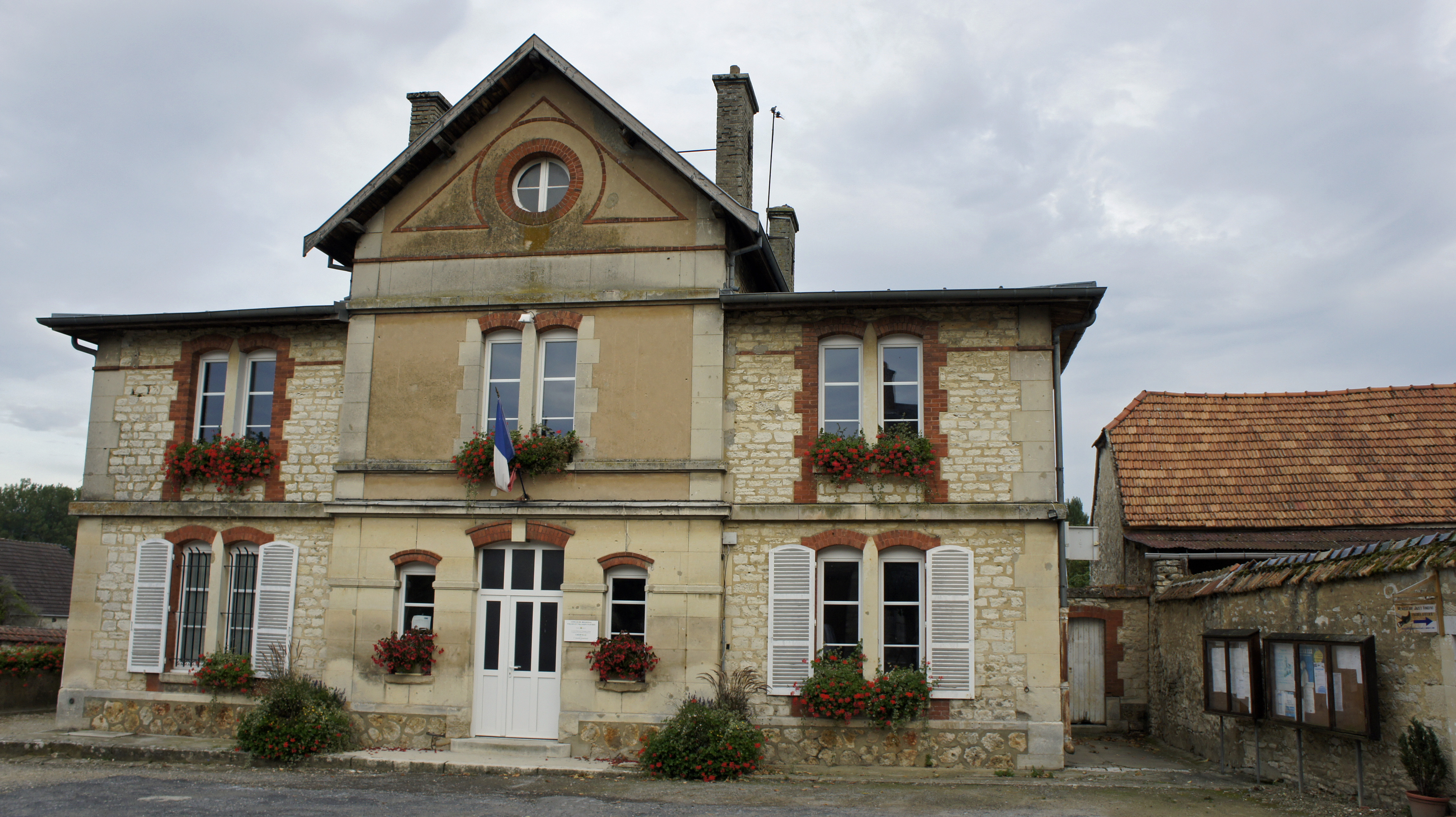
- The town hall in Courville
- Location of Courville
- Location within France Location within Grand Est
- Coordinates: 49°16′07″N 3°41′52″E
- Country: France
- Region: Grand Est
- Department: Marne
- Arrondissement: Reims
- Canton: Fismes-Montagne de Reims
- Intercommunality: CU Grand Reims

Government
  - Mayor (2020–2026): Vincent Bennezon
- Area^{1}: 11.94 km^{2} (4.61 sq mi)
- Elevation: 71 m (233 ft)
- Population (2023): 448
  - Density: 37.5/km^{2} (97.2/sq mi)
- Time zone: UTC+01:00 (CET)
  - Summer (DST): UTC+02:00 (CEST)
- INSEE/Postal code: 51194 /51170
- ^{1} French Land Register data, which excludes lakes, ponds, glaciers > 1 km^{2} (0.386 sq mi or 247 acres) and river estuaries.

Courville is a commune in the Marne department in north-eastern France.

== See also ==
- Communes of the Marne department

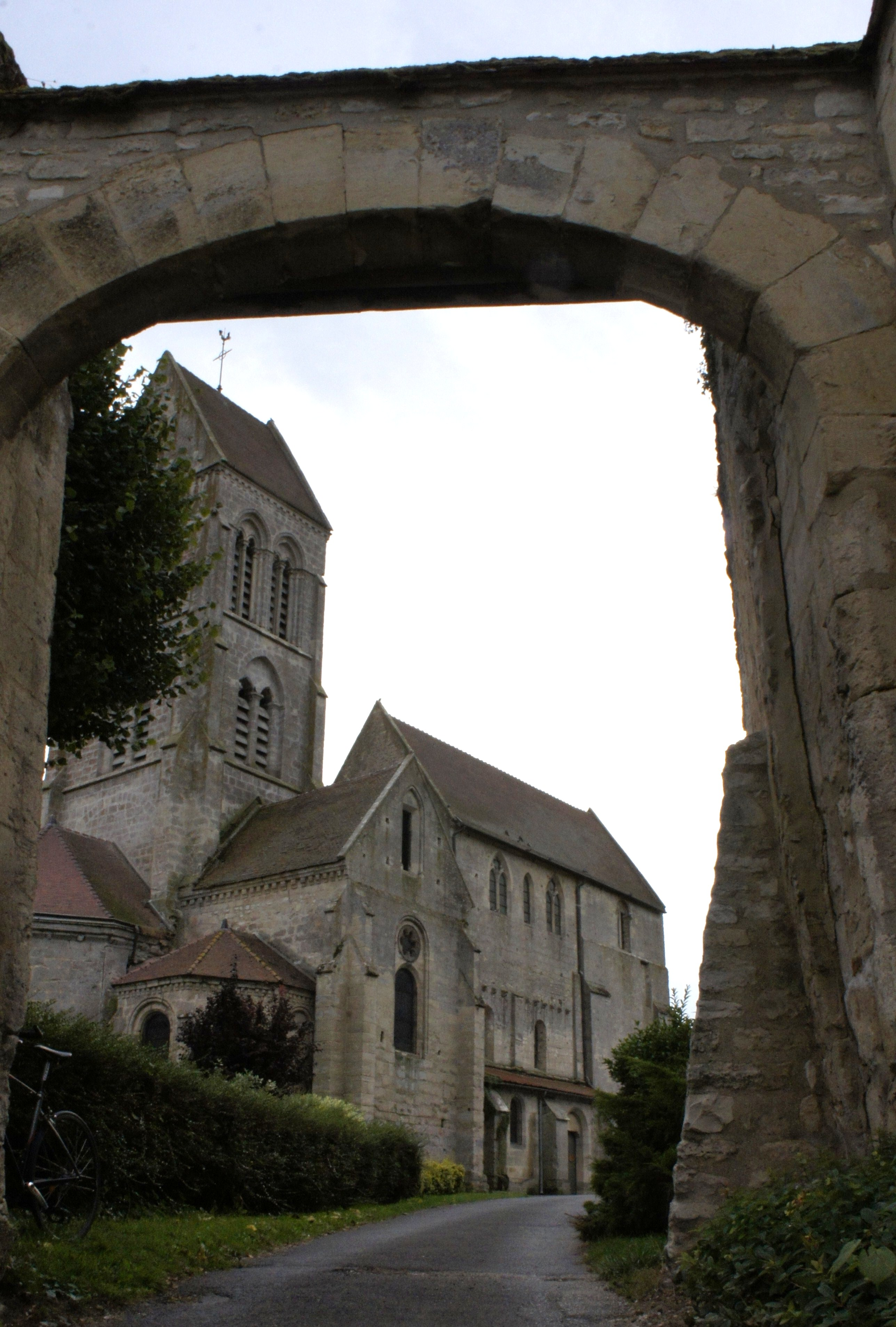
