= Pierre Pleimelding =

French footballer (1952–2013)

Personal information
- Date of birth: 19 September 1952
- Place of birth: Laxou, France
- Date of death: 1 May 2013 (aged 60)
- Position: Forward

Youth career
- 1964–1967: Colmar

Senior career*
Years	Team	Apps	(Gls)
1967–1970	Nancy		
1970–1971	Troyes		
1971–1974	Colmar		
1974–1977	Monaco		
1977–1981	Lille		
1981–1982	Servette		
1982–1983	Cannes		
1983–1985	Mulhouse		
1985–1986	SAS Épinal		

International career
1978	France	1	(0)

Managerial career
- 1986–1993: SAS Épinal
- 1994–1996: Ivory Coast
- 1996–2003: FCSR Haguenau
- * Club domestic league appearances and goals

Pierre Pleimelding (19 September 1952 – 1 May 2013) was a French football striker and manager who obtained a cap for France. He is the son of another professional footballer, René Pleimelding and the brother of Gérard Pleimelding.
