= Jacques Dhur =

French footballer (1902–1983)

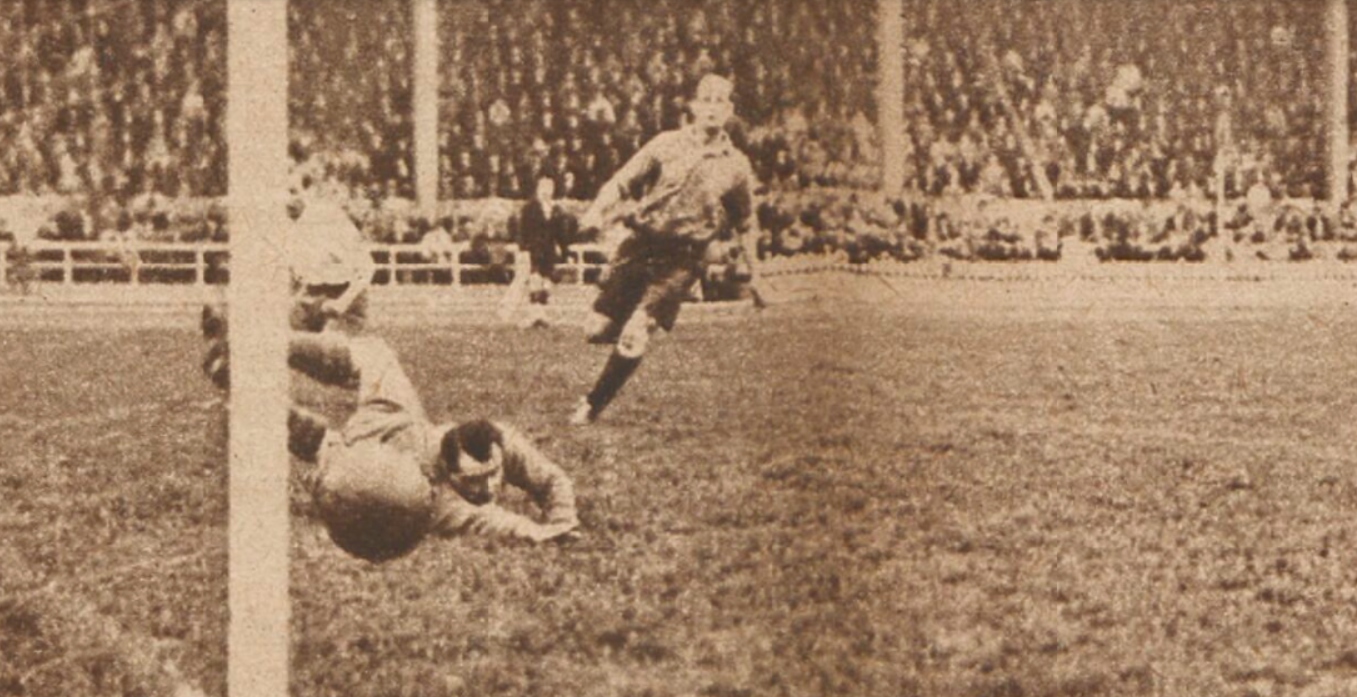
- Dhur diving, in vain, to block the ball in the 1928 Coupe de France semifinals

Personal information
- Birth name: Jacques Le Héno
- Date of birth: 23 February 1902
- Place of birth: 13th arrondissement of Paris, France
- Date of death: 26 December 1983 (aged 81)
- Place of death: Challans, France
- Height: 1.65 m (5 ft 5 in)
- Position: Goalkeeper

Youth career
- 1915: Paris Université Club

Senior career*
Years	Team	Apps	(Gls)
1920–1928	Stade Français		

International career
1927	France	1	(0)
1927	Paris	+1	(0)
- * Club domestic league appearances and goals

Jacques Dhur (23 February 1902 – 26 December 1983) was a French footballer who played as a forward for Stade Français and the French national team in the mid-1920s.

== Early life ==
Jacques Le Héno was born in the 13th arrondissement of Paris on 23 February 1902, as the son of Félix Le Héno, a pamphleteer who defended Émile Zola during the Dreyfus affair, and who was better known by the pseudonym Jacques Dhur, which his son would later also adopt, using as early as 25 August 1920, on his first license, published by the FFF.

== Playing career ==
Dhur began his career with the team of Collège Sainte-Barbe, where he was studying, featuring as a goalkeeper as early as 1914, aged only 12, and the following year, on 2 November 1915, he played for the Paris Université Club. In addition to football, he also practiced the 110 meter hurdles and high jump, but due to his small size of 1.65 m (5 ft 5 in), he had difficulty with aerial balls. He was signed by Stade Français in the early 1920s, where he quickly established himself as the team's undisputed starting goalkeeper, helping his side win the USFSA Paris Championship in 1925 and 1926, which brought him to the attention of France's head coach, Gaston Barreau.

Therefore, on 6 March 1927, the 25-year-old Dhur earned his first (and only) international cap for France in a friendly against Portugal in Lisbon, conceding four goals in a 4–0 loss. Rather than blame the overall performance of the team, six of whom were described as "ersatz" by the press, or the state of the pitch, which had been heavily affected by torrential rain, Dhur simply admitted being responsible for the last two goals. That same week, he also played a friendly for the Paris football team at the Colombes, where he did "not commit any fault" in a 3–1 loss to Gipuzkoa.

In the semifinals of the 1927–28 Coupe de France, Dhur dislocated his knee in a collision with Red Star's Juste Brouzes, but since no substitutions were allowed at the time, he had to remain on the field as his side was trashed 2–8. His team went on to win the 1928 French Excellence Championship, but his injury forced him to miss the final, being replaced by Henri Martinod, and also forced him to retire, aged only 26.

== Later life and death ==
In 1967, Dhur became the president of a small club based in Saint-Jean-de-Monts. He died in Challans on 26 December 1983, at the age of 81.

== Honours ==
Stade Français

- USFSA Paris Championship
  - Champions (2): 1925 and 1926
- French Excellence Championship
  - Champions (1): 1928
