= Albert Courquin (footballer) =

French footballer

Personal information
- Full name: Albert Félix Emile Courquin
- Date of birth: 5 August 1898
- Place of birth: Bourbourg, Nord, France
- Date of death: 2 February 1940 (aged 41)
- Place of death: Saint-Pol-sur-Ternoise, France
- Position: Midfielder

Senior career*
Years	Team	Apps	(Gls)
1920–1921	Red Star		
1921–1923	Olympique Lillois		
1924–1926	Red Star		
1926–?	US Saint-Pol		

International career
1922	France	1	(0)
1924	France B	1	(0)
- * Club domestic league appearances and goals

Albert Félix Emile Courquin (5 August 1898 – 2 February 1940) was a French footballer who played as a midfielder for Red Star, Olympique Lillois, and the French national team in the early 1920s.

== Early life ==
Albert Courquin was born on 5 August 1898 in Bourbourg, Nord, (Note: Some sources wrongly claim that he was born on 1 January 1897.) as the son of Albert Courquin (1875–?) and Marie Desoutter (1873–1899). He married Mathilde Gailly.

== Playing career ==
After playing for Red Star, Courquin joined Olympique Lillois in 1921, where he helped his team win the 1922 Division of Honor of the North (DH Nord). He quickly became one of the club's best players, and thus, on 15 January 1922, he earned his first (and only) international cap in a friendly match against Belgium at Colombes, helping his side to a 2–1 win.

Two years later, on 13 January 1924, Courquin started for France B in a friendly match against the A-team of Luxembourg, helping his side to a 2–1 win. After leaving Lillois in 1923, he returned to Red Star, where he played from 1924 to 1926. He later played for US Saint-Pol, being the only player in the club's history, along with Fernand Caucheteux, who wore the French jersey.

== Death ==
Recalled to military activity in August 1939, Courquin was quickly discharged due to hypertensive nephritis, from which he died on 2 February 1940, at the age of 41, at his home in Saint-Pol-sur-Ternoise.

== Honours ==
CASG Paris

- DH Nord:
  - Champions (1): 1922
