= History of Stade Rennais FC =

Stade Rennais FC is a French football club based in Rennes. This article depicts the history of the club beginning with its foundation to its current state.

== History ==
=== Early years ===
Stade Rennais was founded on 10 March 1901 by former students from Rennes. Their first match took place two weeks later against FC Rennais, which they lost 6–0. In 1902, the club acquired the "Omnisport" status and became part of the USFSA. The following year, Stade Rennais was a founding member of the Brittany Football League, which they won in its inaugural 1903 season. By the end of the season, the club had won the second "série", beating FC Rennes 4–0 in the final.

Key players of the Stade Rennais in 1903 were Martin Peter, Langelier Montouan, Mr. Duchesne, Guilbert Ghis, Mr. Marcel, Mr. Leroy, Mr. Audren, and Mr. Jamin. Duchesne, Jamin, Peter, and Ghis were amongst the founding members of the club in 1901.

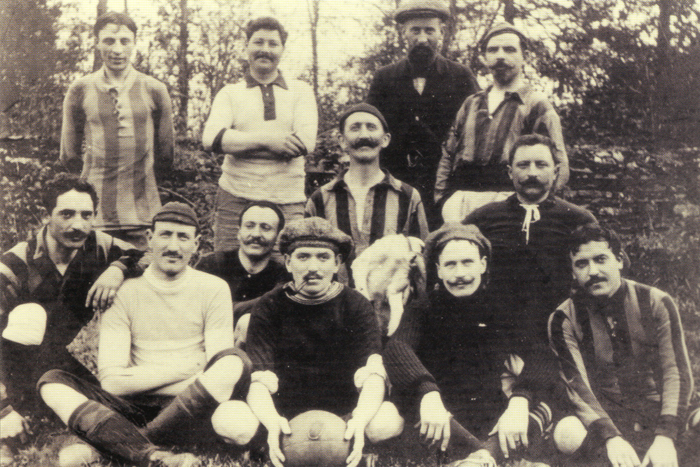
Stade Rennais in 1904

On 4 May 1904, Stade Rennais and FC Rennais merged to give birth to Stade Rennais Université Club.

The merger left the Stade Rennais UC with one main opponent in Brittany, the Union Sportive Servanaise. Close misses in 1905, 1906, and 1907 against the US Servanaise lead President Sexer of the SRUC to hire Welsh footballer Griffith as player-manager-captain. Having played in the English Football League for several years, Griffith adopted an English approach to management and tactics at the Stade Rennais, and won the Brittany football league in 1908 and 1909.

However, Griffith was unable to retain the title in 1910 as the US Servanaise finished as champions with two points more than the Stade Rennais UC. US Servannaise's domination continued for the next four years as they won five titles on the run, with each time the Stade Rennais UC second, less than five points behind the champions.

Stade Rennais first kit

During World War I, Rennes were allowed to participate in the Allied Cup (Inter-federation French Championship) as well as the Rennes Cup, since the Brittany league was interrupted by the war. After winning easily the Rennes Cup, Griffith lead his players to a number of surprise wins against better known clubs and were finalists thanks to a 3–0 win against Le Havre and a 5–0 win over the Entente Suisse. The final, played in Paris against FC Lyon, was delayed several times, but in the end, the Rouge et Noirs became Interfederal Champions of France thanks to a 7–1 win.

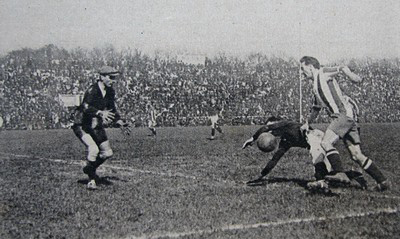
The final match in the French Cup 1922 between Stade Rennais and Red Star Saint-Quen

The following year, Rennes had a successful run in the Interfederation cup but were unable to retain their title. Having become a strong national side, since Rennes won the Upper Brittany League in 1918, as well as the Allies Cup in 1916 and 1917, the post-war period was one of great success for the Stade Rennais UC: Western Champions in 1919, 1920, 1921, and 1923, the Stade Rennais was also finalist of the French Cup in 1922, losing 2–0 against Red Star Saint-Ouen. The squad in the 1922 final was notable for the presence for François Hughes, the first French international to play for Rennes, and considered to be one of the best French centre-forwards of his time.

In 1924, the Stade Rennais Université Club merged with the Rennes Etudiant-Club, keeping the name of Stade Rennais Université Club. The season was disappointing however, with Rennes finishing outside the top 2 places of the league they were playing in for the first time since 1907, being 3rd in the Western Division.

The President of the Stade Rennais, Isidore Odorico, brought several foreign players to the club (Lothka, Szabo, Nico...), but the side remained unable to win the Western Division, and President Odorico's attitude towards both amateurism and restrictions on foreign players conflicted with the Western Division's direction. As other teams rose in the Western Division (Stade Quimpérois and CSJB Angers), Rennes decided to retire from the Western Division in 1929.

For three years, the Stade Rennais Université Club was no longer part of the Western Division, and played only friendly games. They managed to attract good international sparring-partners, however, such as Sparta Prague, Slavia Prague, Austria Vienna, Budapest, and nationwide known sides such as Red Star Saint-Ouen, Olympique de Marseille or FC Sochaux-Montbéliard.

=== Professional years ===
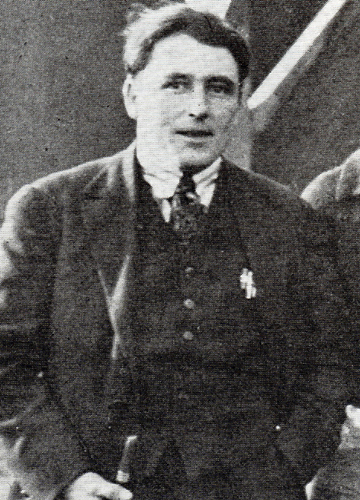
The presidency of Isidore Odorico marked the history of the club during the 1920–1930s.

In 1932, the FFF started the French professional football league. Whilst Odorico's policy was in favour of professionalism, the club was in a dire financial state after having missed 3 seasons of league football, and despite the support the club had in Rennes, the Stade Rennais' application to enter the professional football league was rejected on the basis that club finances were too fragile. Odorico managed to convince supporters to donate money to the club, and after the club's financial fragility had been solved, the FFF accepted the Stade Rennais amongst the 20 clubs to participate in the first season.

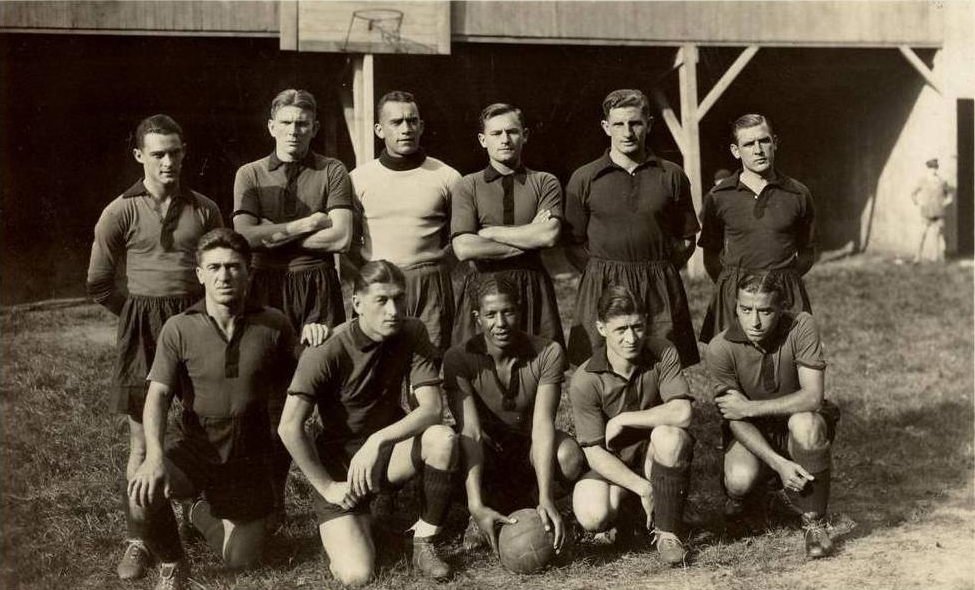
Stade Rennais, 1936–37

Rennes' start to professional football was encouraging, with a 6th place in their first season. However, the club's financial situation didn't improve, and by 1937 the club had to be subsidised by the town of Rennes after the mayor was put under pressure by local commerce. When the second World War started in 1939, the French football league was disbanded, and the Stade Rennais Université Club reverted to amateur status. For two years, the Stade only played in the French Cup, as well as friendly matches against local sides. In 1941, Rennes took part in the Occupied Area Division of the French League, but finished a disappointing 7th out of 9. The following season confirmed Rennes low level with a 14th position out of 16 in the North Zone Division.

In 1943, the Vichy régime reinstated the interfederal French football league. Rennes-Bretagne was one of the 16 federations to be part of the league, and although the Stade Rennais UC was the only team in Brittany to have been in Division 1 only two players of the Stade Rennais were chosen to be part of the squad : Henri Guérin and Jean Prouff.

Those years were the beginning of stability at the club, but the 1990–91 season was a failure, despite players such as François Omam-Biyik and Arnold Oosterveer. However, the team was saved from relegation thanks to the administrative relegations of OGC Nice and Stade Brestois. The following year, in 1991–92, Rennes was not able to avoid relegation. The club began to play with young players from its youth academy, such as Sylvain Wiltord, Jocelyn Gourvennec, Ulrich Le Pen and Laurent Huard, and were able to return to Division 1. On July 7, 1993 Pinault group became the main sponsor of the club, with its brands Pinault. The club has been playing in the top division since this date. During this era, the team had players such as Marco Grassi and Shabani Nonda.

=== Pinault years ===
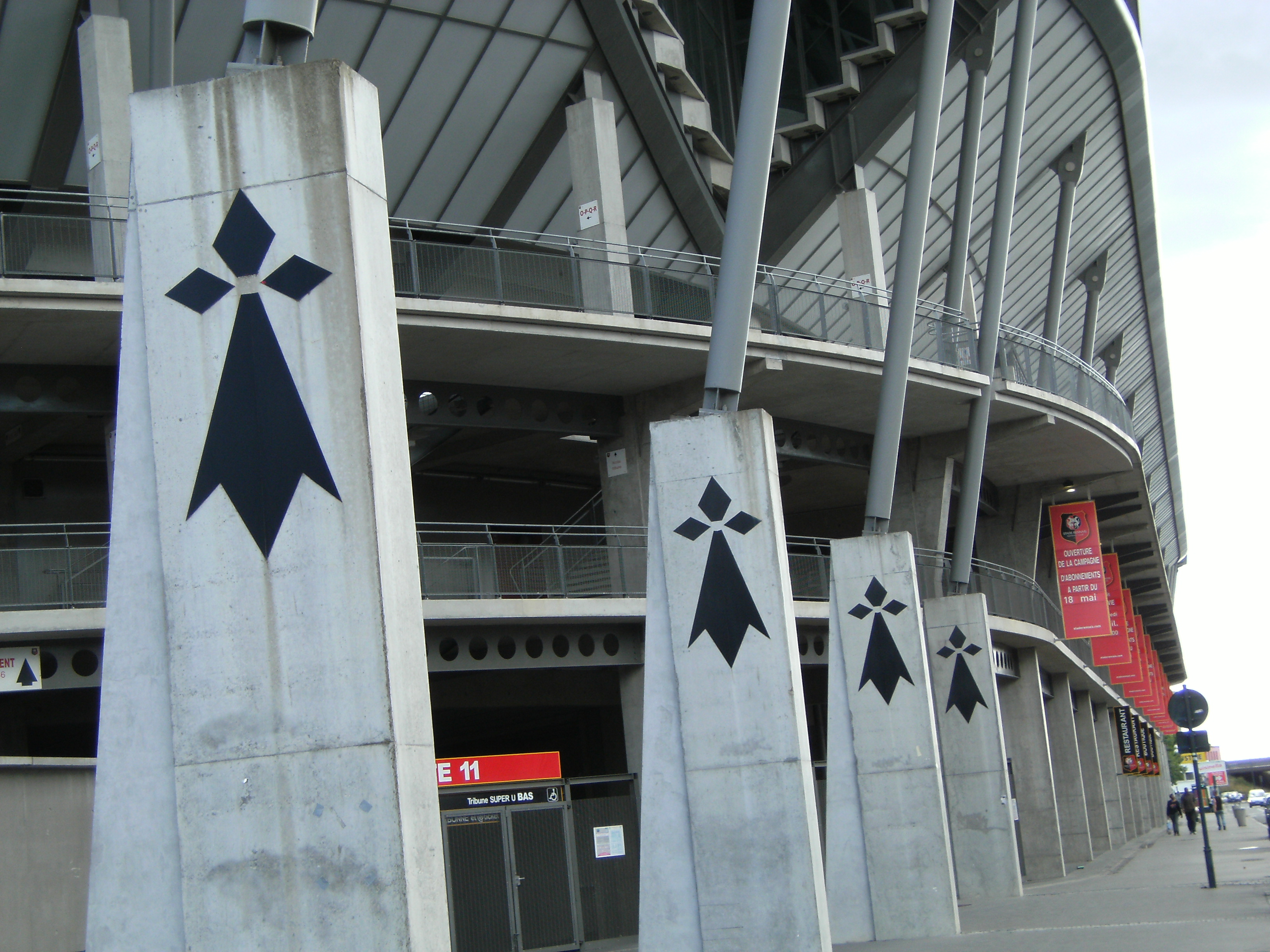
Breton Hermine symbols decorating the pillars of the Stade de la Route de Lorient, renovated in 2001

In 1998, Breton businessman François Pinault, a great fan of the team, bought the team and gave it a strong financial stability. He was ambitious from the start. Rennais bought stars at a high price such as South-American Lucas Severino (140 millions of French franc), Mario Hector Turdo for the Division 1 2000-01 but these players were all failures. The team has now changed from this strategy and once again uses players from its youth academy, arguably one of the best in France, and at one point the best for three consecutive years.

In the Ligue 1 2004–05 campaign, Rennes managed to finish in a commendable fourth place in the final standings, their best ever position, securing them automatic qualification for the UEFA Cup. In the 2005–06 season, following a very close race for the UEFA Champions League and UEFA Cup qualifications in France, they finished a disappointing seventh place. In 2006–07 season Rennes again finished in fourth place, missing out on a UEFA Champions League place as a result of a Lille goal in the 93rd minute of the last game of the season. But they did secure UEFA Cup football for next season, despite absence of Alexander Frei and Kim Källström.

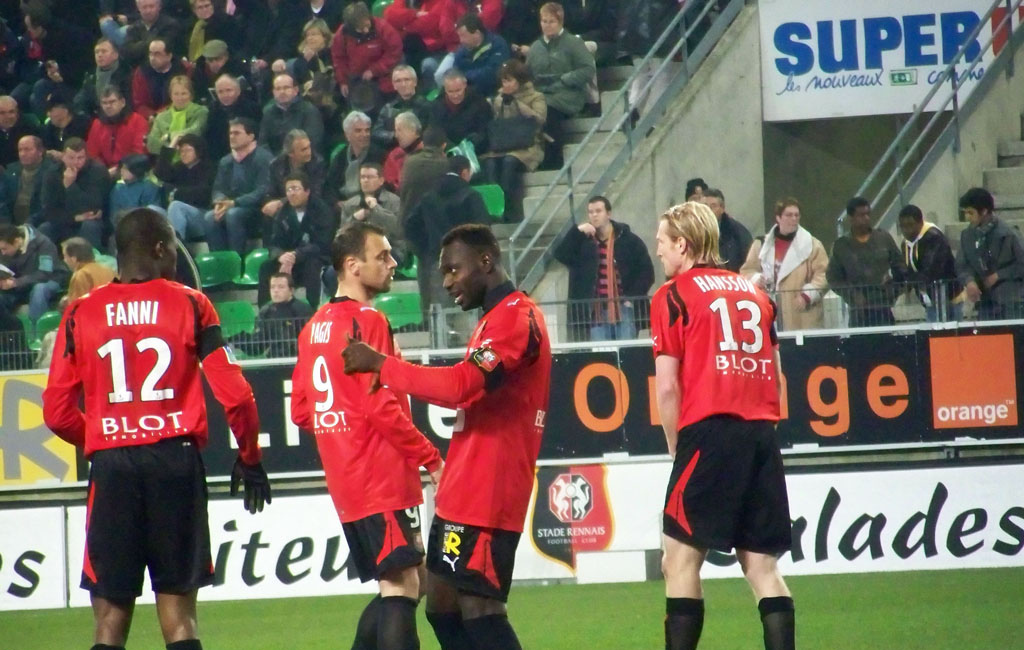
Rod Fanni, Mickaël Pagis, Jirès Kembo-Ekoko, and Petter Hansson during the match against FC Lorient on 28 February 2008

In 2007–08, Rennes again qualified for the Intertoto Cup by finishing 6th. After having done a huge recruitment (Jérôme Leroy, Sylvain Wiltord, Mickael Pagis, Rod Fanni), Rennes was considered as a challenger for this 2007–08 season. A strong start to the season had them in 3rd place in November, but a string of nine defeats saw them plummet down the table. The team reacted, however, and finished the season in 6th. As a consequence of those losses, Pierre Dréossi, the coach, vacated his coaching position, and Guy Lacombe was hired as coach. Dréossi remains in the staff as a general manager.

During the 2008–09 season, Rennes went on an 18-game unbeaten streak, only suffering a single loss, 1–0 away to Grenoble on 17 August 2008. The club eventually finished the season in 7th-place position. However, Rennes managed to reach the final of the prestigious Coup de France in 2009, facing En Avant de Guingamp. The match, a Breton derby, was played at Stade de France in Paris on 10 May, but Rennes missed its chance by losing 1–2.

Arguably still considering itself the leading Breton football club, Rennes decided in 2009 to found a new club tradition: the de facto national hymn of Brittany, the Bro Gozh ma Zadoù, will from September 2009 be played at the opening of each match at the Stade de la Route the Lorient.

To meet the 2010–11 season, Rennes started a process to regenerate its first team. An agreement to transfer Moussa Sow to Lille OSC was completed in June and the arrival of Georges Mandjeck, Onyekachi Apam, Victor Hugo Montano and Johann Carrasso was confirmed the same month. For the price of €6,5 Million, the successful Colombian forward Víctor Montaño was also drafted from Montpellier HSC, expected to add significant offensive strength. The Swedish defender Petter Hansson and the forward Jimmy Briand with 102 and 169 matches played for Stade Rennais, were sold to AS Monaco and Lyon respectively.

== See also ==
- Stade Rennais FC
- Stade Rennais FC Training Centre
