= Stade Rennais FC Training Centre =

Football academy in Rennes

- Centre de formation du Stade rennais FC
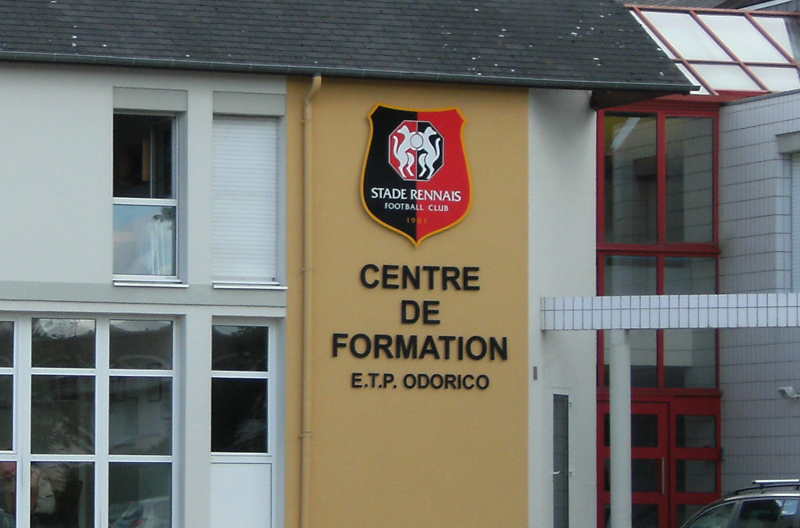

- Location within France
- Address: 6, rue Moulin du Comte; 35000 Rennes; Rennes; France
- Coordinates: 48°06′29″N 1°42′39″W
- Owner: Stade Rennais FC
- Operator: Stade Rennais FC

Construction
- Opened: Late 1970s
- Renovated: 1987

Tenants
- Stade Rennais FC (since 1987)

The Stade Rennais FC training centre is a soccer training centre. It aims to train young players for Stade Rennais FC, a professional football club based in Rennes, Brittany, by providing them with accommodation, academic support, and a sports training program. As a structure, it has existed since the late 1970s but has only been developed since 1987 with the creation of the Odorico private technical school. Before this, there was no dedicated training structure at the club, but this did not prevent the existence of youth teams. They won several titles, including the Coupe Gambardella in 1973.

Over the years, Stade Rennais's commitment to youth training has led to the emergence of several youngsters who have joined the club's senior squad. Under the direction of Patrick Rampillon, who was director from 1987 to 2014, the training centre enjoyed several sporting successes, winning French championship titles in certain categories, as well as two more Coupe Gambardellas in 2003 and 2008. From 2006 to 2011, it also ranked first among French training centres in an annual ranking by the National Technical Directorate. A fourth Coupe Gambardella was claimed in 2025.

== History ==
=== The beginnings of training at Stade Rennais ===
Stade Rennais has never been able to train and keep its quality players (...). I also believe that managers who encourage young people to give up everything for soccer should make it their duty to help them find a new social role later on.

— André Bordier, former Stade Rennais player, 1977

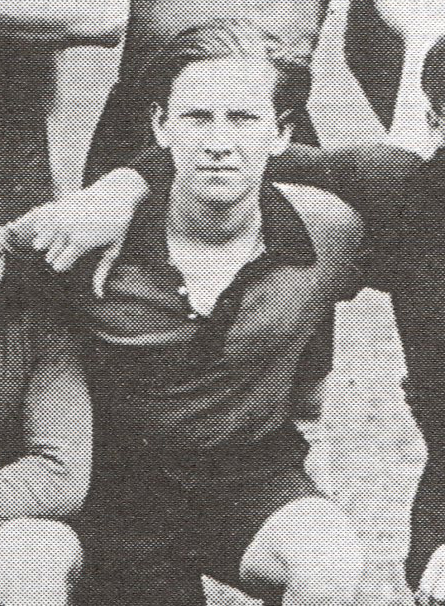
Jean Prouff here at the age of 15, took his first license at Stade Rennais in 1933.

For several decades, like other French clubs, Stade Rennais had no facilities for training young footballers. However, this did not prevent it from having youth teams and instructors to train and supervise them, such as Louis Bonneville from before the Second World War, or the German Fritz Raemer. Raemer led the club's junior team to a 5-1 victory over Red Star in the final of the Coupe de France des Espoirs on May 5, 1935. Four years later, the Stade Rennais youngsters reached the final of the Coupe Nationale des Juniors, the forerunner of the Coupe Gambardella, but were beaten by OFC Charleville. The training was then limited to players whose families lived in Rennes, many even natives of the city. (Note: Among the squad that won the Coupe de France des Espoirs in 1935, three of the six players whose place of birth is known - Serge Bauché, Alphonse David, and Léon Poirier - were born in Rennes. The family of Jean Prouff, born in Peillac, Morbihan, moved to Rennes during his childhood. The other two players, Charles Nicolas and Paul Le Guerrier, were respectively born in Brest and Le Mesnil-Drey in the Manche department. Sources: Loire (1994, p. 173) (team composition), Loire (1997) (birthplaces).) Players from the rest of Brittany only arrived in Rennes and at Stade Rennais when they reached university age, attracted by the regional capital's status as a university town. Despite SRUC's dominant position over other Rennes clubs, (Note: "Stade rennais université-club" (SRUC) was the name given to the club between 1904 and 1972.) many Rennes-born players—who went on to shine for the red and black—did not make their debut there. Yves Boutet, the record holder for the number of professional matches played for Stade Rennais, only joined the club in 1955, seven years after making his debut at Tour d'Auvergne Rennes; born in the Marne but raised in Rennes, international Henri Guérin followed a similar path, starting at Tour d'Auvergne before joining Stade Rennais at the age of twenty-two; finally, another international, Adolphe Touffait, came through the ranks with the Cadets de Bretagne before joining the club the year he turned eighteen.

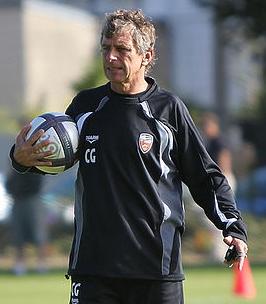
Christian Gourcuff, here in 2010, won the Coupe Gambardella in 1973 with Stade Rennais.

In 1973, the Rennes outfit returned to the limelight with a victorious run in the Coupe Gambardella. After successively eliminating Drapeau de Fougères, US Janzé, RC Arras, Stade Poitevin, CS Sedan, and AS Monaco, the Rennais found themselves up against AS Brestoise in the final, defeated on penalties (1-1, 6-5) at the Penvillers stadium in Quimper. The team, coached by Frédo Garel, included a future international, goalkeeper Pierrick Hiard; several players who went on to professional careers, such as Jean-Paul Rabier, Jean-Luc Arribart, and Jean-Marc Orhan; and Christian Gourcuff, who went on to make a name for himself as a coach.

=== From the creation of the first structure to ETP Odorico ===
In France, the 1970s saw the creation of the first training centres, under the impetus of Fernand Sastre and Georges Boulogne, with professional clubs obliged to set up a structure of this type. In Rennes, it wasn't until 1977-1978 (Note: The year in which the Stade Rennais training centre was founded differs from source to source. Either 1977 (see "Centre de formation" [Training centre]. staderennais.com (in French)., or 1978 (see “Le centre de formation”, Loire & Charbonneau (2001, p. 111)).) that the city council released a budget of 200,000 francs for the creation of the club's structure. At the time, the club was mired in serious financial difficulties, (Note: In January 1978, Stade Rennais was on the verge of extinction. Placed in receivership, the club managed to turn things around.) and the first premises to welcome young footballers, set up near the Route de Lorient sports park, were modest. Loïc Kerbiriou, who was still playing for the club at the time, was the short-lived first director of the centre.

Michel Beaulieu, who succeeded Kerbiriou, was himself a former player trained at the club in the 1960s. Under his leadership, the club's precarious position—mainly in the second division—prevented the training centre from playing its role as a route to the first team. In 1985, Rennes mayor Edmond Hervé stressed the need for the club to base its operations on the promotion of the young players it could train. Gradually, the training centre was equipped with a technical team responsible for supervising its boarders, and a new building was constructed in 1987. Called the Odorico Private Technical School, (Note: Named after Isidore Odorico, former player and manager of Stade Rennais, who was behind the club's adoption of professionalism in 1932, and was president between 1933 and 1938.) it was built near the Route de Lorient stadium. At the same time, the "ETP Odorico" association was created, making it easier for the school to obtain subsidies. As for Michel Beaulieu, he hands over the reins to Patrick Rampillon. Rampillon, also a former club player, retired from the sport in 1983 and joined the technical staff attached to the centre. After a short spell as first-team coach, he became director of the training centre in the summer of 1987.

=== First results, first problems ===
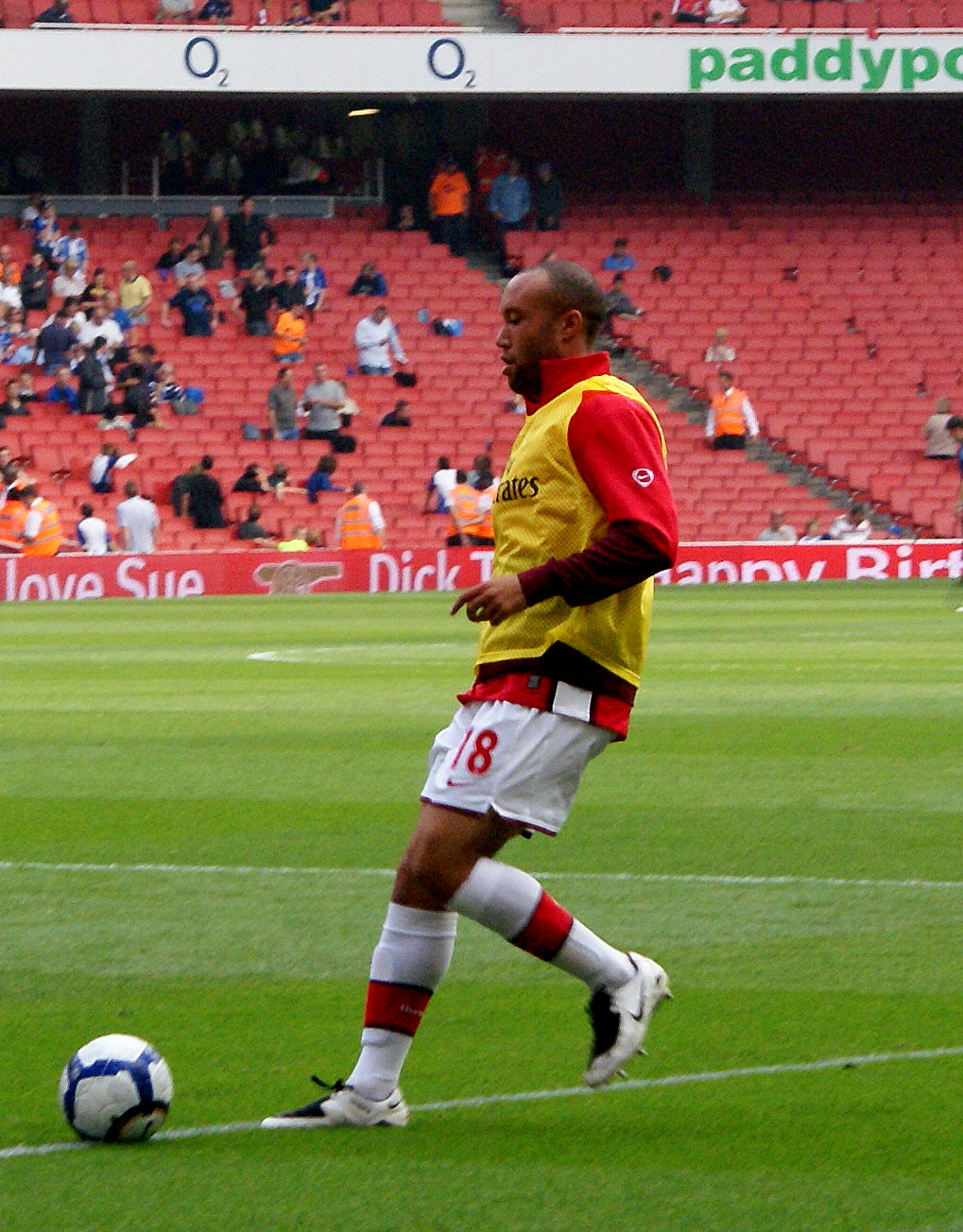
In 1998, Mikaël Silvestre refused to turn professional at Stade Rennais, and joined Inter Milan with Ousmane Dabo.

The success of the training centre and the promotion of youngsters from the Grand Ouest region to the professional ranks became an objective shared by the municipality and the club. Rampillon set out to improve training, using innovative practices such as a four-day training camp organized in December 1987 for the under-18s at London club Queens Park Rangers, who went on to finish fifth in the English league. In the 1990s, these efforts began to bear fruit. Youth recruitment naturally focused on local players such as Laurent Huard, who made his first-team debut in December 1990 at the age of seventeen, but also on players from the rest of France, thanks to a growing detection network. In 1991, former Rennes player Daniel Rodighiero introduced Sylvain Wiltord to Patrick Rampillon, enabling the player to join the training centre a few months later.

While the integration of players from the centre into the first team is visible, progress is also highlighted by their presence in the French youth teams. In 1996, Yoann Bigné, Mikaël Silvestre, and Ludovic Roy became European champions with the French U19 team. Four years later, they were followed by Gaël Danic, Jean-Félix Dorothée, and Steven Pelé, who were crowned champions in Germany. Yoann Gourcuff, Olivier N'Siabamfumu, and Moussa Sow followed suit in 2005, and Abdoulaye Diallo in 2010. Last but not least, Florent Chaigneau and Jacques Faty, winners of the Under-17 World Cup in 2001, were crowned world champions.

At Rennes, we were offered a five-year contract with a fixed salary. When we tried to negotiate, the directors told us: 'If you don't sign within a fortnight, you'll get the minimum stipulated in the charter'. Rennes didn't budge an inch, so we didn't sign, the remaining level 3 trainees (...) Then Inter made the move and we didn't hesitate.

— Ousmane Dabo in 1998

On the other side of the coin, this success attracted the interest of other clubs. The summer of 1998 was marked at Rennes by a dispute between the club's directors and youngsters Mikaël Silvestre and Ousmane Dabo. The two young players, who had made substantial additions to the first-team squad in previous years, (Note: In total, without ever having played for Rennes under a professional contract, Silvestre played 53 games for the first team, while Dabo played 44.) were unable to reach an agreement with Stade Rennais on the professional contracts they had been promised. Taking advantage of a legal loophole and circumventing the obligation to turn professional at their training club, the two players opted for exile in Italy, signing for Inter Milan. Feeling aggrieved, the club took their case to Fifa, demanding financial compensation of 60 million francs, but in the end, only obtained 28 million. This was a far cry from the 100 million francs that Inter subsequently reaped from the transfer of the two players a few years later.

=== At the pinnacle of French training ===
Eventually, the foundations of the team will rest in our training centre. For the time being, we must give our youngsters the means to play so that they can show their worth. At the same time, we need to make room for some of them to join the squad at some point.

— Pierre Dréossi, general manager of Stade Rennais, 2002

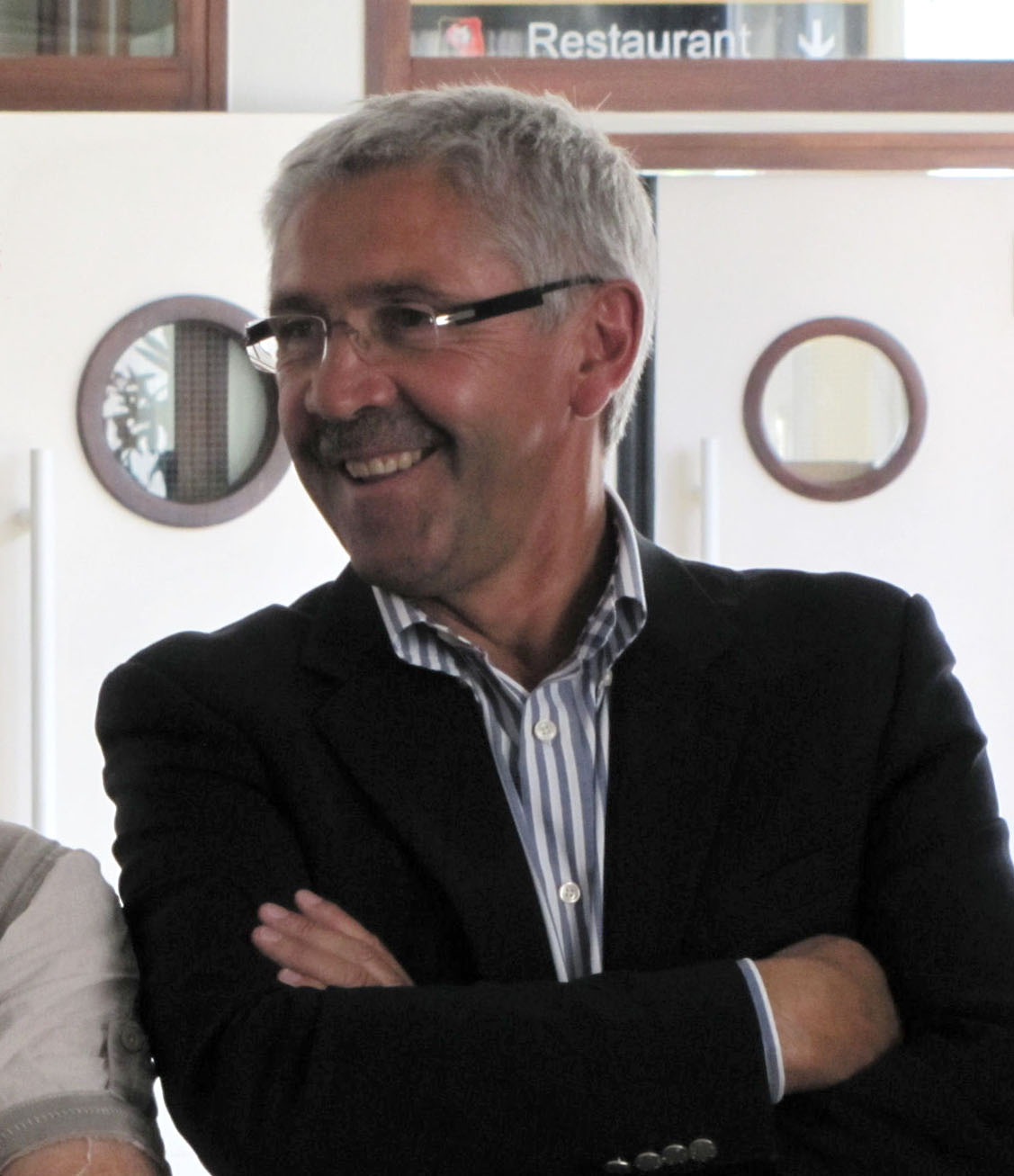
Patrick Rampillon, director of the training centre from 1987 to 2014.

After four years at the helm of the club, François Pinault instigated a new policy in the summer of 2002, which placed increasing emphasis on training. In the space of just a few seasons, the centre's budget quadrupled to four million euros, to build up a workforce 50% trained at the club. In 2003, this policy also led to the search for a coach with the profile of a trainer, eager to help young players progress and build on their skills. This choice was echoed by the advent of a generation that successively won the 17-year-old national championship in 2002, the Coupe Gambardella in 2003, and the French championship for professional reserves in 2004. Among this generation, several players quickly embarked on professional careers at the highest level, including Jacques Faty, Grégory Bourillon, and Arnold Mvuemba, but above all Jimmy Briand and Yoann Gourcuff, (Note: Yoann Gourcuff is the son of Christian Gourcuff. Both won the Coupe Gambardella with Stade Rennais, 30 years apart.) who went on to join the French national team. Most of these players were launched into Ligue 1 by László Bölöni, some even before their eighteenth birthday, like Gourcuff. (Note: Yoann Gourcuff made his Ligue 1 debut on February 7, 2004. He turned eighteen on July 11 (see "Yoann Gourcuff". stade-rennais-online.com (in French).).)

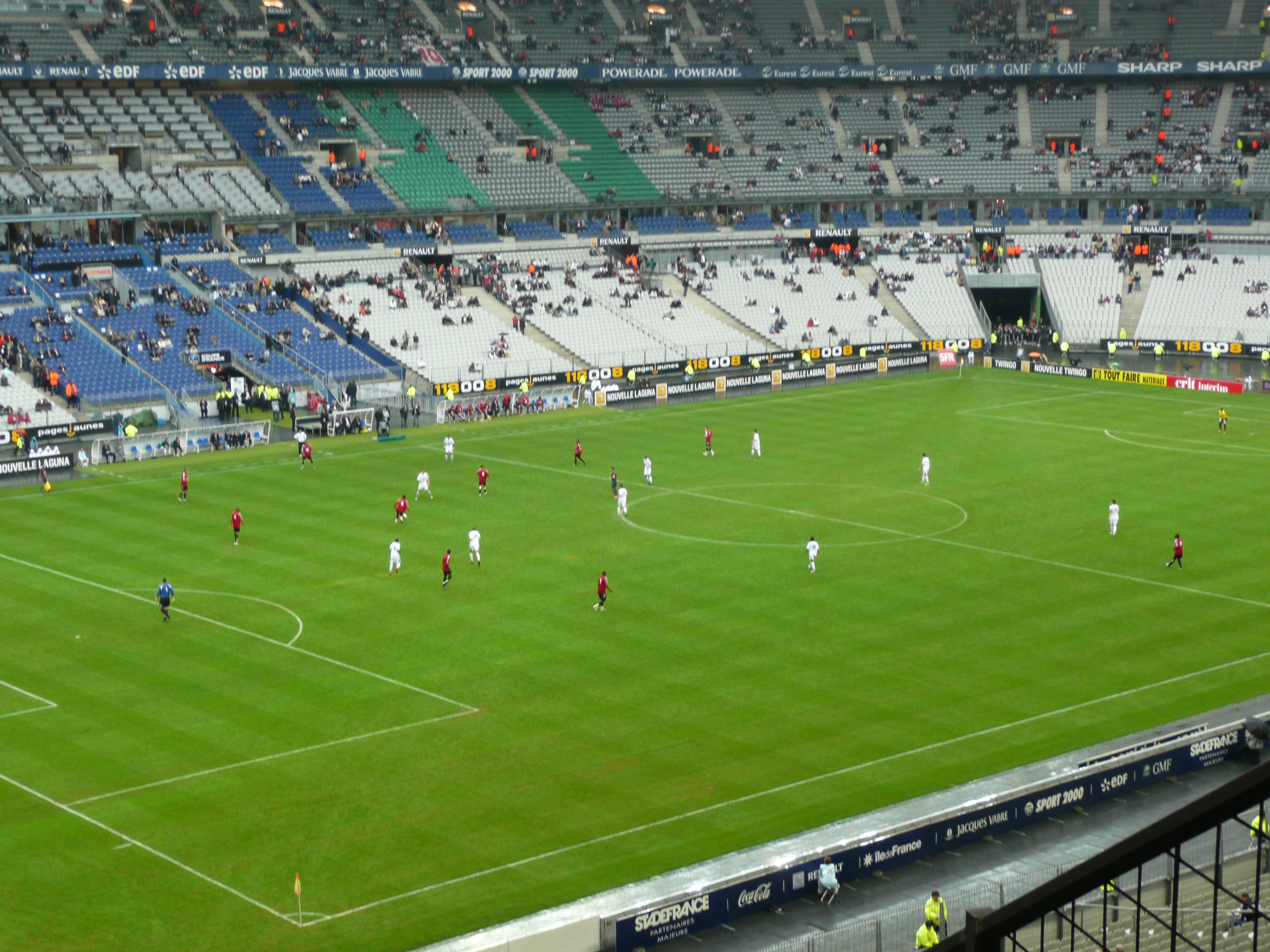
Scene from the 2007-2008 Coupe Gambardella final, won by Stade Rennais.

The progress made by the Rennes team was recognized nationally. Fourth in 2001, third in 2002, 2003, and 2004, and second in 2005, the training centre was ranked first in the rankings drawn up by the Direction Technique Nationale in 2006, 2007, 2008, 2009, 2010, and 2011, based on criteria assessing the place given to young players in the professional ranks (professional contracts signed and number of matches played), their presence in the French national teams, their academic success and the status of their instructors. On the pitch, this was reflected in a new Coupe Gambardella success in 2008, following on from the French 18-year-old championship title won a year earlier by the same generation of players. (Note: Eleven players took part in the two final victories: Petit, Souprayen, Le Marchand, Louhoungou, Théophile-Catherine, Brahimi, M'Vila, Lasimant, M'Laab, Le Tallec and Camara.)

However, the stated aim of the training centre's management was not to win titles but to upgrade young players as much as possible to bring them up to the level required to play in Ligue 1 as quickly as possible. In 2009, goalkeeper Abdoulaye Diallo made his professional debut at the age of seventeen but had already been training with the first-team squad a year earlier. At the European Under-19 Championship in 2010, he was also the only French player to be upgraded. Other objectives include the professionalization of the training structure, the individualization of training, the quest for greater precision and stringency in recruitment, and downsizing.

=== The red and black academy ===
In 2012, the Stade Rennais training centre fell back to second place in the national rankings, ahead of FC Sochaux-Montbéliard. This setback led to a reappraisal of the club's training work, and the appointment a year later of Yannick Menu as Patrick Rampillon's deputy director. In early 2014, Rampillon was replaced by Menu, who became the director of the training centre. During this period, Stade Rennais failed to regain the top spot in the training centre rankings, finishing sixth in 2013, second in 2014 behind Olympique Lyonnais, and sixth again in 2015.

The year 2015 is again synonymous with change: after having been an educator at the club, assistant to the professional squad managed by Pierre Dréossi, coach of several professional clubs, and finally director of the Stade Malherbe de Caen training centre, Landry Chauvin returns to Stade Rennais. He replaces Yannick Menu, who was ousted from his post. His arrival was accompanied by a reorganisation of the training centre's operations, which was renamed the “Académie Rouge et Noir,” and now includes the club's soccer academy and amateur section.

== Honours and awards ==
=== Achievements ===
Stade Rennais FC's youth teams have won various official and friendly competitions since the club was founded in 1901. The club's training centre was honored in 2006, 2007, 2008, 2009, 2010, and 2011 with first-place finishes in the French training centre rankings drawn up by the Direction Technique Nationale. In 2006, a study conducted by the Centre International d'étude du sport and the Centre d'étude et de recherche sur le sport et l'observation des territoires ranked Stade Rennais FC fifth out of 98 clubs in the German, English, Spanish, French, and Italian leagues, based on the number of club-trained players playing in these five leagues.

The following table lists the track record of Stade Rennais FC's youth teams, updated to June 2, 2018, in the various official competitions at the national level, as well as in some of the most prestigious friendly and seasonal tournaments.

Youth Teams Achievements of Stade Rennais FC
Official Competitions	Friendly and Seasonal Tournaments
Coupe Gambardella (3); Winner in 1973, 2003, and 2008.; Under-19 French Championship (1); Champion in 2019.; Under-17 French Championship (1); Champion in 2018.; Former Competitions: Coupe de France des espoirs (1); Winner in 1935.; Coupe nationale des juniors; Finalist in 1939.; French Professional Reserves Championship (2); Champion in 2004 and 2007.; Finalist in 2006.; Under-18 French Championship (1); Champion in 2007.; Under-17 French Championship (1); Champion in 2002; Under-15 French Championship; Finalist in 1997
Tournoi Carisport (4); Winner in 1993, 2000, 2006, and 2012.; Finalist in 1999.; Tournoi de Montaigu (7); Winner in 1999, 2003, 2010, 2014, 2016, 2017, and 2018.; Finalist in 1997, 2001, 2006, and 2009.; Ploufragan Training Centres Trophy (4); Winner in 2000, 2002, 2012, and 2013.; Finalist in 2005, 2008, and 2014.; Plougonvelin Tournament (8); Winner in 1994, 2002, 2004, 2006, 2010, 2011, 2013, and 2014.; Finalist in 1996, 2001, and 2007.

The match sheets below show the three Coupe Gambardella finals contested and won by Stade Rennais in 1973, 2003, and 2008.

=== In-house award ===
Since the early 1990s, at the end of each season, the training centre's teaching staff has awarded a prize to the best young player who has attended the centre. Not only are the player's qualities as footballer taken into account, but also their behavior and academic results. Since its creation, the trophy has rewarded several future professional footballers, including Mikaël Silvestre, Anthony Réveillère, Gaël Danic, Sylvain Marveaux and Jimmy Briand. In 2008, the trophy was awarded to Vincent Pajot, in 2009 to Quentin Rouger, in 2010 to Dimitri Foulquier, in 2011 to Axel Ngando, in 2012 to Adrien Hunou, and in 2013 to Maxime Étuin.

== Structures ==
=== Sports and educational facilities ===
==== Odorico Private Technical School ====
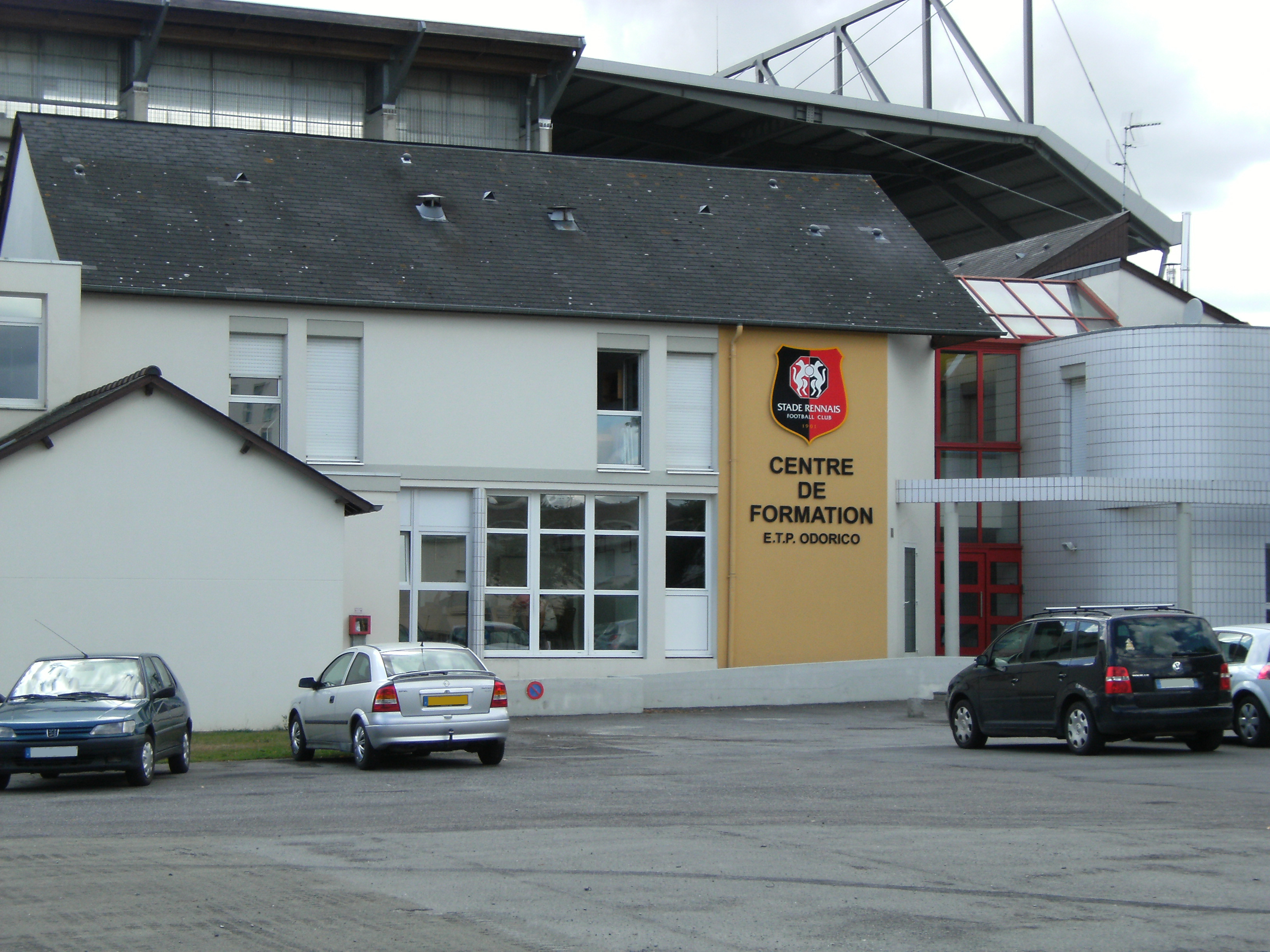
Odorico Private Technical School.

The Odorico Private Technical School provides accommodation and education for players trained at the club. Built-in 1987, its name pays homage to Isidore Odorico, a former player and manager of Stade Rennais—the driving force behind the club's adoption of professionalism in 1932—and president between 1933 and 1938. Located on rue du Moulin du Comte, near the Route de Lorient stadium, it includes classrooms, a restaurant, and boarding facilities. Home to thirty to forty players, ETP Odorico benefits from the presence of supervisory staff and twenty-two part-time teachers, who give around twenty hours of lessons a week to classes of no more than a dozen students.

==== Henri-Guérin training centre ====
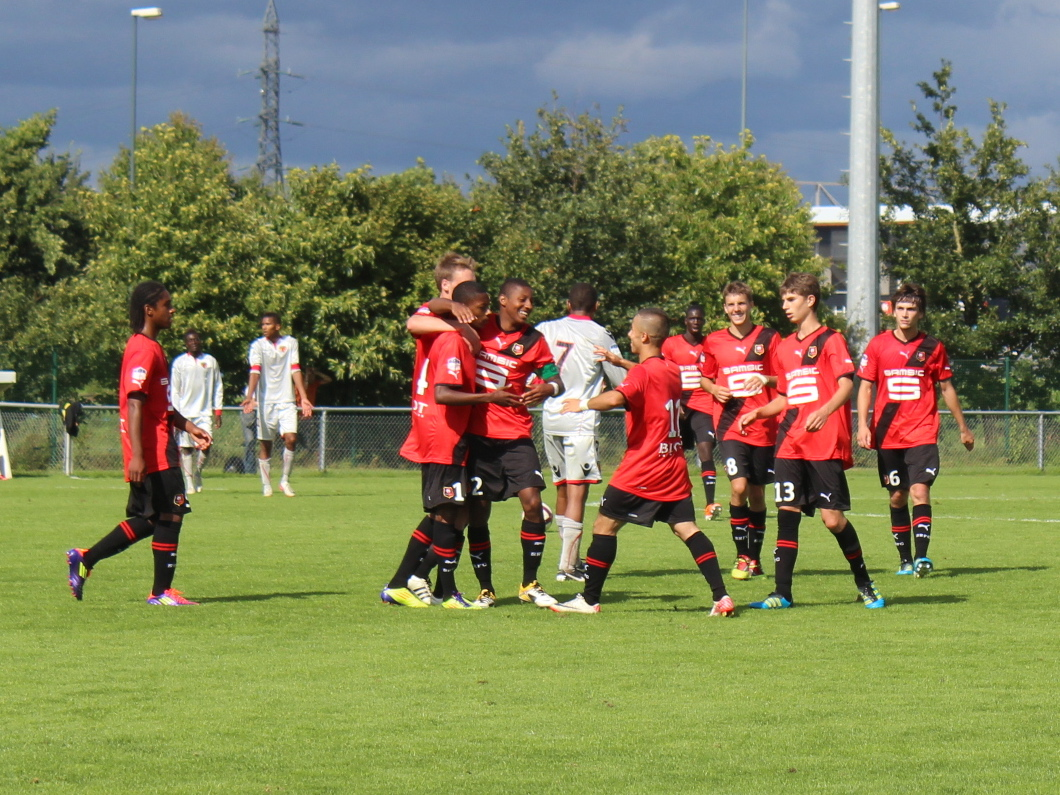
Under-19 players playing a championship match at the Henri-Guérin training centre.

The Henri-Guérin training centre is where the players' athletic and sporting development takes place. Since its inauguration in June 2000, the club's training centre has benefited from these facilities on an equal footing with the professionals. For some ten years before this, training took place at the Parc des Sports de la Route de Lorient, with a 45 x 25-metre synthetic surface installed at the same time as the ETP Odorico was built.

The Henri-Guérin training centre is used for youth team training, with six to eight sessions per week. A synthetic pitch, installed in 2007, is mainly used by the training centre, while several grass pitches are available to youngsters and their coaches. The training centre, approved by the French Football Federation as the Stade de la Piverdière, also hosts competitive matches for the training centre teams at weekends. In 2007, the club's reserve team won the French championship for professional reserves.

=== Legal and economic aspects ===
==== Administrative structure ====
The management of the training centre, its technical staff, trainers, medical staff, and recruitment team are all part of the Stade Rennais Football Club organization chart and are therefore dependent on the club. Schooling and accommodation, on the other hand, are dealt with separately.

In 1987, the construction of the Odorico private technical school was combined with the creation of the ETP Odorico association, to which the entire management of accommodation and schooling for young players was delegated. The association gives the training centre its legal personality, verifies and approves its accounts, purchases furniture, and teaching equipment, and has the power to amend its articles of association. The aim is also to limit costs for the club by obtaining grants and subsidies and developing partnerships. As an association, ETP Odorico has its president and director.

==== Organization chart ====
===== Sports and medical sector =====
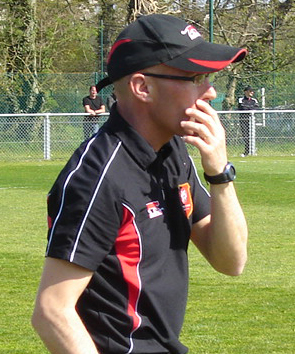
Landry Chauvin, director of the red and black academy.

The academy's director is Landry Chauvin. He has held this position since 2015 when he succeeded Loïc Kerbiriou, Michel Beaulieu, Patrick Rampillon, and Yannick Menu.

Several educators are in charge of training the players. Julien Stéphan is dedicated to the U-21 group. Pierre-Emmanuel Bourdeau, a former professional who trained at Stade Rennais, is in charge of the U19s, while Romain Ferrier, also a former professional, looks after the U17s. The technical staff is rounded out by Jérôme Hiaumet, former professional and goalkeeping coach, and Firmin Carré, physical trainer. The position of recruitment coordinator is held by Philippe Barraud, a former professional player trained at Stade Rennais. He heads up eight regional managers, who are themselves in charge of several observers. In all, some forty people work on recruiting young players throughout France.

The medical department is headed by Christian Le Coq, who also looks after the U19s. Doctors Stéphan, Le Gac, and Verdonck are responsible for the U23, U17 and U15 age groups respectively. The training centre also benefits from the services of two physiotherapists, Stéphane Logeais and Johann Fontaine.

===== ETP Odorico =====
Until the end of 2016, the president of the ETP Odorico association was Pierre Rochcongar,a doctor with the French national team between 1988 and 1993, with Stade Rennais for some 20 years, and director of the school until 2010. At that time, he succeeded Gérard Pourchet, who died on September 26, 2010, as mayor of Le Rheu between 1995 and 2001, and a former member of the Stade Rennais board. Gérard Pourchet himself succeeded Franck Viel in 2006 following the latter's death, who had held the presidency since 1991.

The director of the technical school is Jean-François Bigot, who succeeded Pierre Rochcongar in this role in 2010, and who previously held a position as professor of economics and social sciences at the ETP. Sébastien Crété is in charge of studies and life at the centre. Christophe Ronceray is the Director of Pedagogical Activities. The rest of the educational team consists of a centre life assistant, a psychologist, a secretary, a housekeeper, and five supervisors.

==== Budget and funding ====
From less than 10 million francs at the end of the 1990s, the budget for the Stade Rennais training centre rose sharply in line with that of the club, following the arrival of François Pinault as owner in 1998. In 2001, it amounted to 18 million francs. In the following years, it increased further, stabilizing at around 4 million euros, or around 10% of the club's total budget, with Ligue 1 clubs spending an average of 2.5 million euros on training.

The budget allocated to the training centre is supplemented by various partnerships and grants received by ETP Odorico. The association has signed an agreement with Crédit Mutuel de Bretagne, which paid 15,520 euros in 2005, and 16,000 euros in 2008 and 2011. ETP Odorico also receives public funding from time to time. In 1995, the Departmental Council of Ille-et-Vilaine allocated 500,000 francs in aid to professional sports. Several associations also support the school. Created by Abbé Detoc in 1978, at the time to provide economic support for the club in dire financial straits, the Club des 2000 has since provided regular assistance for school and educational activities at ETP Odorico. Founded in 1992, the Socios supporters' club also makes an annual financial contribution to the training centre. In 1995, the Socios donated 15,000 francs to the Rennes training centre.

==== Profitability of training policy ====
On August 15, 2024, the newspaper L'Équipe put a figure of 217 million euros on “the sum reaped (excluding bonuses) by Rennes from the sales of the most promising players from its training centre since 2016 (Dembélé, Gnagnon, Camawinga, Tel, Ugochukwu, Belocian, the Guéla brothers and Désiré Doué).” This reveals a particularly profitable training policy, supported by an effective negotiation strategy.

== Personalities ==
=== Managers and technical staff ===
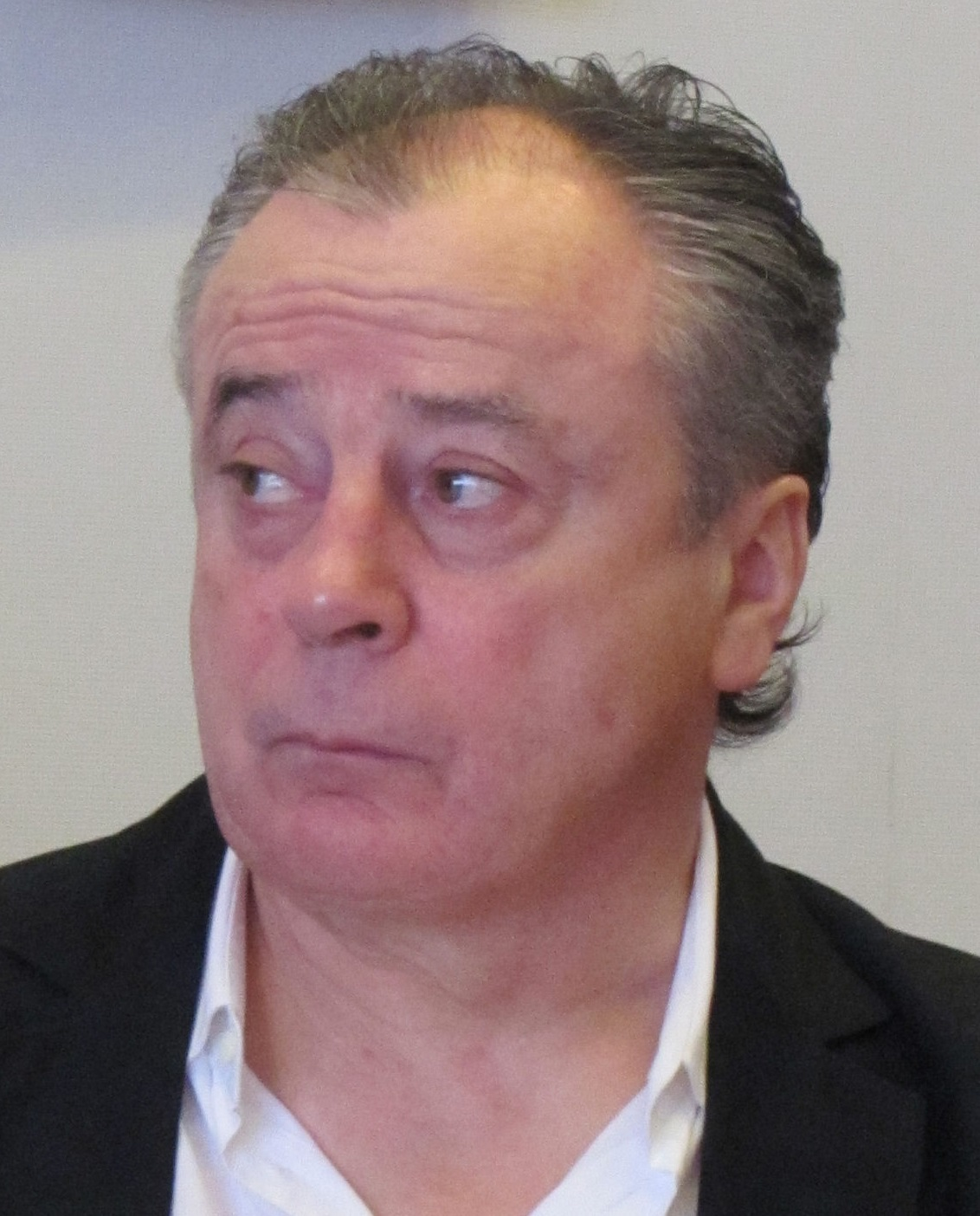
Bertrand Marchand, here in 2011, was an educator at the training centre before coaching professional clubs.

Ever since the Stade Rennais was founded in 1901, many technicians have been involved in training young players. In many cases, this role is a springboard to other responsibilities in the professional world or the management of the Rennes training system. Patrick Rampillon ended his playing career with Stade Rennais in 1983, becoming a trainer at the training centre. Three years later, Pierre Mosca's dismissal during the season led to Rampillon's appointment as interim coach from January to June 1987, but he decided not to continue in this role and became director of the training centre.

Like Rampillon, many youth team managers were promoted to the position of head coach at the whim of sporting events. In 1941, the war and the temporary departure of Jean Batmale prompted Louis Bonneville to take charge of the first team for a season, assisted by player Émile Scharwath. In 1975, the dismissal of René Cédolin prompted Frédo Garel, coach of the youth and amateur teams, to step in for two games. Internal promotion subsequently became a fully-fledged choice of the club's directors. In 1976, Claude Dubaële was promoted to head of the professionals. A year and a half later, Alain Jubert followed suit, after Dubaële was dismissed for economic reasons. Finally, Yves Colleu, who had become an assistant coach after joining the technical staff at the training centre, became the club's head coach, replacing Michel Le Milinaire, who was forced to retire. Only staying on for the 1996-1997 season, he subsequently became Paul Le Guen's appointed assistant coach, following the latter throughout his career.

Like Colleu, some other technicians took advantage of their experience at the training centre to launch their coaching careers. Such was the case of Bertrand Marchand, who, after a year as assistant coach to Christian Gourcuff, was promoted to head coach of En Avant de Guingamp in Ligue 1. This was also the case for Landry Chauvin, coach in charge of training from 1992 to 2007, who became assistant coach to Pierre Dréossi for six months before taking charge of the CS Sedan-Ardennes professional team, followed by FC Nantes and Stade Brestois. More specialized technicians also experienced similar trajectories. Goalkeeping coach Christophe Lollichon joined the technical staff of the training centre in 1999 and was promoted to the first team in 2003. Four years later, he was recruited by Chelsea FC.

Many of the technicians who have been involved in youth team coaching have in common the fact that they were once players at the club or even former residents of the academy themselves. The cultivation of a “club spirit” is also one of the stated objectives, as is the respect by instructors for certain values to be passed on to young players. A guiding principle that enables the training centre to cultivate its identity, with close collaboration between technicians, and a common game plan for its various teams.

=== Players ===
==== Recruitment policy ====
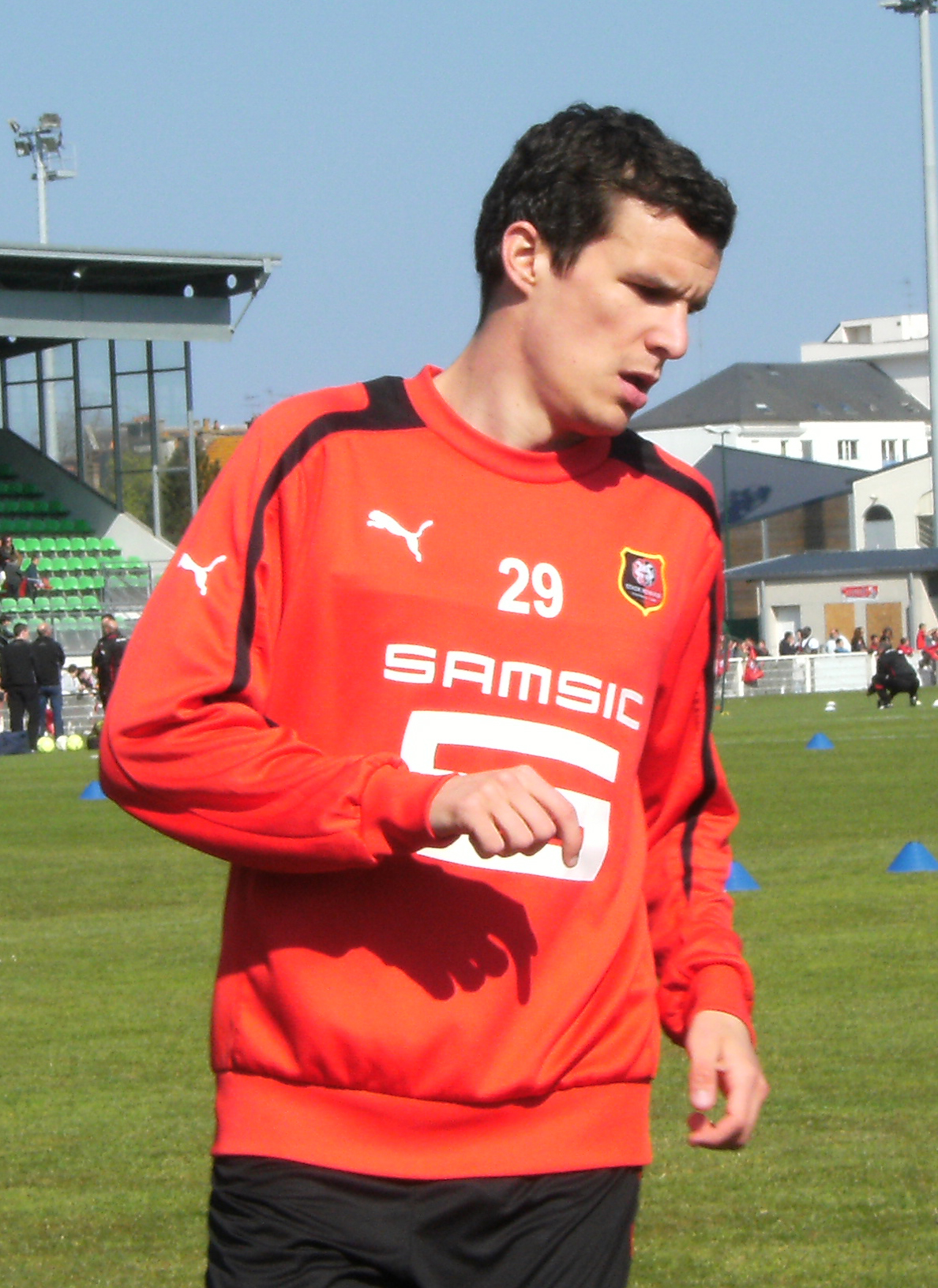
Romain Danzé, born in Douarnenez, is one of the Breton players trained at Stade Rennais.

At the end of the 1970s, and even more so after the creation of the ETP Odorico in 1987, the introduction of a boarding school made it possible to broaden recruitment to young players not based in Rennes. However, the core of the training centre's recruitment remained Breton: in 2001, two-thirds of the players were from the region. Several of them went on to become professionals, including Étienne Didot born in Paimpol, Yoann Gourcuff born in Plœmeur, Romain Danzé born in Douarnenez, Sylvain Marveaux born in Vannes, and Laurent Huard and Fabien Lemoine, both born in Fougères. In 2010, 70% of the forty-three players at the training centre came from within a 200-kilometer radius of Rennes. Eighteen of them come from Ille-et-Vilaine and twenty-five from Brittany.

However, the players' origins quickly spread to the rest of France, and in particular to the Paris region. Born in Neuilly-sur-Marne, Sylvain Wiltord was playing for RC Joinville when he was spotted by Stade Rennais in 1991. Like other French professional clubs, since the mid-1990s Stade Rennais has regularly recruited players from the Île-de-France region who have come through the pre-training program at the Clairefontaine National Soccer Institute: Jimmy Briand, Jacques Faty, Jirès Kembo-Ekoko and Yacine Brahimi are all examples. In 2008, the variety of regions of origin of the fourteen players who took part in the Coupe Gambardella final shows the multiplicity of recruitment zones: three players came from Brittany, four from Île-de-France, and two from Haute-Normandie. The other five players come from the Lille region, the Lyon region, Amiens, Besançon, and Pau. (Note: Maxime Le Marchand hails from Saint-Malo, Kévin Théophile-Catherine from Saint-Brieuc and Gaëtan Caro from Léhon; Yacine Brahimi, David Louhoungou and Yoan Pivaty come from INF Clairefontaine, Vincent Pajot from Val-d'Oise; Damien Le Tallec played in the youth teams of Le Havre AC when he was recruited by Stade Rennais, Florent Petit in the Rouen region; finally, Abdoul Razzagui Camara played for Fives, Samuel Souprayen for Oullins, Yann M'Vila for Amiens SC, Yohann Lasimant for Besançon RC and Hicham M'Laab for Pau FC.)

The training centre also occasionally brings in foreign players. In 2000, Gabonese players Stéphane N'Guéma and Fabrice Do Marcolino were spotted by Stade Rennais at the Montaigu Tournament, where both played for their national team. In 2003, Cameroonian Stéphane Mbia was recruited. A former member of the Kadji Sports Academy in Douala, he turned professional two years later. Two Swedish players of African descent also passed through the centre. Nadir Benchenaa was recruited by Stade Rennais in 2001 and stayed for two years, winning the 2003 Coupe Gambardella in the process. Gambian-born Mohamed Jallow-Mbye signed for Stade Rennais in 2007 from Hammarby but only stayed a year before returning to Sweden. The integration of more young foreign players in the future is one of the avenues being explored by the management of the training centre.

Recruitment by the training centre is based on three fundamental criteria: the player's technique, i.e. how he expresses himself with the ball at his feet; the player's intelligence, i.e. how he perceives the game, whether or not he has the ball; and finally, reliability, i.e. respect for others, a sense of team spirit, generosity of effort, a sense of competition and, in general, the player's personality.

==== International players ====
===== French national team =====
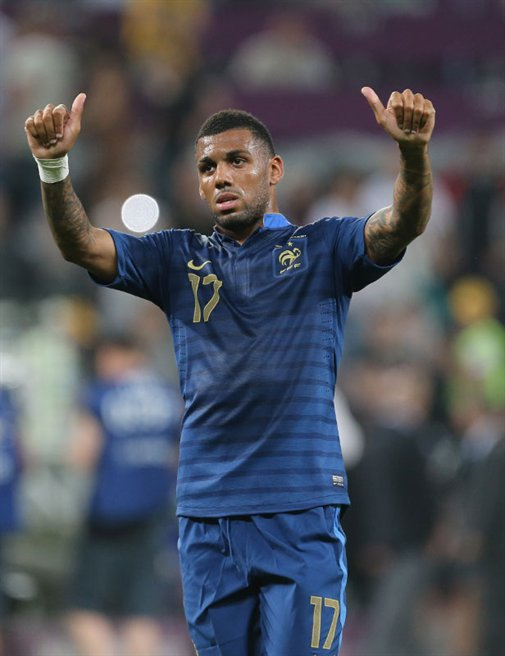
Yann M'Vila joins the French team after training at Stade Rennais.

Before the training centre was set up, three players who passed through the club's youth teams were selected for the French national soccer team. The first was Jean Prouff, who took out his first license with the club in 1933, at the age of 14. Between 1946 and 1949, he played seventeen matches in the blue jersey. In 1965, Pierrick Hiard joined the club's soccer academy at the age of 10. He completed his entire training there until leaving in December 1977. He was selected once for the French national team, in 1981. Patrick Delamontagne, who had previously played for La Bouëxière, the town of his birth, joined the Stade Rennais youth teams in 1974, at the age of 17. He won three caps for Les Bleus between 1981 and 1987.

Since the creation of the training centre in the late 1970s, several players trained at the club have gone on to achieve international status. Their numbers increased particularly after 1987, with the creation of the Odorico private technical school. Among them, Sylvain Wiltord is the player to have played the most games for the French national team, with 92 caps between 1999 and 2006. He was crowned European champion in 2000 and contested the 2006 World Cup final alongside another club-trained player, Mikaël Silvestre, who made his debut for Les Bleus two years before his former team-mate Ousmane Dabo. In 2010, four Stade Rennais-trained players made it into the French national team: Jimmy Briand, Yoann Gourcuff, Yann M'Vila, and Anthony Réveillère.

Ousmane Dembélé is the only player to have won a World Cup, in 2018. He was also a finalist in the 2022 edition, along with Eduardo Camavinga.

The following table shows the current list of Stade Rennais-trained players in the French national team as of July 07, 2023, along with their year of birth, number of caps, and the corresponding period. Players whose international careers are still in progress are shown in bold type.

Players from the French National Team Trained at Stade Rennais
Player	Generation	Period	Caps
Jean Prouff	1919	1946-1949	17
Pierrick Hiard	1955	1981	1
Patrick Delamontagne	1957	1981-1987	3
Sylvain Wiltord	1974	1999-2006	92
Mikaël Silvestre	1977	2001–2006	40
Ousmane Dabo	1977	2003	3
Anthony Réveillère	1979	2003–2012	18
Jimmy Briand	1985	2008–2010	5
Yoann Gourcuff	1986	2008–2013	31
Yann M'Vila	1990	2010–2012	22
Tiémoué Bakayoko	1994	2017	1
**Ousmane Dembélé**	**1997**	**2016–**	**55**
**Eduardo Camavinga**	**2002**	**2020–**	**26**
Adrien Truffert	2001	2022	1
**Désiré Doué**	**2005**	**2025–**	**1**
**Total**		**1946-**	**277**

===== Foreign national teams =====
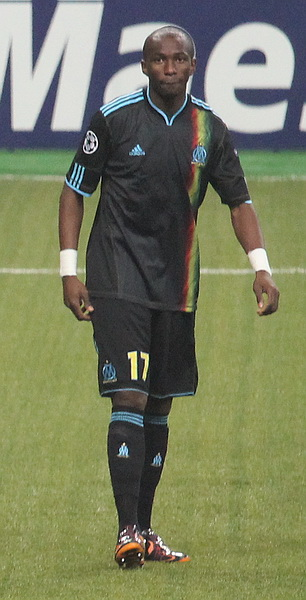
Stéphane Mbia, trained at Stade Rennais and member of the Cameroonian national team.

Several players from the training centre represent a country other than France during their careers. These are players with a nationality other than French, or players who have decided to represent the country of their ancestors. Many African national teams include players trained at Stade Rennais. Stéphane Mbia, trained at the club from 17, joined the Cameroon team in 2006, and played for his country at the 2010 World Cup. The Senegal team also features many players trained at Stade Rennais, many of whom were born in France. These include Jacques Faty and Moussa Sow, who previously played for the French national team at the youth level, as well as Jackson Mendy. Amadou Maktar N'Diaye and Papakouli Diop, both born in Senegal but trained at Stade Rennais, also play for their national teams, the former playing in the 2002 World Cup.

Other players trained at Stade Rennais represent African countries at international level. These include Alan Do Marcolino, Fabrice Do Marcolino, and Stéphane N'Guéma with Gabon, Jonathan Bru with Mauritius, Mohamed Jallow-Mbye with the Gambia, and David Louhoungou and Prince Oniangue with the Republic of Congo.

=== Current workforce and technical staff ===
==== Espoirs team ====
The Stade Rennais U23 team, coached by Pierre-Emmanuel Bourdeau, competes in the French National 3 Championship. It is mainly made up of players born between 2002 and 2007. Players born in 2005 and 2006 are also likely to play in the U19 national championship and those born in 2007 in the U17 national championship.

2023-2024 Squad of Stade Rennais FC Reserve Team
No.	Player	Position	Date of birth	Age	Nationality (Note: Only the sporting nationality is indicated. A player may have several nationalities, but may only play for one national team.)	Selections (Note: Only the most important selection is shown.)	Previous club
	Yann Batola	G	26 January 2004	19	France	France -18	Formed at the club
	Matthys Silistrie	G	16 September 2005	18	France		Formed at the club
	Rayan Bamba	D	14 May 2004	19	France		Formed at the club
	Cyril Borval	D			France		Formed at the club
	Jonathan Do Marcolino	D	10 May 2006	17	France	France -16	Formed at the club
	Maurice Ngangué	D	26 May 2005	18	France		Formed at the club
	Yaël Thébault	D	26 February 2007	16	France	France -17	Formed at the club
	Mohamed Jaouab	D	14 May 2002	21	Morocco	Morocco - U23	Académie Mohammed VI
	Mahamadou Aboubacar Nagida	D	28 June 2005	18	Cameroon		Formed at the club
	Léo Rouillé	D	9 February 2004	19	France		Formed at the club
	Gabriel Tutu	D	29 January 2004	19	France		Formed at the club
	Paolo Limon	M	5 December 2005	18	France		Stade Briochin
	Djaoui Cissé	M	31 January 2004	19	France		Formed at the club
	José Capon	M	3 May 2003	20	France		Racing Club de Lens
	Joël-Emmanuel Coulibaly	M	11 May 2007	16	France	France -17	Formed at the club
	Djibril Diallo	M	25 June 2006	17	France		Formed at the club
	Nordan Mukiele	M	12 February 2006	17	France		Formed at the club
	Amadou Diallo	A	13 July 2006	17	Gabon	1	Formed at the club
	Kelian Baruti	A	22 November 2005	18	France		Formed at the club
	Noah Le Bret-Maboulou	A	16 January 2005	18	France		Formed at the club
	Wilson Samaké	A	30 March 2004	19	France	France -18	Formed at the club
Manager: Pierre-Emmanuel Bourdeau
Official Squad List

==== Under-19 squad ====
The Stade Rennais U19 team competes in the national U19 championship and is coached by Sébastien Tambouret. The squad is mainly made up of players born in 2005 and 2006, but the national under-19 championship is also open to players born in 2007, 2008, and 2009. However, prior medical clearance is required for the latter year of birth.

2023–2024 Stade Rennais FC U19 Team Roster
No.	First Name	Last Name	Position	Date of birth	Nationality (Note: Only the sporting nationality is indicated. A player may have several nationalities, but may only play for one national team.)	Previous club	International caps (Note: Only the most important selection is shown.)
	Kilian	Belazzoug	G	18 July 2006	France	Formed at the club
	Théo	Collin	G	16 June 2006	France	Formed at the club	France U16
	Kylian	Dumenil	D	4 August 2006	France	Formed at the club
	Yoan	Akwa Dzou	D	1 April 2007	France	Formed at the club
	Junior	Aké	D	15 March 2007	France	Formed at the club
	Isiaka	Soukouna	D	27 February 2006	France	Formed at the club
	Dorian	Fraeyman	D	7 February 2006	France	Formed at the club
	Pacôme	Marquet	D	29 January 2007	France	Formed at the club
	Issa	Habri	D	6 January 2006	France	Formed at the club
	Jeanslor	Kiese Lundoloka	D	19 May 2007	France	Formed at the club
	Florian	Truffert	M	5 June 2006	France	Formed at the club
	Brieuc	Betin	M	Unknown	France	Formed at the club
	Samuel	Ledain	M	14 December 2007	France	Formed at the club
	Jibril	El Baraka	M	23 February 2007	Morocco	Formed at the club
	Jules	Duvail	M	12 March 2006	France	Formed at the club
	Valentin	Taramelli	M	11 July 2006	France	Formed at the club
	Steeve	Mvodo Mvodo	A	22 March 2007	France	Formed at the club
	Mervin	Gbeme	A	23 April 2007	France	Formed at the club
	Mohamed Kader	Meïté	A	11 October 2007	France	Formed at the club	France U17
	Lucas	Rosier	A	12 March 2007	France	Formed at the club
	Henrick	Do Marcolino	A	Unknown	France	Formed at the club
	Kelvin	Dongopandji	A	19 February 2007	France	Formed at the club
	Flavien	Soumenat	A	3 January 2006	France	Formed at the club
Head coach: Sébastien Tambouret; Assistant: William Stanger

==== Under-17 squad ====
The Stade Rennais U17 team competes in the national championship for this category and is coached by Laurent Viaud. The squad is made up of players born in 2007 and 2008, but the national U17 championship is also open to players born in 2009, subject to medical clearance.

Stade Rennais FC U17 Team - 2023-2024 Season
N°	First name	Last name	Position	Date of birth	Nationality	Teams
	Maïdy	Salin	Goalkeeper	March 2, 2008	France
	Maxence	Metayer	Goalkeeper	May 7, 2008	France
	Noé	Lepage	Goalkeeper	Unknown	France
	Alexis	Ramel	Defender	Unknown	France
	Antoine	Vauléon	Defender	Unknown	France
	Ruben	Lomet	Defender	August 20, 2008	France	France -16
	Chibuike	Ugochukwu	Defender	July 27, 2008	France	France -16
	Alexis	Fernandes	Defender	Unknown	France
	Rio	Saint-Surin	Defender	Unknown	France
	Alexis	Bernard	Midfielder	February 12, 2008	France
	Kossi	Comlan	Midfielder	February 25, 2007	France
	Daniel	Antonio	Midfielder	March 13, 2008	France
	Yaya	Camara	Midfielder	Unknown	France
	Lorys	Jagu	Midfielder	June 9, 2008	France
	Mehdi	Husson	Midfielder	June 27, 2008	France
	Baptiste	Nsiala-Makengo	Midfielder	Unknown	France
	Diego	Coutadeur	Midfielder	August 21, 2007	France
	Elias Alexander	Legendre	Striker	Unknown	France
	Melvin	Jambry	Striker	Unknown	France
	Boukary	Coulibaly	Striker	Unknown	France
	Kenny	Assignon	Striker	Unknown	France
	Mohamed	Chebbi	Striker	January 5, 2008	France	France -16
	Erwan Idrisse	Traoré	Striker	May 21, 2008	France

Technical staff
Position	Name
Coach	Laurent Viaud

== See also ==
- History of Stade Rennais FC
- Stade Rennais FC in European football

== Bibliography ==
- Loire, Claude (1994). Le Stade rennais, fleuron du football breton 1901-1991 [Stade Rennais, the jewel of Breton football 1901-1991] (in French). Rennes: Éditions Apogée. p. 488. ISBN 2-909275-40-X.
- Loire, Claude (1997). Le Stade rennais, fleuron du football breton, volume II : 1991-1997 [Stade Rennais, the jewel of Breton football, volume II: 1991-1997] (in French). Rennes: Éditions Apogée. p. 104. ISBN 2-84398-000-3.
- Loire, Claude; Charbonneau, Virginie (2001). Stade rennais FC, 100 ans en rouge et noir, l'album du centenaire [Stade Rennais FC, 100 years in red and black, the centenary album] (in French). Rennes: Éditions Apogée. p. 123. ISBN 2-84398-107-7.
- Collectif (2001). "100 ans en Rouge et Noir : L'Histoire du Stade rennais" [100 years in Red and Black: The History of Stade Rennais]. Hors-série Ouest-France (in French): 64.
