= Pineault =

Pineault (French pronunciation: [pi.no]) is a surname that originates from France. Notable people with the surname include:

- Adam Pineault (born 1986), American ice hockey player
- Alicia Pineault (born 1999), Canadian figure skater

== See also ==
- Pinault
- Pineau, French aperitif
