= Stade Rennais FC in European football =

French club in European football

- Club: Stade Rennais FC
- First entry: 1965–66 European Cup Winners' Cup
- Latest entry: 2026–27 UEFA Europa League

This is the list of all Stade Rennais FC's European matches.

== Overall record ==
Accurate as of 4 November 2026

Competition	Played	Won	Drew	Lost	GF	GA	GD	Win%
Cup Winners' Cup	4	0	2	2	1	4	−3	0.00
UEFA Champions League	6	0	1	5	3	11	−8	0.00
UEFA Cup / UEFA Europa League	63	25	14	24	90	87	+3	39.68
UEFA Europa Conference League	10	7	2	1	20	11	+9	70.00
UEFA Intertoto Cup	16	6	3	7	24	21	+3	37.50
Total	99	38	22	39	138	134	+4	38.38

Legend: GF = Goals For. GA = Goals Against. GD = Goal Difference.

== Results ==
Season	Competition	Round	Opponent	Home	Away	Aggregate
1965–66	European Cup Winners' Cup	First round	(Czechoslovakia) Dukla Prague	0–0	0–2	0–2
1971–72	European Cup Winners' Cup	First round	(Scotland) Rangers	1–1	0–1	1–2
1996	UEFA Intertoto Cup	Group 6	(Israel) Hapoel Tel Aviv	—N/a	2–0	4th place
1996	UEFA Intertoto Cup	Group 6	(Switzerland) Luzern	1–2	—N/a	4th place
1996	UEFA Intertoto Cup	Group 6	(Croatia) Segesta	—N/a	2–2	4th place
1996	UEFA Intertoto Cup	Group 6	(Sweden) Örgryte	1–2	—N/a	4th place
1999	UEFA Intertoto Cup	Third round	Austria Lustenau	1–0	1–2	2–2 (a)
1999	UEFA Intertoto Cup	Semi-finals	Austria Wien	2–0	2–2	4–2
1999	UEFA Intertoto Cup	Finals	(Italy) Juventus	2–2	0–2	2–4
2001	UEFA Intertoto Cup	Third round	(Czech Republic) Synot	5–0	2–4	7–4
2001	UEFA Intertoto Cup	Semi-finals	(England) Aston Villa	2–1	0–1	2–2 (a)
2005–06	UEFA Cup	First round	(Spain) Osasuna	3–1	0–0	3–1
2005–06	UEFA Cup	Group G	(Germany) VfB Stuttgart	—N/a	0–2	5th place
2005–06	UEFA Cup	Group G	(Romania) Rapid București	0–2	—N/a	5th place
2005–06	UEFA Cup	Group G	(Ukraine) Shakhtar Donetsk	—N/a	0–1	5th place
2005–06	UEFA Cup	Group G	(Greece) PAOK	1–5	—N/a	5th place
2007–08	UEFA Cup	First round	(Bulgaria) Lokomotiv Sofia	1–2	3–1	4–3
2007–08	UEFA Cup	Group D	(Switzerland) Basel	—N/a	0–1	5th place
2007–08	UEFA Cup	Group D	(Norway) Brann	1–1	—N/a	5th place
2007–08	UEFA Cup	Group D	(Germany) Hamburger SV	—N/a	0–3	5th place
2007–08	UEFA Cup	Group D	(Croatia) Dinamo Zagreb	1–1	—N/a	5th place
2008	UEFA Intertoto Cup	Third round	(Ukraine) Tavriya Simferopol	1–0	0–1 (a.e.t.)	1–1 (10–9 p)
2008–09	UEFA Cup	Second qualifying round	(Norway) Stabæk	2–0	1–2	3–2
2008–09	UEFA Cup	First round	(Netherlands) Twente	2–1	0–1	2–2 (a)
2011–12	UEFA Europa League	Third qualifying round	(Georgia (country)) Metalurgi Rustavi	2–0	5–2	7–2
2011–12	UEFA Europa League	Play-off round	(Serbia) Red Star Belgrade	4–0	2–1	6–1
2011–12	UEFA Europa League	Group I	(Italy) Udinese	0–0	1–2	4th place
2011–12	UEFA Europa League	Group I	(Spain) Atlético Madrid	1–1	1–3	4th place
2011–12	UEFA Europa League	Group I	(Scotland) Celtic	1–1	1–3	4th place
2018–19	UEFA Europa League	Group K	(Czech Republic) Jablonec	2–1	1–0	2nd place
2018–19	UEFA Europa League	Group K	(Kazakhstan) Astana	2–0	0–2	2nd place
2018–19	UEFA Europa League	Group K	(Ukraine) Dynamo Kyiv	1–2	1–3	2nd place
2018–19	UEFA Europa League	Round of 32	(Spain) Real Betis	3–3	3–1	6–4
2018–19	UEFA Europa League	Round of 16	(England) Arsenal	3–1	0–3	3–4
2019–20	UEFA Europa League	Group E	(Italy) Lazio	2–0	1–2	4th place
2019–20	UEFA Europa League	Group E	(Scotland) Celtic	1–1	1–3	4th place
2019–20	UEFA Europa League	Group E	(Romania) CFR Cluj	0–1	0–1	4th place
2020–21	UEFA Champions League	Group E	(Spain) Sevilla	1–3	0–1	4th place
2020–21	UEFA Champions League	Group E	(England) Chelsea	1–2	0–3	4th place
2020–21	UEFA Champions League	Group E	(Russia) Krasnodar	1–1	0–1	4th place
2021–22	UEFA Europa Conference League	Play-off round	(Norway) Rosenborg	2–0	3–1	5–1
2021–22	UEFA Europa Conference League	Group G	(England) Tottenham Hotspur	2–2	3–0 (awd.)	1st place
2021–22	UEFA Europa Conference League	Group G	(Netherlands) Vitesse	3–3	2–1	1st place
2021–22	UEFA Europa Conference League	Group G	(Slovenia) Mura	1–0	2–1	1st place
2021–22	UEFA Europa Conference League	Round of 16	(England) Leicester City	2–1	0–2	2–3
2022–23	UEFA Europa League	Group B	(Cyprus) AEK Larnaca	1–1	2–1	2nd place
2022–23	UEFA Europa League	Group B	(Turkey) Fenerbahçe	2–2	3–3	2nd place
2022–23	UEFA Europa League	Group B	(Ukraine) Dynamo Kyiv	2–1	1–0	2nd place
2022–23	UEFA Europa League	Knockout round play-offs	(Ukraine) Shakhtar Donetsk	2–1 (a.e.t.)	1–2	3–3 (4–5 p)
2023–24	UEFA Europa League	Group F	(Israel) Maccabi Haifa	3–0	3–0	2nd place
2023–24	UEFA Europa League	Group F	(Spain) Villarreal	2–3	0–1	2nd place
2023–24	UEFA Europa League	Group F	(Greece) Panathinaikos	3–1	2–1	2nd place
2023–24	UEFA Europa League	Knockout round play-offs	(Italy) Milan	3–2	0–3	3–5
2026–27	UEFA Europa League	League phase	(Austria) Sturm Graz	—N/a	0–0	
2026–27	UEFA Europa League	League phase	(Greece) OFI	2–1	—N/a	
2026–27	UEFA Europa League	League phase	(Italy) Juventus	—N/a	2–2	
2026–27	UEFA Europa League	League phase	(Greece) Olympiacos	0–0	—N/a	
2026–27	UEFA Europa League	League phase	(Netherlands) NEC	—N/a		
2026–27	UEFA Europa League	League phase	(Croatia) Dinamo Zagreb		—N/a	
2026–27	UEFA Europa League	League phase	(Cyprus) Omonia		—N/a	
2026–27	UEFA Europa League	League phase	(Czech Republic) Sparta Prague	—N/a		

== See also ==
- Stade Rennais FC
- Stade Rennais FC Training Centre
