= Pinault =

Pinault (French pronunciation: [pi.no]) is a surname. Notable people with the surname include:

- Clément Pinault (1985–2009), French football defender
- François Pinault (born 1936), French businessman
- François-Henri Pinault (born 1962), French businessman, son of François Pinault and husband of actress Salma Hayek
- Georges-Jean Pinault (born 1955), French linguist
- Henri Pinault (1904–1987), Bishop of Chengdu
- Thomas Pinault (born 1981), French professional footballer

== See also ==
- Pinault's law in linguistics
- Pineau, a French aperitif
- Pineault
