= Patrick Rampillon =

French footballer (born 1955)

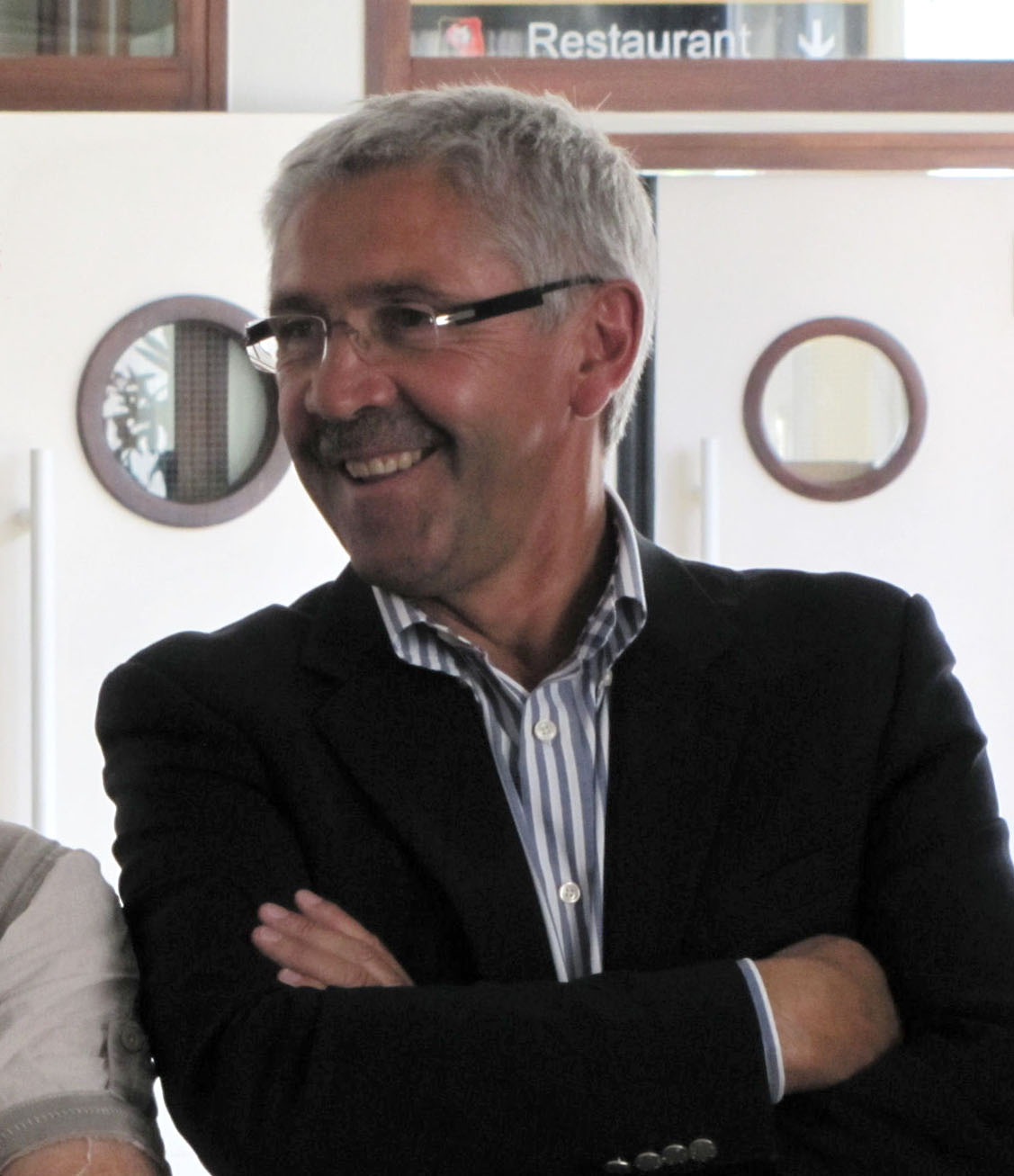

Personal information
- Date of birth: 4 July 1955 (age 71)
- Place of birth: Bressuire, France
- Height: 1.77 m (5 ft 10 in)
- Position: Midfielder

Senior career*
Years	Team	Apps	(Gls)
1975–1976	SO Cholet		
1976–1978	Reims		
1978–1979	Saint-Étienne		
1979–1983	Rennes		

Managerial career
- 1987: Rennes
- * Club domestic league appearances and goals

Patrick Rampillon (born 4 July 1955) is a retired French football player who played for SO Cholet, Stade Reims, AS Saint-Étienne and Rennes.

After retiring as a player, Rampillon enjoyed a career as a coach at Rennes youth academy. He managed the first team in 1987, then became the academy's director.
