= Jean Prouff =

French footballer (1919–2008)

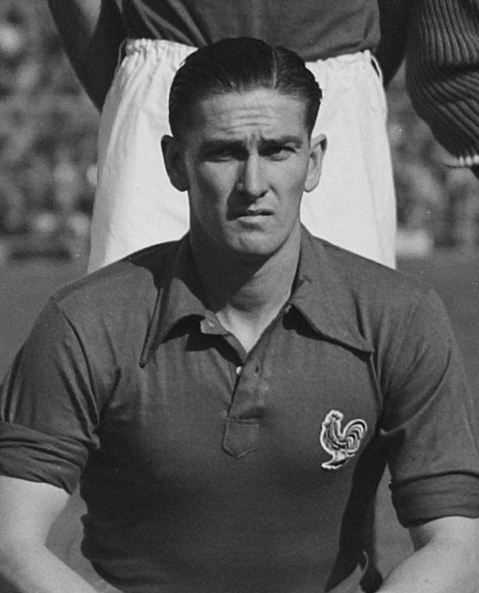
- Prouff in 1949

Personal information
- Date of birth: 12 September 1919
- Place of birth: Peillac, Morbihan, France
- Date of death: 12 February 2008 (aged 88)
- Place of death: Peillac, Morbihan, France
- Position: Midfielder

Senior career*
Years	Team	Apps	(Gls)
1936–1938	Saint-Pierre de Nantes		
1938–1939	SC Fives		
1942–1943	SC Fives		
1943–1948	Rennes		
1948–1949	Reims		
1950	Rouen		
1950–1952	Rennes		
1952–1953	Caen		
1953–1954	AS Aix		

International career
1946–1949	France	17	(1)

Managerial career
- 1952–1953: Caen
- 1953–1954: AS Aix
- 1955–1956: Guingamp
- 1956–1958: Boulogne
- 1958–1959: Red Star
- 1960: Poland
- 1960: Gabon
- 1961: RES Philippeville
- 1962–1963: Standard de Liège
- 1963–1964: Reims
- 1964–1971: Rennes
- 1973–1976: US Berné
- * Club domestic league appearances and goals

Jean Prouff (12 September 1919 – 12 February 2008) was a French football player and manager who played as a midfielder.

== Honours ==
=== As a player ===
Reims

- Division 1: 1949

=== As a coach ===
Standard de Liège

- Belgian League: 1963

Rennes

- Coupe de France: 1965, 1971
