= Laurent Huard =

French footballer, coach, and manager (born 1973)

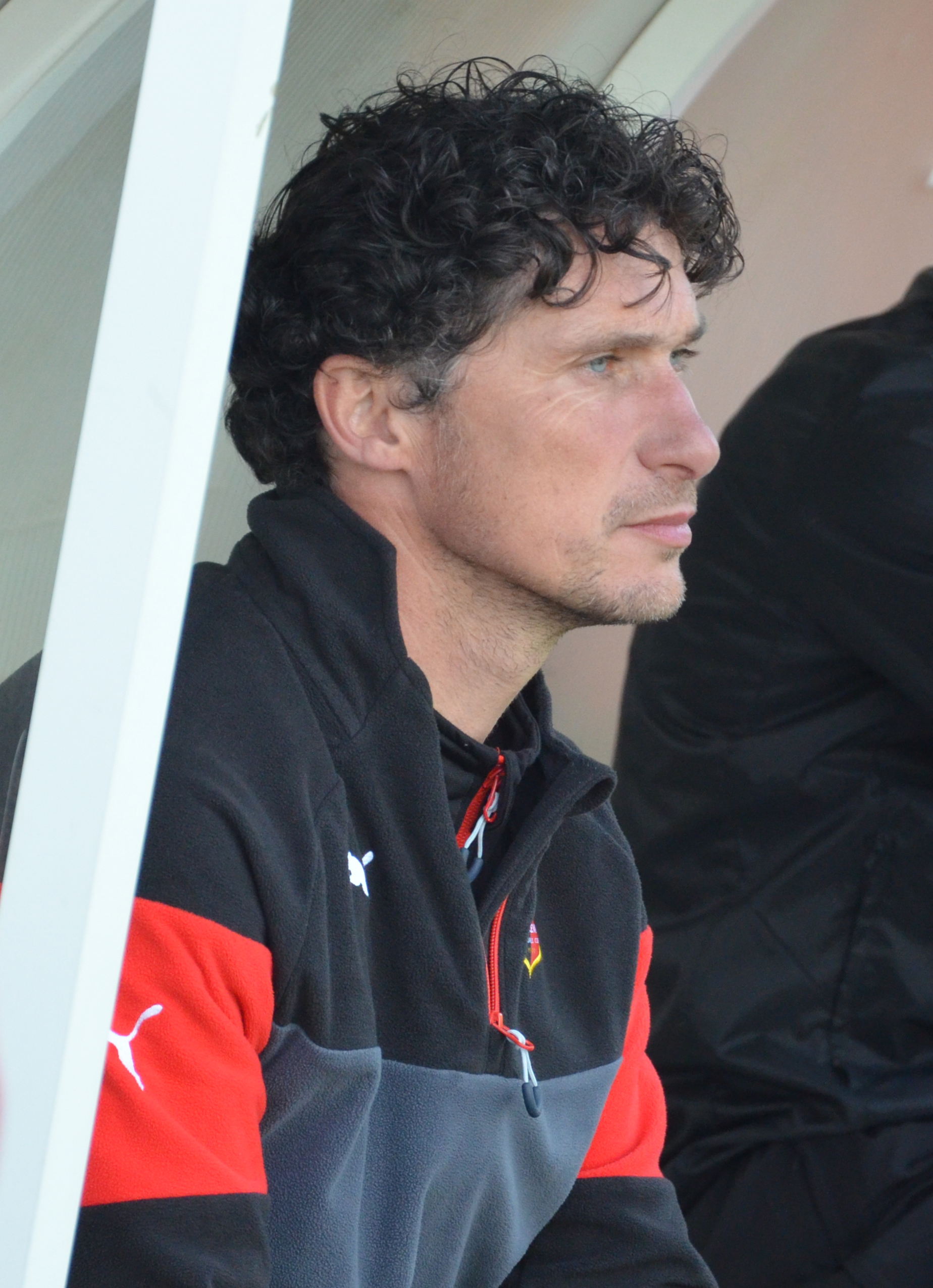
- Huard in 2015

Personal information
- Date of birth: 26 August 1973 (age 53)
- Place of birth: Fougères, France
- Height: 1.72 m (5 ft 8 in)
- Position: Midfielder

Team information
- Current team: Saint-Étienne (academy coach)

Senior career*
Years	Team	Apps	(Gls)
1990–1999	Rennes	196	(14)
1999–2000	Sedan	31	(2)
2000–2002	Saint-Étienne	49	(4)
Total		276	(20)

Managerial career
- 2003–2006: Rennes (U19)
- 2006–2007: Rennes (assistant)
- 2007–2015: Rennes (reserves)
- 2015–2017: Paris Saint-Germain (reserves)
- 2017–2019: Paris Saint-Germain (U17)
- 2019–2021: Saint-Étienne (assistant)
- 2021–: Saint-Étienne (academy)
- 2023: Saint-Étienne (caretaker)
- 2024: Saint-Étienne (caretaker)
- * Club domestic league appearances and goals

Laurent Huard (born 26 August 1973) is a French football coach and a former player who is the academy coach of Ligue 1 club Saint-Étienne.

== Playing career ==
Huard played for nine years at Rennes, before stints at Sedan and Saint-Étienne. In 2002, he had to end his career due to heart problems.

== Coaching career ==
On 6 December 2023, Huard was appointed as caretaker manager by Saint-Étienne following the dismissal of Laurent Batlles.
