= Pierre Dréossi =

French footballer and manager (born 1959)

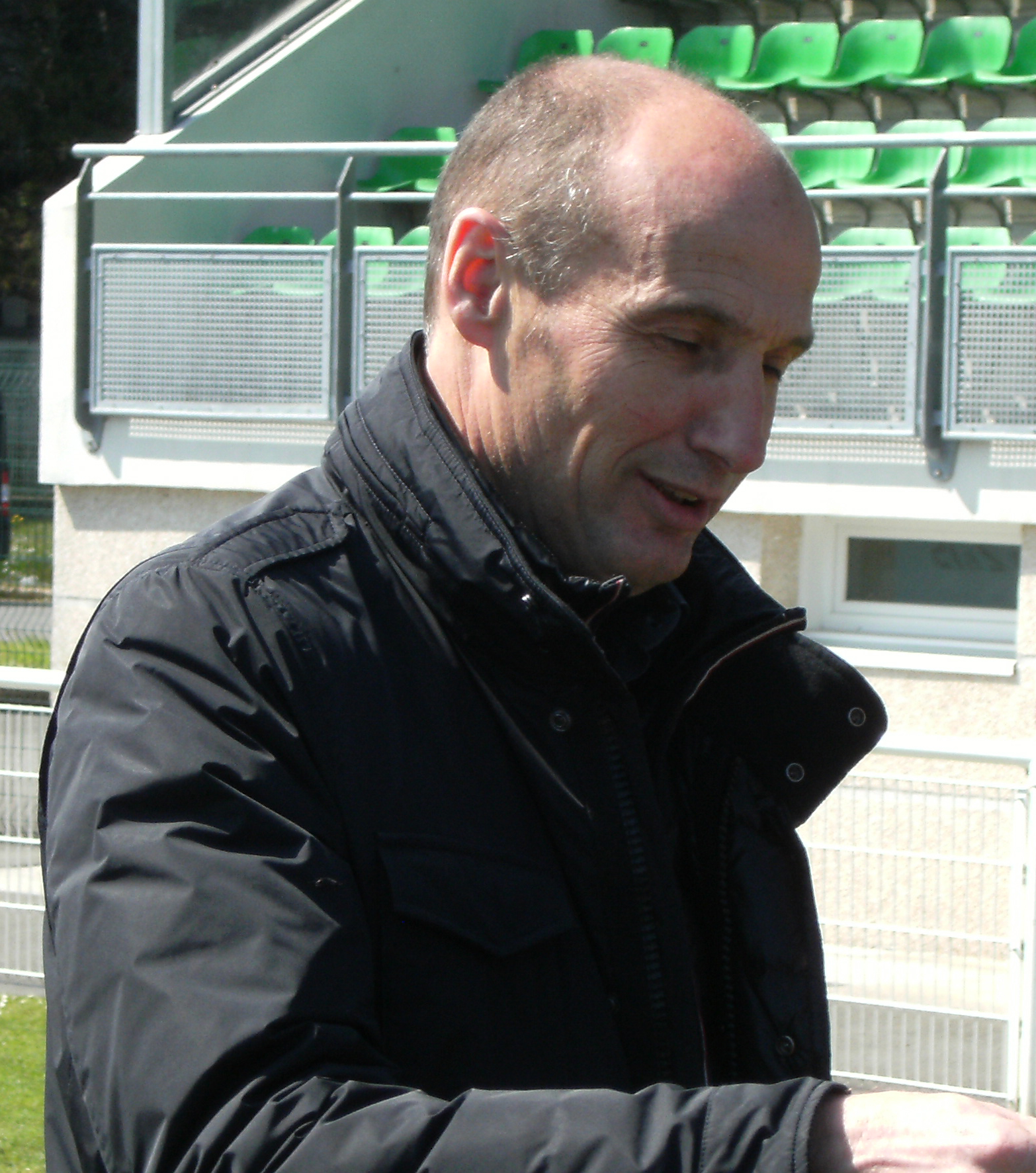
- Dréossi in 2013

Personal information
- Full name: Pierre Dréossi
- Date of birth: 12 October 1959 (age 67)
- Place of birth: Roubaix, France
- Height: 1.80 m (5 ft 11 in)
- Position: Defender

Senior career*
| Years | Team | Apps | (Gls) |
| 1976–1982 | Lille | | |
| 1982–1984 | Sochaux | | |
| 1984–1987 | Nice | | |
| 1987–1988 | Paris Saint-Germain | | |
| 1988–1992 | Cannes | | |

Managerial career
- 1993–1994: Cannes (youth academy)
- 1994–1996: Cannes (assistant coach)
- 1996–2002: Lille (sporting director)
- 2002–2006: Rennes (general manager)
- 2006–2007: Rennes (manager and first team coach)
- 2007–2009: Rennes (general manager)
- 2020–2021: Panathinaikos (general manager)
- * Club domestic league appearances and goals

Pierre Dréossi (born 12 October 1959) is a French football manager and former player.

He played as a defender for Lille OSC, FC Sochaux-Montbéliard, OGC Nice, Paris Saint-Germain and AS Cannes.

He was head coach of Stade Rennais until he resigned on 16 December 2007, after a 2–1 defeat against SM Caen.

He recently was the general manager of Panathinaikos.
