= 1958 Coupe de France final =

- Event: 1957–58 Coupe de France
Reims	Nîmes
3	1
- Date: 18 May 1958
- Venue: Olympique Yves-du-Manoir, Colombes
- Referee: Augustin Le Menn
- Attendance: 56,523

The 1958 Coupe de France final was a football match held at Stade Olympique Yves-du-Manoir, Colombes on 18 May 1958, that saw Stade de Reims defeat Nîmes Olympique 3–1 thanks to goals by René Bliard (2) and Just Fontaine.

== Match details ==
18 May 1958

Reims	3–1	Nîmes
Bliard 42', 89'; Fontaine 56'	Report	Mazouz 49'

Stade Olympique Yves-du-Manoir, Colombes
Attendance: 56,523
Referee: Augustin Le Menn

GK	(France) Dominique Colonna
DF	(France) Simon Zimny
DF	(France) Raoul Giraudo
DF	(France) Armand Penverne
DF	(France) Robert Jonquet (c)
MF	(France) Robert Siatka
MF	(France) Robert Lamartine
FW	(France) René Bliard
FW	(France) Just Fontaine
FW	(France) Roger Piantoni
FW	(France) Jean Vincent
Manager:
(France) Albert Batteux Assistant referees: Fourth official:

GK	(France) Alexandre Roszak
DF	(Morocco) Mustapha Bettache
DF	(France) Robert Venturi
DF	(France) Pierre Barlaguet
DF	(France) Maurice Lafont (c)
MF	(France) André Schwager
MF	(Spain) Emilio Salaber
FW	(Morocco) Hassan Akesbi
FW	(France) Henri Skiba
FW	(France) (Algeria) Abdelkader Mazouz
FW	(France) Bernard Rahis
Manager:
(France) (Algeria) Kader Firoud

== See also ==
- 1957–58 Coupe de France
