= Claude Prosdocimi =

French footballer and coach (1927–2016)

Claude "Prodo" Prosdocimi (11 July 1927, Campiglia dei Berici, Italy – 14 December 2016) was a French association football player and coach.

In the late 1940s the forward joined Stade de Reims, French champions of 1949. He debuted in the first team in the season 1949–50. Until 1955 he played 13 league matches for the club, scoring four goals. In those years Reims won under coach Albert Batteux the championships of 1953 and 1955, but in those seasons Prosdocimi played only one match in 1954–55. Michel Leblond, Michel Hidalgo, Robert Jonquet and Raymond Kopa were alongside his better known team-mates.

In later years Claude Prosdocimni had two stints as coach of the club. In late April 1964 he replaced Robert Jonquet for the remainder of the season and in January 1979 he succeeded Jean-Claude D'Arménia and Pierre Flamion. On both occasions he could not prevent the relegation of Stade de Reims, the first and the third relegation in club history.
