= French football clubs in international competitions =

French football clubs have entered European association football competitions since 1955–56 season, when Reims took part in the inaugural European Cup. Marseille became the first French club to win the UEFA Champions League in 1993, although their win was overshadowed by a bribery scandal. The only other French club to win at least a major trophy in Europe is Paris Saint-Germain, who won the Cup Winners' Cup in 1996, both the UEFA Champions League and UEFA Super Cup in 2025 and 2026, and the FIFA Intercontinental Cup in 2025.

== Finals ==
Year	Competition	French team	Opposing team	Score	Venue
1956	European Cup	Reims	(Spain) Real Madrid	3–4	(France) Parc des Princes, Paris
1959	European Cup	Reims	(Spain) Real Madrid	0–2	(West Germany) Neckarstadion, Stuttgart
1976	European Cup	Saint-Étienne	(West Germany) Bayern Munich	0–1	(Scotland) Hampden Park, Glasgow
1978	UEFA Cup	Bastia	(Netherlands) PSV Eindhoven	0–3 on aggregate	Two-legged
1991	European Cup	Marseille	(Socialist Federal Republic of Yugoslavia) Red Star Belgrade	0–0 (3–5 p)	(Italy) Stadio San Nicola, Bari
1992	Cup Winners' Cup	Monaco	(Germany) Werder Bremen	0–2	(Portugal) Estádio da Luz, Lisbon
1993	Champions League	Marseille	(Italy) Milan	1–0	(Germany) Olympic Stadium, Munich
1996	UEFA Cup	Bordeaux	(Germany) Bayern Munich	1–5 on aggregate	Two-legged
1996	Cup Winners' Cup	Paris Saint-Germain	(Austria) Rapid Wien	1–0	(Belgium) King Baudouin Stadium, Brussels
1996	Super Cup	Paris Saint-Germain	(Italy) Juventus	2–9 on aggregate	Two-legged
1997	Cup Winners' Cup	Paris Saint-Germain	(Spain) Barcelona	0–1	(Netherlands) De Kuip, Rotterdam
1999	UEFA Cup	Marseille	(Italy) Parma	0–3	(Russia) Luzhniki Stadium, Moscow
2004	UEFA Cup	Marseille	(Spain) Valencia	0–2	(Sweden) Ullevi, Gothenburg
2004	Champions League	Monaco	(Portugal) Porto	0–3	(Germany) Arena AufSchalke, Gelsenkirchen
2018	Europa League	Marseille	(Spain) Atlético Madrid	0–3	(France) Parc Olympique Lyonnais, Décines-Charpieu
2020	Champions League	Paris Saint-Germain	(Germany) Bayern Munich	0–1	(Portugal) Estádio da Luz, Lisbon
2025	Champions League	Paris Saint-Germain	(Italy) Inter Milan	5–0	(Germany) Allianz Arena, Munich
2025	Club World Cup	Paris Saint-Germain	(England) Chelsea	0–3	(United States) MetLife Stadium, East Rutherford
2025	Super Cup	Paris Saint-Germain	(England) Tottenham Hotspur	2–2 (4–3 p)	(Italy) Stadio Friuli, Udine
2025	Intercontinental Cup	Paris Saint-Germain	(Brazil) Flamengo	1–1 (2–1 p)	(Qatar) Ahmad bin Ali Stadium, Al Rayyan
2026	Champions League	Paris Saint-Germain	(England) Arsenal	1–1 (4–3 p)	(Hungary) Puskás Aréna, Budapest
2026	Super Cup	Paris Saint-Germain	(England) Aston Villa	2–1	(Austria) Red Bull Arena, Salzburg

== Final appearance by competition ==
Competition	Winners	Runners-up	Total
European Cup / UEFA Champions League	3	6	9
European / UEFA Cup Winners' Cup	1	2	3
UEFA Cup / UEFA Europa League	0	5	5
UEFA Super Cup	2	1	3
FIFA Club World Cup	0	1	1
FIFA Intercontinental Cup	1	0	1
Total	7	15	22

== French overseas clubs ==
Overseas France areas frequently field teams in the Oceania and Caribbean continental cups.

Hienghène Sport from New Caledonia won the 2019 OFC Champions League and thus qualified for the 2019 FIFA Club World Cup, becoming the first-ever French club to participate in the FIFA Club World Cup.

Once has a team from Overseas France reached the semi-finals of a top-tier Caribbean cup, which was AS Samaritaine from Martinique in the 2021 Caribbean Club Championship, by virtue of which they qualified for the 2021 CONCACAF League continental tier 2 tournament.

Club Franciscain from Martinique won the first edition of the Caribbean tier 2 tournament CFU Club Shield in the 2018 season and then won a playoff to qualify for the 2018 CONCACAF League.

=== Overseas clubs final appearance by competition ===
Competition	Winners	Runners-up	Total
OFC Men's Champions League	1	6	7
CFU Club Shield	1	2	3
Total	2	8	10
