= List of European Cup and UEFA Champions League winning managers =

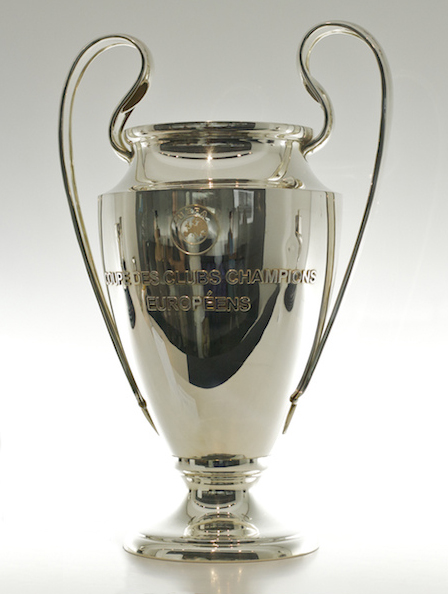
UEFA Champions League trophy

The UEFA Champions League, known as the European Cup before 1992, is an association football competition contested since 1956. Spanish manager José Villalonga led Real Madrid to success in the inaugural final in 1956 and repeated the feat the following season. The competition became the UEFA Champions League in 1992, with Belgian Raymond Goethals leading French club Marseille to success that season.

Carlo Ancelotti has won a record five titles with AC Milan and Real Madrid. Bob Paisley, Zinedine Zidane, Pep Guardiola and Luis Enrique have won the tournament three times. Paisley led Liverpool to three titles in five seasons, Zidane won three consecutive titles with Real Madrid, and Luis Enrique led Paris Saint-Germain to two consecutive titles and Barcelona to one title. Sixteen other managers have won the competition twice. Only seven managers have won the title with two clubs: Ancelotti with Milan in 2003 and 2007 and Real Madrid in 2014, 2022, and 2024; Ernst Happel with Feyenoord in 1970 and Hamburg in 1983; Ottmar Hitzfeld with Borussia Dortmund in 1997 and Bayern Munich in 2001; José Mourinho with Porto in 2004 and Inter Milan in 2010; Jupp Heynckes with Real Madrid in 1998 and Bayern Munich in 2013; Guardiola with Barcelona in 2009 and 2011 and Manchester City in 2023; and Luis Enrique with Barcelona in 2015 and Paris Saint-Germain in 2025 and 2026. Seven men have won the tournament both as a player and as a manager: Miguel Muñoz, Giovanni Trapattoni, Johan Cruyff, Frank Rijkaard, Ancelotti, Guardiola and Zidane. The youngest winning manager ever is José Villalonga at 36 in the inaugural edition in 1956, while the oldest is Raymond Goethals who won the 1993 edition at 71. The oldest winning manager still alive is Giovanni Trapattoni, 87 years old.

== List ==
=== By year ===
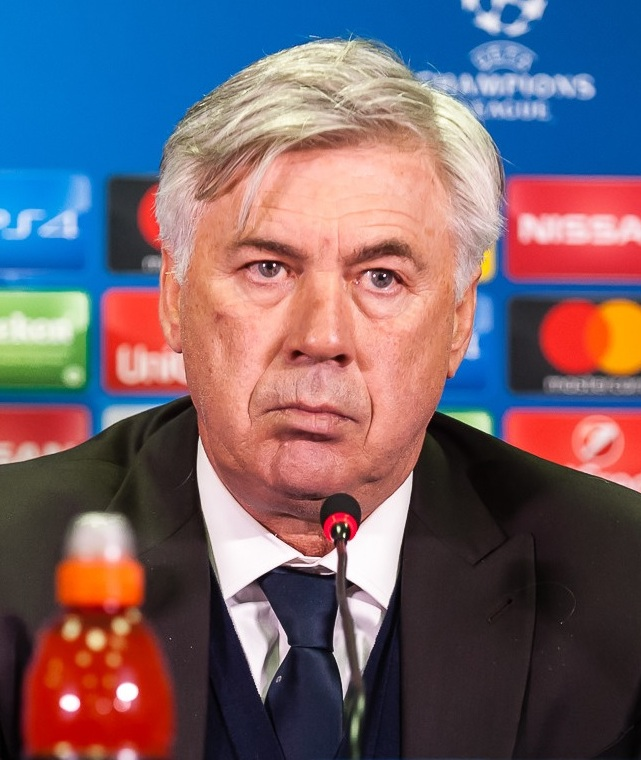
Carlo Ancelotti became the first and only manager to win five titles when he led Real Madrid to victory in 2024. He also reached a record total of six Champions League finals.

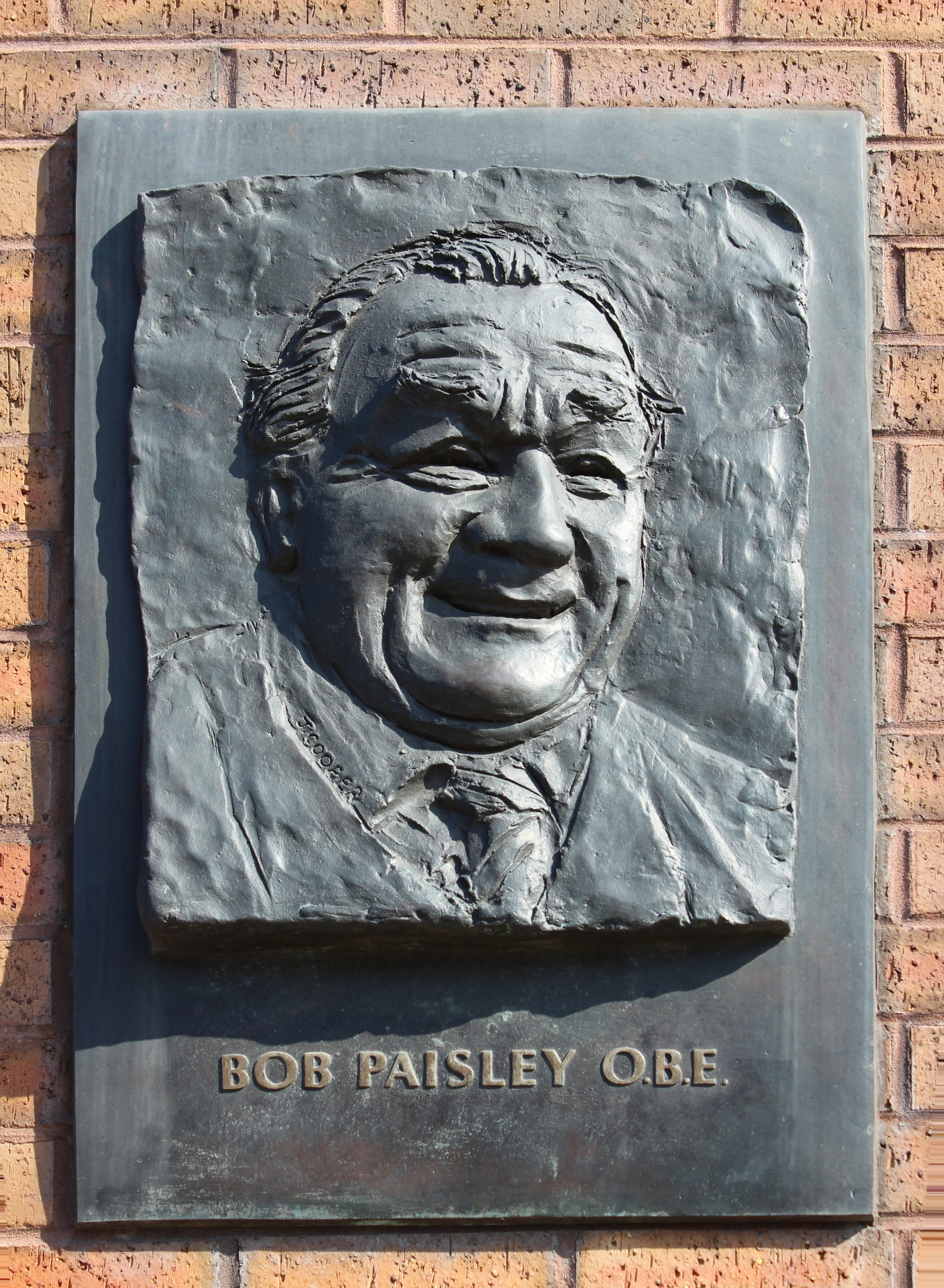
Bob Paisley was the first manager to win the title three times, all with Liverpool.

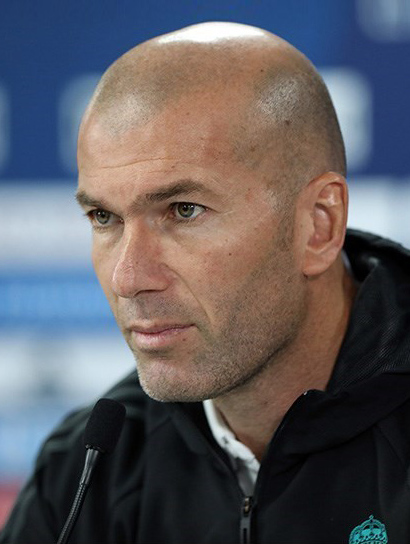
Zinedine Zidane is the only manager to have won titles in three consecutive years, all with Real Madrid.

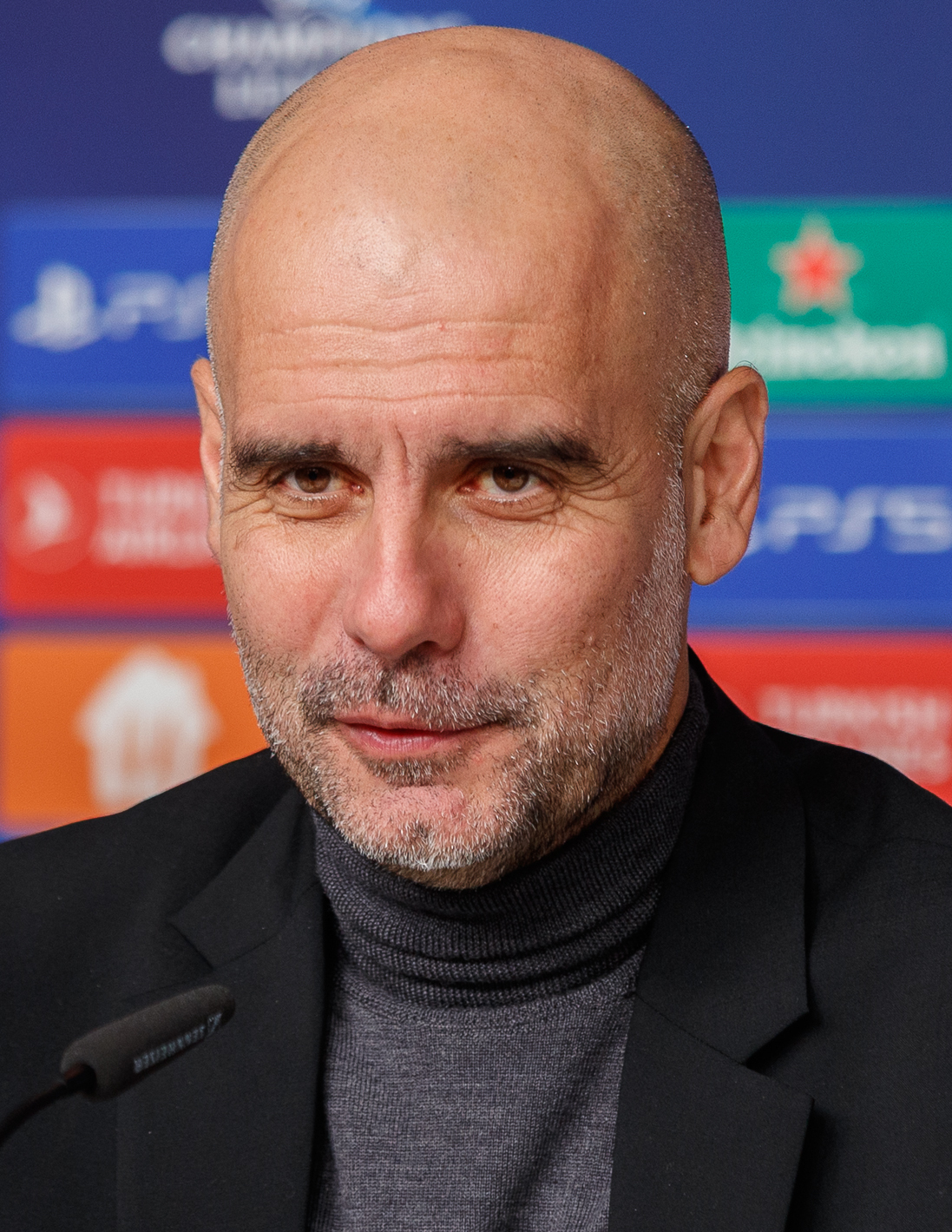
Pep Guardiola won three titles in 2009, 2011 and 2023, with Barcelona and Manchester City.

European Cup and UEFA Champions League winning managers
Final	Nationality	Winning manager	Nation	Club	Ref.
1956	Spain	José Villalonga	Spain	Real Madrid	
1957	Spain	José Villalonga	Spain	Real Madrid	
1958	Argentina	Luis Carniglia	Spain	Real Madrid	
1959	Argentina	Luis Carniglia	Spain	Real Madrid	
1960	Spain	Miguel Muñoz	Spain	Real Madrid	
1961	Hungary	Béla Guttmann	Portugal	Benfica	
1962	Hungary	Béla Guttmann	Portugal	Benfica	
1963	Italy	Nereo Rocco	Italy	Milan	
1964	Argentina	Helenio Herrera	Italy	Inter Milan	
1965	Argentina	Helenio Herrera	Italy	Inter Milan	
1966	Spain	Miguel Muñoz	Spain	Real Madrid	
1967	Scotland	Jock Stein	Scotland	Celtic	
1968	Scotland	Matt Busby	England	Manchester United	
1969	Italy	Nereo Rocco	Italy	Milan	
1970	Austria	Ernst Happel	Netherlands	Feyenoord	
1971	Netherlands	Rinus Michels	Netherlands	Ajax	
1972	Romania	Ștefan Kovács	Netherlands	Ajax	
1973	Romania	Ștefan Kovács	Netherlands	Ajax	
1974	West Germany	Udo Lattek	West Germany	Bayern Munich	
1975	West Germany	Dettmar Cramer	West Germany	Bayern Munich	
1976	West Germany	Dettmar Cramer	West Germany	Bayern Munich	
1977	England	Bob Paisley	England	Liverpool	
1978	England	Bob Paisley	England	Liverpool	
1979	England	Brian Clough	England	Nottingham Forest	
1980	England	Brian Clough	England	Nottingham Forest	
1981	England	Bob Paisley	England	Liverpool	
1982	England	Tony Barton	England	Aston Villa	
1983	Austria	Ernst Happel	West Germany	Hamburger SV	
1984	England	Joe Fagan	England	Liverpool	
1985	Italy	Giovanni Trapattoni	Italy	Juventus	
1986	Romania	Emerich Jenei	Romania	Steaua București	
1987	Portugal	Artur Jorge	Portugal	Porto	
1988	Netherlands	Guus Hiddink	Netherlands	PSV Eindhoven	
1989	Italy	Arrigo Sacchi	Italy	Milan	
1990	Italy	Arrigo Sacchi	Italy	Milan	
1991	Yugoslavia	Ljupko Petrović	Yugoslavia	Red Star Belgrade	
1992	Netherlands	Johan Cruyff	Spain	Barcelona	
1993	Belgium	Raymond Goethals	France	Marseille	
1994	Italy	Fabio Capello	Italy	Milan	
1995	Netherlands	Louis van Gaal	Netherlands	Ajax	
1996	Italy	Marcello Lippi	Italy	Juventus	
1997	Germany	Ottmar Hitzfeld	Germany	Borussia Dortmund	
1998	Germany	Jupp Heynckes	Spain	Real Madrid	
1999	Scotland	Alex Ferguson	England	Manchester United	
2000	Spain	Vicente del Bosque	Spain	Real Madrid	
2001	Germany	Ottmar Hitzfeld	Germany	Bayern Munich	
2002	Spain	Vicente del Bosque	Spain	Real Madrid	
2003	Italy	Carlo Ancelotti	Italy	Milan	
2004	Portugal	José Mourinho	Portugal	Porto	
2005	Spain	Rafael Benítez	England	Liverpool	
2006	Netherlands	Frank Rijkaard	Spain	Barcelona	
2007	Italy	Carlo Ancelotti	Italy	Milan	
2008	Scotland	Alex Ferguson	England	Manchester United	
2009	Spain	Pep Guardiola	Spain	Barcelona	
2010	Portugal	José Mourinho	Italy	Inter Milan	
2011	Spain	Pep Guardiola	Spain	Barcelona	
2012	Italy	Roberto Di Matteo	England	Chelsea	
2013	Germany	Jupp Heynckes	Germany	Bayern Munich	
2014	Italy	Carlo Ancelotti	Spain	Real Madrid	
2015	Spain	Luis Enrique	Spain	Barcelona	
2016	France	Zinedine Zidane	Spain	Real Madrid	
2017	France	Zinedine Zidane	Spain	Real Madrid	
2018	France	Zinedine Zidane	Spain	Real Madrid	
2019	Germany	Jürgen Klopp	England	Liverpool	
2020	Germany	Hansi Flick	Germany	Bayern Munich	
2021	Germany	Thomas Tuchel	England	Chelsea	
2022	Italy	Carlo Ancelotti	Spain	Real Madrid	
2023	Spain	Pep Guardiola	England	Manchester City	
2024	Italy	Carlo Ancelotti	Spain	Real Madrid	
2025	Spain	Luis Enrique	France	Paris Saint-Germain	
2026	Spain	Luis Enrique	France	Paris Saint-Germain	

=== Managers with multiple titles ===
Managers who have won multiple European Cups/UEFA Champions Leagues
Rank	Nationality	Manager	Wins	Years won	Club(s)
1	Italy	Carlo Ancelotti	5	2003, 2007, 2014, 2022, 2024	Milan (2), Real Madrid (3)
2	England	Bob Paisley	3	1977, 1978, 1981	Liverpool
2	France	Zinedine Zidane	3	2016, 2017, 2018	Real Madrid
2	Spain	Pep Guardiola	3	2009, 2011, 2023	Barcelona (2), Manchester City
2	Spain	Luis Enrique	3	2015, 2025, 2026	Barcelona, Paris Saint-Germain (2)
6	Spain	José Villalonga	2	1956, 1957	Real Madrid
6	Argentina	Luis Carniglia	2	1958, 1959	Real Madrid
6	Hungary	Béla Guttmann	2	1961, 1962	Benfica
6	Argentina	Helenio Herrera	2	1964, 1965	Inter Milan
6	Spain	Miguel Muñoz	2	1960, 1966	Real Madrid
6	Italy	Nereo Rocco	2	1963, 1969	Milan
6	Romania	Ștefan Kovács	2	1972, 1973	Ajax
6	Germany	Dettmar Cramer	2	1975, 1976	Bayern Munich
6	England	Brian Clough	2	1979, 1980	Nottingham Forest
6	Austria	Ernst Happel	2	1970, 1983	Feyenoord, Hamburger SV
6	Italy	Arrigo Sacchi	2	1989, 1990	Milan
6	Germany	Ottmar Hitzfeld	2	1997, 2001	Borussia Dortmund, Bayern Munich
6	Spain	Vicente del Bosque	2	2000, 2002	Real Madrid
6	Scotland	Alex Ferguson	2	1999, 2008	Manchester United
6	Portugal	José Mourinho	2	2004, 2010	Porto, Inter Milan
6	Germany	Jupp Heynckes	2	1998, 2013	Real Madrid, Bayern Munich

=== By nationality ===
This table lists the total number of titles won by managers of each country.

European Cup and UEFA Champions League winning managers by nationality
Nationality	Number of wins
Italy	13
Spain	13
Germany (Note: Includes West Germany.)	10
England	7
Netherlands	5
Argentina (Note: Includes the titles won by Helenio Herrera, who also had French citizenship.)	4
Scotland	4
France	3
Portugal	3
Romania	3
Austria	2
Hungary	2
Belgium	1
Yugoslavia	1

== See also ==
- European Cup and UEFA Champions League records and statistics
- List of European Cup and UEFA Champions League finals
