= 2017 UEFA Champions League final =

Football match in Cardiff, Wales

- Match programme cover
- Event: 2016–17 UEFA Champions League
Juventus	Real Madrid
(Italy)	(Spain)
1	4
- Date: 3 June 2017
- Venue: Millennium Stadium, Cardiff
- Man of the Match: Cristiano Ronaldo (Real Madrid)
- Referee: Felix Brych (Germany)
- Attendance: 65,842
- Weather: Partly cloudy 16 °C (61 °F); 56% humidity

The 2017 UEFA Champions League final was the final match of the 2016–17 UEFA Champions League, the 62nd season of Europe's premier club football tournament organised by UEFA, and the 25th season since it was renamed from the European Cup to the UEFA Champions League. It was played at the Millennium Stadium in Cardiff, Wales on 3 June 2017, between Italian side Juventus and Spanish side and title holders Real Madrid, in a repeat of the 1998 final. This was the first final to feature the title holders since Manchester United lost in 2009. This would also be the first European Cup final held under a closed roof. Real Madrid won the match 4–1 to secure their 12th title in this competition. With this victory, Real Madrid became the first team to successfully defend their title since Milan in 1990. Meanwhile, Juventus lost their seventh Champions League final out of nine finals.

Real Madrid qualified as the UEFA representative at the 2017 FIFA Club World Cup in the United Arab Emirates, and also earned the right to play against the winners of the 2016–17 UEFA Europa League, Manchester United, in the 2017 UEFA Super Cup, triumphing in both competitions.

== Background ==
The match was a repeat of the 1998 final, making it the eighth repeated final pairing. Real Madrid won the 1998 final 1–0. The 2017 final was the first time since the two teams met in 1998 that both finalists had won either their domestic league or the Champions League the previous season.

Juventus reached their ninth final after a 4–1 aggregate win against Monaco to maintain their undefeated record in this season's competition. Juventus also entered the final with the best defensive record in the 2016–17 Champions League, having conceded only three times. Previously Juventus won finals in 1985 and 1996, and lost a record six in 1973, 1983, 1997, 1998, 2003 and 2015. This was also their 14th final in all seasonal UEFA competitions, having also played in one Cup Winners' Cup final (winning in 1984) and four UEFA Cup finals (winning in 1977, 1990 and 1993, and losing in 1995). If they were to lose, Juventus would tie Benfica's record of five consecutive finals lost.

Title holders Real Madrid reached a record 15th final after a 4–2 aggregate win against city rivals Atlético Madrid, knocking them out of the competition for the fourth consecutive season. Real Madrid went into the final as top scorers of the 2016–17 Champions League, having scored 32 goals. This final was their third since 2014, and gave Real a chance to win a record 12th title. Previously they won finals in 1956, 1957, 1958, 1959, 1960, 1966, 1998, 2000, 2002, 2014 and 2016, and lost in 1962, 1964 and 1981. This was also their 19th final in all seasonal UEFA competitions, having also played in two Cup Winners' Cup finals (losing in 1971 and 1983) and two UEFA Cup finals (winning in 1985 and 1986). Real Madrid were looking to be the first team in the Champions League era (since 1993) to win two consecutive finals. Four times prior the previous champions had advanced to the final (Milan in 1995, Ajax in 1996, Juventus in 1997, and Manchester United in 2009), but on all occasions the title holders lost.

The two sides had previously met eighteen times in European competitions, all in the European Cup/UEFA Champions League, with a record of eight wins each and two draws. The first meeting between the two sides took place in the 1961–62 European Cup quarter-finals, where Real Madrid beat Juventus 3–1 in a play-off after the two sides exchanged 1–0 away wins. The most recent meeting between the clubs had taken place in the 2014–15 UEFA Champions League semi-finals, where Juventus won 3–2 on aggregate to advance to the 2015 final.

Juventus entered the final chasing their first treble of domestic league, domestic cup, and Champions League titles, bidding to become the ninth team to win it. They won the 2016–17 Coppa Italia after defeating Lazio in the final on 17 May, and clinched the 2016–17 Serie A title on 21 May. Real Madrid were chasing the double of domestic league and Champions League titles, having won the 2016–17 La Liga on 21 May, the final day of the season.

=== Previous finals ===
In the following table, finals until 1992 were in the European Cup era, since 1993 were in the UEFA Champions League era.

Team	Previous finals appearances (bold indicates winners)
(Italy) Juventus	8 (1973, 1983, **1985**, **1996**, 1997, 1998, 2003, 2015)
(Spain) Real Madrid	14 (**1956**, **1957**, **1958**, **1959**, **1960**, 1962, 1964, **1966**, 1981, **1998**, **2000**, **2002**, **2014**, **2016**)

== Venue ==
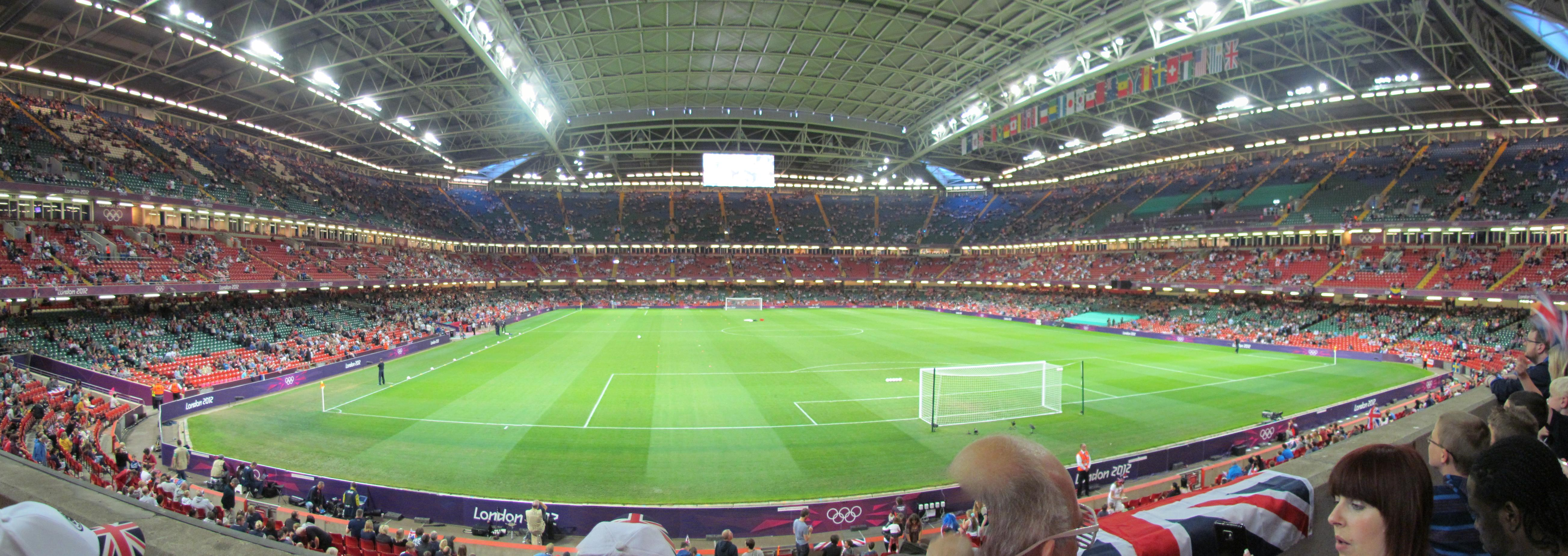
The Millennium Stadium in Cardiff hosted the final

The Millennium Stadium was announced as the final venue on 30 June 2015, following the decision of the UEFA Executive Committee meeting in Prague, Czech Republic. The stadium entered into a naming rights deal with the Principality Building Society in 2016 that saw it renamed as the "Principality Stadium"; however, due to UEFA regulations regarding the use of names of non-tournament sponsors, they continue to use the name "Millennium Stadium" in official literature, while the name "National Stadium of Wales" was used for the final itself.

Shortly before the final date of 3 June 2017, it was announced that for security reasons the retractable roof would be closed. This marked the first and so far only time that the UEFA Champions League final was held indoors.

== Route to the final ==
Note: In all results below, the score of the finalist is given first (H: home; A: away).

(Italy) Juventus				Round	(Spain) Real Madrid			
Opponent	Result			Group stage	Opponent	Result		
(Spain) Sevilla	0–0 (H)			Matchday 1	(Portugal) Sporting CP	2–1 (H)		
(Croatia) Dinamo Zagreb	4–0 (A)			Matchday 2	(Germany) Borussia Dortmund	2–2 (A)		
(France) Lyon	1–0 (A)			Matchday 3	(Poland) Legia Warsaw	5–1 (H)		
(France) Lyon	1–1 (H)			Matchday 4	(Poland) Legia Warsaw	3–3 (A)		
(Spain) Sevilla	3–1 (A)			Matchday 5	(Portugal) Sporting CP	2–1 (A)		
(Croatia) Dinamo Zagreb	2–0 (H)			Matchday 6	(Germany) Borussia Dortmund	2–2 (H)		
Group H winners: Pos / Team / Pld / Pts; 1 / (Italy) Juventus / 6 / 14; 2 / (Spain) Sevilla / 6 / 11; 3 / (France) Lyon / 6 / 8; 4 / (Croatia) Dinamo Zagreb / 6 / 0; Source: UEFA				Final standings	Group F runners-up: Pos / Team / Pld / Pts; 1 / (Germany) Borussia Dortmund / 6 / 14; 2 / (Spain) Real Madrid / 6 / 12; 3 / (Poland) Legia Warsaw / 6 / 4; 4 / (Portugal) Sporting CP / 6 / 3; Source: UEFA			
Opponent	Agg.	1st leg	2nd leg	Knockout phase	Opponent	Agg.	1st leg	2nd leg
(Portugal) Porto	3–0	2–0 (A)	1–0 (H)	Round of 16	(Italy) Napoli	6–2	3–1 (H)	3–1 (A)
(Spain) Barcelona	3–0	3–0 (H)	0–0 (A)	Quarter-finals	(Germany) Bayern Munich	6–3	2–1 (A)	4–2 (a.e.t.) (H)
(France) Monaco	4–1	2–0 (A)	2–1 (H)	Semi-finals	(Spain) Atlético Madrid	4–2	3–0 (H)	1–2 (A)

== Pre-match ==
=== Ambassador ===
The ambassador for the final was former Wales international Ian Rush, who won the European Cup with Liverpool in 1984, and also played for Juventus from 1987 to 1988.

=== Identity ===
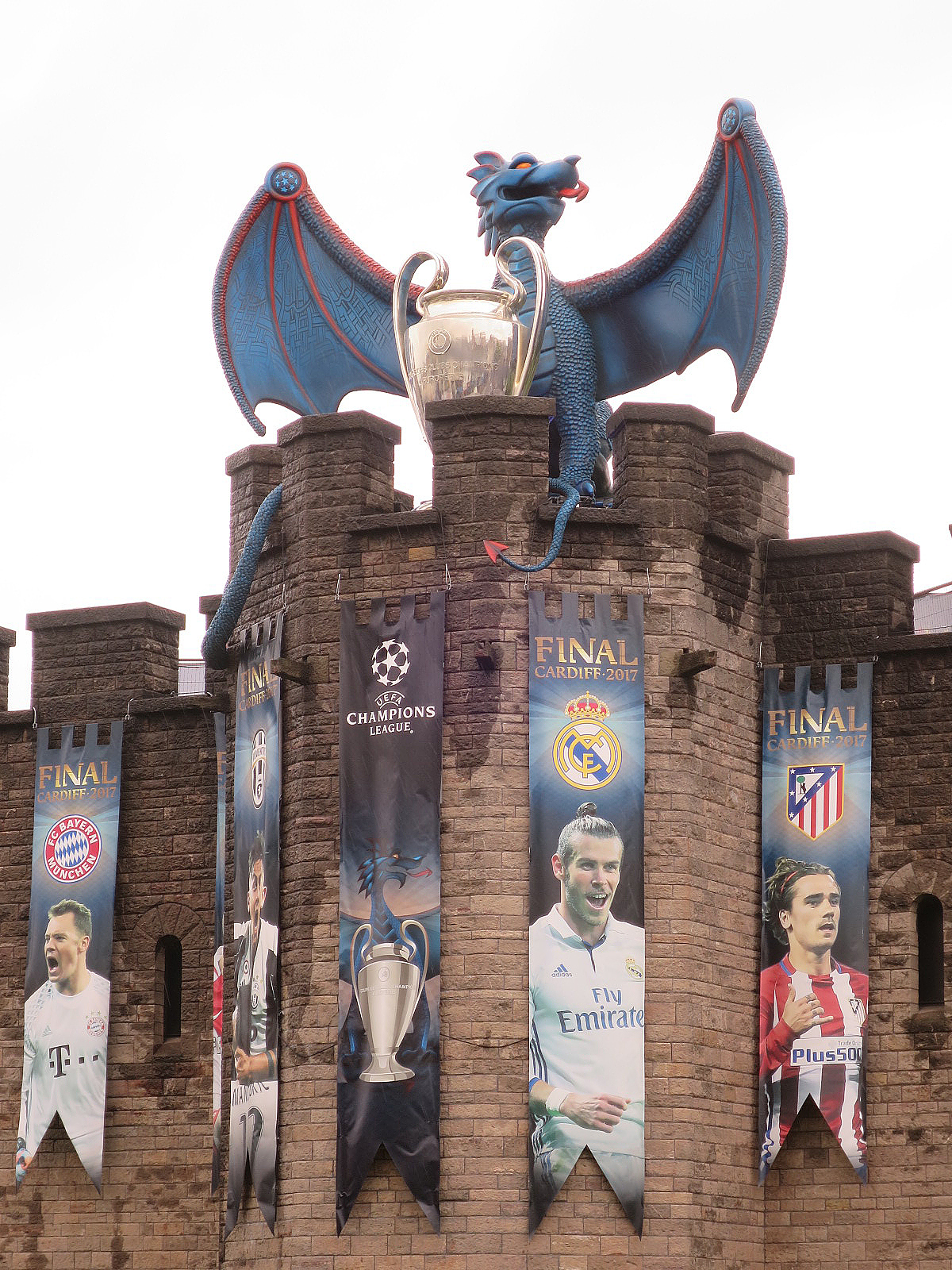
The dragon logo on Cardiff Castle

UEFA unveiled the brand identity of the final on 25 August 2016 in Monaco during the group stage draw.

=== Ticketing ===
With a stadium capacity of 66,000 for the final, a total of 41,500 tickets were available to fans and the general public; the two finalist teams received 18,000 tickets each and 5,500 tickets were made available for sale to fans worldwide via UEFA.com from 17 to 28 March 2017 in four price categories: £390, £275, £140, and £60. The remaining tickets were allocated to the local organising committee, UEFA and national associations, commercial partners and broadcasters, and to serve the corporate hospitality programme.

=== Officials ===
In May 2017, German referee Felix Brych was selected to supervise the final. He was joined by fellow German officials Mark Borsch and Stefan Lupp as assistant referees, Bastian Dankert and Marco Fritz as additional assistant referees, Rafael Foltyn as reserve assistant referee, and Serbian Milorad Mažić as fourth official.

=== Opening ceremony ===
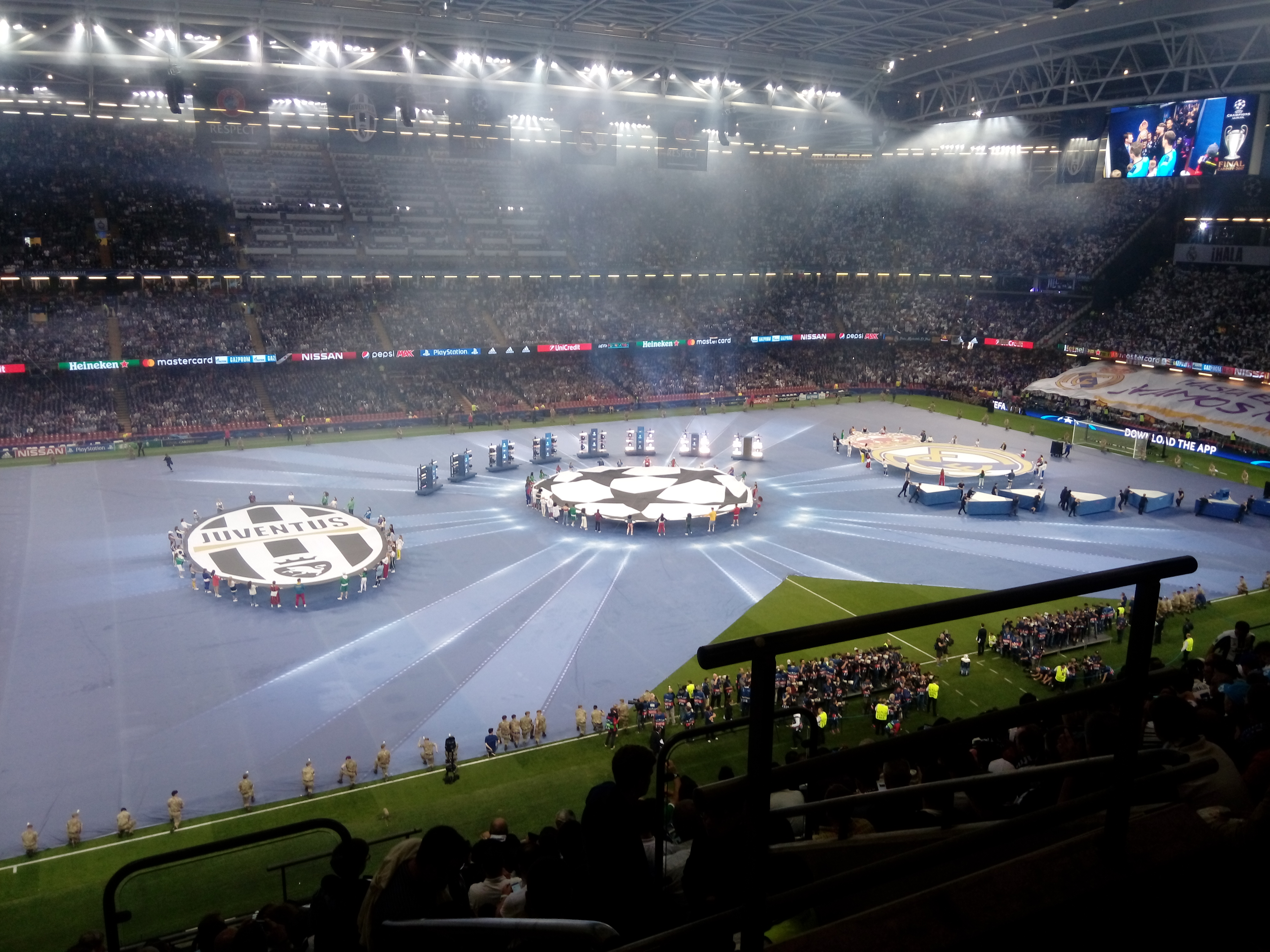
The opening ceremony

American hip-hop group The Black Eyed Peas performed at the opening ceremony, which included a pyrotechnic display that ran over time and delayed the kick-off for several minutes. The UEFA Champions League Anthem featured a recording of Italian tenor Andrea Bocelli from the previous season's final.

=== Related events ===
The 2017 UEFA Women's Champions League final was held two days prior, on 1 June 2017, at the Cardiff City Stadium, with title holders Lyon beating Paris Saint-Germain 7–6 on penalties, following a 0–0 draw after extra time. The winning penalty was scored by Lyon goalkeeper Sarah Bouhaddi, immediately after her opposite number, Katarzyna Kiedrzynek, had missed her kick.

The annual UEFA Champions Festival was held between 1–4 June 2017 at Cardiff Bay.

== Match ==
=== Summary ===
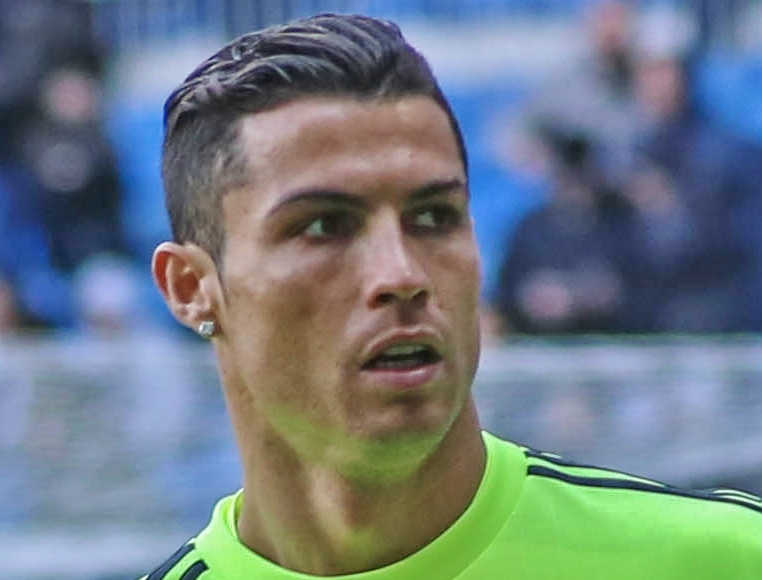
Cristiano Ronaldo, who scored twice, was named Man of the Match.

Juventus dominated possession in the opening 19 minutes of the match, and had three major chances to score. Gonzalo Higuaín had two shots on goal that were easily saved by Keylor Navas, while Miralem Pjanić had a more dangerous chance that Navas dived to push wide to his right. Despite the scoring chances, as well as the closing down of Real Madrid's counterattacks in the midfield, Cristiano Ronaldo scored the first goal of the match in the 20th minute; Dani Carvajal played a one-two on the right with Ronaldo before passing across for him to shoot low to the left corner of the net, which deflected in off the right foot of Leonardo Bonucci. Juventus responded with a goal seven minutes later to bring the score to 1–1. Mario Mandžukić chested down a ball from Higuaín and hooked the ball over his shoulder from 15 yards (14 m), which arced over Navas. The goal was heralded as one of the best goals ever scored in a Champions League final and was compared to Zinedine Zidane's goal in the 2002 final for Real Madrid. Juventus remained in control through the end of the first half, while Real Madrid conceded two yellow cards for defenders Sergio Ramos and Dani Carvajal.

Real Madrid began the second half strongly and in control, though play was stopped several times for fouls and injuries to both sides. Real Madrid took a 2–1 lead in the 61st minute from a long-range strike from Casemiro, which deflected off Sami Khedira and past Gianluigi Buffon to the left corner of the net. Three minutes later, Ronaldo scored Madrid's third goal of the night and his second, finishing in the 6-yard (5.5 m) box from a cut-back from Luka Modrić on the right. Juventus, fending off additional attacks from Madrid, picked up three additional yellow cards, including one to newly substituted Juan Cuadrado. Real Madrid replaced striker Karim Benzema with Gareth Bale, a Cardiff native who had not been fit enough to start but was given a homecoming. Cuadrado picked up a second yellow card and was sent off in the 84th minute for a shove on Sergio Ramos, who went down while holding his foot. Marco Asensio scored Madrid's fourth and final goal in the 90th minute, a tap-in from 12 yards (11 m) after a cut-back from Marcelo from the left.

=== Details ===
The "home" team (for administrative purposes) was determined by an additional draw held after the semi-final draw, which was held on 21 April 2017 at UEFA headquarters in Nyon, Switzerland.

3 June 2017
19:45 UTC+1

Juventus (Italy)	1–4	(Spain) Real Madrid
Mandžukić 27'	Report	Ronaldo 20', 64'; Casemiro 61'; Asensio 90'

Millennium Stadium, Cardiff
Attendance: 65,842
Referee: Felix Brych (Germany)

Juventus	Real Madrid

GK	1	(Italy) Gianluigi Buffon (c)
CB	15	(Italy) Andrea Barzagli	(substituted off) 66'
CB	19	(Italy) Leonardo Bonucci
CB	3	(Italy) Giorgio Chiellini
RM	23	(Brazil) Dani Alves
CM	5	(Bosnia and Herzegovina) Miralem Pjanić	(yellow card) 66'	(substituted off) 71'
CM	6	(Germany) Sami Khedira
LM	12	(Brazil) Alex Sandro	(yellow card) 70'
AM	21	(Argentina) Paulo Dybala	(yellow card) 12'	(substituted off) 78'
CF	9	(Argentina) Gonzalo Higuaín
CF	17	(Croatia) Mario Mandžukić
Substitutes:
GK	25	(Brazil) Neto
DF	4	(Morocco) Medhi Benatia
DF	26	(Switzerland) Stephan Lichtsteiner
MF	7	(Colombia) Juan Cuadrado	(yellow card) 72' (yellow-red card) 84'	(substituted on) 66'
MF	8	(Italy) Claudio Marchisio	(substituted on) 71'
MF	18	(Gabon) Mario Lemina	(substituted on) 78'
MF	22	(Ghana) Kwadwo Asamoah
Manager:
(Italy) Massimiliano Allegri

GK	1	(Costa Rica) Keylor Navas
RB	2	(Spain) Dani Carvajal	(yellow card) 42'
CB	4	(Spain) Sergio Ramos (c)	(yellow card) 31'
CB	5	(France) Raphaël Varane
LB	12	(Brazil) Marcelo
DM	14	(Brazil) Casemiro
CM	8	(Germany) Toni Kroos	(yellow card) 53'	(substituted off) 89'
CM	19	(Croatia) Luka Modrić
RF	22	(Spain) Isco	(substituted off) 82'
CF	9	(France) Karim Benzema	(substituted off) 77'
LF	7	(Portugal) Cristiano Ronaldo
Substitutes:
GK	13	(Spain) Kiko Casilla
DF	6	(Spain) Nacho
DF	23	(Brazil) Danilo
MF	16	(Croatia) Mateo Kovačić
MF	20	(Spain) Marco Asensio	(yellow card) 90+1'	(substituted on) 82'
FW	11	(Wales) Gareth Bale	(substituted on) 77'
FW	21	(Spain) Álvaro Morata	(substituted on) 89'
Manager:
(France) Zinedine Zidane

Man of the Match:
Cristiano Ronaldo (Real Madrid)

Assistant referees:
Mark Borsch (Germany)
Stefan Lupp (Germany)
Fourth official:
Milorad Mažić (Serbia)
Additional assistant referees:
Bastian Dankert (Germany)
Marco Fritz (Germany)
Reserve assistant referee:
Rafael Foltyn (Germany)

Match rules

- 90 minutes.
- 30 minutes of extra time if necessary.
- Penalty shoot-out if scores still level.
- Seven named substitutes, of which up to three may be used.

=== Statistics ===
First half
Statistic	Juventus	Real Madrid
Goals scored	1	1
Total shots	8	5
Shots on target	4	1
Saves	0	3
Ball possession	45%	55%
Corner kicks	1	0
Fouls committed	10	13
Offsides	1	0
Yellow cards	1	2
Red cards	0	0

Second half
Statistic	Juventus	Real Madrid
Goals scored	0	3
Total shots	3	13
Shots on target	0	4
Saves	1	0
Ball possession	47%	53%
Corner kicks	0	1
Fouls committed	13	5
Offsides	2	1
Yellow cards	4	2
Red cards	1	0

Overall
Statistic	Juventus	Real Madrid
Goals scored	1	4
Total shots	11	18
Shots on target	4	5
Saves	1	3
Ball possession	46%	54%
Corner kicks	1	1
Fouls committed	23	18
Offsides	3	1
Yellow cards	5	4
Red cards	1	0

== Post-match ==
The trophy presentation returned to the pitch for the first time since 2006 when Barcelona collected the trophy. UEFA president Aleksander Čeferin said "The pitch is the players' stage and it is only fitting that their achievements are celebrated there", The European Cup was then presented to Real Madrid captain Sergio Ramos to commemorate the first team to win it the back-to-back.

With their win, Real Madrid secured a record-extending twelfth title in the European Cup/Champions League and became the first club to win back-to-back titles in the Champions League era. This was the club's third title win in four seasons; a feat that has only occurred thrice before – Real Madrid (1956–60), Ajax (1971–73) and Bayern Munich (1974–76). Real Madrid has not lost a final in the Champions League era, with their last defeat occurring in 1981. The victory also saw Madrid secure their first League – European Cup double since the 1957–58 season. Madrid's first goal in the final marked their 500th all-time goal in the competition, becoming the first club to reach the milestone. Cristiano Ronaldo also became the first player to score in three Champions League finals, and ranking second with the European Cup included, only behind Alfredo Di Stéfano's five finals scored in. Twenty-one year old Asensio became the youngest Real Madrid player to score in a European Cup/Champions League final.

With their loss, Juventus extended their record number of final losses to seven, and tied Benfica's record of five consecutive finals lost.

=== Reactions ===
At the post-match press conference, Allegri stated that Juventus had played well in the first-half but failed to make the most of their chances. He felt that his team "let go psychologically" after conceding the second goal. Allegri added, "Even if Real Madrid had a very good second half and have excellent players who can change the game at any moment, that second goal knocked the wind out of our sails. They raised the tempo, as we were the ones pushing Real Madrid back in the first half, but in the second we couldn't play our way out of defence and they kept pushing us back. At that moment, we should've taken out the extra energy to push hard and keep the game open, as we know Real Madrid leave you the chances to score at all times, but we conceded the third goal and that was really damaging." Juventus captain Buffon stated that losing the match was a big disappointment. He felt his side had "an excellent first half, where we caused Real Madrid huge problems" but "in the second half their class, strength and how accustomed they are to winning these games showed through. They won deservedly." If Juventus had won, Buffon would have become the oldest player to win a Champions League surpassing compatriot Paolo Maldini. FIFA President Gianni Infantino, who attended the match, told reporters, "Juventus played a great first half, then in the second Real Madrid were extraordinary. They were two excellent sides and in the end the best team won."

Zidane declared that his players deserved to win the double and become the first team to defend the title in the Champions league era. Zidane stated, "They have made history, for sure. Nobody has done it, and now we have. Today is a historic day for all Madridistas, for the players, for me, for all our family. But saying this, you know how it is. Next year will be much more difficult. We will have to work a lot to try and win again. But today we can say we are a very good team, and we deserved to win La Liga and the Champions League. It was not easy." He also felt that "a lot of hard work" was the reason behind the team's success. Zidane also revealed that he had instructed his players to "keep going, but to play a bit higher up the pitch, and to keep the ball" during the half-time team talk.

Ramos said he was proud that Madrid had "kept their date with history" and felt it was because of the harmonious relationship among the players. Madrid's captain said, "We are tremendously proud of this team, and this institution. We had a date with history and were really looking forward to it. For 59 years we had not achieved the double, and nobody had ever won two Champions Leagues in a row. We were able to keep a dressing room without any jealousies and that was key. Success does not come by coincidence. We are a great group, headed by a great coach in Zidane. Three Champions Leagues in four years is crazy." Kroos revealed that he did not believe that Madrid would be able to successfully defend the trophy saying, "I didn't expect it would be possible to defend this title as it's so difficult to win it once. But to do it twice in a row is unbelievable. To win it three times in the last four years means a lot. It means it's not only a good team on the pitch but off the pitch. It's like that and I'm happy to be part of the team." Kroos also pointed out that Juventus had only conceded three goals in their entire Champions League campaign, and that scoring four against them in the final was a sign of Madrid's quality.

Modrić said that Madrid's performance in the first half was because they had "dropped back too much". He felt that the team's performance improved in the second half after Zidane instructed them to become "more aggressive" and "to not allow Juve to keep the ball easily". Cardiff native Bale stated that winning the title in his hometown was a "great feeling". He also stated that he had no regrets about not being able to start the match, and was happy to have been able to play.

== 2017 Turin stampede ==
During a viewing event for the match at the Piazza San Carlo in Turin, a robbery attempt followed by a loud bang caused panic, and a subsequent stampede killed three people, and at least 1,672 people were injured. On 14 May 2019, the victims of the tragedy were commemorated with a plaque in the piazza.

== See also ==
- 1998 UEFA Champions League final – contested by same teams
- 2017 UEFA Europa League final
- 2017 UEFA Women's Champions League final
- 2015–16 Juventus FC season
- 2015–16 Real Madrid CF season
- Juventus FC in international football
- Real Madrid CF in international football
