= Robert Jonquet =

French footballer (1925–2008)

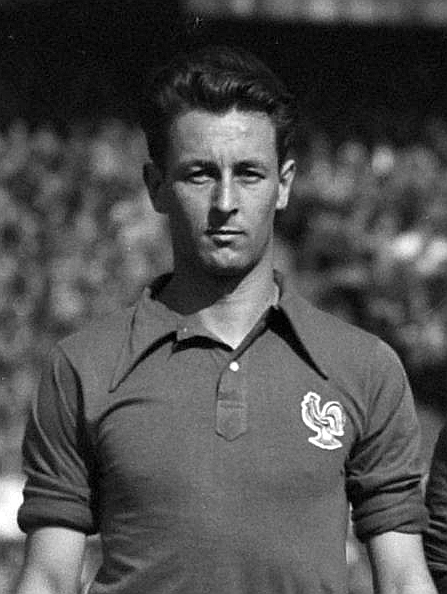
- Jonquet in 1949

Personal information
- Full name: Robert Henri Jonquet
- Date of birth: 3 May 1925
- Place of birth: Paris, France
- Date of death: 17 December 2008 (aged 83)
- Place of death: Reims, France
- Height: 1.76 m (5 ft 9 in)
- Position: Defender

Youth career
- 1937–1941: Robinson
- 1941–1942: Châtenay-Malabry
- 1941–1942: SS Voltaire de Paris
- 1942–1945: Reims

Senior career*
Years	Team	Apps	(Gls)
1945–1960	Reims	502	(9)
1960–1962	Strasbourg	55	(3)
Total		557	(12)

International career
1948–1960	France	58	(0)

Managerial career
- 1961–1964: Strasbourg
- 1964–1967: Reims
- Romilly-sur-Seine
- Épernay
- 1978–1980: Châlons-sur-Marne
- 1980–1981: Reims
Medal record
Representing France
FIFA World Cup
Third place	1958
- * Club domestic league appearances and goals

Robert Henri Jonquet (French: [ʁɔbɛʁ ʒɔ̃kɛ]; 3 May 1925 – 17 December 2008) was a French footballer who played as a defender. He played the majority of his professional career for the club Reims, winning five French championships and appearing in two European Cup finals. He is considered one of the best central defenders of his time.

Nicknamed "The Hero of Highbury" after an outstanding individual performance against England in London in 1951, Jonquet was integral to the France national team of the 1950s, playing at the World Cup finals of 1954 and 1958.

== Early life ==
Robert Henri Jonquet was born on 3 May 1925 in the 14th arrondissement of Paris.

== Playing career ==
=== 1946–1956 ===
During his youth, Jonquet played in the surrounding countryside of southern Paris in Châtenay-Malabry, and afterwards for the Société Sportive Voltaire. In 1946–47, he played his first season at Reims in the division 1. He became a first-team player, and in the spring 1947, he was called up for the first time to the France national team. Jonquet was relatively short (1.76 m) for his playing position, but as a libero, played with elegance and talent in the number 5 shirt, rather than in the mould of a typical centre-back "destroyer".

In the 1948–49 season he won his first French championship, 1950 the Coupe de France, followed in 1953 by his second French championship and the Latin Cup. In the year after he participated with Les Bleus in its first World Cup finals in Switzerland; in 1955 he won the French championship again, the French Supercup, was finalist in the Latin Cup and the following year (1956) reached with Reims the final of the newly born European Cup, losing to Real Madrid 4–3. Two further high points of these years took place on international fields: in October 1951 with France he played in London against England (which included Alf Ramsey and Billy Wright). Jonquet's superb game helped France obtain a 2–2 draw, and on the next morning a newspaper headline referred to him as "The Hero of Highbury". The "hero" also played in a European selection which defeated England in a friendly match in 1955.

=== A main player in one of the best teams of Europe ===
Robert Jonquet's fellow players with Reims during the 1950s: between goalkeeper (Dominique Colonna) and offensive players (Raymond Kopa, Michel Hidalgo, Léon Glovacki, Jean Vincent, Just Fontaine, Roger Piantoni, René Bliard) and safe defensive players such as Roger Marche, Armand Penverne, Albert Batteux, Michel Leblond, Jean Wendling – and evenly over one decade for Jonquet, who is the only players who played in two finals of the European Cup as well as two finals of the Latin Cup. Albert Batteux by the way supported Jonquet career over this time in three different ways: as a fellow players (until 1950), as a manager (1950–1959) and as France national football team coach (starting from 1955).

=== 1957–1961 ===
The 1957–58 season held further titles but also included probably the blackest hour for Jonquet. With Reims he won the treble of the French Championships Cup and Super Cup. In addition he participated in its second soccer world championship, at 1958 FIFA World Cup in Sweden where France finished third. However its misfortune in the semi-final (see below) prevented Jonquet's participation in the match for third place (6–3 against Germany).

After the second European Cup final against rival Real Madrid (1959, 2–0 loss) Raymond Kopa returned from Los Merengues to Reims – and Jonquet won his fifth French championship in 1960 and his third Super Cup. In this summer he retired at age 35 from France and moved to Racing Strasbourg in the second division, helping them to promote to the top division division 1 in 1961 – his final success as a player.

=== International career ===
Between April 1948 and July 1960 Robert Jonquet played 58 matches for France and captained them. He participated 1954 FIFA World Cup (one match) and 1958 FIFA World Cup (five matches as the team captain). In Sweden his injury in the semi-final against Brazil after 35 minutes, following an impact with Vavá, all but incapacitated him. In the half-time break – substitutes at that time not yet permitted – the team physician injected a pain-satisfying syringe, and Jonquet was able to stand on two legs. He spent the second half more or less useless and hobbling on the left wing. Indeed, he had broken its fibula. But five months later he came back in the national team.

He played his last match at Euro 1960 against Czechoslovakia.

== Post-playing career ==
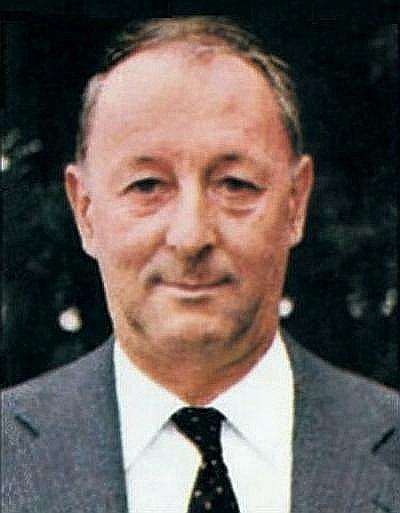
Jonquet in 1980

At RC Strasbourg, Jonquet moved from the playing field to the coaching sidelines, enjoying a spell with Reims and afterwards with a small teams, Romilly-sur-Seine, Épernay and Châlons-sur-Marne. He was very disappointed with the rise of money in football, missing his time at Stade de Reims. He died on 17 December 2008 in Reims, Marne. His club Reims gave his name to a stand of their stadium Auguste Delaune.

== Honours ==
Reims

- Division 1: 1948–49, 1952–53, 1954–55, 1957–58, 1959–60; runner-up: 1946–47, 1953–54
- Coupe de France: 1949–50, 1957–58
- Trophée des Champions: 1955, 1958, 1960
- Latin Cup: 1953; runner-up: 1955
- European Cup runner-up: 1955–56, 1958–59
