= 1956 European Cup final =

- Real Madrid, champions
- Event: 1955–56 European Cup
Real Madrid	Reims
(Spain)	(France)
4	3
- Date: 13 June 1956
- Venue: Parc des Princes, Paris
- Referee: Arthur Edward Ellis (England)
- Attendance: 38,239

The 1956 European Cup final was the inaugural final in the pan-European football competition, now known as the UEFA Champions League, to determine the winners of the 1955–56 European Cup. It was contested by Real Madrid of Spain and Stade de Reims of France, and played at the Parc des Princes in Paris on 13 June 1956 in front of 38,000 people. Real Madrid reached the final by beating Italian side AC Milan 5–4 on aggregate, whereas Reims beat Scottish club Hibernian 3–0 on aggregate. The match finished 4–3 to Real Madrid, who went on to record an unrivalled five consecutive European Cup titles. The match started brightly for Reims, with Michel Leblond and Jean Templin scoring to make it 2–0 inside 10 minutes, but by half-time, Madrid had levelled the scores through goals from Alfredo Di Stéfano and Héctor Rial. Reims took the lead again on 62 minutes through Michel Hidalgo, but when Marquitos and Rial scored in the 67th and 79th minutes respectively, Reims could no longer respond, winning Madrid the first ever European Cup/Champions League title, the first of five consecutive titles that they won.

== Route to the final ==
Real Madrid				Round	Reims			
Opponent	Agg.	1st leg	2nd leg		Opponent	Agg.	1st leg	2nd leg
(Switzerland) Servette	7–0	2–0 (A)	5–0 (H)	First round	(Denmark) AGF Aarhus	4–2	2–0 (A)	2–2 (H)
(Socialist Federal Republic of Yugoslavia) Partizan	4–3	4–0 (H)	0–3 (A)	Quarter-finals	(Hungary) Vörös Lobogó	8–6	4–2 (H)	4–4 (A)
(Italy) Milan	5–4	4–2 (H)	1–2 (A)	Semi-finals	(Scotland) Hibernian	3–0	2–0 (H)	1–0 (A)

=== Real Madrid ===
Real Madrid entered the European Cup competition as the title winners of the 1954–55 La Liga. In the opening round, they were drawn against Swiss champions Servette. After they secured a 2–0 victory away from home in the first leg, they secured a 5–0 victory at the Santiago Bernabéu Stadium with Alfredo Di Stéfano scoring two goals in the victory. In the quarter-finals they were drawn against Yugoslavian side FK Partizan who had finished fifth in the previous season. In the opening leg at home, Heliodoro Castaño Pedrosa scored two goals as fellow goals from Francisco Gento and Alfredo Di Stéfano gave Real Madrid a four goal lead heading into the away leg in Belgrade. Partizan won second leg 3–0, but that was not enough to advance to the semi-finals. There, Real Madrid won the first home leg against AC Milan and with two-goal lead could afford a second leg 2–1 defeat at the San Siro.

=== Stade de Reims ===
Reims entered the European Cup competition as the title winners of the 1954–55 French Division 1. In the opening round, they were drawn against Danish champions AGF Aarhus. In the first away leg they secured a 2–0 victory thanks to a brace from Léon Glovacki, before a 2–2 draw at the Stade Auguste-Delaune. In the quarter-finals they were drawn against Hungarian side Vörös Lobogó who had finished 2nd in the previous season. In the opening leg at home, Michel Leblond scored two goals as fellow goals from Léon Glovacki and René Bliard gave Reims a two-goal lead heading into the away leg at Budapest. There, a tight match ensured a 4–4 draw, which saw Reims advance to the semi-finals, where they defeated Scottish Hibernian in both legs, reaching final undefeated.

== Match ==
=== Details ===
13 June 1956
20:30 CET

Real Madrid (Spain)	4–3	(France) Reims
Di Stéfano 14'; Rial 30', 79'; Marquitos 67'	Report	Leblond 6'; Templin 10'; Hidalgo 62'

Parc des Princes, Paris
Attendance: 38,239
Referee: Arthur Edward Ellis (England)

Real Madrid	Reims

GK	1	(Spain) Juan Alonso
RB	2	(Spain) Ángel Atienza
LB	3	(Spain) Rafael Lesmes
RH	4	(Spain) Miguel Muñoz (c)
CH	5	(Spain) Marquitos
LH	6	(Spain) José María Zárraga
OR	7	(Spain) Joseíto
IR	8	(Spain) Ramón Marsal
CF	9	(Argentina) Alfredo Di Stéfano (Note: Di Stéfano was a native Argentine that in October 1956 (four months following this match) became a naturalised citizen of Spain. He started playing on the Spain national football team in 1957.)
IL	10	(Spain) Héctor Rial
OL	11	(Spain) Paco Gento
Manager:
(Spain) José Villalonga

GK	1	(France) René-Jean Jacquet
RB	2	(France) Simon Zimny
LB	3	(France) Raoul Giraudo
RH	4	(France) Michel Leblond
CH	5	(France) Robert Jonquet (c)
LH	6	(France) Robert Siatka
OR	7	(France) Michel Hidalgo
IR	8	(France) Léon Glowacki
CF	9	(France) Raymond Kopa
IL	10	(France) René Bliard
OL	11	(France) Jean Templin
Manager:
(France) Albert Batteux

Assistant referees:
J. Parkinson (England)
Tommy Cooper (England)

== See also ==
- 1955–56 Real Madrid CF season
- 1959 European Cup final – contested between same teams
- Real Madrid CF in international football
