= 2016 UEFA Champions League final =

Football match in Milan, Italy

- Match programme cover
- Event: 2015–16 UEFA Champions League
Real Madrid	Atlético Madrid
(Spain)	(Spain)
1	1
- After extra time Real Madrid won 5–3 on penalties
- Date: 28 May 2016
- Venue: San Siro, Milan
- Man of the Match: Sergio Ramos (Real Madrid)
- Referee: Mark Clattenburg (England)
- Attendance: 71,942
- Weather: Cloudy; 27 °C (81 °F); 45% humidity

The 2016 UEFA Champions League final was the final match of the 2015–16 UEFA Champions League, the 61st season of Europe's premier club football tournament organised by UEFA, and the 24th season since it was renamed from the European Champion Clubs' Cup to the UEFA Champions League. It was played at the Stadio San Siro in Milan, Italy, on 28 May 2016, between Spanish teams Real Madrid and Atlético Madrid, in a repeat of the 2014 final. It was the second time in the tournament's history that both finalists were from the same city. Real Madrid won 5–3 on a penalty shoot-out after a 1–1 draw at the end of extra time, securing a record-extending 11th title in the competition.

Real Madrid earned the right to play against the winners of the 2015–16 UEFA Europa League, Sevilla, in the 2016 UEFA Super Cup. They also qualified to enter the semi-finals of the 2016 FIFA Club World Cup as the UEFA representative, ultimately triumphing in both competitions.

== Venue ==
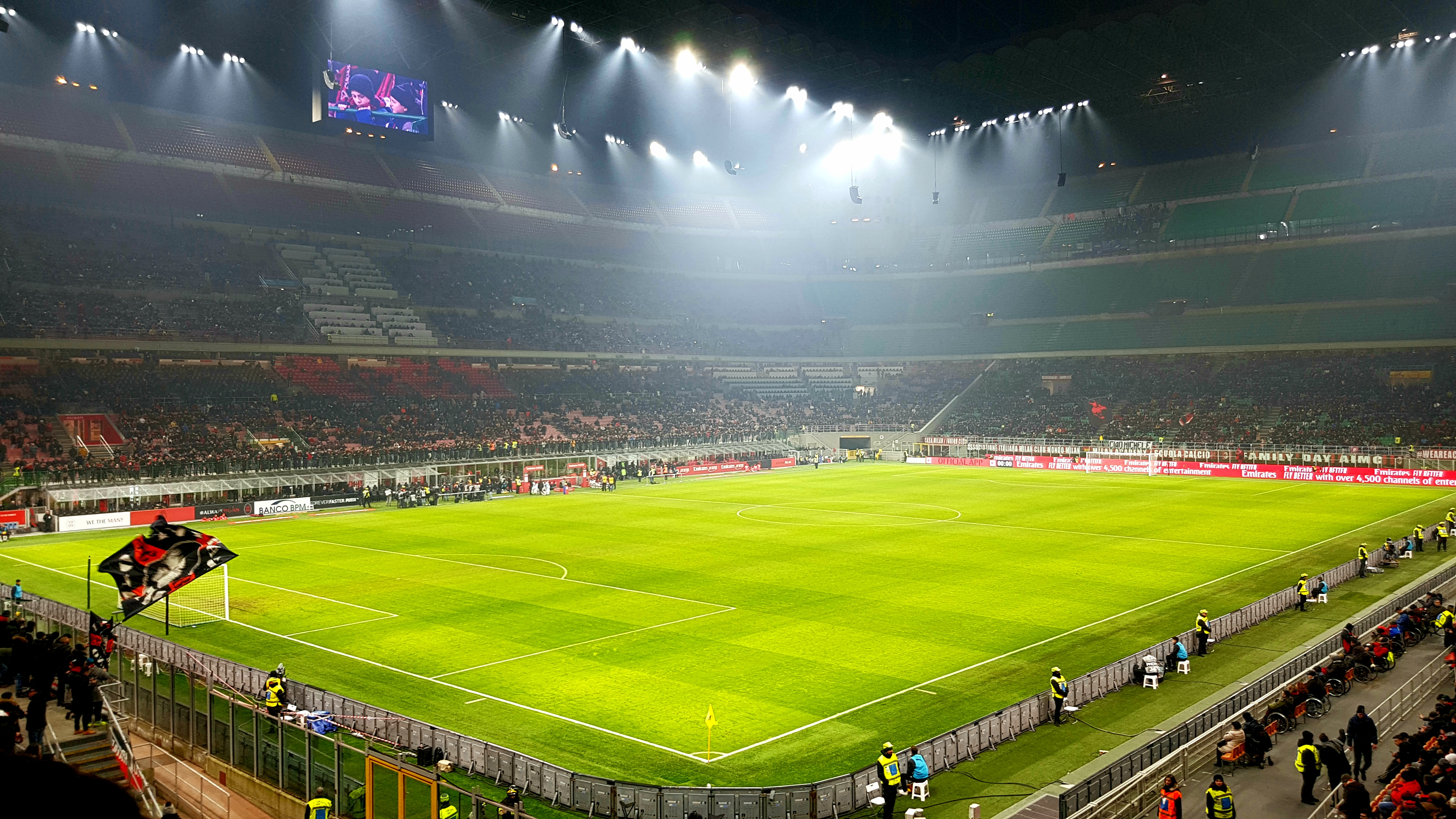
The Stadio San Siro in Milan was selected to host the final in September 2014.

The Stadio San Siro, officially known as Stadio Giuseppe Meazza, was announced as the venue of the final at the UEFA Executive Committee meeting in Nyon, Switzerland, on 18 September 2014, the fourth European Cup/Champions League final hosted at the stadium following those in 1965, 1970 and 2001.

The San Siro was built in 1925, opened in 1926 as the home of Milan, and was sold to the city in 1935. Internazionale became tenants in 1947, and the stadium has been shared by the two clubs ever since, with Inter winning the first European Cup final played at the stadium in 1965. The stadium was used as a venue in the 1934 FIFA World Cup, UEFA Euro 1980, and the 1990 FIFA World Cup. Its current capacity is 80,018, but is reduced to just under 80,000 seats for UEFA competitions.

The 2016 final marked the first time a final has been held at the San Siro when neither of its tenants were able to win the competition, as Milan and Internazionale both failed to qualify for any European competitions after their performance in the 2014–15 Serie A.

== Background ==
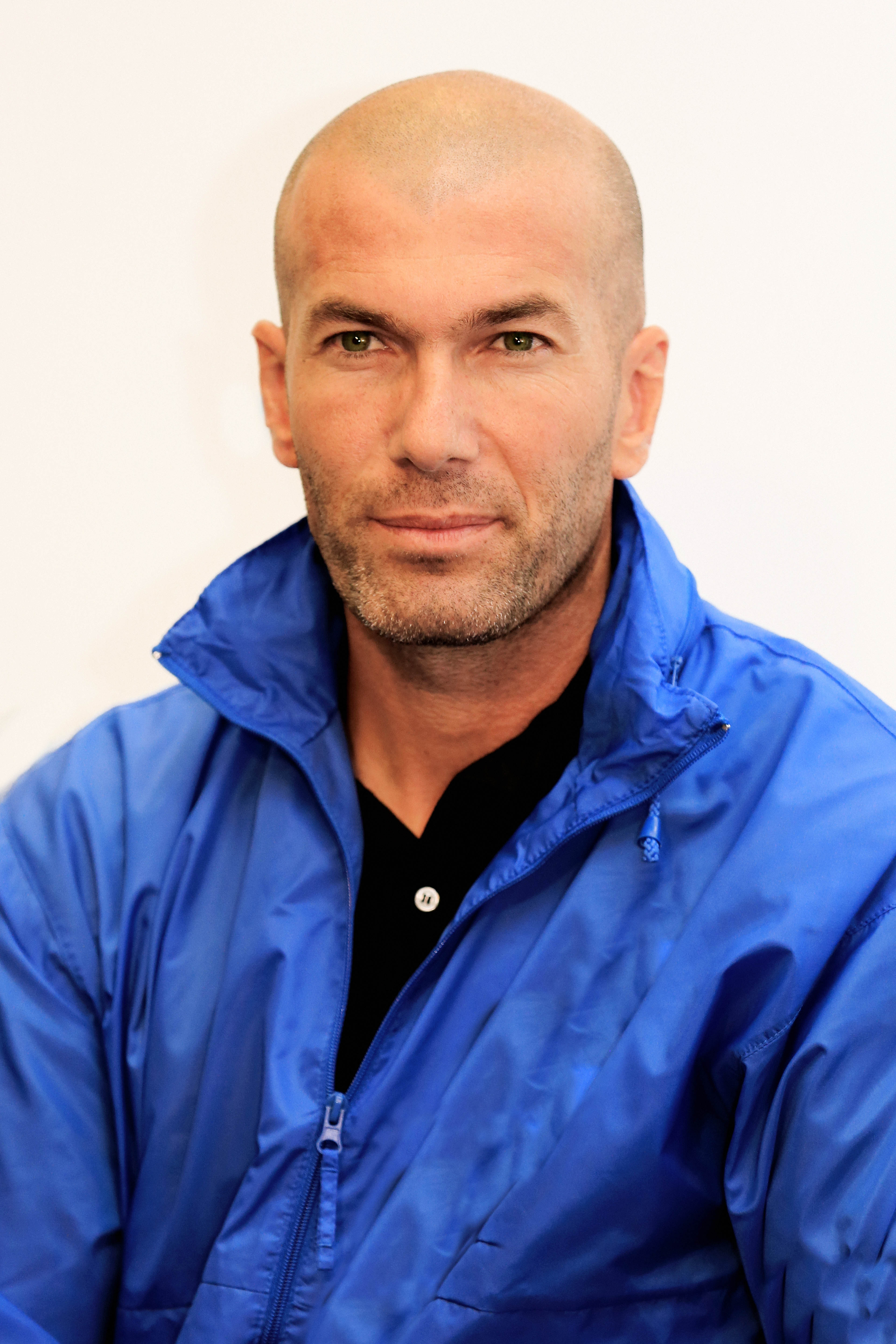
Real Madrid manager Zinedine Zidane won the Champions League while playing for the club in 2002

This final was the sixth tournament final to feature two teams from the same association, the third all-Spanish final, and the second between teams from the same city, fielding exactly the two teams that faced each other in the 2014 final, making it the seventh repeated final pairing. The all-Madrid final also guaranteed the city of Madrid becoming the most successful city in the European Cup with 11 wins and 17 final appearances, and also in all UEFA club competitions with 16 wins, overtaking the city of Milan with 10 wins and 16 final appearances in the European Cup and 15 wins in all UEFA club competitions.

Real Madrid reached a record 14th final after a 1–0 aggregate win against Manchester City, with a chance to win a record 11th title. Previously, they won finals in 1956, 1957, 1958, 1959, 1960, 1966, 1998, 2000, 2002, and 2014, and lost in 1962, 1964 and 1981. This was also their 18th final in all UEFA club competitions, having also played in two Cup Winners' Cup finals (losing in 1971 and 1983) and two UEFA Cup finals (winning in 1985 and 1986). Their manager, Zinedine Zidane, who scored the winning goal for Real Madrid in the 2002 final, was aiming to become the seventh man to win the Champions League as both player and manager, joining Miguel Muñoz, Giovanni Trapattoni, Johan Cruyff, Carlo Ancelotti, Frank Rijkaard and Pep Guardiola. The team had had a disastrous first half of the season, being left out of contention to win La Liga, sacking newly-appointed Rafael Benítez in January.

Atlético Madrid reached their third European Cup final after defeating Bayern Munich on away goals (2–2 on aggregate). Their previous two European Cup finals in 1974 and 2014 both ended in defeats, to Bayern Munich and Real Madrid respectively. Atlético Madrid had also played in three Cup Winners' Cup finals (winning in 1962, and losing in 1963 and 1986) and two Europa League finals (winning in 2010 and 2012), with their most recent Europa League triumph in 2012 led by current coach Diego Simeone, widely attributed as having brought Atlético Madrid back to glory, but had yet to win a Champions League. He had the chance to join fellow Argentinians Luis Carniglia and Helenio Herrera as the only non-European coaches to win the European Cup/Champions League. Had they won the final, they would have become the first Spanish club and the fifth club overall to have won all three major European trophies at the time (European Cup/Champions League, UEFA Cup/Europa League and the now-defunct Cup Winners' Cup). On the other hand, if they were to lose, they would become the first team to lose their first three European Cup finals.

Apart from the 2014 final, won by Real Madrid 4–1 after extra time, the only previous Madrid Derby matches in European competitions were in the 1958–59 European Cup semi-finals, where Real Madrid won 2–1 in a replay, after a 2–2 aggregate draw, and in the 2014–15 UEFA Champions League quarter-finals, where Real Madrid won 1–0 on aggregate.

=== Previous finals ===
In the following table, finals until 1992 were in the European Cup era, since 1993 were in the UEFA Champions League era.

Team	Previous finals appearances (bold indicates winners)
(Spain) Atlético Madrid	2 (1974, 2014)
(Spain) Real Madrid	13 (**1956**, **1957**, **1958**, **1959**, **1960**, 1962, 1964, **1966**, 1981, **1998**, **2000**, **2002**, **2014**)

== Route to the final ==
Note: In all results below, the score of the finalist is given first (H: home; A: away).

(Spain) Real Madrid				Round	(Spain) Atlético Madrid			
Opponent	Result			Group stage	Opponent	Result		
(Ukraine) Shakhtar Donetsk	4–0 (H)			Matchday 1	(Turkey) Galatasaray	2–0 (A)		
(Sweden) Malmö FF	2–0 (A)			Matchday 2	(Portugal) Benfica	1–2 (H)		
(France) Paris Saint-Germain	0–0 (A)			Matchday 3	(Kazakhstan) Astana	4–0 (H)		
(France) Paris Saint-Germain	1–0 (H)			Matchday 4	(Kazakhstan) Astana	0–0 (A)		
(Ukraine) Shakhtar Donetsk	4–3 (A)			Matchday 5	(Turkey) Galatasaray	2–0 (H)		
(Sweden) Malmö FF	8–0 (H)			Matchday 6	(Portugal) Benfica	2–1 (A)		
Group A winners: Pos / Team / Pld / Pts; 1 / (Spain) Real Madrid / 6 / 16; 2 / (France) Paris Saint-Germain / 6 / 13; 3 / (Ukraine) Shakhtar Donetsk / 6 / 3; 4 / (Sweden) Malmö FF / 6 / 3; Source: UEFA				Final standings	Group C winners: Pos / Team / Pld / Pts; 1 / (Spain) Atlético Madrid / 6 / 13; 2 / (Portugal) Benfica / 6 / 10; 3 / (Turkey) Galatasaray / 6 / 5; 4 / (Kazakhstan) Astana / 6 / 4; Source: UEFA			
Opponent	Agg.	1st leg	2nd leg	Knockout phase	Opponent	Agg.	1st leg	2nd leg
(Italy) Roma	4–0	2–0 (A)	2–0 (H)	Round of 16	(Netherlands) PSV Eindhoven	0–0 (8–7 p)	0–0 (A)	0–0 (a.e.t.) (H)
(Germany) VfL Wolfsburg	3–2	0–2 (A)	3–0 (H)	Quarter-finals	(Spain) Barcelona	3–2	1–2 (A)	2–0 (H)
(England) Manchester City	1–0	0–0 (A)	1–0 (H)	Semi-finals	(Germany) Bayern Munich	2–2 (a)	1–0 (H)	1–2 (A)

== Pre-match ==
=== Ambassadors ===
Javier Zanetti	Paolo Maldini

The ambassadors for the final were former Argentine international Javier Zanetti, who won the Champions League with Internazionale against Bayern Munich in 2010, and former Italian international Paolo Maldini, who won five European Cups with Milan.

=== Logo ===
UEFA unveiled the brand identity of the final on 27 August 2015 in Monaco ahead of the group stage draw. The logo features the Milan landmark Galleria Vittorio Emanuele II.

=== Ticketing ===
With a stadium capacity of 71,500, a total amount of 46,000 tickets were available to fans and the general public, with the two finalist teams receiving 20,000 tickets each and with 6,000 tickets being available for sale to fans worldwide via UEFA.com from 1 to 14 March 2016 in four price categories: €440, €320, €160 and €70. The remaining tickets were allocated to the local organising committee, UEFA and national associations, commercial partners and broadcasters, and to serve the corporate hospitality programme.

=== Opening ceremony ===
American singer Alicia Keys performed in the opening ceremony prior to the match, the first time the UEFA Champions League final featured a live music performance. The UEFA Champions League Anthem was performed by Italian tenor Andrea Bocelli.

=== Related events ===
The 2016 UEFA Women's Champions League final was held two days prior, on 26 May 2016, at the Mapei Stadium – Città del Tricolore in Reggio Emilia, Italy.

The annual UEFA Champions Festival was held between 26–29 May 2016 at Milan's Piazza del Duomo.

== Match ==
=== Officials ===
In May 2016, English referee Mark Clattenburg was chosen to adjudicate the final. Joining him, were compatriots Simon Beck and Jake Collin as assistant referees, Andre Marriner and Anthony Taylor as additional assistant referees, Stuart Burt as reserve assistant referee, and Hungarian Viktor Kassai as fourth official.

=== Goal-line technology ===
The goal-line technology system Hawk-Eye was used for the match. This was the first UEFA Champions League final to employ goal-line technology, following approval by the UEFA Executive Committee in January 2016.

=== Summary ===
Real Madrid dominated possession in the early stages of the match. Six minutes into the game Gareth Bale delivered a free-kick into Atlético Madrid's penalty box, which found Casemiro. His goalbound shot was cleared off the line by goalkeeper Jan Oblak. Five minutes later, Dani Carvajal received the first yellow card of the match after a late tackle on Antoine Griezmann. In the 15th minute, Toni Kroos sent a free-kick into Atlético's penalty box, which was flicked on by Bale. In the subsequent scramble, Sergio Ramos touched the ball past Oblak to score for Real. Watching the goal back at half-time, referee Clattenburg realised that there had been an offside in the build-up to the goal and that it should not have stood.

In the 46th minute, Fernando Torres won a penalty kick for Atlético after a foul from behind from Pepe. Real Madrid goalkeeper Keylor Navas was shown a yellow card for delaying the kick. Griezmann took the penalty but his shot missed the goal, with the ball ricocheting off the crossbar. Substitute Yannick Carrasco latched onto a cross by Juanfran from the right to equalise from close range for Atlético in the 79th minute. The scoreline remained the same at the end of 90 minutes to send the match into extra time.

After a goalless extra 30 minutes, the game was settled by a penalty shoot-out. Juanfran missed Atlético's fourth penalty, hitting the post, thus allowing Cristiano Ronaldo to seal Real Madrid's 11th Champions League title.

=== Details ===
The "home" team (for administrative purposes) was determined by an additional draw held after the semi-final draw, which was held on 15 April 2016 at UEFA headquarters in Nyon, Switzerland.

28 May 2016
20:45 UTC+2

Real Madrid (Spain)	1–1 (a.e.t.)	(Spain) Atlético Madrid
Ramos 15'	Report	Carrasco 79'
Penalties
Vázquez (penalty scored); Marcelo (penalty scored); Bale (penalty scored); Ramos (penalty scored); Ronaldo (penalty scored)	5–3	(penalty scored) Griezmann; (penalty scored) Gabi; (penalty scored) Saúl; (penalty missed) Juanfran

Stadio San Siro, Milan
Attendance: 71,942
Referee: Mark Clattenburg (England)

Real Madrid	Atlético Madrid

GK	1	(Costa Rica) Keylor Navas	(yellow card) 47'
RB	15	(Spain) Dani Carvajal	(yellow card) 11'	(substituted off) 52'
CB	4	(Spain) Sergio Ramos (c)	(yellow card) 90+3'
CB	3	(Portugal) Pepe	(yellow card) 112'
LB	12	(Brazil) Marcelo
DM	14	(Brazil) Casemiro	(yellow card) 79'
CM	19	(Croatia) Luka Modrić
CM	8	(Germany) Toni Kroos		(substituted off) 72'
RF	11	(Wales) Gareth Bale
CF	9	(France) Karim Benzema		(substituted off) 77'
LF	7	(Portugal) Cristiano Ronaldo
Substitutes:
GK	13	(Spain) Kiko Casilla
DF	6	(Spain) Nacho
DF	23	(Brazil) Danilo	(yellow card) 93'	(substituted on) 52'
MF	10	(Colombia) James Rodríguez
MF	18	(Spain) Lucas Vázquez		(substituted on) 77'
MF	22	(Spain) Isco		(substituted on) 72'
FW	20	(Spain) Jesé
Manager:
(France) Zinedine Zidane

GK	13	(Slovenia) Jan Oblak
RB	20	(Spain) Juanfran
CB	15	(Montenegro) Stefan Savić
CB	2	(Uruguay) Diego Godín
LB	3	(Brazil) Filipe Luís		(substituted off) 109'
RM	17	(Spain) Saúl
CM	14	(Spain) Gabi (c)	(yellow card) 90+3'
CM	12	(Argentina) Augusto Fernández		(substituted off) 46'
LM	6	(Spain) Koke		(substituted off) 116'
SS	7	(France) Antoine Griezmann
CF	9	(Spain) Fernando Torres	(yellow card) 61'
Substitutes:
GK	1	(Spain) Miguel Ángel Moyá
DF	19	(France) Lucas Hernandez		(substituted on) 109'
DF	24	(Uruguay) José Giménez
MF	5	(Portugal) Tiago
MF	21	(Belgium) Yannick Carrasco		(substituted on) 46'
MF	22	(Ghana) Thomas Partey		(substituted on) 116'
FW	16	(Argentina) Ángel Correa
Manager:
(Argentina) Diego Simeone

Man of the Match:
Sergio Ramos (Real Madrid)

Assistant referees:
Simon Beck (England)
Jake Collin (England)
Fourth official:
Viktor Kassai (Hungary)
Additional assistant referees:
Anthony Taylor (England)
Andre Marriner (England)
Reserve assistant referee:
Stuart Burt (England)

Match rules

- 90 minutes.
- 30 minutes of extra time if necessary.
- Penalty shoot-out if scores still level.
- Seven named substitutes, of which up to three may be used.

=== Statistics ===
First half
Statistic	Real Madrid	Atlético Madrid
Goals scored	1	0
Total shots	5	5
Shots on target	2	3
Saves	3	1
Ball possession	48%	52%
Corner kicks	1	1
Fouls committed	6	6
Offsides	0	1
Yellow cards	1	0
Red cards	0	0

Second half
Statistic	Real Madrid	Atlético Madrid
Goals scored	0	1
Total shots	9	10
Shots on target	4	1
Saves	0	4
Ball possession	45%	55%
Corner kicks	3	1
Fouls committed	8	7
Offsides	0	1
Yellow cards	3	2
Red cards	0	0

Extra time
Statistic	Real Madrid	Atlético Madrid
Goals scored	0	0
Total shots	11	3
Shots on target	2	0
Saves	0	2
Ball possession	44%	56%
Corner kicks	3	4
Fouls committed	4	3
Offsides	0	0
Yellow cards	2	0
Red cards	0	0

Overall
Statistic	Real Madrid	Atlético Madrid
Goals scored	1	1
Total shots	25	18
Shots on target	8	4
Saves	3	7
Ball possession	46%	54%
Corner kicks	7	6
Fouls committed	18	16
Offsides	0	2
Yellow cards	6	2
Red cards	0	0

== Post-match ==
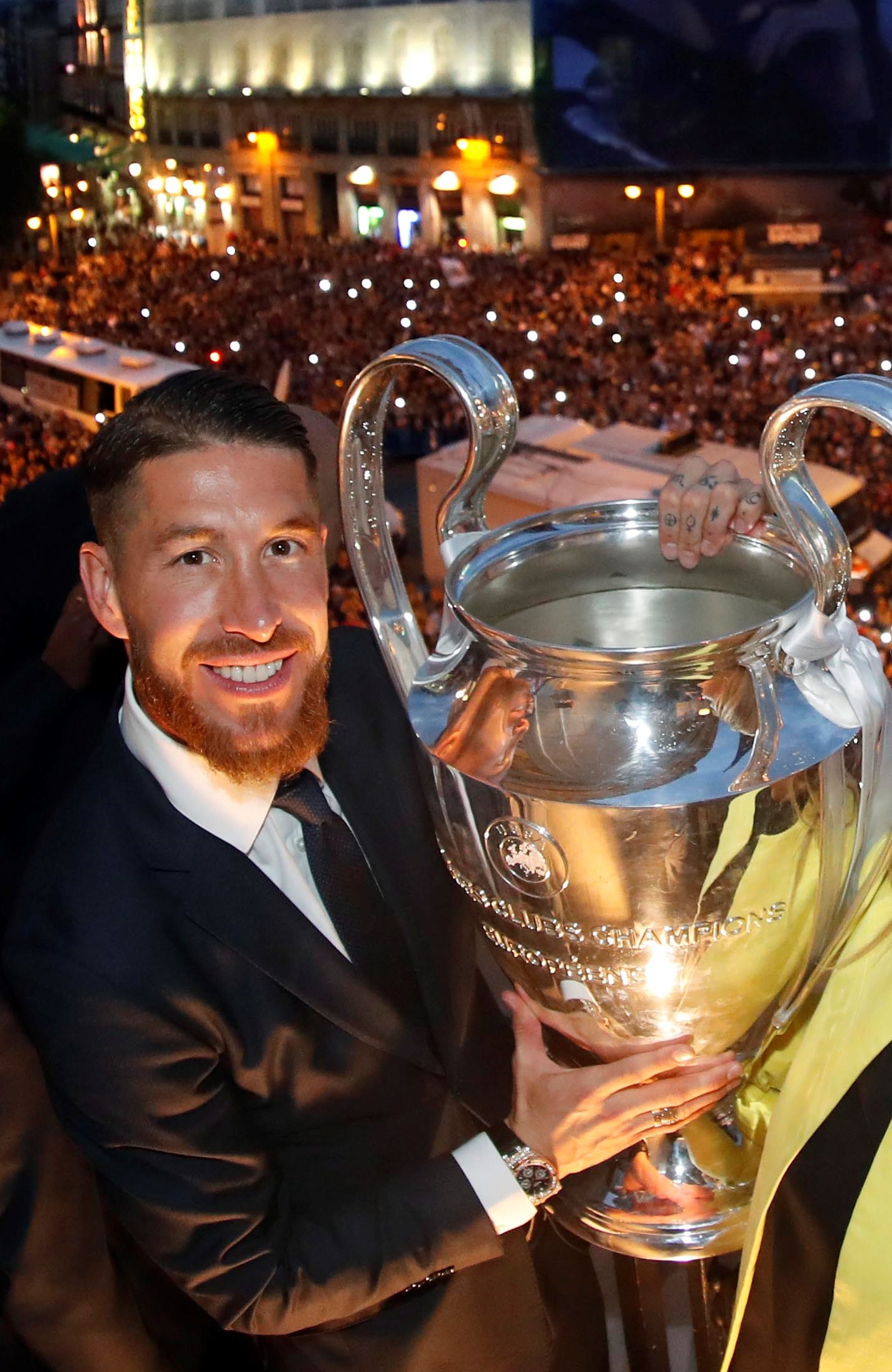
Man of the Match winner Sergio Ramos holding the Champions League trophy during celebrations in Madrid.

Ramos, who scored the opening goal of the match, became the fifth player to score in two Champions League finals. He had not scored in the competition since scoring the equaliser against Atlético Madrid in the 2014 final. Carrasco's second-half equaliser made him the first Belgian to score in a Champions League final. Real Madrid coach Zidane became the first French coach to win the Champions League and the seventh person to win the Champions League as a player and as a coach.

During the match, fans at an Iraqi Real Madrid fan club were attacked for the second time, bringing the combined death toll to at least 29. In the aftermath of the attack, club president Florentino Pérez dedicated Real Madrid's victory to the fans that were killed and other Iraqi fans of the club, including others who have been killed by the Islamic State of Iraq and the Levant. Players had previously worn black armbands and observed moment of silence after the first attack.

=== Reactions ===
Zidane expressed his pride at being Real Madrid coach and winning the Champions League with the club as a player, as assistant coach and now as head coach. Simeone congratulated Real Madrid on their victory. When asked if he would continue as the coach of Atlético Madrid, Simeone replied, "My plan is to think. That's all."

Ronaldo told the media after the match that he had requested to take the fifth penalty because he "had a vision" that he would score the winning goal. Luka Modrić told the media he was happy and proud of the win, and that the team had shown character until the end.

== See also ==
- 2014 UEFA Champions League final – contested by same teams
- 2018 UEFA Super Cup – contested by same teams
- 2016 UEFA Europa League final
- 2016 UEFA Women's Champions League final
- 2015–16 Atlético Madrid season
- 2015–16 Real Madrid CF season
- Atlético Madrid in European football
- Real Madrid CF in international football
- Spanish football clubs in international competitions
