= Robert Siatka =

French footballer (born 1934)

Personal information
- Date of birth: 20 June 1934 (age 92)
- Place of birth: Le Martinet, France
- Position: Defender

Youth career
- ?–1953: Olympique Alès

Senior career*
Years	Team	Apps	(Gls)
1953–1964	Reims		
1964–1965	Nantes		

International career
1960	France	1	(0)

Managerial career
- Olympique Alès
- 1968–1970: Avignon
- 1970–1972: FC Bourges
- 1973–1974: FC Bourges
- * Club domestic league appearances and goals

Robert Siatka (born 20 June 1934) is a French former footballer who played as a defender. He played for France in the 1960 European Nations' Cup.

== Personal life ==
Siatka was born in France, and is of Polish descent. He is best known in club football for playing with Reims in their 1956 and 1959 European Cup finals.

With the deaths of Michel Hidalgo of France, on 26 March 2020, and Paco Gento of Spain on 18 January 2022, Siatka is the only living player from the first ever European Cup final.
