= Albert Batteux =

French footballer and manager (1919–2003)

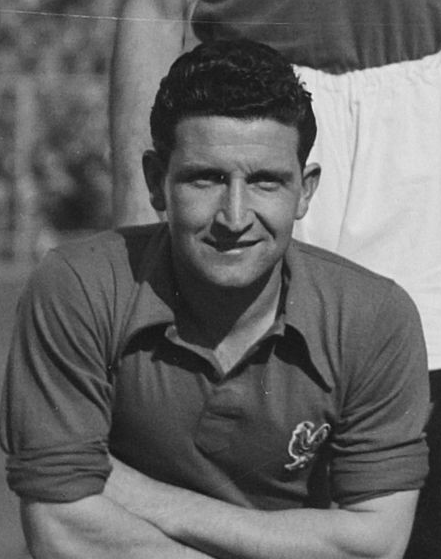
- Batteux as France player in 1949

Personal information
- Date of birth: 2 July 1919
- Place of birth: Reims, France
- Date of death: 28 February 2003 (aged 83)
- Place of death: Meylan, France
- Height: 1.76 m (5 ft 9 in)
- Position: Midfielder

Youth career
- 1930–1937: Stade Portelois

Senior career*
Years	Team	Apps	(Gls)
1937–1952	Reims	287	(35)
1943–1944	→ ÉF Reims-Champagne		

International career
1940	France military	1	(0)
1945–1949	France B	6	(1)
1948–1949	France	8	(1)

Managerial career
- 1950–1963: Reims
- 1955–1962: France
- 1963–1967: Grenoble
- 1967–1972: Saint-Étienne
- 1976–1977: AS Avignonnaise
- 1979: Nice
- 1980–1981: Marseille
- * Club domestic league appearances and goals

Albert Batteux (2 July 1919 – 28 February 2003) was a French football manager and footballer who played as a midfielder.

He is considered one of the greatest managers of the 20th-century, and the most successful manager in the history of French football, having won nine Division 1 titles with Reims and Saint-Étienne, as well as reaching two European Cup finals with Reims, and finishing third at the 1958 FIFA World Cup with the France national team, their best performance until they won the tournament in 1998.

== Early life and playing career ==
Born in Reims, Batteux grew up with 13 other siblings, while his father was a railway worker. During World War II, he was mobilized in southern France.

As a footballer, he spent his whole career as a midfielder with Division 2 side Stade de Reims, helping them win the French Division 1 title in the 1948–49 season, and the Coupe de France in the 1949–50 season.

=== International career ===
Batteux represented the France military national team in 1940, before later playing six matches for France's B team between 1945 and 1949.

In 1948, Batteux was called up to the France national team after RC Paris midfielder Ernest Vaast became unavailable. He made his debut on 6 June 1948, in a 4–2 defeat against Belgium in Brussels. Overall, he made eight appearances for the national team, scoring once.

== Managerial career ==
=== Stade de Reims ===
Following Reims's Coupe de France victory in 1950, the club's manager Henri Roessler stepped down, with club chairman Henri Germain offering the job to Batteux, who was only 31 at the time. During his early days at the club, he signed Raymond Kopa from Angers, and later Léon Glovacki from Troyes-Savinienne the following season, allowing Kopa to play as a striker. Following Kopa's departure to Real Madrid in 1956, he signed Just Fontaine from Nice as his replacement, before signing Roger Piantoni from Nancy the following year.

In total, he spent 13 years in charge of the club, reaching the European Cup final twice in 1956 and 1959, where they lost to Real Madrid both times.

=== France national team ===
In 1955, the French Football Federation appointed Batteux as the manager of the France national team. His first match in charge was a 2–1 win against Spain in Madrid, which he later claimed was the starting point for France's run into the 1958 FIFA World Cup.

At the 1958 FIFA World Cup, France reached the semi-finals, where they lost 5–2 to Brazil, before beating West Germany 6–3 in the third-place match. Overall, he coached over 50 matches for the national team between 1955 and 1962.

=== Post-Reims career ===
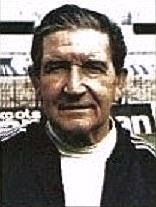
Batteux as the manager of Marseille in 1980.

In 1963, Batteux left Reims to join Division 2 side Grenoble. In 1967, despite offers from Atlético Madrid and the Swiss Football Association, he joined Saint-Étienne by the request of friend and former assistant Jean Snella. With Saint-Étienne, he won four Division 1 and two Coupe de France titles, before stepping down from the role in 1972. After leaving Saint-Étienne, he became the sporting director of Nancy Afterward, he coached Avignonnaise, Nice, and Marseille, before retiring in 1981, having managed over 650 Division 1 matches.

In 1975, he applied to be the France national team manager again following the departure of Ștefan Kovács, but was overlooked in favour of Michel Hidalgo.

== Legacy ==
Batteux's style of play gained the nickname 'Champagne football', which involved short passes and constant movement, and influenced managers like Michel Hidalgo, Claude Le Roy, Aimé Jacquet, and Robert Herbin.

== Death ==
Around 1993, Batteux was diagnosed with Alzheimer's disease. He died from the disease on 28 February 2003, at the age of 83. His funeral was held on 4 March in Grenoble.

In 2026, a biography about Batteaux written by Alain Colzy and Marc Barreaud, titled Albert Batteux, une autre idée du football was announced.

== Honours ==
=== Player ===
Reims

- Division 1: 1948–49
- Coupe de France: 1949–50

=== Manager ===
Reims

- Division 1: 1952–53, 1954–55, 1957–58, 1959–60, 1961–62
- Coupe de France: 1958
- Latin Cup: 1953
- European Cup runner-up: 1955–56, 1958–59

France

- FIFA World Cup third place: 1958
- UEFA European Championship fourth place: 1960

Saint-Étienne

- Division 1: 1966–67, 1967–68, 1968–69, 1969–70
- Coupe de France: 1968, 1970
