= 1959 European Cup final =

- Match programme cover
- Event: 1958–59 European Cup
Real Madrid	Reims
(Spain)	(France)
2	0
- Date: 3 June 1959
- Venue: Neckarstadion, Stuttgart
- Referee: Albert Dusch (West Germany)
- Attendance: 72,000

The 1959 European Cup final was a football match played at the Neckarstadion in Stuttgart, Germany on 3 June 1959 as the conclusion to the 1958–59 European Cup.

The match was contested by three-time defending champions Real Madrid of Spain, the only previous team to win the competition, and Stade de Reims of France and was a replay of the inaugural final in 1956.

Goals from Enrique Mateos and Alfredo Di Stéfano helped Real Madrid to a 2–0 win as they successfully defended their title to lift the trophy for the fourth consecutive year.

== Background ==
Real Madrid had won the first three editions of the European Cup in 1956, 1957 and 1958.

Stade de Reims had only once played in the European Cup before reaching the inaugural final in 1956 and remaining unbeaten in the tournament until the final.

In the inaugural season of the European Cup, Real Madrid and Reims met in the final which was played at the Parc des Princes in Paris, France on 13 June 1956. Early goals from Michel Leblond and Jean Templin gave Reims a 2–0 advantage after 10 minutes. Real Madrid rallied and goals from Alfredo Di Stéfano and Héctor Rial saw them level the score after half an hour. In the second half, Reims retook the lead through Michel Hidalgo but were pegged back by Marquitos. Rial scored his second of the game with 11 minutes to play as Real Madrid completed their comeback to win the match 4–3 and lift the trophy.

== Route to the final ==
(Spain) Real Madrid				Round	(France) Reims			
Opponent	Agg.	1st leg	2nd leg		Opponent	Agg.	1st leg	2nd leg
Bye				Prelim. round	(Northern Ireland) Ards	10–3	4–1 (A)	6–2 (H)
(Turkey) Beşiktaş	3–1	2–0 (H)	1–1 (A)	First round	(Finland) HPS	7–0	4–0 (H)	3–0 (A)
(Austria) Wiener Sport-Club	7–1	0–0 (A)	7–1 (H)	Quarter-finals	(Belgium) Standard Liège	3–2	0–2 (A)	3–0 (H)
(Spain) Atlético Madrid	2–2 (Replay: 2–1)	2–1 (H)	0–1 (A)	Semi-finals	(Switzerland) Young Boys	3–1	0–1 (A)	3–0 (H)

=== Real Madrid ===
Real Madrid qualified for the competition as defending champions and they were given a bye in the preliminary round.

In the first round, Real Madrid defeated Beşiktaş of Turkey 2–0 at home in the first leg before drawing the second leg 1–1 to advance 3–1 on aggregate.

Real Madrid then faced Wiener Sport-Club of Austria in the quarter-finals. After a goalless draw in the first leg in Vienna, Real Madrid won the second leg at home 7–1 to advance to the semi-finals.

In the semi-finals, Real Madrid faced local rivals Atlético Madrid. After winning the first leg 2–1 at home, Real Madrid lost the second leg 1–0 away which resulted in a tie, 2–2 on aggregate. As a result, a replay was held at a neutral venue in Zaragoza which Real Madrid won 2–1 to advance to the final.

=== Reims ===
Reims qualified for the competition as winners of the 1957–58 French Division 1.

In the preliminary round, Reims defeated Ards of Northern Ireland 4–1 away in the first leg and 6–2 at home in the second leg to progress 10–3 on aggregate.

Reims then faced Helsingin Palloseura (HPS) of Finland in the first round. After winning the first leg 4–0 at home, Reims won the second leg 3–0 away to progress 7–0 on aggregate.

Standard Liège of Belgium were Reims opponents in the quarter-finals. Despite losing the first leg away from hom 2–0, Reims came from behind to win the tie after a 3–0 win at home in the second leg, 3–2 on aggregate.

In the semi-finals, Reims faced Young Boys of Switzerland. Similar to the previous round, Reims lost the first leg 1–0 away from home but followed that up with a 3–0 home win in the second leg to advance to the final 3–1 on aggregate.

== Match ==
=== Details ===
3 June 1959
18:00 CEST

Real Madrid (Spain)	2–0	(France) Reims
Mateos 1'; Di Stéfano 47'	Report

Neckarstadion, Stuttgart
Attendance: 72,000
Referee: Albert Dusch (West Germany)

Real Madrid	Reims

GK	1	(Argentina) Rogelio Domínguez
RB	2	(Spain) Marquitos
CB	3	(Spain) José Santamaría (Note: Santamaría had amassed 20 caps for his native Uruguay from 1952 to 1957 and he represented Spain in international play since 1958.)
LB	4	(Spain) José María Zárraga (c)
RH	5	(Spain) Juan Santisteban
LH	6	(Spain) Antonio Ruiz
OR	7	(France) Raymond Kopa
IR	8	(Spain) Enrique Mateos
CF	9	(Spain) Alfredo Di Stéfano (Note: Di Stéfano, a native Argentine, had represented both Argentina and Colombia earlier in his international career. He became a naturalised citizen of Spain in 1956, and began playing for the Spain national football team in 1957.)
IL	10	(Spain) Héctor Rial
OL	11	(Spain) Paco Gento
Manager:
(Argentina) Luis Carniglia

GK	1	(France) Dominique Colonna
RB	2	(France) Bruno Rodzik
CB	3	(France) Robert Jonquet (c)
LB	4	(France) Raoul Giraudo
RH	5	(France) Armand Penverne
LH	6	(France) Michel Leblond
OR	7	(France) Robert Lamartine
IR	8	(France) René Bliard
CF	9	(France) Just Fontaine
IL	10	(France) Roger Piantoni
OL	11	(France) Jean Vincent
Manager:
(France) Albert Batteux

== See also ==
- 1956 European Cup final – contested between same teams
- 1958–59 Real Madrid CF season
- Real Madrid CF in international football
