= René-Jean Jacquet =

French footballer (1933–1993)

René Jacquet
Personal information
- Full name: René-Jean Jacquet
- Date of birth: 27 June 1933
- Place of birth: Bordeaux, France
- Date of death: 21 July 1993 (aged 60)
- Place of death: Reims, France
- Position: Goalkeeper

Senior career*
Years	Team	Apps	(Gls)
1954–1955	Bordeaux	5	(0)
1955–1961	Reims	76	(0)
1961–1962	Lille	25	(0)
- * Club domestic league appearances and goals

René-Jean Jacquet (27 June 1933 – 21 July 1993) was a French football goalkeeper.

== Club career ==
- Girondins de Bordeaux (1954)
- Stade de Reims (1955–1961)
- Lille Olympique SC (1961–1962)
