= Raoul Giraudo =

French footballer (1932–1995)

Personal information
- Date of birth: 19 May 1932
- Place of birth: Aix-en-Provence, France
- Date of death: 26 October 1995 (aged 63)
- Place of death: Cerizay, France
- Position: Defender

Youth career
- Aix

Senior career*
Years	Team	Apps	(Gls)
1950–1960	Reims		
1960–1961	Grenoble		
1961–1962	Sochaux		
- * Club domestic league appearances and goals

Raoul Giraudo (19 May 1932 – 26 October 1995) was a French footballer who played as a defender. He is best known for playing for Reims, where he reached the European Cup finals in 1956 and 1959.
