= Henri Roessler =

French footballer and manager (1910-1978)

Personal information
- Date of birth: 16 September 1910
- Place of birth: Lauterbourg, Germany (now France)
- Date of death: 18 September 1978 (aged 68)
- Place of death: Plan-de-Cuques, France
- Height: 1.78 m (5 ft 10 in)
- Position: Defender

Senior career*
Years	Team	Apps	(Gls)
–1935	AS Strasbourg		
1935–1936	Troyes		
1936–1939	Strasbourg		
1940–1942	Red Star		
1942–1943	Troyes		
1943–1944	Reims-Champagne		
1944–1947	Reims		

International career
1942	France	2	(0)

Managerial career
- 1945–1950: Reims
- 1950–1954: Marseille
- 1954–1957: AS Aix
- * Club domestic league appearances and goals

Henri Roessler (16 September 1910 – 18 September 1978) was a French football player and manager.

He played as a defender for AS Strasbourg, AS Troyes-Savinienne, RC Strasbourg, Red Star, EF Reims-Champagne and Reims.

He coached Stade de Reims, Marseille and AS Aix.

== Honours ==
=== Player ===
Red Star

- Coupe de France: 1942

=== Manager ===
Reims

- Coupe de France: 1950
