= Stade de Reims =

French football club

Reims
- Full name: Stade de Reims
- Nicknames: Les rouges et blancs (The Red and Whites)
- Founded: 18 June 1931; 95 years ago
- Stadium: Stade Auguste-Delaune
- Capacity: 21,029
- Owner: Jean-Pierre Caillot
- President: Jean-Pierre Caillot
- Head coach: Nicolas Usaï
- League: Ligue 2
- 2025–26: Ligue 2, 6th of 18
- Website: stade-de-reims.com
Home colours	Away colours	Third colours

Stade de Reims (French pronunciation: [stad də ʁɛ̃s]) is a French professional football club based in Reims. The club was formed in 1931 and plays in Ligue 2, the second tier of football in France. Reims plays home matches at the Stade Auguste Delaune.

Reims is one of the most successful clubs in French football history having won six Ligue 1 titles, two Coupe de France trophies, and five Trophée des champions titles. The club has also performed well on European level having finished as runners-up in the 1956 and 1959 editions of the European Cup, and winning the Latin Cup and Coppa delle Alpi in 1953 and 1977, respectively. However, since the 1980s, Reims have struggled to get back to their zenith. The club hovered between Ligue 2 and the Championnat National for over thirty years after their relegation from the top flight in 1979. In 2012, they were promoted back to Ligue 1, were relegated again in 2016, but returned two years later.

Reims is viewed as a legendary club within French football circles, not only due to its domestic accolades, but its contribution towards the France national team through the 1940s and 1950s. They were largely responsible for the first Golden Generation of French football with Reims players Roger Marche, Raymond Kopa, Just Fontaine, Jean Vincent, Robert Jonquet, Armand Penverne, Dominique Colonna, and Roger Piantoni in the team that reached the semi-finals at the 1958 FIFA World Cup (third place).

== History ==
Stade de Reims was founded in 1910 under the name Société Sportive du Parc Pommery under the guidance of Marquis Melchior de Polignac, a Frenchman who later went on to serve on the International Olympic Committee. The club adopted its current name on 18 June 1931.

Despite the country adopting professional football in 1932, Reims remained an amateur club until 1935 after the club won the Championnat de France amateur under the leadership of Scotsman Billy Aitken. The club reached Division 1 for the first time in the 1945–46 season, the first championship following the conclusion of World War II. During the same year, the club promoted defender Robert Jonquet to the senior team and signed Roger Marche from Olympique de Charleville. Together, the two went on to become, arguably, the club's most famous players in its history.

Reims won its first Division 1 championship in 1949. Led by a talented backline of Marche, Jonquet, and Armand Penverne, as well as midfielders Albert Batteux and Michel Leblond, and an underrated striker trio of Pierre Flamion, Pierre Sinibaldi, and Pierre Bini, Reims won the league by a single point over Lille. The following season, the club won the Coupe de France defeating Racing Paris 2–1 in the final.

After the season, manager Henri Roessler departed the club and longtime player Batteux took the reins. The team's subsequent rise in the sport led to the signings of Raymond Kopa and Raoul Giraudo. In 1953, Reims won its second league title winning the league by four points. That same year, the club won the Latin Cup becoming the first French football club to attain the honour. The victory was cited as a coup for France after the country finished three straight years as runners-up in the competition. After the 1954 season, Marche left to play for the Racing team in Paris. In 1955, Reims won its third title in six seasons. The championship led to the club's qualification for the newly created European Cup.

In the inaugural edition of the European Cup, Reims reached the final where the team was defeated 4–3 by Spanish club Real Madrid. Reims controlled the match from the outset scoring two goals in the first ten minutes. However, two first half goals by Alfredo Di Stéfano and Héctor Rial for Madrid cancelled out Reims' early attacks. In the second half, Reims took the lead through Michel Hidalgo, but within minutes, the match was levelled courtesy of a goal from Marquitos. Real's winner in the 79th minute ended Reims' hopes of winning the first edition of the European Cup. In the following season, Reims lost prominent midfielder Kopa to Madrid, but still were able to recruit French internationals Just Fontaine, Jean Vincent, Roger Piantoni, and Dominique Colonna to the team. After early struggles, the additions paid off with the club winning its third title of the decade in the 1957–58 season. The team also won the Coupe de France after beating Nîmes Olympique 3–1 in the final, thus achieving the double.

In the 1958–59 edition of the European Cup, Reims returned to the final to face, for the second time, Real Madrid. Aside from Kopa switching sides and the arrival of Fontaine, Colonna, Piantoni, and Vincent to Reims, the line-ups were nearly identical to the previous meeting. However, an undeterred Madrid, who had already won the competition three times, cruised through to a victory with a convincing 2–0 win. After the season, Penverne departed the club. The team was, however, boosted by the return of Kopa who, subsequently led the team to its fifth league title in 11 seasons in 1960.

Following the season, Jonquet retired from international football and left Reims for Strasbourg. He was followed by Giraudo and Leblond. The departures failed to hinder Reims' performances domestically as the team won the league in 1962. The championship capped an amazing career for Just Fontaine, who, subsequently, retired from football. In the ensuing season, which was longtime manager Albert Batteux's last, Reims finished runner-up to AS Monaco in the league and, the following season, shocked many by finishing 17th, which resulted in the club falling to the second division. The relegation led to the departures or retirements of many of the players who were a part of Reims' dynastic run in the 1950s; all except for Kopa who remained with Reims until 1967.

Reims returned to top-flight for the 1966–67 season after two seasons in the second division. However, the stint proved short with Reims finishing 19th. In 1970, the club returned to top-flight and remained in the league for nearly a decade. Reims' best performance in the league during its nine-year stint was finishing 5th in the 1975–76 season. Reims were relegated in 1979 and didn't return to the first division of French football for 33 years. In the ensuing season in Division 2, Reims was limited financially and was forced to field a much younger team during the campaign.

Despite the return of former popular player Carlos Bianchi as manager during the mid-1980s, the club failed to return to Division 1. Reims did surprise many by reaching the semi-finals of the Coupe de France in back-to-back seasons in 1987 and 1988. As the years wore on, the club's financial situation began to take a turn for the worse and, in 1991, Reims was administratively relegated to Division 3 after its failure to find a buyer to help alleviate the club's debt, which had exceeded over ₣50 million. In October 1991, the club underwent liquidation and changed its name to Stade de Reims Champagne FC. The club spent the 1991–92 season in Division 3 and were, surprisingly, declared ineligible to compete in the league ahead of its final league match in May 1992 after a judicial liquidation resulted in the stoppage of the club's activities. In the ensuing months, all aspects of the club (its records, trophies, etc.) were auctioned off. (Upon the club's re-introduction in 1992, a new French law restricting alcohol advertising banned their old logo, which included a bottle of wine on top of a football; the club had no formal logo until 1999, when the old club name was restored.)

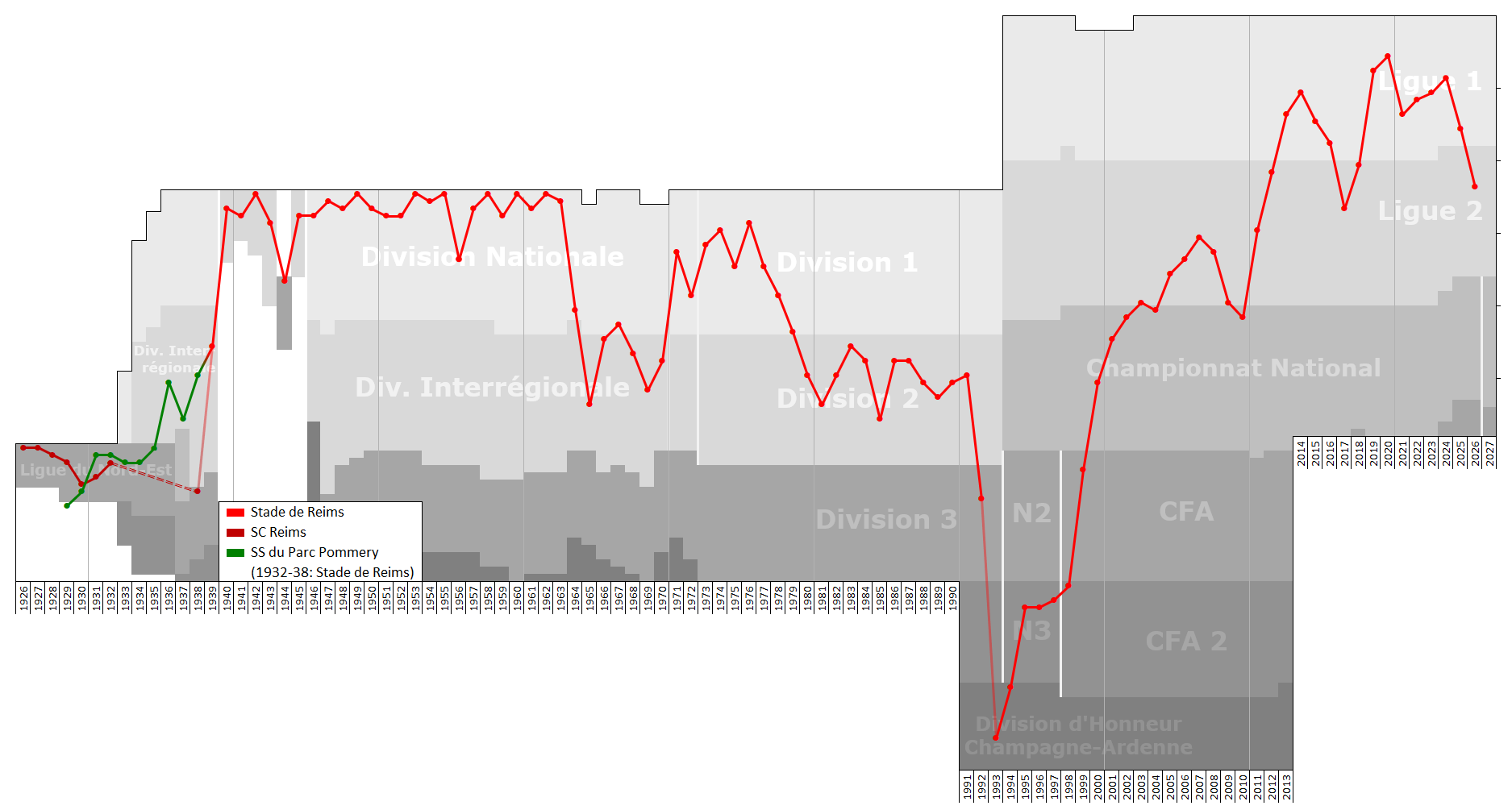
Historical league performance chart of Stade de Reims

Reims was reborn in July 1992 under the name Stade de Reims Champagne. The club began play in the Division d'Honneur and spent two seasons in the league before earning promotion to the Championnat National. Reims spent the final years of the century playing in National and the Championnat de France amateur. In November 1996, most of the club's items that were sold in the 1992 auction were re-acquired under the assistance of the Alain Afflelou retail chain. In July 1999, the club changed its name back to Stade de Reims and, after three years, were rewarded with professional status after earning promotion back to Ligue 2.

The logo from 1999 until 2020.

The club's return to Ligue 2 in 2002 was brief. Reims finished bottom of the league. In the next season playing in National, Reims won the league returning to Ligue 2. The club spent the next five seasons playing in the second division failing to finish in the top half of the table in every campaign. In the 2008–09 season, Reims were relegated from Ligue 2 and, like its previous relegation, responded by returning to the league after one season in National after finishing 2nd. Reims finished Ligue 2 as 10th in 2010–11 season. In the 2011–12 season, Reims finally finished the league as runner-up and returned to Ligue 1 after 33 years.

On 14 May 2016, Reims were relegated to Ligue 2 after a four year stay in the top flight. On 16 August 2016, Real Madrid played a friendly against Reims to commemorate the 60th anniversary of the 1956 European Cup final which both teams were involved in. Real Madrid won 5–3. On 21 April 2018, Reims were promoted back to Ligue 1 after a two year absence finishing first and claiming the Ligue 2 title.

In the 2018–19 season, Reims finished in 8th place, defeating champions Paris Saint-Germain 3–1 in the final game of the year. In the 2019–20 season, Reims were ranked in the 6th place, to qualify to the 2020–21 UEFA Europa League, and to play their first match in European competitions since 13 March 1963 against Feyenoord, which ended 1–1 in the 1962–63 European Cup.

In the 2024–25 season, Reims reached the Coupe de France final against Paris Saint-Germain but lost 3–0. Meanwhile, they lost their last three Ligue 1 matches, dropping to 16th place, while a stoppage-time winner for Le Havre allowed them to surpass Reims in the standings on the final matchday. Reims then faced FC Metz in the relegation play-off and were defeated 3–1 at home after extra time, resulting in their brief relegation, until Lyon were administratively relegated due to financial reasons, leading to Reims surviving. However, after an appeal Lyon were relieved from relegation and Reims were relegated again.

== Honours ==
Stade de Reims honours
Type	Competition	Titles	Seasons/Years
Domestic	Ligue 1	6	1948–49, 1952–53, 1954–55, 1957–58, 1959–60, 1961–62
Domestic	Ligue 2	2	1965–66, 2017–18
Domestic	Championnat National	1	2003–04
Domestic	CFA 2	2	1998, 2015–16
Domestic	Division d'Honneur Nord-Est	1	1994
Domestic	Championnat de France Amateur	1	1935
Domestic	Coupe de France	2	1949–50, 1957–58
Domestic	Coupe de la Ligue	1	1990–91
Domestic	Trophée des Champions	4	1955, 1958, 1960, 1966
International	Latin Cup	1	1953

== European record ==
Season	Competition	Round	Club	Home	Away	Aggregate
1955–56	European Cup	1R	(Denmark) AGF Aarhus	2–2	2–0	4–2
1955–56	European Cup	QF	(Hungary) Vörös Lobogó	4–2	4–4	8–6
1955–56	European Cup	SF	(Scotland) Hibernian	2–0	1–0	3–0
1955–56	European Cup	Final	(Spain) Real Madrid	3–4		
1958–59	European Cup	PR	(Northern Ireland) Ards	6–2	4–1	10–3
1958–59	European Cup	1R	(Finland) HPS	4–0	3–0	7–0
1958–59	European Cup	QF	(Belgium) Standard Liège	3–0	0–2	3–2
1958–59	European Cup	SF	(Switzerland) Young Boys	3–0	0–1	3–1
1958–59	European Cup	Final	(Spain) Real Madrid	0–2		
1960–61	European Cup	PR	(Luxembourg) Jeunesse Esch	6–1	5–0	11–1
1960–61	European Cup	1R	(England) Burnley	3–2	0–2	3–4
1962–63	European Cup	1R	Austria Wien	5–0	2–3	7–3
1962–63	European Cup	QF	(Netherlands) Feyenoord	0–1	1–1	1–2
2020–21	UEFA Europa League	2QR	(Switzerland) Servette	—N/a	1–0	—N/a
2020–21	UEFA Europa League	3QR	(Hungary) Fehérvár	—N/a	0–0 (1–4 p)	—N/a

== Players ==
=== Current squad ===
As of 8 September 2026.

Note: Flags indicate national team as defined under FIFA eligibility rules; some limited exceptions apply. Players may hold more than one non-FIFA nationality.

No.	Pos.	Nation	Player
1	GK	GER	Tom Ritzy Hülsmann
2	DF	KEN	Joseph Okumu
5	MF	NGR	John Otomewo
6	MF	BEL	Théo Leoni (captain)
7	FW	FRA	Tidiane Diarrassouba
8	MF	CIV	Yaya Fofana
9	FW	DEN	Mohamed Daramy
10	FW	MAR	Youssef El Kachati
11	FW	FRA	Amine Salama
12	GK	SUI	Edin Omeragić
16	GK	FRA	Alexis Sauvage
18	DF	ESP	Sergio Akieme
21	DF	ITA	Jean-Tryfose Mambuku
22	DF	CMR	Samuel Kotto

No.	Pos.	Nation	Player
24	MF	CIV	Mory Gbane
25	MF	FRA	Lenny Sylla
26	DF	BEL	Maël Debondt
27	DF	MLI	Daouda Guindo
28	DF	CIV	Elie N'Tamon
30	MF	IRL	John Patrick
48	FW	FRA	Arone Gadou
63	DF	CIV	Armel Zohouri
73	FW	IRL	Ike Orazi
85	FW	NGR	Hafiz Umar Ibrahim
87	MF	MLI	Ange Martial Tia
94	GK	GUI	Soumaïla Sylla
99	FW	SEN	Sambou Soumano
—	DF	CAN	Aleksandr Guboglo (on loan from CF Montréal)

=== Out on loan ===
Note: Flags indicate national team as defined under FIFA eligibility rules; some limited exceptions apply. Players may hold more than one non-FIFA nationality.

No.	Pos.	Nation	Player
—	DF	SWE	Malcolm Jeng (at Groningen until 30 June 2027)
—	DF	JPN	Hiroki Sekine (at Holstein Kiel until 30 June 2027)
—	FW	GAM	Adama Bojang (at Charleroi until 30 June 2027)

No.	Pos.	Nation	Player
—	FW	CIV	Oumar Diakité (at Sturm Graz until 30 June 2027)
—	FW	MLI	Niama Pape Sissoko (at Ried until 30 June 2027)

=== Reserve team ===
As of 22 June 2025

Note: Flags indicate national team as defined under FIFA eligibility rules; some limited exceptions apply. Players may hold more than one non-FIFA nationality.

No.	Pos.	Nation	Player
47	DF	FRA	Melvin Borne
56	DF	FRA	Killian Prouchet
59	FW	MLI	Abdoulaye Gory
65	FW	FRA	Sophian Do Carmo
70	GK	FRA	Léo Ripert
75	FW	FRA	Mathéo Titalom Penka
76	MF	FRA	Lenny Sylla

No.	Pos.	Nation	Player
77	FW	FRA	Anddrys Solvet
78	FW	FRA	Adama Baradji
79	DF	FRA	Ansoumana Dansokho
80	GK	FRA	Matisse Morville
81	DF	FRA	Justin Tsouh
82	DF	FRA	Sacha Burek
83	DF	NGR	Amos Ochoche

=== Notable players ===
Below are the notable former players who have represented Stade de Reims in league and international competition since the club's foundation in 1910. To appear in the section below, a player must have played in at least 100 official matches for the club.

Morocco

1. (Morocco) Yunis Abdelhamid

Algeria

1. (Algeria) Aissa Mandi

France

1. (France) Albert Batteux
2. (France) Armand Penverne
3. (France) Bruno Rodzik
4. (France) Cédric Fauré
5. (France) Dominique Colonna
6. (France) Jacques Favre
7. (France) Jean Templin
8. (France) Jean Vincent
9. (France) Just Fontaine
10. (France) Léon Glovacki
11. (France) Lucien Muller
12. (France) Marcel Aubour
13. (France) Michel Leblond
14. (France) Pierre Flamion
15. (France) Pierre Sinibaldi
16. (France) Raoul Giraudo
17. (France) Raymond Kopa
18. (France) René Bliard
19. (France) René-Jean Jacquet
20. (France) Robert Jonquet
21. (France) Robert Siatka
22. (France) Roger Marche
23. (France) Roger Piantoni
24. (France) Simon Zimny

Zimbabwe

1. (Zimbabwe) Marshall Munetsi

== Club officials ==
Management

- President: Jean-Pierre Caillot
- Association president: Didier Perrin

Coaching staff

- Head coach: Nicolas Usaï
- Assistant coach: Tim Smolders, Alberto Escobar, Franck Chalençon, Samba Diawara
- Goalkeeper coach: Thomas Trochut
- Match analyst: Adrien Mahy
- Performance manager: Nicolas Bouriette
- Sporting director: Pol-Édouard Caillot
- Physiotherapist: Romain Marteau, Yohann Bionne, Julien Vaur

== Coaching history ==
Dates	Name
1931–34	(England) David Harrison
1934–36	(Scotland) Billy Aitken
1936–37	(Switzerland) Leopold Kielholz
1937	(France) Sarkis Garabedian
1937–38	(Romania) ( (France) ?) Valère de Besveconny
1938–40	(Austria) Erich Bieber
1940–41	(France) Camille Cottin
1941–43	(France) Jules Vandooren
1943–45	(France) Sarkis Garabedian
1945–50	(France) Henri Roessler
1950–63	(France) Albert Batteux
1963	(France) Camille Cottin
1963–64	(France) Jean Prouff
1964–67	(France) Robert Jonquet
1967	(France) Claude Prosdocimi
1967–69	(France) Émile Rummelhardt
1969–72	(France) Élie Fruchard
1972	(France) Léon Desmenez
1972	(France) Célestin Oliver
1972–74	(France) Lucien Leduc

Dates	Name
1974–75	(France) Léon Desmenez
1975	(France) Michel Leblond
1975–79	(France) Pierre Flamion
1979	(France) Claude Prosdocimi
1979–80	(France) René Vernier
1980–81	(France) Robert Jonquet (France) Léon Desmenez
1981–82	(France) Léon Desmenez
1982–85	(France) Pierre Phelipon
1985–88	(Argentina) Carlos Bianchi
1988–89	(France) Dominique Bathenay
1989–90	(France) Jacky Lemée
1990–91	(France) Didier Notheaux
1991–92	(France) Pierre Phelipon
1992–93	(France) Daniel Duval
1993	(France) Ghislain Bournel
1993–95	(France) Tony Giannetta
1995–00	(France) Manuel Abreu
2000 (interim)	(France) Franck Triquenaux
2000–02	(France) Marc Collat

Dates	Name
2002–03	(France) Denis Goavec
2003–05	(France) Ladislas Lozano
2005 (interim)	(France) Jean-Claude Cloët
2005–07	(France) Thierry Froger
2008	(France) Didier Tholot
2008–09	(France) Luis Fernández
2009–10	(France) Marc Collat
2010–14	(France) Hubert Fournier
2014–15	(France) Jean-Luc Vasseur
2015–16	(France) Olivier Guégan
2016 (interim)	(France) David Guion
2016–17	(Armenia) Michel Der Zakarian
2017–21	(France) David Guion
2021–22	(Spain) Óscar García
2022–24	(England) Will Still
2024 (caretaker)	(Mali) Samba Diawara
2024–2025	(Slovenia) Luka Elsner
2025 (interim)	(Mali) Samba Diawara
2025–	(Belgium) Karel Geraerts
