= René Bliard =

French footballer (1932–2009)

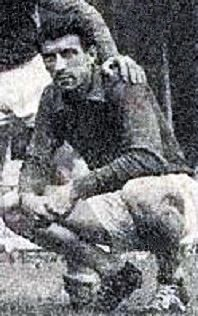
- Bliard ca 1950

Personal information
- Date of birth: 18 October 1932
- Place of birth: Dizy, Marne, France
- Date of death: 27 September 2009 (aged 76)
- Position: Striker

Senior career*
Years	Team	Apps	(Gls)
1953–1959	Reims		
1959–1960	Red Star		
1960–1961	Rouen		
1961–1963	Red Star		

International career
1955–1958	France	7	(0)
- * Club domestic league appearances and goals

René Bliard (18 October 1932 – 27 September 2009) was a French professional footballer who played as a striker for Stade de Reims in the 1950s. He was also part of France's squad for the 1952 Summer Olympics, but he did not play in any matches.

== Honours ==
- Division 1: 1955, 1958
- Coupe de France: 1958
- European Cup runner-up: 1956, 1959
