= Jean Templin =

French footballer (1928-1980)

Personal information
- Full name: Janusz Templin
- Date of birth: 14 December 1928
- Place of birth: France
- Date of death: 23 November 1980 (aged 51)
- Place of death: France
- Position: Striker

Youth career
- FC Villefranche

Senior career*
Years	Team	Apps	(Gls)
?–1950	FC Villefranche		
1950–1956	Reims		
1956–1957	Lens		
1957–1960	FC Nancy		
- * Club domestic league appearances and goals

Janusz Templin (14 December 1928 – 23 November 1980), most commonly known as Jean Templin, was a French former football striker.
