= Léon Glovacki =

French footballer (1928-2009)

Personal information
- Date of birth: 19 February 1928
- Place of birth: Libercourt, France
- Date of death: 9 September 2009 (aged 81)
- Place of death: Geneva, Switzerland
- Position: Striker

Senior career*
Years	Team	Apps	(Gls)
1947–1949	Douai		
1949–1952	Troyes	63	(31)
1952–1957	Reims	159	(65)
1957–1959	Monaco	55	(14)
1959–1960	Saint-Étienne	20	(4)
1960–1962	Reims	33	(11)

International career
1953–1955	France	11	(3)

Managerial career
- 1962–1966: Dijon
- 1966–1968: Olympique Avignonnais
- 1968–1969: FC Annecy
- * Club domestic league appearances and goals

Léon Glovacki (19 February 1928 – 9 September 2009) was a French football striker.

== Personal life ==
Glovacki was born in France, and was of Polish descent. He was an international for the France national football team.
