= Dominique Colonna =

French footballer (1928–2023)

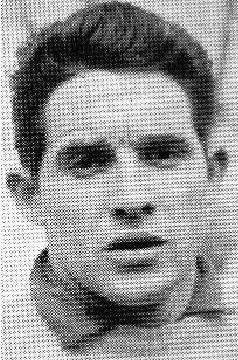
- Colonna in 1955

Personal information
- Date of birth: 4 September 1928
- Place of birth: Corte, France
- Date of death: 12 September 2023 (aged 95)
- Place of death: Corte, France
- Height: 1.72 m (5 ft 8 in)
- Position: Goalkeeper

Youth career
- USC Corte

Senior career*
Years	Team	Apps	(Gls)
1948–1949	Montpellier	12	(0)
1949–1955	Stade Français	101	(0)
1955–1957	Nice	55	(0)
1957–1963	Reims	172	(0)
Total		340	(0)

International career
1957–1961	France	13	(0)

Managerial career
- 1965–1970: Cameroon
Medal record
Representing France
FIFA World Cup
Third place	1958 Sweden
- * Club domestic league appearances and goals

Dominique Colonna (4 September 1928 – 12 September 2023) was a French footballer who played as a goalkeeper.

Colonna died in Corte on 12 September 2023, at the age of 95.

== Honours ==
Nice

- French championship: 1956

Reims

- French championship: 1958, 1960, 1962
- Coupe de France: 1958
- Trophée des champions: 1958
- European Cup: runner-up 1959
