= Michel Leblond =

French footballer (1932-2009)

Personal information
- Full name: Michel Leblond
- Date of birth: 10 May 1932
- Place of birth: Reims, France
- Date of death: 17 December 2009 (aged 77)
- Place of death: Reims, France
- Position: Midfielder

Senior career*
Years	Team	Apps	(Gls)
1949–1961	Reims	271	(30)
1961–1964	Strasbourg	99	(3)
Total		370	(33)

International career
1954–1957	France	4	(1)

Managerial career
- 1975: Reims
- * Club domestic league appearances and goals

Michel Leblond (10 May 1932 – 17 December 2009) was a French football midfielder who was a member of the French squad at FIFA World Cup 1954 and a main player of great Stade de Reims in the 1950s. He also holds the honour of being the first person to score in a European Champions' Cup Final. He also played for France at the 1952 Summer Olympics.

== Honours ==
- Division 1: 1953, 1955, 1958, 1960
- Coupe de France: 1958
- European Cup: Runner-up 1956, 1960
