= Michel Hidalgo =

French footballer and manager (1933–2020)

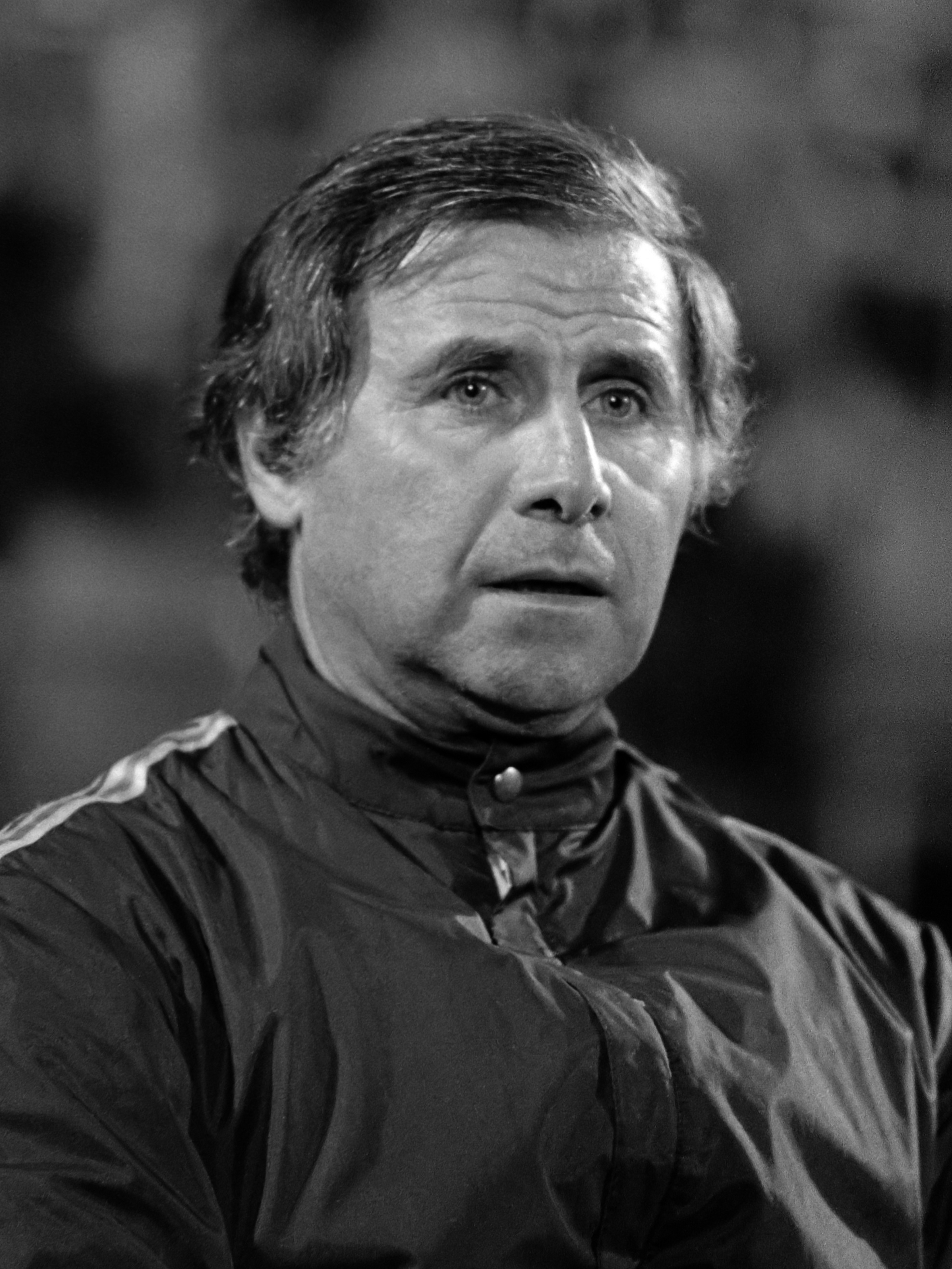
- France head coach, Michel Hidalgo, on March 25, 1981, at the Rotterdam stadium.

Personal information
- Full name: Michel François Hidalgo
- Date of birth: 22 March 1933
- Place of birth: Leffrinckoucke, Nord, France
- Date of death: 26 March 2020 (aged 87)
- Place of death: Marseille, Bouches-du-Rhône, France
- Height: 1.68 m (5 ft 6 in)
- Position: Midfielder

Youth career
- US Normande

Senior career*
Years	Team	Apps	(Gls)
1952–1954	Le Havre	47	(13)
1954–1957	Reims	66	(23)
1957–1966	Monaco	256	(26)
Total		369	(62)

International career
1962	France	1	(0)

Managerial career
- 1976–1984: France
Medal record
Men's football
Representing France (as manager)
UEFA European Championship
Winner	1984
- * Club domestic league appearances and goals

Michel François Hidalgo (French pronunciation: [miʃɛl fʁɑ̃swa idalɡo]; 22 March 1933 – 26 March 2020) was a French professional footballer and manager. He was the head coach of the France national team from March 27, 1976 to June 27, 1984, with whom he won the UEFA Euro 1984 on home soil, also reaching the semi-finals of the 1982 FIFA World Cup.

== Early life ==
Michel François Hidalgo was born on 22 March 1933 in Leffrinckoucke, Nord. Michel and his twin brother Serge were born to a Spanish-born metal worker employed at the metallurgical company of Normandy ("société métallurgique de Normandie") and a Parisian mother. They lived in north-western France, and after 1935 grew up at Mondeville-Colombelle, Calvados, in Normandy. In 1940 the Hidalgo family was evacuated as many working families in metallurgy, in order to flee the Wehrmacht advance. His family returned to settle in 1946 in the devastated vicinity of Caen near the same metallurgical factory, where the father still worked and the twins started playing football in a patronage club created, from odds and ends, by the Catholic priest, Father Martin, a football lover.. The promising junior player was recruited by "Union Sportive Normande", amateur workers' club, associated with the metallurgical factory where his father works.

== Club career ==
Center forward, wing forward, or sometimes, to preserve a result, libero before being midfielder, Hidalgo was champion of Normandie Juniors in 1952 with US Normande, before signing up to Le Havre's books for two seasons, later playing for Reims, with whom he played and scored a goal in the 4–3 defeat to Real Madrid in the 1956 European Cup Final, also winning a league title in 1955.

Under the wing of Rocher, who signed him for Monaco, Hidalgo won two league titles and two national cup titles with Monaco. After the resignation of the founding president, his friend Just Fontaine, in 1965, he presided over the UNFP, a players' union and fights to impose a fair union definition of the 'contract on time' until June 1969. Called to the French Federation of Foot-ball, he must leave this union function to Philippe Piat in 1970.

== International career ==
At international level, Hidalgo was capped once for the France national team, playing a friendly match in Florence against Italy on the 5th May 1962.

Later, Michel Hidalgo praised the game of great international players with strong personalities as Di Stefano, Pelé, Eusébio, Puskas, Kopa, Cruiff, Gerd Müller, Beckenbauer etc.

== Managerial career ==
Hidalgo started managing the Monaco second or amateur team from 1967 as a player coach and even served, under specific loan contract, as a player-manager with Menton during the season 1968–1969. In 1970 he is called to the national technical direction (DTN, part of the French "Fédération" of Football) led by Georges Boulogne, as responsible for the southwest region. In 1972, during a Brazilian tour, he was promoted to assistant of Georges Boulogne with the French team. He remained in office under the authority of Stefan Kovacs from 1973 to December 1975. On the first of January 1976 he became director of national selections.

On 27 March 1976, he was appointed France national team head coach, replacing Ștefan Kovács – under whom he had previously served as a respectfull assistant – during a time when France was having difficulty in major tournaments. Included in his side was playmaker and captain Michel Platini, who helped the side turn a new page in their book and get back to winning ways. After suffering a first-round elimination at the 1978 FIFA World Cup, in the 1982 FIFA World Cup Hidalgo led the team to the semi-finals, where he lost to the West German side on penalties following a 3–3 draw after extra-time; France eventually finished the tournament in fourth place. In 1984, he won the European Championship on home soil, beating Spain 2–0 in the final in Paris; this was France's first major international title. The exciting attacking style of football that he implemented with the France national side during this period was known as "champagne football" in the media. Hidalgo is also regarded as the architect of the French "carré magique" (magic square), which was nickname given to the creative and talented four-man midfield of the France national side during the 80s, which was made up of Michel Platini, Alain Giresse, Jean Tigana, and Luis Fernandez.

After his victory, he passed the reins over to his assistant Henri Michel and got a job as the National Technical Director, where he remained until 1986, afterwards choosing a managerial position at Marseille. He is considered an idol among the Marseille supporters. He strayed from the limelight after 1991, taking a sidelining role as a football pundit on Demain, c'est foot, a football show on TMC Monte Carlo.

== Death ==
Hidalgo died on 26 March 2020 in Marseille, Bouches-du-Rhône, at the age of 87, after a lengthy struggle with a disease.

== Quotes ==
On his twin brother Serge, first partner and opponent too in soccer

- I learned to dribble, one-on-one with Serge, head to head, facing each other etc., that is to say with myself.

On the art of passing the ball (Equality and Fraternity in soccer and other collective balls sports)

- "A good pass, well clean, a perfectly measured ball movement, just as it should be in the anticipation of his playing partner’s race, is like offering a vibrant handshake to his friend".

On freedom

- "Soccer ball as sport taught me freedom. And that is why there can be no other soccer ball in my eyes than soccer ball in freedom".

== Honours ==
=== Player ===
Havre Athletic Club

- Division 1: 1952–54
  - Division 1: 1952–53
  - Division 1: 1953–54

Stade de Reims

- Division 1: 1954–55 : Team "Champion de France" in 1955
  - Trophée des Champions: 1955
- Division 1: 1955–56
  - European Cup runner-up: 1955–56
- Division 1: 1956–57

Association Sportive de Monaco

- Division 1 : 1957–1967
  - Division 1: 1957–58
  - Division 1: 1958–59
  - Division 1: 1959–60
  - Coupe de France: 1959–60
  - Division 1: 1960–61 Team "Champion de France" in 1961
  - Trophée des Champions: 1961
  - Division 1: 1961–62
  - Division 1: 1962–63 Team "Champion de France" in 1963
  - Coupe de France 1962–63
  - Division 1: 1963–64
  - European Cup runner: 1963–64
  - Division 1: 1964–65
  - Division 1: 1965–66
  - Division 1: 1966–67

=== Manager ===
France

- UEFA European Championship: 1984

Individual

- French Manager of the Year: 1982 (for coaching the French team A)
- World Soccer World Manager of the Year: 1984
- Guerin Sportivo Manager of the Year: 1984

== Bibliography ==
- Michel Hidalgo (with Jean-Philippe Rethacker), Football en liberté, Collection "Les témoins du Sport", Editions Ramsay, Paris, 1978, 252 pages. (ISBN 978-2-85956-057-7). Third part "Quarante-cinq ans d'équipe de France" p. 193-250, appears as a listing of matchs of the French team (called Les Bleus) from 1933 to the season 1977–78, including main dates of the career of Michel Hidalgo.
- Michel Hidalgo (with Jean-Philippe Rethacker), Football en Bleus, Éditions Ramsay, Paris, avril 1982, 174 p. with table of contents. (ISBN 978-2-85956-259-5). Notebook out of text offering photographs with short captions, insertion of 32 pages between page 88 and 89, with the first nine pages about his family life or as a footballer or coach, and the following twenty-three pages showing the pose before-match of the major French soccer teams since 1944.
- Guy Kedia and Roger Driès, with Just Fontaine, 1930-1982 : La France et ses 12 coupes du mondes, de Montevideo à Madrid, RTL Edition, 1982, 224 p. Two-page preface written by Pelé. (ISBN 978-2-86494-034-0)
- Michel Hidalgo et Patrice Burchkalter, Le temps des Bleus. Mémoires, Jacob-Duvernet, Paris, 2007, 211 p. (ISBN 2-84724-146-4)
