= 1950–51 USM Blida season =

USM Blida
1950–51 season
- President: Dr Bachir Abdelouahab
- Head coach: Mohamed Khelifa
- Stadium: FCB Stadium
- Division Honneur: 8th
- Forconi Cup: Fifth round
- Top goalscorer: League: Sid Ali Mahieddine (6); All: Sid Ali Mahieddine (7)
Home colours

USM Blida's 1951–52 season was the club's 18th season since its founding in 1932. The team competed in the Division Honneur, finishing 8th, and the Forconi Cup.

== Pre-season and friendlies ==
| 3 September 1950 | AS Boufarik | 3–3 | USM Blida | Boufarik |
| 9:15 | | | | Stadium: Stade des Quinconces |

| 24 December 1950 | US Constantine | 2–0 | USM Blida | Constantine |
| | Rimlinger, Jordi, Ortega, Schembri (Berenguer), Salléa, Ladola, Campous, Léonelli, Cortiecchiato, Trévisani, Bouchouk | Report | Zouaoui, Zouakou, Zouraghi, Yantren, Ferhat, Bekhoucha, Mazouz, Khelifa, Mahieddine, Brakni, Lekehal |
Note: Friendly

| 25 December 1950 | MO Constantine | 1–2 | USM Blida | Constantine |
| | Missoum 55' | Report | Yantren; Lekehal | Referee: Benelouazzene |
Note: Friendly

| 6 June 1951 Friendly | USM Blida | 1–8 | (France) Stade Reims | Blida |
| 21:00 (Ramadan) | Dahmane Meftah Menacer, Bekhoucha Raouti, Mansouri, Bouguerra, Bernou, Zouraghi, Mahieddine, Chalane, Bensamed, Benelfoul, Meftah | (0–2); Report; Report | Francis Méano; André Petitfils; Jean Templin Sinibaldi; Jacowski, Jonquet, Marche, Zimny; Delcampe, Penverne; Villanova, Appel, Petitfils, Méano | Stadium: USB; Attendance: 5.000 |

== Competitions ==
=== Overview ===
| Competition | Record | | | | | | | | Started round | Final position / round | First match | Last match |
| Competition | G | W | D | L | GF | GA | GD | Win % | Started round | Final position / round | First match | Last match |
|---|---|---|---|---|---|---|---|---|---|---|---|---|
| Division Honneur | 22 | 5 | 9 | 8 | 24 | 31 | −7 | 22.73 | — | 9th | 17 September 1951 | 29 April 1952 |
| Forconi Cup | 2 | 1 | 0 | 1 | 4 | 4 | +0 | 50.00 | Fourth Round | Fifth Round | 5 November 1951 | 3 December 1951 |
| Total | 24 | 6 | 9 | 9 | 28 | 35 | −7 | 25.00 | | | | |

== Division Honneur ==
=== League table ===
| Pos | Team | Pld | W | D | L | GF | GA | GD | Pts | Qualification or relegation |
|---|---|---|---|---|---|---|---|---|---|---|
| 1 | GS Alger (C) | 22 | 11 | 9 | 2 | 39 | 20 | +19 | 53 | Qualified for North African Championship |
| 2 | Olympique d'Hussein Dey | 22 | 13 | 5 | 4 | 46 | 18 | +28 | 53 | |
| 3 | AS Boufarik | 22 | 9 | 11 | 2 | 36 | 31 | +5 | 51 | |
| 4 | MC Alger | 22 | 10 | 7 | 5 | 35 | 24 | +11 | 49 | |
| 5 | FC Blidéen | 22 | 11 | 4 | 7 | 41 | 31 | +10 | 48 | |
| 6 | Stade Guyotville | 22 | 7 | 9 | 6 | 40 | 31 | +9 | 45 | |
| 7 | RS Alger | 22 | 7 | 7 | 8 | 32 | 29 | +3 | 43 | |
| 8 | RU Alger | 22 | 4 | 11 | 7 | 21 | 32 | −11 | 41 | |
| 9 | USM Blida | 22 | 5 | 9 | 8 | 24 | 31 | −7 | 41 | |
| 10 | AS Saint Eugène | 22 | 3 | 10 | 9 | 25 | 33 | −8 | 38 | |
| 11 | Olympique de Marengo | 22 | 3 | 8 | 11 | 26 | 49 | −23 | 36 | Relegated to 1951–52 First Division |
| 12 | US Ouest-Mitidja | 22 | 2 | 5 | 15 | 15 | 42 | −27 | 31 | Relegated to 1951–52 First Division |

(C) Champions

=== Matches ===
Win Draw Loss

| 17 September 1950 Round 1 | USM Blida | 2–2 | RS Alger | Blida |
| | Chalane 5'; Zouakou 26' Zouaoui, Bouguerra, Bekhoucha Raouti, Reguieg, Madoudou, Ben Hamouda, Zouraghi, Zouakou, Chalane, Lekhal, Mazouz | (2–1); Report | Buffard 4'; Maouch 85' Bouquet, Vermeuil, Caillat, Magliozzi, Achour, Sadi, Maouch, Zerapha, Buffard, Zaibek, Ponsetti | Stadium: FCB Stadium; Referee: Delpech |

| 24 September 1950 Round 2 | MC Alger | 0–2 | USM Blida | Saint-Eugène |
| | Abtouche, Hamoutène, Kouar, Oualiken, Abdellaoui, Benhamou Hamid, Deguigui, Bennour, Bouaichoum, Khabatou, Hahad | (0–2); Report | Lekhal 11'; Mahieddine 16' Zouaoui, Bekhoucha Raouti, Zouakou, Bouguerra; Madoudou, Zouraghi; Brakni, Chalane, Mazouz, Mahieddine, Lekhal | Stadium: Saint-Eugène; Referee: Lapasset |

| 1 October 1950 Round 3 | USM Blida | 0–2 | O Hussein Dey | Blida |
| | Zouaoui, Reguieg, Bekhoucha Raouti, Bouguerra; Zouraghi, Madoudou; Zouakou, Hadji, Mahieddine, Chalane, Lekhal | Report | Belamine 73', 74' Ehrard, Montovani, Santiago, Mascaro, Fiol, Mokrane, Gomez, Fez, Belamine, Ouzifi, Perret | Stadium: FCB Stadium; Attendance: 2.500; Referee: M. Moussaoui |

| 8 October 1950 Round 4 | Stade Guyotville | 1–1 | USM Blida | Guyotville |
| | Cambresy 22' Zaidi, Valence, Balester V, Cioffi, De Pasquale, Gélabert, Cambresy, Llorens, Vitiello, Balester P, Giorgetti | Report | Mahieddine, Mazouz? 4' Zouaoui, Reguieg (injured), Bouguerra, Mansouri, Bekhoucha Raouti, Chalane, Mazouz, Brakni, Hadji, Mahieddine, Lekhal | Referee: M. Revieccio |

| 15 October 1950 Round 5 | USM Blida | 2–2 | AS Boufarik | Blida |
| | Mahieddine 50', 55' Zouaoui, Reguieg, Bouguerra, Mansouri, Bekhoucha Raouti, Hadji, Lekhal, Chalane, Mahieddine, Brakni, Mazouz | Report | Navarro 26', 42' Gervais, Vicédo, Massip I, Massip II, Navarro, Richert, Defrance, Gotvallès, Vomero, Roman, Olcina | Stadium: FCB Stadium; Attendance: 2.000; Referee: Chiraux |

| 22 October 1950 Round 6 | FC Blida | 0–2 | USM Blida | Blida |
| | Rosens, Pellegrini, Gasc, Pons, Riéra, Arnau, Guarinos, Daidi Mohamed, Meftah Dahmane, Ruiz, Gamouda Ahmed | Report | Mahieddine 40'; Hadji 77' Zouaoui, Bekhoucha Raouti, Mansouri, Bouguerra, Madoudou, Chalane, Brakni, Ferhat (1st match), Mahieddine, Mazouz, Hadji | Stadium: FCB Stadium; Attendance: 3.000; Referee: Belkessa Abdelkader |

| 29 October 1950 Round 7 | USM Blida | 0–0 | GS Alger | Blida |
| | Zouaoui, Bekhoucha Raouti, Mansouri, Bouguerra, Madoudou, Chalane, Mazouz, Ferhat, Mahieddine, Hadji, Brakni | Report; Report | Testa, Principato, Belmonte, Ferasse, Torrès, Calmus, Biton, Fortuné, Giono, Bagur, Deléo | Stadium: FCB Stadium; Attendance: 2.400; Referee: Delpeuch |

| 12 November 1950 Round 8 | AS Saint Eugène | 3–1 | USM Blida | Saint-Eugène |
| | Ducasse 43'; Rivas 53'; De Villeneuve 56' Schneider, Stepanof, Beringuer, Aboulker, Oliver, Berrah, Rivas, Salem, Collonges, De Villeneuve, Ducasse | Report | Mahieddine 20' Zouaoui, Zouakou, Mansouri, Zerrouki - Bekhoucha Raouti, Zouraghi - Mazouz, Ferhat, Mahieddine, Brakni, Hadji | Stadium: Saint-Eugène; Attendance: 4.500; Referee: Derradji |

| 19 November 1950 Round 9 | USM Blida | 2–1 | US Ouest Mitidja | Blida |
| | Zouraghi 15'; Ahmed Yantrèn 39' (pen.) Zouaoui, Bekhoucha Raouti, Mansouri, Madoudou, Yantrèn, Zouraghi, Fellous, Ferhat, Mahieddine, Brakni, Lekhal | Report | Si Omar 34' Levèque, Rouquier, Soum Benyoucef, Reboub, Andriada, Gaillard, Si Amar, Ratto, Cervera, Saidoun, Bensamet | Stadium: FCB Stadium; Attendance: 1.600; Referee: Giner |

| 26 November 1950 Round 10 | O Marengo | 1–1 | USM Blida | Marengo |
| | Bessone 89' Duhin, Munoz, Lanata I, Mongeot, Papillon II, Guanti, Torrens, Lanata II, Bessone, Turbessy, Gazals | Report | Brakni 35' Zouaoui, Bekhoucha Raouti, Yantrèn, Mansouri, Madoudou, Zouraghi, Lekhal, Hadji, Brakni, Chalane, Mahieddine | Attendance: 2.000; Referee: Riveccio |

| 17 December 1950 Round 11 | USM Blida | 1–1 | RU Alger | Blida |
| | Hadji 44' Zouaoui, Madoudou, Mansouri, Zouakou, Boumediene Bekhoucha Raouti, Zouraghi, Hadji, Khelifa, Mahieddine, Brakni, Mazouz | Report | Laillet 17' Messina, Brouillet, Jasseron, Rocher, Bouvier, Rimlinger, Figuières, Daube, Baylet, Lorenzo, Lailet | Stadium: FCB Stadium; Attendance: 2.000; Referee: Kerachi |

| 22 December 1950 Round 12 | RS Alger | 2–0 | USM Blida | Algiers |
| | Zérapha 56'; Maouch 69' Amadéo, Senane, Caillat, Verneuil, Sadi, Magliozzi, Maouch, Llorens, Buffard, Zerapha, Ponsetti | Report | Zouaoui, Bekhoucha Raouti, Mansouri, Madoudou, Ferhat, Zerrouki, Yantrène, Hadji, Mahieddine, Zouraghi, Mazouz | Stadium: Stade Municipal; Attendance: 1.500; Referee: Roméro |

| 21 January 1951 | USM Blida | P–P | MC Alger |
| | | [ Report] |

| 28 January 1951 Round 14 | O Hussein Dey | 2–1 | USM Blida | Hussein Dey |
| | Gomez 31', 52' Ehrard, Montovani, Santiago, Fiol, Ouzifi, Mokrane, Gomez, Fez, Belamine, Scriba, Sintès | Report | Hadji 54' Zouaoui, Bekhoucha Raouti, Mansouri, Reguieg, Madoudou, Bouguerra, Mazouz, Hadji, Mahieddine, Ferhat, Zouraghi | Attendance: 2.000; Referee: Chireaux |

| 18 February 1951 Round 15 | USM Blida | 1–4 | Stade Guyotville | Blida |
| | Cuba 2'; Valence 27'; Cioffi 57'; Cambrésy 60' Zaidi, Valence P, Bénéjean, Giorgetti, Gilabert, Cioffi, Cuba, Cambrésy, De Pasquale, Llorens, Ballester P. | Report | Mazouz 18' Zouaoui, Madoudou, Mansouri, Bekhoucha Raouti, Zouraghi, Bouguerra, Lekhal, Brakni, Hadji, Yantrène, Mazouz | Stadium: FCB Stadium; Attendance: 3.000; Referee: Izzo |

| 25 February 1951 Round 16 | AS Boufarik | 2–1 | USM Blida | Boufarik |
| | Navarro 35'; Voméro 37' Gervais, Massip A, Vicédo, Chazot, Gottvalles, Radegonde, Voméro, Massip M, Defrance, Bouricha, Navarro | Report | Mansouri 70' Zouaoui, Reguieg, Mansouri, Bouguerra, Zouraghi, Bekhoucha Raouti, Mazouz, Yantrène, Ferhat, Hadji, Lekhal | Referee: Lapasset |

| 11 March 1951 Round 17 | USM Blida | 1–2 | FC Blida | Blida |
| | Bekhoucha Raouti 71' Zouaoui; Reguieg, Mansouri, Bouguerra; Bekhoucha Raouti, Zouraghi; Madoudou, Ferhat, Mahieddine, Hadji, Lekhal | Report | Camand 3'; Ruiz 61' Raynaud, Giner, Pons, Hasni, Gascq, Arnaud, Riéra, Ruiz, Meftah, Camand, Rais | Stadium: FCB Stadium; Attendance: 3.000; Referee: Cabot |

| 18 March 1951 Round 18 | GS Alger | 3–0 | USM Blida | Algiers |
| | Giono 38', 89'; Gay 52' Testa, Ferrasse, Belmonte, Principato, Calmus A, Calmus R, Gay, Torrès, Déléo, Fortuné, Giono | Report | Zouaoui, Bouguerra, Mansouri, Madoudou, Bekhoucha Raouti, Chalane, Zouraghi, Khelifa, Mahieddine, Lekhal, Mazouz | Stadium: Municipal; Attendance: 5.000; Referee: Rivieccio |

| 1 April 1951 Round 13 | USM Blida | 2–2 | MC Alger | Blida |
| | Mahieddine 42'; Brakni ou Chalane 88' Zouaoui (red card), Hadji, Brakni, Mansouri, Bouguerra, Madoudou, Bekhoucha Raouti, Zouraghi, Mahieddine, Chalane, Mazouz | Report | Kouar 8'; Khabatou 80' Abtouche, Hamoutène, Abdallaoui, Khabatou, Bennour, Hamid, Deguigui, Kouar, Kouar II, Haâd, Guitoune | Stadium: FCB Stadium; Referee: Vals |

| 8 April 1951 Round 19 | USM Blida | 1–1 | AS Saint Eugène | Blida |
| | Chalane 9' Menacer, Bekhoucha Raouti, Mansouri, Bouguerra, Zouraghi, Reguieg, Brakni, Hadji, Chalane, Mahieddine, Mazouz | Report | Viadl 24' Boubekeur, Stépanof, Aboulker, Oliver, Berah, De Villeneuve, Vidal, Salem, Brouel, Govard, Rivas | Stadium: FCB Stadium; Attendance: 3.000; Referee: Izzo |

| 15 April 1951 Round 20 | US Ouest Mitidja | 0–2 | USM Blida | El Affroun |
| | Manchon, Andrada, Defnet, Achour, Rouquier, Benzaâf, Saidoune, Talbi, Pérez, Bensamet, Saês | Report | Chalane 42'; Mazouz 70' Menacer, Bouguerra, Mansouri, Bekhoucha Raouti, Madoudou, Zouraghi, Chalane, Hadji, Mahieddine, Brakni, Mazouz |

| 22 April 1951 Round 21 | USM Blida | 1–0 | O Marengo | Blida |
| 39 pts | Ferhat 27' Menacer, Bekhoucha Raouti, Mansouri, Bouguerra, Zouraghi, Ferhat, Mazouz, Hadji, Mahieddine, Madoudou, Chalane | Report | Dubin, Escriva, Besonne, Mougeot, Miramond, Oller, Navarette, Turbessy, Blanchi, Perrault, Cazol | Stadium: FCB Stadium; Attendance: 2.000; Referee: Rivieccio |

| 29 April 1951 Round 22 | RU Alger | 0–0 | USM Blida | Algiers |
| | Messina, Rocher, Brouillet, Daube, Jasseron, Florit, Haffar II, Riu, Baylé, Lorenzo, Ferrari | Report | Menacer, Bekhoucha Raouti, Bouguerra, Zouraghi, Mansouri, Madoudou, Mazouz, Ferhat, Mahieddine, Hadji, Chalane | Stadium: Municipal |

== Forconi Cup ==
| 5 November 1950 Fourth Round | USM Blida | 3–2 | AS Kouba | Birtouta |
| 14:30 | Ferhat 22'; Mazouz 50'; Mahieddine 60' Zouaoui, Mansouri, Madoudou, Bekhoucha Raouti, Bouguerra, Zouraghi, Mazouz, Brakni, Mahieddine, Ferhat, Hadji. | (1–0); Report | Poizat 87'; Rossetti 89' Candella, Mascarau, Arlandie, Gressien, Fragueau, Blaison, Mélia, Martinache, Rossetti, Mazouni, Poizat | Referee: Caratino |

| 3 December 1950 Fifth Round | USM Blida | 1–2 | MC Alger | Boufarik |
| 14:30 | Brakni 22' Zouaoui; Mansouri, Bekhoucha Raouti; Madoudou, Zouraghi; Ferhat, Hadji, Brakni, Ahmed Yantrèn, Mahieddine, Khelifa | (1–1); Report | Aït Saâda 43', 65' Abtouche, Abdelaoui, Oualiken, Khabatou, Bennour, Hamid, Aït Saâda, Deguigui, Hahad, Kouar, Guittoun | Stadium: Municipal; Attendance: 2.700; Referee: Caratino |

== Squad statistics ==
=== Playing statistics ===
| Pos. | Name | Division Honneur | | | | | | | | | | | | | | | | | | | | | | FC | | Total |
| Pos. | Name | 1 | 2 | 3 | 4 | 5 | 6 | 7 | 8 | 9 | 10 | 11 | 12 | 13 | 14 | 15 | 16 | 17 | 18 | 19 | 20 | 21 | 22 | 1 | 2 | Total |
|---|---|---|---|---|---|---|---|---|---|---|---|---|---|---|---|---|---|---|---|---|---|---|---|---|---|---|
| GK | (Algeria) Zouaoui | X | X | X | X | X | X | X | X | X | X | X | X | X | X | X | X | X | X | | | | | X | X | 20 |
| GK | (Algeria) Menacer | | | | | | | | | | | | | | | | | | | X | X | X | X | | | 4 |
| GK | (Algeria) Meradi | | | | | | | | | | | | | | | | | | | | | | | | | |
| DF | (Algeria) Mansouri | | | | X | X | X | X | X | X | X | X | X | X | X | X | X | X | X | X | X | X | X | X | X | 21 |
| DF | (Algeria) Bekhoucha Raouti | X | X | X | X | X | X | X | X | X | X | X | X | X | X | X | X | X | X | X | X | X | X | X | X | 24 |
| DF | (Algeria) Bouguerra | X | X | X | X | X | X | X | | | | | | X | X | X | X | X | X | X | X | X | X | X | | 18 |
| DF | (Algeria) Zerrouki | | | | | | | | X | | | | X | | | | | | | | | | | | | 2 |
| DF | (Algeria) Benhamouda | X | | | | | | | | | | | | | | | | | | | | | | | | 1 |
| MF | (Algeria) Zouraghi | X | X | X | | | | | X | X | X | X | X | X | X | X | X | X | X | X | X | X | X | X | X | 20 |
| MF | (Algeria) Madoudou | X | X | X | | | X | X | | X | X | X | X | X | X | X | | X | X | | X | X | X | X | X | 19 |
| MF | (Algeria) Zouakou | X | X | X | | | | | X | | | X | | | | | | | | | | | | | | 5 |
| FW | (Algeria) Mahieddine | | X | X | X | X | X | X | X | X | X | X | X | X | X | | | X | X | X | X | X | X | X | X | 21 |
| FW | (Algeria) Hadji | | | X | X | X | X | X | X | | X | X | X | X | X | X | X | X | | X | X | X | X | X | X | 20 |
| FW | (Algeria) Mazouz | X | X | | X | X | X | X | X | | | X | X | X | X | X | X | | X | X | X | X | X | X | | 19 |
| FW | (Algeria) Brakni | | X | | X | X | X | X | X | X | X | X | | X | | X | | | | X | X | | | X | X | 16 |
| FW | (Algeria) Chalane | X | X | X | X | X | X | X | | | X | | | X | | | | | X | X | X | X | X | | | 14 |
| FW | (Algeria) Lekhal | X | X | X | X | X | | | | X | X | | | | | X | X | X | X | | | | | | | 11 |
| FW | (Algeria) Ferhat | | | | | | X | X | X | X | | | X | | X | | X | X | | | | X | X | X | X | 12 |
| FW | (Algeria) Reguieg M. | X | | X | X | X | | | | | | | | | X | | X | X | | X | | | | | | 8 |
| FW | (Algeria) Yantrèn | | | | | | | | | X | X | | X | | | X | X | | | | | | | | X | 6 |
| FW | (Algeria) Khelifa | | | | | | | | | | | X | | | | | | | X | | | | | | X | 3 |
| FW | (Algeria) Fellous | | | | | | | | | X | | | | | | | | | | | | | | | | 1 |
| FW | (Algeria) Dahmane | | | | | | | | | | | | | | | | | | | | | | | | | |
| FW | (Algeria) Reguieg Ab | | | | | | | | | | | | | | | | | | | | | | | | | |

=== Goalscorers ===
Includes all competitive matches. The list is sorted alphabetically by surname when total goals are equal.

| Nat. | Player | Pos. | PD | FC | TOTAL |
|---|---|---|---|---|---|
| (Algeria) | Sid Ali Mahieddine | FW | 6 | 1 | 7 |
| (Algeria) | Belkacem Chalane | FW | 4 | 0 | 4 |
| (Algeria) | Abdelkader Mazouza | FW | 3 | 1 | 4 |
| (Algeria) | Rachid Hadji | FW | 3 | 0 | 3 |
| (Algeria) | Ahmed Yantrèn | FW | 2 | 0 | 2 |
| (Algeria) | Bachir Ferhat | FW | 1 | 1 | 2 |
| (Algeria) | Braham Brakni | FW | 0 | 1 | 1 |
| (Algeria) | Boumediene Bekhoucha Raouti | DF | 1 | 0 | 1 |
| (Algeria) | Abdelkrim Lekhal | MF | 1 | 0 | 1 |
| (Algeria) | Mohamed Madoudou | DF | 1 | 0 | 1 |
| (Algeria) | Ali Mansouri | DF | 1 | 0 | 1 |
| (Algeria) | Fellous | MF | 1 | 0 | 1 |
| Own Goals | | | 0 | 0 | 0 |
| Totals | | | 24 | 4 | 28 |

== Transfers ==
=== In ===
| Pos | Player | From club |
|---|---|---|
| GK | Zouaoui Abderrahmane | |

=== Out ===
| Pos | Player | To club |
|---|---|---|
| FW | Ahmed Benelfoul | AS Boufarik |
