= 1953 Latin Cup =

1953 club football tournament

Copa Latina 1953

Tournament details
- Host country: Portugal
- Dates: 4–7 June 1953
- Teams: 4 (from 1 confederation)
- Venue: 2 (in 2 host cities)

Final positions
- Champions: Reims (1st title)
- Runners-up: A.C. Milan
- Third place: Sporting CP
- Fourth place: Valencia

Tournament statistics
- Matches played: 4
- Goals scored: 18 (4.5 per match)
- Top scorers: (Portugal) João Martins; (4 goals)

The 1953 Latin Cup (Portuguese: Copa Latina 1953) was the fifth edition of the annual Latin Cup which was played by clubs of the Southwest European nations of France, Italy, Portugal, and Spain. The tournament was hosted by Portugal, and the French club Reims was the winner of the tournament after defeating A.C. Milan by a score of 3–0 in the final match.

== Participating teams ==
Team	Method of qualification	Previous appearances
Reims	1952–53 French Division 1 champions	1949
A.C. Milan	1952–53 Serie A 3rd place (Note: Inter Milan and Juventus FC declined participation in the tournament.)	1951
Sporting CP	1952–53 Primeira Divisão champions	1949, 1951, 1952
Valencia	1952–53 La Liga runners-up (Note: FC Barcelona declined participation in the tournament due to the 1952–53 Copa del Generalísimo.)	Debut

== Venues ==
The host of the tournament was Portugal, and the four matches were played across two stadiums in two cities.

Oeiras	1953 Latin Cup is located in Portugal	Porto
Estádio Nacional do Jamor	1953 Latin Cup is located in Portugal	Estádio das Antas
Capacity: 37,500	1953 Latin Cup is located in Portugal	Capacity: 60,000
Estádio Nacional do Jamor	1953 Latin Cup is located in Portugal	Estádio das Antas

== Tournament ==
=== Bracket ===
Semifinals
4 June – Porto
Reims	2
Valencia	1
4 June – Oeiras
A.C. Milan	4
Sporting CP	3

Final
7 June – Oeiras
Reims	3
A.C. Milan	0
Third place match
6 June – Oeiras
Sporting CP	4
Valencia	1

=== Semifinals ===
4 June 1953

Reims	2–1	Valencia
Méano 46'; Kopa 61'		Gago 27'

Estádio das Antas, Porto, Portugal
Referee: Giorgio Bernardi (Italy)

4 June 1953

A.C. Milan	4–3 (a.e.t.)	Sporting CP
Nordahl 66', 72'; Liedholm 96'; Frignani 118'		Vasques 20'; Martins 89', 106'

Estádio Nacional do Jamor, Oeiras, Portugal
Referee: Ramón Azón Roma (Spain)

=== Third place match ===
6 June 1953

Sporting CP	4–1	Valencia
Vasques 3', 62'; Martins 6', 46'		Badenes 80'

Estádio Nacional do Jamor, Oeiras, Portugal
Referee: Édouard Harzic (France)

=== Final ===
7 June 1953

Reims	3–0	A.C. Milan
Kopa 31', 74'; Appel 52'

Estádio Nacional do Jamor, Oeiras, Portugal
Referee: José Vieira da Costa (Portugal)

Reims	Milan

GK	(France) Paul Sinibaldi
DF	(France) Robert Jonquet
DF	(France) Armand Penverne
DF	(France) Roger Marche
MF	(France) Simon Zimny
MF	(France) Raymond Cicci
FW	(France) Raymond Kopa
FW	(Netherlands) Bram Appel
FW	(France) Jean Templin
FW	(France) Léon Glovacki
FW	(France) Francis Méano
Manager:
(France) Albert Batteux

GK	(Italy) Lorenzo Buffon
DF	(Italy) Francesco Zagatti
DF	(Italy) Arturo Silvestri
MF	(Sweden) Nils Liedholm
MF	(Italy) Omero Tognon
MF	(Italy) Celestino Celio
MF	(Italy) Carlo Annovazzi
MF	(Italy) Renzo Burini
FW	(Sweden) Gunnar Gren
FW	(Italy) Amleto Frignani
FW	(Sweden) Gunnar Nordahl
Manager:
(Italy) Mario Sperone

1953 Latin Cup Champions
(France)
Reims
1st title

== Goalscorers ==
Rank	Player	Team	Goals
1	(Portugal) João Martins	(Portugal) Sporting CP	4
2	(Portugal) Manuel Vasques	(Portugal) Sporting CP	3
2	(France) Raymond Kopa	(France) Reims	3
3	(Sweden) Gunnar Nordahl	(Italy) A.C. Milan	2
4	(Sweden) Nils Liedholm	(Italy) A.C. Milan	1
4	(Italy) Amleto Frignani	(Italy) A.C. Milan	1
4	(France) Francis Méano	(France) Reims	1
4	(Netherlands) Bram Appel	(France) Reims	1
4	(Spain) Quiliano Gago	(Spain) Valencia	1
4	(Spain) Manuel Badenes	(Spain) Valencia	1
