= 1951–52 USM Blida season =

USM Blida
1951–52 season
- President: Bachir Abdelouahab
- Head coach: Mohamed Khelifa
- Stadium: USB Stadium, Blida
- Division Honneur: 10th / 12
- Forconi Cup: Fifth Round
- Top goalscorer: League: Sid Ali Mahieddine (9 goals); All: Sid Ali Mahieddine (10 goals)

In the 1951–52 season, USM Blida competed in the Division Honneur for the 19th season French colonial era, as well as the Forconi Cup. They competed in Division Honneur, and the Forconi Cup.

== Pre-season and friendlies ==
9 September 1951 Tournois amicaux	USM Marengo	1–0	USM Blida	Marengo
	Ferhat (?)	Report		Stadium: Stade Municipal de Marengo

12 September 1951 Gala de l`Aid El Kebir	AS Boufarik	1–0	USM Blida	Boufarik
	Brionès 16'	Report		Attendance: 1.200

11 November 1951 Friendly	Maroc A (Morocco)	2–0	USM Blida	Casablanca
		Report

8 March 1952 Tournoi Amical (Coupe Benhabylès)	USM Blida	2–1	USM Sétif	Bologhine
15:45	Brinis 40' (pen.); Mazouz 73' Menacer, Bekhoucha Raouti, Mansouri, Zerrouki, Chalane, Brinis, Balilouli, Ghezal, Abdelkader, Dahmane, Mazouz	Report	Badji 85' Souma, Gafsa, Selmani, Saliraoui, Laklif II, Djeridi, Badji, Fitoussi, Kari, Bouzidi, Boukrissa	Stadium: Omar Hamadi Stadium; Referee: M. Belkessa

9 March 1952 Tournoi Amical (Coupe Benhabylès)	USM Blida	1–0	MO Constantine	Bologhine
15:45	Mahieddine 4' Menacer, Bekhoucha Raouti, Soum, Zouraghi, Hadji, Madoudou, Zahzah, Chalane, Mahieddine, Brakni, Boudjeltia	Report	Hadj, Bradai, Djabali, Benkenida, Bourtal, Maâmar, Ben Bakir II, Ben Salem, Ben Bakir I, Saidou, Bouskila	Stadium: Omar Hamadi Stadium; Referee: M. Kerrachi

13 March 1952 Friendly	USM Blida	1–6	(France) Stade Reims	Blida
15:00	Mazouz 30' Menacer, Zerrouki, Mansouri, Bekhoucha Raouti, Hadji, Zouraghi, Mazouz, Dahmane, Mahieddine, Brakni, Chalane	(1–3); 1	Abenoza; Jacowski, Jonquet, Marche, Zimny; Delcampe, Penverne; Villanova, Leblond, Appel, Jean Templin, Kopa	Stadium: USB; Referee: M. Mestre

== Competitions ==
=== Overview ===
Competition	Record								Started round	Final position / round	First match	Last match
Competition	G	W	D	L	GF	GA	GD	Win %	Started round	Final position / round	First match	Last match
Division Honneur	22	6	7	9	28	30	−2	27.27	—N/a	12th	16 September 1951	27 April 1952
Forconi Cup	2	1	0	1	3	3	+0	50.00	Fourth Round	Fifth Round	4 November 1951	2 December 1951
Total	24	7	7	10	31	33	−2	29.17				

=== Division Honneur ===
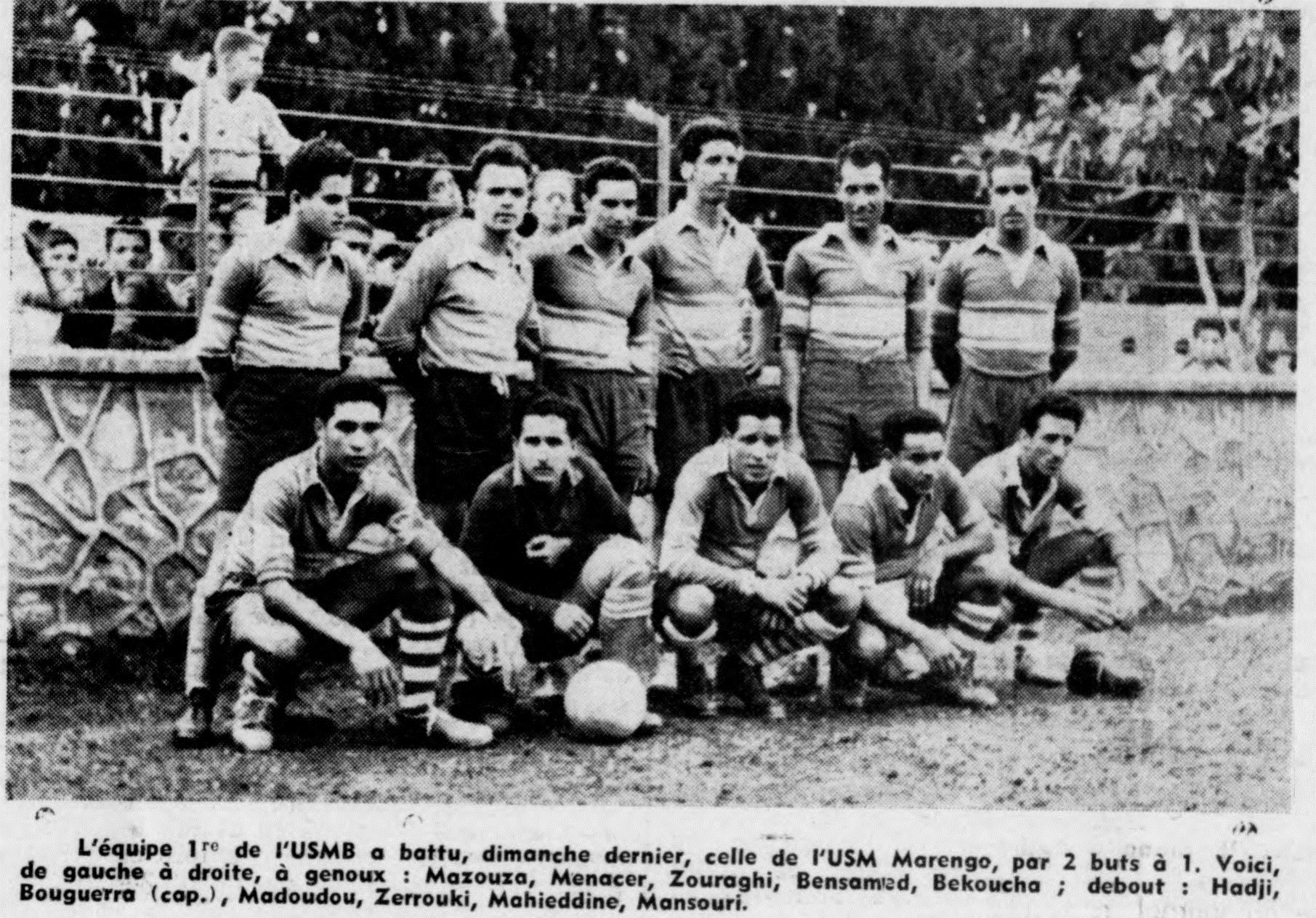
USM Blida Team in 1951 with From Left to Right: Stand Up : Hadji, Bouguerra (C), Madoudou, Zerrouki, Mahieddine, Mansouri. Sitting Mazouz, Menacer, Zouraghi, Bensamet, Bekhoucha Raouti.

==== League table ====
Pos	Team	Pld	W	D	L	GF	GA	GD	Pts	Qualification or relegation
1	AS Saint Eugène (C)	22	8	13	1	43	24	+19	51	Qualified for North African Championship
2	MC Alger	22	9	10	3	34	30	+4	50	
3	RS Alger	22	10	7	5	32	35	−3	49	
4	O Hussein Dey	22	11	4	7	45	33	+12	48	
5	AS Boufarik	22	8	8	6	39	41	−2	45 (Note: 1 point deducted?)	
6	FC Blidéen	22	8	8	6	52	32	+20	45	
7	RU Alger	22	7	7	8	27	31	−4	43	
8	S.Guyotville	22	5	10	7	30	32	−2	42	
9	GS Orléansville	22	6	7	9	38	41	−3	41	
10	USM Blida	22	6	7	9	28	30	−2	41	
11	GS Alger	22	4	8	10	32	44	−12	38	Relegated to 1952–53 First Division
12	USM Marengo	22	4	3	15	24	55	−31	33	Relegated to 1952–53 First Division

(C) Champions

==== Results by round ====
Round	1	2	3	4	5	6	7	8	9	10	11	12	13	14	15	16	17	18	19	20	21	22
Ground	H	A	H	A	H	A	H	A	H	H	A	A	H	A	H	A	H	A	H	A	A	H
Result	W	L	L	D	W	W	D	L	D	W	L	D	W	L	D	W	L	L	L	D	L	D
Position	1	4	10	10	8	4	5	5	5	4	6	6	4	5	4	4	7	8	10	9	10	10

Updated to match(es) played on 27 April 1952. Source: Competitive matches
A = Away; H = Home; W = Win; D = Draw; L = Loss

=== Matches ===
Win Draw Loss

16 September 1951 Round 1	USM Blida	2–0	MC Alger	Blida
15:10	Mazouz 52', 72' Menacer, Mansouri, Bekhoucha Raouti, Zerrouki, Bouguerra, Madoudou, Zouraghi, Hadji, Bensamet, Mahieddine, Mazouz.	Report	Zebairi, Abdelaoui, Oualiken, Khabatou, Bennour, Hamid, Kouar A, Guittoun, Hahad, Kouar II, Khelil.	Stadium: USB Stadium; Attendance: 2.000; Referee: Attanasio J.

23 September 1951 Round 2	GS Orléansville	2–0	USM Blida	Orléansville
14:00	Bertoli 2'; Moussaoui 23' Merle, Mellet, Maiza, Aubert, Moussaoui, Medjaher, Bertoli Joseph, Gevaudan, Castello, Mihoubi, Daoud	Report	Menacer, Mansouri, Zerrouki, Bekhoucha Raouti, Madoudou, Zouraghi, Hadji, Bensamet, Mazouz, Mahieddine, Dahmane	Referee: Caratino

30 September 1951 Round 3	USM Blida	0–2	AS Boufarik	Blida
	Menacer, Zerrouki, Bouguerra, Mansouri; Bekhoucha Raouti, Zouraghi, Madoudou, Bensamet, Hadji, Mahieddine, Mazouz	Report	Navarro 57'; Defrance 85' Gervais, Massip, Amiel, Chazot; Massa, Roman; Voméro, Reichert, Defrance, Said-Said, Navarro	Stadium: USB Stadium; Attendance: 2.200; Referee: Cabot

7 October 1951 Round 4	FC Blida	1–1	USM Blida	Blida
	Meftah 42' Raynaud, Sicard, Gasc, Giner, Schmidt, Hasni, Meftah, Riera, Camand, Ruiz, Batiat	Report	Brakni 61' Menacer, Bouguerra, Mansouri, Bekhoucha Raouti, Madoudou, Zouraghi, Dahmane, Brakni, Mahieddine, Hadji, Mazouz	Stadium: FCB Stadium; Attendance: 2.100; Referee: Derradji

14 October 1951 Round 5	USM Blida	2–1	USM Marengo	Blida
	Mahieddine 56'; Dahmane 66' Menacer, Bekhoucha Raouti, Madoudou, Chalane, Mansouri, Zouraghi, Mazouz, Dahmane, Mahieddine, Hadji, Brakni	Report	Bouanem 52' Saadi Abdelkader, Djelfi, Moussaoui, Ferhat, Saadi Ali, Boukalfa, Bouanem, Maroc 2, Abdette, Abbés, Touhami.	Stadium: USB Stadium; Attendance: 1.700; Referee: Garofalo

21 October 1951 Round 6	GS Alger	2–6	USM Blida	Belcourt
	Deléo 80'; Ferrer Jean 89' Pellegrino, Ferrasse, Belmonte, Ferrer Jules, Torrès, Calmus Armand, Cerdan, Golec, Ferrer Jean, Fortuné, Deléo	Report	Chalane 7'; Mahieddine 26'; Hadji 40'; Mazouz 49'; Brakni 60'; Chalane 66' Menacer, Madoudou, Mansouri, Bekhoucha Raouti, Zouraghi, Hadji, Chalane, Dahmane, Mahieddine, Brakni, Mazouz	Stadium: Stade municipal Referee: Mazocchi

28 October 1951 Round 7	USM Blida	1–1	AS Saint Eugène	Blida
	Chalane 1' (15s) Menacer, Madoudou, Mansouri, Bekhoucha Raouti, Zouraghi, Hadji, Chalane, Dahmane, Mahieddine, Brakni, Mazouz	Report	Aouadj 10' Boubekeur, Vidal, Agius, Aboulker, Aouadj, Valenza, Alarcon, Baeza, Rouet, Boret, Collongues	Stadium: USB Stadium; Attendance: 3.500; Referee: Kerrachi

18 November 1951 Round 8	RS Alger	1–0	USM Blida	Belcourt
	Llorens 22' Diehl, Magliozzi II, Caillat, Vermeuil; Zerapha, Sadi; Maouch, Magliozzi I, Ponsetti, Llorens, Zaibek	Report	Menacer, Bekhoucha Raouti, Mansouri, Madoudou; Hadji, Zouraghi; Mazouz, Brakni, Mahieddine, Dahmane, Chalane	Stadium: Stade municipal Referee: Marrone

25 November 1951 Round 9	USM Blida	1–1	Stade Guyotville	Blida
	Brakni 82' (pen.); Chalane (red card) Meradi, Bekhoucha Raouti, Mansouri, Madoudou, Zouraghi, Hadji, Zerrouki, Brakni, Mahieddine, Boumbadji Benyoucef, Chalane	Report	Valence (penalty missed); Cuba 78'; Llorens (red card) Zaidi, Salort V, Ballester, Valence, Llorens, De Pasquale, Cuba P, Ballester, Vitiello, Cambrésy, Errera	Stadium: USB Stadium; Referee: Graziani

9 December 1951 Round 10	USM Blida	2–1	Olympique Hussein Dey	Boufarik
	Dahmane 65'; Santiago 75' (o.g.) Meradi, Zerrouki, Mansouri, Madoudou, Hadji, Zouraghi, Zahzah Ahmed, Dahman, Mahieddine, Boumbadji Benyoucef, Mazouz	Report	Fez 38' Erhard, Montovani, Santiago, Coronel, Perret, Ouzifi, Sintès, Lefumat, Fiol, Fez, Kader	Attendance: 2.000; Referee: Andre Attanasio

23 December 1951 Round 11	RU Alger	1–0	USM Blida	Belcourt
	Baylé 84' Deneuvic, Rocher, Friand, Riu, Florit, Jasseron, Coll, Faglin, Baylé, Lorenzo, Ferrari	Report	Meradi, Bekhoucha Raouti, Mansouri, Bouguerra, Hadji, Zouraghi, Mazouz, Dahman, Boumbadji Benyoucef, Chalane, Mahieddine	Stadium: Stade municipal

30 December 1951 Round 12	MC Alger	1–1	USM Blida	Saint Eugène
	Deguigui 70' Zebairi, Hamoutène, Oualiken, Khabatou, Hamid, Abdelaoui, Dahmoune, Deguigui, Kouar, Guittoun, Hahad	Report	Mahieddine 4' Menacer, Bekhoucha Raouti, Mansouri, Madoudou, Hadji, Bouguerra, Mazouz, Zouraghi, Mahieddine, Boumbadji Benyoucef, Dahmane	Stadium: Stade Communal de Saint Eugène; Referee: Favre (Oran)

20 January 1952 Round 13	USM Blida	3–0	GS Orléansville	Blida
15:00	Mahieddine 27', 85'; Brakni 35' Menacer; Bekhoucha Raouti, Mansouri, Madoudou; Zouraghi, Hadji; Bouguerra, Brakni, Mahieddine, Chalane, Boumbadji	Report	Machtou, Maylet, Aubert, Polger, Moussaoui, Gevaudan, Maunier, Daoud, Mihoubi, Graziano	Stadium: USB Stadium; Attendance: 2.000; Referee: M. Giner

10 February 1952 Round 14	AS Boufarik	1–0	USM Blida	Boufarik
	Voméro 88' Gervais, Massip, Vicédo, Chazot, Benelfoul, Navarro A., Voméro, Said-Said, Defrance, Reichert, Navarro V.	Report	Menacer, Bekhoucha Raouti, Mansouri, Madoudou; Hadji, Zouraghi; Bouguerra, Chalane, Mahieddine, Brakni, Boumbadji	Attendance: 3.500; Referee: M. Mazocchi

17 February 1952 Round 15	USM Blida	1–1	FC Blida	Blida
	Zerrouki 87' Menacer, Madoudou, Zerrouki, Bekhoucha Raouti, Hadji, Zouraghi, Brakni, Mazouz, Mahieddine, Dahmane, Bouguerra	Report	Rais 66' Raynaud, Giner, Gasq, Hasni, Sicard, Riéra, Schmitt, Ruiz, Meftah, Camand, Rais	Stadium: USB Stadium; Attendance: 3.200; Referee: M. Riveccio

24 February 1952 Round 16	USM Marengo	1–3	USM Blida	Marengo
	Saâdi Ali 80' Saidi (Arbouche) (Maroc I), Djelfi, Moussaoui, Maroc II, Boukhalfa, Saâdi II, Boualem, Touhami, Abbès, Ferhat	Report	Mahieddine 3', 88'; Hadji 55' Menacer, Bouguerra, Mansouri, Bekhoucha Raouti, Hadji, Zerrouki, Dahmane, Mazouz, Mahieddine, Brakni, Chalane	Referee: M. Attanasio

23 March 1952 Round 17	USM Blida	1–3	GS Alger	Blida
15:10	Mahieddine 14' Menacer, Zerrouki, Mansouri, Bekhoucha Raouti, Hadji, Zouraghi, Chalane, Mazouz, Mahieddine, Dahmane, Madoudou	Report	Deléo 38'; Torrès 50'; Azef 70' Fabiano, Principato, Belmonte, Ferasse, Torrès, Calmus A., Biton, Fortuné, Cerdan, Azef, Deléo	Stadium: USB Stadium; Attendance: 2.300; Referee: M. Riveccio

30 March 1952 Round 18	AS Saint Eugène	2–0	USM Blida	Saint Eugène
	Rivas 44'; Alarcon 54' Boubekeur, Oliver, Béringuer, Aboulker, Bérah, Valenza, Alarcon, Brouel, Rovet, Boret, Rivas	Report	Menacer, Chalane, Zerrouki, Bouguerra, Hadji, Zouraghi, Mazouz, Brakni, Mahieddine, Zahzah, Dahmane	Stadium: Stade Communal de Saint Eugène; Attendance: 4.500; Referee: M. Riveccio

13 April 1952 Round 19	USM Blida	1–3	RS Alger	Blida
	Dahmane 12' (penalty missed) Menacer, Zerrouki, Mansouri, Boumbadji, Hadji, Zouraghi, Zahzah, Brakni, Mahieddine, Dahmane, Mazouz	Report	Meslin 47'; Llorens 69', 75' Diehl, Mangin, Mayens, Pons, Magliozzi I, Vermeuil, Mezin, Bendjerou Meslin, Magliozzi II, Llorens	Stadium: USB Stadium; Attendance: 2.200; Referee: M. Cabot

20 April 1952 Round 20	Stade Guyotville	1–1	USM Blida	Guyotville
	Vitiello 20' Zaidi, Salort, Ballester V., Bénéjean, de Pasquale, Cioffi, Cambrésy, Llorens, Vitiello, Giorgetti, Gilabert	Report	Madoudou (Mahieddine, Brakni) 17' Menacer, Zerrouki, Mansouri, Bouguerra, Hadji, Zouraghi, Madoudou, Dahmane, Mahieddine, Brakni, Mazouz	Referee: M. Attanasio

27 April 1952 Round 21	Olympique Hussein Dey	2–0	USM Blida	Hussein Dey
	Vals 2'; Scriba 49' Vadel, Montovani, Santiago, Todori, Belamine, Ourzifi, Serrano, Scriba, Pérez, Fez, Vals	Report	Menacer, Bekhoucha Raouti, Mansouri, Zouraghi, Zerrouki, Bouguerra, Mazouz, Brakni, Mahieddine, Dahmane, Hadji	Stadium: Stade Communal de Hussein Dey; Attendance: 1.200; Referee: M. Derradji

4 May 1952 Round 22	USM Blida	2–2	RU Alger	Blida
	Madoudou 25'; Zouraghi (Mazouz) 78' Menacer, Bekhoucha Raouti, Zerrouki, Bouguerra, Hadji, Zouraghi, Madoudou, Brakni, Mahieddine, Dahmane, Mazouz	Report	Coll 17'; Baylé 85' Lavoignat, Rocher, Brouillet, Bouvier, Lorenzo, Friand, Riu, Pérez, Ferrari, Baylé, Coli	Stadium: USB Stadium; Attendance: 1.200; Referee: M. J. Attanasio

== Forconi Cup ==
4 November 1951 4th	USM Blida	3–1	O Tizi Ouzou	Kouba
	Brakni 19' (pen.); Mahieddine 40'; Mazouz 55' Menacer; Bekhoucha Raouti, Mansouri; Madoudou, Zouraghi; Hadji, Mazouz, Brakni, Mahieddine, Dahmane, Chalane	Report	Bouzar II 17' Berkani, Allouche, Haouchine, Madiou, Bouzar Boussad I, Bouaziz, Aimène, Hacène, Bouzar Omar II, Salhi, Belaidi	Stadium: Kouba; Attendance: Record; Referee: Giner

2 December 1951 5th	Stade Guyotville	2–0	USM Blida	Hussein Dey
	Cambrésy 65'; Valence 70' Zaidi, Salort, Ballester V, Valence, De Pasquale, Giorgetti, Monset P, Ballester, Cambrésy, Vitiello, Errera	Report	Meradi; Bekhoucha Raouti, Mansouri; Madoudou, Zouraghi, Hadji; Mazouz, Bouguerra, Boumbadji Benyoucef, Mahieddine, Brakni	Referee: Cabot

== Squad information ==
=== Playing statistics ===
Pos.	Name	Division Honneur																						FC		Total
Pos.	Name	1	2	3	4	5	6	7	8	9	10	11	12	13	14	15	16	17	18	19	20	21	22	1	2	Total
GK	Menacer	X	X	X	X	X	X	X	X				X	X	X	X	X	X	X	X	X	X	X	X		20
GK	Meradi									X	X	X													X	4
GK	Mekdad																									0
GK	Hamade																									0
GK	Benganif																									0
DF	Mansouri	X	X	X	X	X	X	X	X	X	X	X	X	X	X		X	X		X	X	X		X	X	21
DF	Bekhoucha Raouti	X	X	X	X	X	X	X	X	X		X	X	X	X	X	X	X				X	X	X	X	20
DF	Bouguerra	X		X	X							X	X	X	X	X	X		X		X	X	X		X	14
DF	Zerrouki	X	X	X						X	X					X	X	X	X	X	X	X	X			13
DF	Zahzah										X								X	X						3
DF	Echeikh																									
MF	Zouraghi	X	X	X	X	X	X	X	X	X	X	X	X	X	X	X		X	X	X	X	X	X	X	X	21
MF	Madoudou	X	X	X	X	X	X	X	X	X	X		X	X	X	X		X			X		X	X	X	19
MF	Brinis																									
FW	Mahieddine	X	X	X	X	X	X	X	X	X	X	X	X	X	X	X	X	X	X	X	X	X	X	X	X	24
FW	Hadji	X	X	X	X	X	X	X	X	X	X	X	X	X	X	X	X	X	X	X	X	X	X	X	X	24
FW	Mazouz	X	X	X	X	X	X	X	X		X	X	X			X	X	X	X	X	X	X	X	X	X	21
FW	Dahmane		X		X	X	X	X	X		X	X	X			X	X	X	X	X	X	X	X	X		18
FW	Brakni				X	X	X	X	X	X				X	X	X	X		X	X	X	X	X	X	X	17
FW	Chalane					X	X	X	X	X		X		X	X		X	X	X					X		12
FW	Boumbadji									X	X	X	X	X	X					X					X	8
FW	Bensamet	X	X	X																						3
FW	Abdelkader																									
FW	Fellous																									
FW	Reguieg M.																									
FW	Lekhal																									
FW	Reguieg Ab																									

=== Goalscorers ===
Includes all competitive matches. The list is sorted alphabetically by surname when total goals are equal.

Nat.	Player	Pos.	DH	FC	TOTAL
(Algeria)	Sid Ali Mahieddine	FW	9	1	10
(Algeria)	Braham Brakni	FW	4	1	5
(Algeria)	Mokhtar Dahmane	FW	4	0	4
(Algeria)	Abdelkader Mazouz	FW	3	1	4
(Algeria)	Hocine Chalane	FW	2	0	2
(Algeria)	Rachid Hadji	FW	2	0	2
(Algeria)	Mohamed Madoudou	MF	1	0	1
(Algeria)	Rabah Zerrouki	DF	1	0	1
Own Goals			2	0	1
Totals			28	3	31

== Youths teams ==
Reserve team
Position: 9

Pos	Team	Pld	W	D	L	GF	GA	GD	Pts
1	USM Blida	22	6	5	11	21	29	−8	39

Source: Source · Source 2

Third team
Position: 7

Pos	Team	Pld	W	D	L	GF	GA	GD	Pts
1	USM Blida	20	7	0	13	17	23	−6	34

Junior team
Position: 8

Pos	Team	Pld	W	D	L	GF	GA	GD	Pts
1	USM Blida	22	8	1	13	37	43	−6	39

Cadet team
Position: 10

Pos	Team	Pld	W	D	L	GF	GA	GD	Pts
1	USM Blida	20	4	4	12	23	37	−14	31

Minime team
Position: 8

Pos	Team	Pld	W	D	L	GF	GA	GD	Pts
1	USM Blida	18	3	6	9	5	28	−23	29
