= 1950 Coupe de France final =

- Event: 1949–50 Coupe de France
Reims	RC Paris
2	0
- Date: 14 May 1950
- Venue: Olympique Yves-du-Manoir, Colombes
- Referee: Marius Veyret
- Attendance: 61,722

The 1950 Coupe de France final was a football match held at Stade Olympique Yves-du-Manoir, Colombes on 14 May 1950, that saw Stade de Reims defeat RC Paris 2–0 thanks to goals by Francis Méano and André Petitfils.

== Match details ==
14 May 1950

Reims	2–0	RC Paris
Méano 81'; Petitfils 83'

Stade Olympique Yves-du-Manoir, Colombes
Attendance: 61,722
Referee: Marius Veyret

GK	(France) Paul Sinibaldi
DF	(France) André Jacowski
DF	(France) Roger Marche
DF	(France) Armand Penverne
DF	(France) Robert Jonquet
MF	(France) Pierre Bini
MF	(France) Albert Batteux (c)
FW	(France) Pierre Flamion
FW	(Netherlands) Bram Appel
FW	(France) André Petitfils
FW	(France) Francis Méano
Manager:
(France) Henri Roessler Assistant referees: Fourth official:

GK	(France) René Vignal
DF	(France) André Grillon
DF	(France) Marcel Salva
DF	(France) Roger Gabet
DF	(France) Roger Lamy	(c)
MF	(France) Fred Nikitis
MF	(France) Jean Courteaux
FW	(France) André Tessier
FW	(France) Roger Quenolle
FW	(Iceland) Albert Guðmundsson
FW	(France) Ernest Vaast
Manager:
(France) Paul Baron

== See also ==
- 1949–50 Coupe de France
