= 1952–53 AC Milan season =

Milan Associazione Calcio
1952–53 season
- President: Umberto Trabattoni
- Manager: Mario Sperone, then Gunnar Gren
- Stadium: San Siro
- Serie A: 3rd
- Latin Cup: Runner-up
- Top goalscorer: League: Gunnar Nordahl (26); All: Gunnar Nordahl (28)
- Average home league attendance: 22,681
| Home colours | Away colours |

During the 1952–53 season Associazione Calcio Milan competed in Serie A and Latin Cup.

== Summary ==
The 1952–1953 season saw a change of coach for Milan: Mario Sperone replaced Lajos Czeizler. Midfielders Celestino Celio, Eros Beraldo and Franco Pedroni joined the club, respectively from Genoa, Padova and Como, while defenders Francesco Zagatti and Alfio Fontana were added from the youth team.

Milan finished the championship in third place behind champions Inter and Juventus. With 26 goals Gunnar Nordahl was once again the tournament's top scorer: this was the third time that the Swede won the capocannoniere title. Despite not having won the league, the club participated in the Latin Cup as a replacement for Juventus. For this competition, Gunnar Gren sat on the bench as coach. The team was defeated in the final: after overcoming the hosts Sporting Lisbon in extra time in the semifinal, they were beaten 3–0 by Stade Reims.

The 1952–1953 season was the last of the Gre-No-Li trio: at the end of the European campaign, in fact, Gunnar Gren left Milan and moved to Fiorentina.

== Squad ==
Note: Flags indicate national team as defined under FIFA eligibility rules; some limited exceptions apply. Players may hold more than one non-FIFA nationality.

| Pos. | Nation | Player |
|---|---|---|
| GK | ITA | Lorenzo Buffon |
| GK | ITA | Antonio Seveso |
| DF | ITA | Alfio Fontana |
| DF | ITA | Franco Pedroni |
| DF | ITA | Arturo Silvestri |
| DF | ITA | Francesco Zagatti |
| DF | ITA | Germano Travagini |
| MF | ITA | Eros Beraldo |
| MF | ITA | Carlo Annovazzi (Captain) |
| MF | ITA | Celestino Celio |

| Pos. | Nation | Player |
|---|---|---|
| MF | ITA | Giuseppe Radaelli |
| MF | ITA | Omero Tognon (vice-Captain) |
| MF | ITA | Giancarlo Pistorello |
| MF | SWE | Nils Liedholm |
| FW | SWE | Gunnar Gren |
| FW | SWE | Gunnar Nordahl |
| FW | ITA | Amleto Frignani |
| FW | ITA | Angelo Longoni |
| FW | ITA | Renzo Burini |

=== Transfers ===
In
| Pos. | Name | from | Type |
|---|---|---|---|
| MF | Eros Beraldo | Padova | – |
| MF | Celestino Celio | Genoa | – |
| DF | Franco Danova | Seregno | – |
| MF | Gianni Fermi | Genoa | – |
| DF | Franco Pedroni | Como | – |
| DF | Germano Travagini | Udinese | – |

Out
| Pos. | Name | To | Type |
|---|---|---|---|
| GK | Ezio Bardelli | Como | – |
| DF | Andrea Bonomi | Brescia | – |
| DF | Pietro Grosso | Roma | – |
| DF | Emilio Lavezzari | Seregno | – |
| MF | Enzo Menegotti | Modena | – |
| FW | Mario Renosto | Roma | – |
| DF | Carlo Scaccabarozzi | Padova | – |
| MF | Luciano Scroccaro | Padova | – |
| FW | Giuseppe Secchi | Padova | – |

== Competitions ==
=== Serie A ===
==== League table ====
| Pos | Team | Pld | W | D | L | GF | GA | GD | Pts | Qualification or relegation |
|---|---|---|---|---|---|---|---|---|---|---|
| 1 | Internazionale (C) | 34 | 19 | 9 | 6 | 46 | 24 | +22 | 47 | |
| 2 | Juventus | 34 | 18 | 9 | 7 | 73 | 40 | +33 | 45 | |
| 3 | Milan | 34 | 17 | 9 | 8 | 64 | 34 | +30 | 43 | Qualified for the 1953 Latin Cup |
| 4 | Napoli | 34 | 15 | 11 | 8 | 53 | 43 | +10 | 41 | |
| 5 | Bologna | 34 | 16 | 7 | 11 | 52 | 43 | +9 | 39 | |

Source: Panini
(C) Champions

==== Results by round ====
| Round | 1 | 2 | 3 | 4 | 5 | 6 | 7 | 8 | 9 | 10 | 11 | 12 | 13 | 14 | 15 | 16 | 17 | 18 | 19 | 20 | 21 | 22 | 23 | 24 | 25 | 26 | 27 | 28 | 29 | 30 | 31 | 32 | 33 | 34 |
|---|---|---|---|---|---|---|---|---|---|---|---|---|---|---|---|---|---|---|---|---|---|---|---|---|---|---|---|---|---|---|---|---|---|---|
| Ground | A | A | H | A | H | H | A | H | A | H | A | H | A | A | H | H | A | H | H | A | H | H | A | H | A | A | H | A | H | A | H | A | H | H |
| Result | W | W | W | L | W | D | L | W | L | W | W | W | W | W | D | L | W | L | W | D | W | L | W | D | W | D | D | D | L | L | W | W | D | D |
| Position | 1 | 1 | 1 | 3 | 2 | 3 | 4 | 4 | 5 | 5 | 3 | 3 | 2 | 2 | 2 | 3 | 2 | 3 | 2 | 2 | 2 | 2 | 2 | 2 | 2 | 2 | 2 | 2 | 3 | 3 | 3 | 3 | 3 | 3 |

Source: http://calcio-seriea.net/allenatori_squadra/1948/277/
A = Away; H = Home; W = Win; D = Draw; L = Loss; = Leader; = Relegation to 1953–54 Serie B

==== Matches ====
| 14 September 1952 1 | Milan | 2–0 | Novara | Milan |
| | Pedroni 47'; Burini 87' | | | Stadium: Stadio San Siro; Attendance: 25,000; Referee: Orlandini |

| 21 September 1952 2 | Palermo | 0–1 | Milan | Palermo |
| | | | 8' Nordahl | Stadium: Stadio La Favorita; Attendance: 22,000; Referee: Pieri |

| 28 September 1952 3 | Milan | 1–0 | SPAL | Milan |
| | Gren 73' | | | Stadium: Stadio San Siro; Attendance: 40,000; Referee: Massai |

| 5 October 1952 4 | Roma | 2–1 | Milan | Rome |
| | Galli 48', 65' | | 33' Nordahl | Stadium: Stadio Nazionale; Attendance: 35,000; Referee: Agnolin |

| 12 October 1952 5 | Milan | 2–1 | Sampdoria | Milan |
| | Silvestri 85'; Nordahl 90' | | 68' Bassetto | Stadium: Stadio San Siro; Attendance: 30,000; Referee: Bellè |

| 19 October 1952 6 | Triestina | 1–1 | Milan | Trieste |
| | Curti 32' | | 69' Liedholm | Stadium: Stadio Comunale; Attendance: 20,000; Referee: Massai |

| 2 November 1952 7 | Milan | 0–1 | Inter | Milan |
| | | | 85' Lorenzi | Stadium: Stadio San Siro; Attendance: 52,000; Referee: Massai |

| 9 November 1952 8 | Milan | 4–0 | Pro Patria | Milan |
| | Liedholm 46'; Nordahl 51'; Burini 60', 75' | | | Stadium: Stadio San Siro; Attendance: 25,000; Referee: Occhinegro |

| 16 November 1952 9 | Napoli | 4–2 | Milan | Naples |
| | Jeppson 9', 53'; Zagatti 60' (o.g.); Amadei 69' | | 34', 88' Nordahl | Stadium: Stadio della Liberazione; Attendance: 38,000; Referee: Pieri |

| 23 November 1952 10 | Udinese | 0–1 | Milan | Udine |
| | | | 60' Gren | Stadium: Stadio Moretti; Attendance: 15,000; Referee: Liverani |

| 30 November 1952 11 | Milan | 3–1 | Lazio | Milan |
| | Burini 17'; Gren 18'; Nordahl 49' | | 90' Bredesen | Stadium: Stadio San Siro; Attendance: 40,000; Referee: Bellè |

| 7 December 1952 12 | Juventus | 0–3 | Milan | Turin |
| | | | 18' Nordahl; 41', 76' Frignani | Stadium: Stadio Comunale; Attendance: 45,000; Referee: Massai |

| 14 December 1952 13 | Milan | 4–2 | Como | Milan |
| | Frignani 48'; Burini 63' (pen.); Silvestri 88'; Liedholm 90' | | 53' Gratton; 74' Origgi | Stadium: Stadio San Siro; Attendance: 22,000; Referee: De Leo |

| 21 December 1952 14 | Milan | 2–1 | Fiorentina | Milan |
| | Nordahl 22'; Liedholm 50' | | 67' Ghersetich | Stadium: Stadio San Siro; Attendance: 20,000; Referee: Rigato |

| 6 January 1953 15 | Torino | 1–1 | Milan | Turin |
| | Sentimenti III 10' | | 13' Frignani | Stadium: Stadio Filadelfia; Attendance: 18,000; Referee: Bellè |

| 11 January 1953 16 | Bologna | 2–0 | Milan | Bologna |
| | La Forgia 10', 87' | | | Stadium: Stadio Comunale; Attendance: 30,000; Referee: Orlandini |

| 18 January 1953 17 | Milan | 5–1 | Atalanta | Milan |
| | Burini 24', 28' (pen.); Nordahl 39', 74', 90' | | 60' Sørensen | Stadium: Stadio San Siro; Attendance: 20,000; Referee: Corallo |

| 25 January 1953 18 | Novara | 2–1 | Milan | Novara |
| | Miglioli 6', 77' | | 59' (pen.) Burini | Stadium: Stadio Comunale; Attendance: 10,000; Referee: Massai |

| 1 February 1953 19 | Milan | 5–0 | Palermo | Milan |
| | Nordahl 20', 48', 62'; Gren 35'; Burini 42' | | | Stadium: Stadio San Siro; Attendance: 16,000; Referee: Rigato |

| 8 February 1953 20 | SPAL | 1–1 | Milan | Ferrara |
| | Busnelli 38' (pen.) | | 83' Longoni | Stadium: Stadio Comunale; Attendance: 14,000; Referee: Bellè |

| 15 February 1953 21 | Milan | 4–1 | Roma | Milan |
| | Nordahl 57', 74'; Liedholm 60', 86' | | 32' Perissinotto | Stadium: Stadio San Siro; Attendance: 35,000; Referee: Agnolin |

| 22 February 1953 22 | Sampdoria | 2–1 | Milan | Genoa |
| | Righetto 45'; Conti 47' | | 59' Frignani | Stadium: Stadio Luigi Ferraris; Attendance: 26,000; Referee: Liverani |

| 1 March 1953 23 | Milan | 4–1 | Triestina | Milan |
| | Nordahl 5', 28', 65'; Radaelli 63' | | 59' Sørensen | Stadium: Stadio San Siro; Attendance: 25,000; Referee: Marchese |

| 8 March 1953 24 | Inter | 0–0 | Milan | Milan |
| | | | | Stadium: Stadio San Siro; Attendance: 42,000; Referee: Gemini |

| 15 March 1953 25 | Pro Patria | 0–1 | Milan | Busto Arsizio |
| | | | 66' Frignani | Stadium: Stadio Comunale; Attendance: 10,000; Referee: Agnolin |

| 22 March 1953 26 | Milan | 2–2 | Napoli | Milan |
| | Nordhal 33'; Longoni 48' | | 10' Vitali; 34' Formentin | Stadium: Stadio San Siro; Attendance: 35,000; Referee: Agnolin |

| 29 March 1953 27 | Milan | 0–0 | Udinese | Milan |
| | | | | Stadium: Stadio San Siro; Attendance: 25,000; Referee: Corallo |

| 5 April 1953 28 | Lazio | 0–0 | Milan | Rome |
| | | | | Stadium: Stadio Nazionale; Attendance: 18,000; Referee: Piemonte |

| 12 April 1953 29 | Milan | 1–2 | Juventus | Milan |
| | Nordahl 14' | | 11' Praest; 69' Boniperti | Stadium: Stadio San Siro; Attendance: 35,000; Referee: Orlandini |

| 19 April 1953 30 | Como | 3–1 | Milan | Como |
| | Baldini 49', 65'; Ghiandi 74' | | 84' Nordahl | Stadium: Stadio Giuseppe Sinigaglia; Attendance: 15,000; Referee: Maurelli |

| 3 May 1953 31 | Fiorentina | 0–3 | Milan | Florence |
| | | | 36', 73', 89' Burini | Stadium: Stadio Comunale; Attendance: 25,000; Referee: Scaramella |

| 10 May 1953 32 | Milan | 5–1 | Torino | Milan |
| | Nordahl 41'; Annovazzi 42'; Burini 45'; Sentimenti III 51' (o.g.); Frignani 78' | | 84' Buhtz | Stadium: Stadio San Siro; Attendance: 10,000; Referee: Maurelli |

| 24 May 1953 33 | Milan | 1–1 | Bologna | Milan |
| | Nordahl 44' | | 57' Bacci | Stadium: Stadio San Siro; Attendance: 10,000; Referee: Rigato |

| 31 May 1953 34 | Atalanta | 1–1 | Milan | Bergamo |
| | Testa 41' | | 5' Nordahl | Stadium: Stadio Comunale; Attendance: 5,000; Referee: Corallo |

=== Latin Cup ===
==== Semifinals ====
| 4 June 1953 1 | Milan (Italy) | 4–3 (a.e.t.) | (Portugal) Sporting CP | Lisbon |
| | Nordahl 66', 72'; Liedholm 96'; Frignani 118' | | 5' Vasquez; 89', 106' Martins | Stadium: Stadio Nazionale; Attendance: 25,000; Referee: Azon |

==== Final ====
| 7 June 1953 1 | Stade Reims (France) | 3–0 | (Italy) Milan | Lisbon |
| | Kopa 31', 74'; Appel 52' | | | Stadium: Stadio Nazionale; Attendance: 15,000; Referee: Costa |

== Statistics ==
=== Squad statistics ===
| Competition | Points | Home | | | | | | Away | | | | | | Total | | | | | | GD |
| Competition | Points | G | W | D | L | Gs | Ga | G | W | D | L | Gs | Ga | G | W | D | L | Gs | Ga | GD |
|---|---|---|---|---|---|---|---|---|---|---|---|---|---|---|---|---|---|---|---|---|
| 1952–53 Serie A | 43 | 17 | 12 | 3 | 2 | 45 | 15 | 17 | 5 | 6 | 6 | 19 | 19 | 34 | 17 | 9 | 8 | 64 | 34 | +30 |
| 1953 Latin Cup | – | 0 | 0 | 0 | 0 | 0 | 0 | 2 | 1 | 0 | 1 | 4 | 6 | 2 | 1 | 0 | 1 | 4 | 6 | −2 |
| Total | – | 17 | 12 | 3 | 2 | 45 | 15 | 19 | 6 | 6 | 7 | 23 | 25 | 36 | 18 | 9 | 9 | 68 | 40 | +28 |

=== Players statistics ===
| No. | Pos | Nat | Player | Total | | 1952-53 Serie A | | 1953 Latin Cup | |
| No. | Pos | Nat | Player | Apps | Goals | Apps | Goals | Apps | Goals |
|---|---|---|---|---|---|---|---|---|---|
| | GK | (Italy) ITA | Lorenzo Buffon | 35 | -40 | 33 | -34 | 2 | -6 |
| | DF | (Italy) ITA | Arturo Silvestri | 29 | 2 | 27 | 2 | 2 | 0 |
| | DF | (Italy) ITA | Francesco Zagatti | 27 | 0 | 25 | 0 | 2 | 0 |
| | MF | (Italy) ITA | Carlo Annovazzi | 30 | 1 | 28 | 1 | 2 | 0 |
| | MF | (Italy) ITA | Celestino Celio | 28 | 0 | 26 | 0 | 2 | 0 |
| | MF | (Italy) ITA | Omero Tognon | 29 | 0 | 27 | 0 | 2 | 0 |
| | MF | (Sweden) SWE | Nils Liedholm | 32 | 7 | 30 | 6 | 2 | 1 |
| | FW | (Sweden) SWE | Gunnar Gren | 31 | 4 | 29 | 4 | 2 | 0 |
| | FW | (Sweden) SWE | Gunnar Nordahl | 34 | 28 | 32 | 26 | 2 | 2 |
| | FW | (Italy) ITA | Amleto Frignani | 34 | 8 | 32 | 7 | 2 | 1 |
| | FW | (Italy) ITA | Renzo Burini | 33 | 13 | 31 | 13 | 2 | 0 |
| | GK | (Italy) ITA | Antonio Seveso | 1 | 0 | 1 | 0 | 0 | 0 |
| | DF | (Italy) ITA | Franco Pedroni | 21 | 1 | 21 | 1 | 0 | 0 |
| | MF | (Italy) ITA | Eros Beraldo | 10 | 0 | 10 | 0 | 0 | 0 |
| | FW | (Italy) ITA | Angelo Longoni | 8 | 2 | 8 | 2 | 0 | 0 |
| | MF | (Italy) ITA | Giancarlo Pistorello | 5 | 0 | 5 | 0 | 0 | 0 |
| | DF | (Italy) ITA | Germano Travagini | 5 | 0 | 5 | 0 | 0 | 0 |
| | MF | (Italy) ITA | Giuseppe Radaelli | 3 | 1 | 3 | 1 | 0 | 0 |
| | DF | (Italy) ITA | Alfio Fontana | 1 | 0 | 1 | 0 | 0 | 0 |

== See also ==
- AC Milan

== Bibliography ==
- Almanacco illustrato del Milan, ed: 2, March 2005. Panini.
- Enrico Tosi. La storia del Milan, May 2005. Italia/Italy cid Tosi.
- Milan. Sempre con te, December 2009. Mondadori. 2009. ISBN 978-88-04-59118-4.
