= Francis Méano =

French footballer (1931–1953)

Personal information
- Date of birth: 22 May 1931
- Place of birth: Puyloubier, France
- Date of death: 25 June 1953 (aged 22)
- Place of death: Witry-lès-Reims, France
- Height: 1.68 m (5 ft 6 in)
- Positions: Left winger; inside forward

Senior career*
Years	Team	Apps	(Gls)
1947–1948	SSMC Miramas		
1948–1949	AS Aix		
1949–1953	Reims	114	(45)

International career
1949	France U18		
- France military
1949–1952	France	2	(0)
- * Club domestic league appearances and goals

Francis Méano (22 May 1931 – 25 June 1953) was a French footballer who played as a left winger and inside forward.

== Club career ==
Méano started his career at SSMC Miramas in 1947, with the team later naming their stadium after him. In 1948, he joined Division d'Honneur side AS Aix-en-Provence, before joining Stade de Reims in 1949. He scored 11 goals in the 1949–50 Division 1 season, becoming the youngest player to score 10 goals in a season until Hugo Ekitike in 2022. That season, he also helped Reims win the Coupe de France, including scoring in the final against RC Paris. He missed most of the 1950–51 season with a fractured fibula, but scored 13 goals in the following season.

The 1952–53 season was considered one of Méano's best seasons, scoring 12 goals as he helped Reims win both the French Division 1 title and the Latin Cup, where he scored in both the semi-finals against Valencia and the final against AC Milan. In total, Méano scored over 50 goals for Reims in all competitions, including 45 in Division 1.

== International career ==
Méano was part of the France under-18 national team that won the 1949 FIFA Youth Tournament. He later made two appearances with the France national team, with his debut coming at the age of 18 on 11 December 1949, in a 1950 FIFA World Cup qualification play-off defeat to Yugoslavia in Florence. His other appearance for France came on 19 October 1952, in a 2–1 friendly win against Austria.

== Personal life and death ==
Francis was the older brother of Guy Méano, who notably played as a forward for Stade Rennais. Méano married his wife, Josiane, on 19 May 1953 at the Reims Cathedral.

A street in Méano's hometown of Puyloubier is named after him.

=== Death ===
On 25 June 1953, less than a month after winning both the Division 1 title and Latin Cup with Reims, Méano was a passenger in a Citroën Traction Avant, along with Josiane, his father, Spanish goalkeeper and former teammate Antonio Abenoza, and his fiancée, when it collided with a hearse in Witry-lès-Reims, killing all of them. Shortly after the accident, a storm broke out which hindered rescue efforts.

Following the Méano family's deaths, a vigil was set up by some of Francis' teammates, including Raymond Kopa, Jean Templin, and the Sinibaldi brothers Paul, Pierre, and Noël. Later, their funeral was held at the Reims Cathedral, officiated by Bishop Louis-Augustin Marmottin, and attended by thousands of people, including then-Reims president Victor Canard, technical director Henri Germain, and France national team captain Roger Marche.

A few years after Méano's death, the side stand at the Stade Auguste-Delaune was named after him. The original stand was demolished during renovations in 2006, but was later rebuilt.

== Honours ==
Reims

- Coupe de France: 1949–50
- French Division 1: 1952–53
- Latin Cup: 1953

France U18

- FIFA Youth Tournament: 1949
