= André Jacowski =

Franco-Polish footballer (1922–2002)

Personal information
- Birth name: Andrzej Żakowski
- Date of birth: 5 December 1921
- Place of birth: Wiatowice, Poland
- Date of death: 5 February 2002 (aged 80)
- Place of death: Reims, France
- Height: 1.74 m (5 ft 9 in)
- Position: Defender

Senior career*
Years	Team	Apps	(Gls)
- Arago sport orléanais
1945–1953	Stade de Reims		
1953–1954	RC Paris		

International career
1952	France	2	(0)

Managerial career
- 1954–1957: Chartres
- * Club domestic league appearances and goals

André Jacowski (5 December 1921 – 5 February 2002) was a Franco-Polish footballer who played as a defender for Stade de Reims between 1945 and 1953. He also played two matches for the French national team in 1952. He was a member of the great Stade de Reims team of the early 1950s, which won two Ligue 1 titles (1948–49 and 1952–53), one Coupe de France in 1950, and the 1953 Latin Cup.

== Playing career ==
=== Club career ===
Born on 5 December 1921 in Wiatowice, (Note: Some sources wrongly claim that he was born on 5 December 1922.) near Kraków, Andrzej Żakowski began his football career at the amateur club Arago sport orléanais, one of the many Catholic clubs affiliated with the Gymnastic and Sports Federation of French Patronages (FGSPF) that offered a culturally familiar sporting to home many Polish immigrants and war refugees. Shortly after the liberation of France in 1945, he joined Stade de Reims, which had been recently promoted the top flight, where he eventually established himself as a regular at right back.

Together with Paul Sinibaldi, Roger Marche, and Albert Batteux, he was a member of the great Stade de Reims team of the early 1950s that won two Ligue 1 titles (1948–49 and 1952–53) and one Coupe de France in 1950, starting in the final at Colombes on 14 May, where he helped his side keep a clean-sheet in a 2–0 victory his future club RC Paris. On the following day, the journalists of the French newspaper L'Équipe stated that he and Marche "saved Reims in the first half with last-ditch tackles and dives on the ball", and then "held firm after the restart and were, with goalkeeper Sinibaldi, their team's best players". Three years later, he helped Reims win the 1953 Latin Cup, the forerunner of the European Cup, although he did not start in the final. He stayed at Reims for eight years, from 1945 until 1953, when he moved to Ligue 2 team RC Paris, where he retired in 1954, aged 33. in total, he scored 2 goals in 190 league matches.

=== International career ===
In April and May 1952, the 30-year-old Jacowski earned two international caps for France in friendly matches against Portugal and Belgium, helping his side to 3–0 and 2–1 victories, respectively. After the former match, the journalists from L'Équipe stated that he "made a very good international debut", highlighting that he had "never played an easier match" due to Portugal's gradual slowdown.

== Managerial career ==
After his career as a player ended, Jacowski became a coach, taking over Chartres in 1954, but his first season there ended in relegation to DH.

== Death ==
Jacowski died in Reims on 5 February 2002, at the age of 80. (Note: Some sources wrongly claim that he died on 20 April 2002.)

== Honours ==
Nice

- Ligue 1:
  - Champions (1): 1949–50 and 1952–53
- Coupe de France:
  - Champions (1): 1950
- Latin Cup:
  - Champions (1): 1953
