= Cornaredo Stadium =

Multi-purpose stadium in Lugano, Switzerland

Stadio di Cornaredo
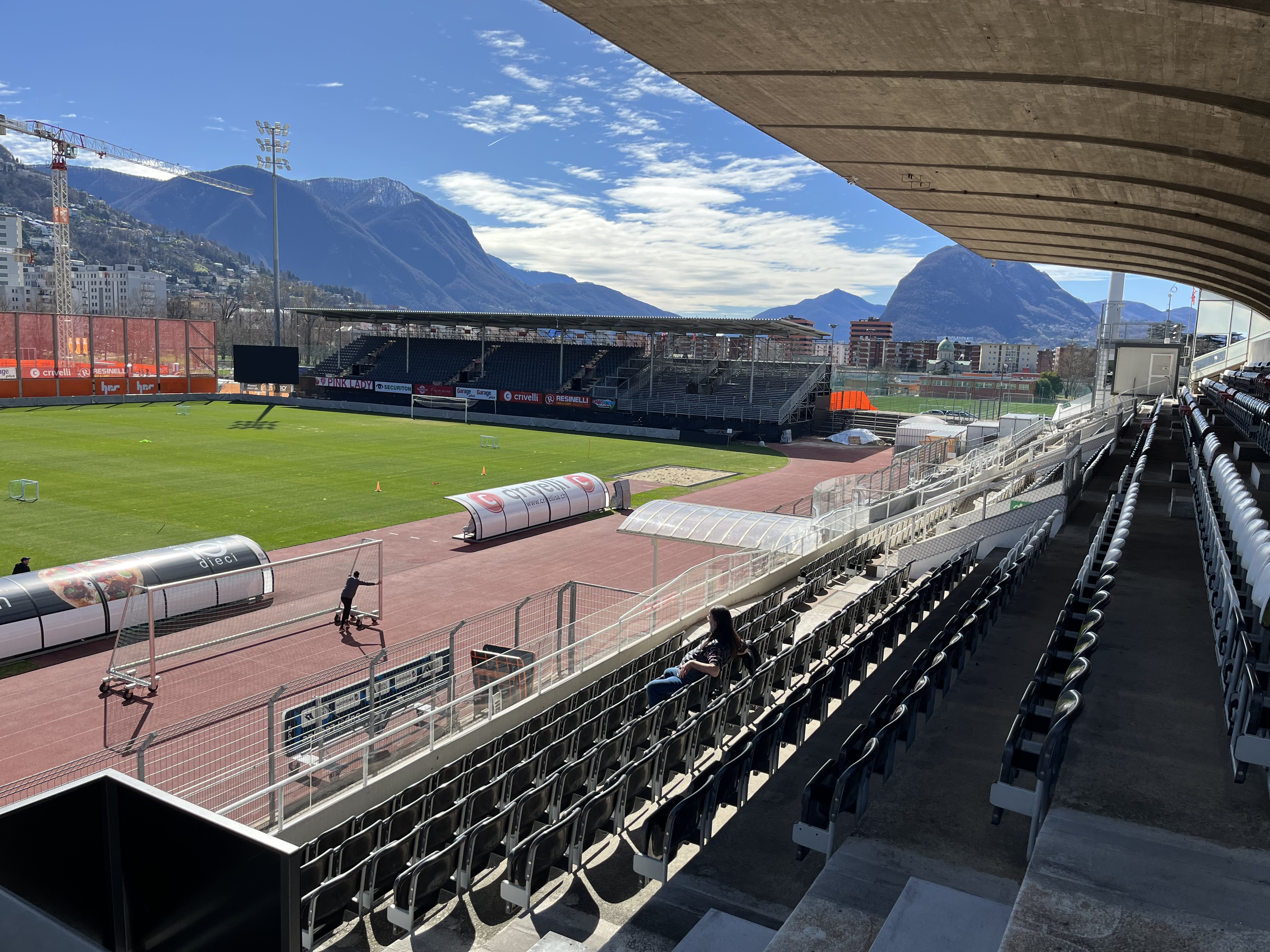
- Interactive map of Stadio di Cornaredo
- Location: Lugano, Ticino, Switzerland
- Coordinates: 46°01′25″N 8°57′42″E
- Owner: City of Lugano
- Capacity: 6,330
- Field size: 105 x 68 m

Construction
- Built: 1951
- Closed: 2026

Tenant
- FC Lugano

Cornaredo Stadium is a multi-purpose stadium in Lugano, Switzerland. It is used mostly for football matches. It is a home ground of FC Lugano. The stadium has a capacity of 6,330. During the 1954 FIFA World Cup, it hosted one game.

During the spring of 2008, the political authorities of Lugano announced a plan to renew the stadium to fulfil the Swiss Football League requirements for Super League stadiums, however, the works never commenced.

== 1954 FIFA World Cup ==
20 June 1954
17:00 (CET)

Italy	4–1	Belgium
Pandolfini 41' (pen.); Galli 48'; Frignani 58'; Lorenzi 78'	Report	Anoul 81'

Cornaredo Stadium, Lugano
Attendance: 26,000
Referee: Carl Erich Steiner (Austria)

== See also ==
- List of football stadiums in Switzerland
