= 1949 Latin Cup =

1949 club football tournament

Copa Latina de 1949

Tournament details
- Host country: Spain
- Dates: 26 June – 3 July 1949
- Teams: 4 (from 1 confederation)
- Venue: 3 (in 2 host cities)

Final positions
- Champions: Barcelona (1st title)
- Runners-up: Sporting CP
- Third place: Torino
- Fourth place: Reims

Tournament statistics
- Matches played: 4
- Goals scored: 20 (5 per match)
- Top scorers: (Portugal) Fernando Peyroteo; (3 goals)

The 1949 Latin Cup (Spanish: Copa Latina de 1949) was the first edition of the annual Latin Cup which was played by clubs of the Southwest European nations of France, Italy, Portugal, and Spain. The tournament was hosted by Spain, and the Spanish club Barcelona was the winner of the tournament after defeating Sporting CP by a score of 2–1 in the final match.

== Participating teams ==
Team	Method of qualification	Previous appearances
Reims	1948–49 French Division 1 champions	Debut
Torino	1948–49 Serie A champions	Debut
Sporting CP	1948–49 Primeira Divisão champions	Debut
Barcelona	1948–49 La Liga champions	Debut

== Venues ==
The host of the tournament was Spain, and three stadiums, two in Madrid and one in Barcelona, were selected to host the matches for the tournament.

Madrid		1949 Latin Cup is located in Spain	Barcelona
Real Madrid CF Stadium		1949 Latin Cup is located in Spain	
Capacity: 75,000	Capacity: 35,700	1949 Latin Cup is located in Spain	Capacity: 60,000
Real Madrid CF Stadium		1949 Latin Cup is located in Spain	Camp de Les Corts

== Tournament ==
=== Bracket ===
Semifinals
26 June – Madrid
Sporting CP	3
Torino	1
26 June – Barcelona
Barcelona	5
Reims	0

Final
3 July – Madrid
Barcelona	2
Sporting CP	1
Third place match
3 July – Barcelona
Torino	5
Reims	3

=== Semifinals ===
26 June 1949

Sporting CP	3–1	Torino
Peyroteo 15', 26', 48'		Giuseppe Marchetto 57'

Metropolitan Stadium, Madrid, Spain
Attendance: 35,000
Referee: Victor Sdez (France)

26 June 1949

Barcelona	5–0	Reims
Seguer 5'; Mateu Nicolau 25'; Rodríguez 59', 67'; José Canal 73'

Camp de Les Corts, Barcelona, Spain
Referee: Giacomo Bertolio (Italy)

=== Third place match ===
3 July 1949

Torino	5–3	Reims
Pravisano 2', 58'; Giuseppe Marchetto 18'; Carapellese 63', 75'		Sinibaldi 40'; Méano 62'; Flamion 76'

Camp de Les Corts, Barcelona, Spain
Referee: Ramón Azón Roma (Spain)

=== Final ===
3 July 1949

Barcelona	2–1	Sporting CP
Seguer 10'; Basora 50'		Correia 28'

Real Madrid CF Stadium, Madrid, Spain
Referee: Victor Sdez (France)

Barcelona	Sporting CP

GK	1	(Spain) Juan Velasco
DF	2	(Spain) Francisco Calvet
DF	3	(Spain) Curta
DF	4	(Spain) Ricardo Calo
MF	5	(Spain) José Gonzalvo
MF	6	(Spain) Mariano Gonzalvo (c)
MF	7	(Spain) José Canal
FW	8	(Spain) Estanislau Basora
FW	9	(Spain) César Rodríguez
FW	10	(Spain) Alfonso Navarro
FW	11	(Spain) Josep Seguer
Manager:
(Uruguay) Enrique Fernández

GK	1	(Portugal) João Azevedo
DF	2	(Portugal) Octávio Barrosa
DF	3	(Portugal) Manuel Marques (c)
DF	4	(Portugal) Juvenal da Silva
MF	5	(Portugal) Carlos Canário
MF	6	(Portugal) Veríssimo Alves
FW	7	(Portugal) Jesus Correia
FW	8	(Portugal) Manuel Vasques
FW	9	(Portugal) Fernando Peyroteo
FW	10	(Portugal) José Travassos
FW	11	(Portugal) Albano
Manager:
(Portugal) Cândido de Oliveira

1949 Latin Cup Champions
(Francoist Spain)
Barcelona
1st title

== Goalscorers ==
Rank	Player	Team	Goals
1	(Portugal) Fernando Peyroteo	(Portugal) Sporting CP	3
2	(Italy) Riccardo Carapellese	(Italy) Torino	2
2	(Italy) Giuseppe Marchetto	(Italy) Torino	2
2	(Italy) Silvano Pravisano	(Italy) Torino	2
2	(Spain) César Rodríguez	(Spain) Barcelona	2
2	(Spain) Josep Seguer	(Spain) Barcelona	2
3	(Spain) Estanislau Basora	(Spain) Barcelona	1
3	(Spain) José Canal	(Spain) Barcelona	1
3	(Argentina) Mateu Nicolau	(Spain) Barcelona	1
3	(France) Pierre Flamion	(France) Reims	1
3	(France) Francis Méano	(France) Reims	1
3	(France) Pierre Sinibaldi	(France) Reims	1
3	(Portugal) Jesus Correia	(Portugal) Sporting CP	1
