= Guy Méano =

French footballer (1934–2023)

Personal information
- Date of birth: 11 November 1934
- Place of birth: Aix-en-Provence, France
- Date of death: 1 February 2023 (aged 88)
- Place of death: Aix-en-Provence, France
- Height: 1.70 m (5 ft 7 in)
- Position: Forward

Youth career
- 1946–1947: SSMC Miramas
- 1947–1953: AS Aix

Senior career*
Years	Team	Apps	(Gls)
1953–1956	AS Aix		
1956–1960	Stade Rennais	134	(40)
1960–1963	Cannes		
1963–1966	SSMC Miramas		
- * Club domestic league appearances and goals

Guy Méano (11 November 1934 – 1 February 2023) was a French footballer who played as a forward.

== Career ==
Méano started his career at SSMC Miramas, before joining AS Aix in 1947, where he made his professional debut in 1953. In 1956, he joined French Division 2 side Stade Rennais, where he became part of their attack alongside Mahi Khennane and Stanislas Dombeck. During the 1957–58 French Division 2 season, he scored 17 goals as Rennes finished second and got promoted back to the French Division 1. That season, he also scored his first hat-trick for the club, during a 6–3 win against CO Roubaix-Tourcoing in April 1958.

In 1960, he joined Cannes in Division 2, spending three seasons there before returning to SSMC Miramas in 1963.

== Personal life and death ==
He was the brother of French international footballer Francis Méano, who died in a car accident in June 1953 at the age of 22.

Guy died on 1 February 2023, at the age of 88.
