= Antonio Abenoza =

Spanish footballer (1926–1953)

Personal information
- Date of birth: 1 September 1926
- Place of birth: Alcolea de Cinca, Spain
- Date of death: 25 June 1953 (aged 26)
- Place of death: Witry-lès-Reims, France
- Height: 1.76 m (5 ft 9 1/2 in)
- Position: Goalkeeper

Senior career*
Years	Team	Apps	(Gls)
–1946	ESA Brive		
1946–1952	Reims	23	(0)
1952–1953	Troyes-Savinienne		
- * Club domestic league appearances and goals

Antonio Abenoza (1 September 1926 – 25 June 1953) was a Spanish footballer who played as a goalkeeper.

== Career and death ==
Abenoza made 26 appearances for Stade de Reims, including 23 in the French Division 1.

On 25 June 1953, Abenoza and his fiancee, along with Francis Méano and both Méano's wife and father, were passengers in a Citroën Traction Avant, when it collided with a hearse in Witry-lès-Reims, killing all of them.

He was the last Spanish goalkeeper in Ligue 1 until Sergio Rico joined Paris Saint-Germain in 2020.
