= Dombeck =

Dombeck is a surname. Notable people with the surname include:

- Carola Dombeck (born 1960), German gymnast
- Michael Dombeck (born 1948), American conservationist, educator, scientist, and outdoorsman
- Stanislas Dombeck (1931–2013), French footballer and manager
