= Silvano Pravisano =

Italian footballer (1925–2020)

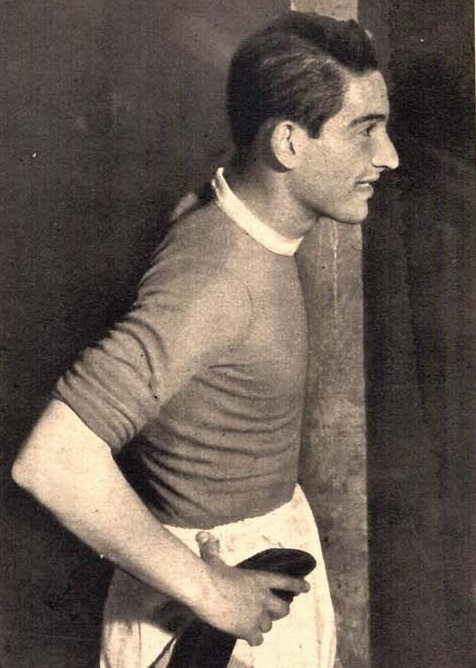
- Pravisano in 1951

Personal information
- Date of birth: 20 January 1925
- Place of birth: Udine, Italy
- Date of death: 23 March 2020 (aged 95)
- Place of death: Udine, Italy
- Position: Forward

Senior career*
Years	Team	Apps	(Gls)
1943–1949	Udinese	114	(37)
1949	Torino	7	(1)
1949–1951	Legnano	68	(34)
1951–1956	Genoa	86	(9)
1956–1958	Parma	30	(4)
Total		306	(85)
- * Club domestic league appearances and goals

Silvano Pravisano (20 January 1925 – 23 March 2020) was an Italian footballer who played as a forward.

== Playing career ==
Pravisano started his career at Udinese at the age of 17. While playing for the club, he also worked as a clerk for the Ferrovie dello Stato Italiane until 1948, following the appointment of Aldo Olivieri. In the 1947–48 Serie B season, he finished as the club's top scorer, with 9 goals in 32 matches, as Udinese were relegated back to Serie C. The following season, he scored 11 goals in 33 matches in Serie C to get them promoted back to Serie B. Overall, he played 114 matches for Udinese, scoring 37 goals, alongside four matches in the 1944 Campionato Alta Italia.

In 1949, Pravisano joined Torino, after their team had been killed in the Superga air disaster. He played 7 matches for the club in Serie A, scoring once, as well scoring twice against Stade de Reims in the 1949 Latin Cup and being awarded the man of the match, before being sold to Serie B side Legnano in November 1949, where he scored 34 goals in 68 matches across two seasons, and helped them get promoted back to Serie A.

In 1951, he joined Genoa, where he spent five seasons before joining Parma, eventually retiring in 1958.

== Coaching career ==
Following his retirement, he worked as a coach for various teams, including Tisana, Maianese, Esperia di Udine, Sangiorgina di San Giorgio di Nogaro, Udinese's youth sector, Sangiorgina di Udine, and Pasianese.

In 2015, while coaching at Cjarlins Muzane, the FIGC Regional Committee awarded the team a certificate of merit for their commitment to amateur football.

== Personal life and death ==
Pravisano had two children. Along with coaching, he also worked as a surveyor, as well as a physical education teacher in Udine. Additionally, he served as the regional president of the Italian Football Coaches Association from 1982 to 1988.

Pravisano died on 23 March 2020, at the age of 95. At the time of his death, he was the oldest living Udinese player.
