= Noël Sinibaldi =

French footballer (1920–2003)

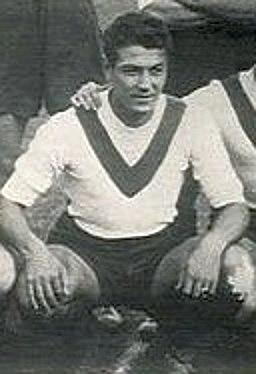
- Sinibaldi in 1947

Personal information
- Date of birth: 10 January 1920
- Place of birth: Montemaggiore, Corsica, France
- Date of death: 28 October 2003 (aged 83)
- Position: Striker

Senior career*
Years	Team	Apps	(Gls)
1946–1947	Nîmes		
1947–1948	Toulouse		
1948–1949	Reims		
1949–1950	Cannes		
1950–1952	Angers		
1952–1955	Draguignan		

Managerial career
- 1953–1956: Draguignan
- * Club domestic league appearances and goals

Noël Sinibaldi (10 January 1920 – 28 October 2003) was a French football player and manager.

== Early and personal life ==
Born in Montemaggiore, Corsica, Sinibaldi's two brothers Pierre and Paul were also footballers.

== Career ==
Sinibaldi played who played as a striker for Nîmes, Toulouse, Reims, Cannes, Angers and Draguignan. He also managed Draguignan.
