= Pierre Sinibaldi =

French footballer (1924–2012)

- Sinibaldi in 1948

Personal information
- Date of birth: 29 February 1924
- Place of birth: Montemaggiore, France
- Date of death: 24 January 2012 (aged 87)
- Position: Striker

Senior career*
Years	Team	Apps	(Gls)
1942–1944	Troyes		
1944–1953	Reims		
1953–1954	Nantes		
1954–1955	Lyon		
1955–1956	Perpignan		

International career
1946–1948	France	2	(0)

Managerial career
- 1956–1959: Perpignan
- 1959–1960: Luxembourg
- 1960–1966: Anderlecht
- 1966–1968: Monaco
- 1969–1971: Anderlecht
- 1971–1975: Las Palmas
- 1975–1976: Sporting de Gijón
- 1979–1980: Toulon
- * Club domestic league appearances and goals

Pierre Sinibaldi (29 February 1924 – 24 January 2012) was a French football player, who played as a striker. His career as manager spanned a quarter of a century.

In the 1960s and again in the early 1970s, he coached R.S.C. Anderlecht with whom he previously won four Belgian Championships between 1962 and 1966. As a player for Stade de Reims (1944–1953), he won two French Championships (1949, 1953) and the French Cup (1950); in 1947, he was the top scorer in the Division 1 with 33 goals. Sinibaldi, whose brothers Paul (goalkeeper) and Noël also played in Reims, was selected twice for the France national team, the first time for a 2–1 win against England in 1946.

== Honours ==
=== Player ===
Reims

- Ligue 1: 1948–49, 1952–53

=== Manager ===
Anderlecht

- Belgian First Division: 1961–62, 1963–64, 1964–65, 1965–66
- Belgian Cup: 1964–65
- Inter-Cities Fairs Cup: runner-up 1969-70

=== Individual ===
Reims

- Ligue 1 top scorer: 1946–47 (33 goals)
