= Ricardo Calo =

Spanish footballer (1918–1980)

Personal information
- Full name: Ricardo Rodríguez Álvarez
- Date of birth: 12 October 1918
- Place of birth: León, Spain
- Date of death: 8 May 1980 (aged 61)
- Place of death: León, Spain
- Position: Defender

Senior career*
Years	Team	Apps	(Gls)
1939–1940	SEU León		
1940–1941	Triángulo		
1941–1944	Cultural Leonesa		
1944–1950	Barcelona		
1950–1953	Real Zaragoza		
1953–1955	Lleida		
1955–1958	Cultural Leonesa		

Managerial career
- 1957–1958: Cultural Leonesa
- * Club domestic league appearances and goals

Ricardo Rodríguez Álvarez, better known as Ricardo Calo (12 October 1918 – 8 May 1980) was a Spanish footballer who played as a defender for Barcelona in the 1940s. He was the brother of César, the second-highest goal scorer in the history of Barcelona.

== Career ==
Born in the Castile and León town of León on 12 October 1918, (Note: Some sources wrongly state that he was born on 12 August 1918, or even on 12 August 1916.) Calo began his career at his hometown club SEU León in 1939, aged 21, from which he joined Triángulo, and then Cultural Leonesa in 1941, with whom he played for three years, until 1944, when he was signed by Barcelona.

Calo stayed at Barça for six years, from 1944 until 1950, scoring a total of 4 goals in 84 matches, most of which alongside his brother César, who played as a forward, becoming the highest goal scorer in the history of Barcelona at the time. He was noted for his speed and indomitable fighting spirit. Together with the likes of Mariano Gonzalvo, László Kubala, and his brother César, he was a member of the great Barça team of the late 1940s, which won three La Liga titles (1944–45, 1947–48, and 1948–49), one Copa Eva Duarte in 1948, and the Latin Cup in 1949, starting in the latter final, helping his side to a 2–1 win over Sporting.

In 1950, Calo left Barça to join Real Zaragoza on a free transfer, being one of the many signings of the newly-arrived coach Luis Urquiri, who went on to guide his team into a promotion to the top flight in 1951. He made his debut for Zaragoza on 10 September 1950, helping his side to a 4–0 win over Lucena, and played his last match for them on 3 May 1953, which ended in a 2–0 loss to Valencia. Following Zaragoza's relegation in 1953, he moved to Segunda División side, Lleida, where he played two years, from 1953 until 1955, when he returned to Cultural Leonesa, then in the top flight. His first season there, however, ended in relegation, and in his last season in 1958, he worked as a player-coach, overseeing 15 matches as the club was relegated to the Tercera División. In total, he scored 1 goal in 71 La Liga matches for Barça, Zaragoza, and Cultural.

== Death ==
Calo died in León on 8 May 1980, at the age of 61.

== Honours ==
FC Barcelona

- La Liga
  - Champions (2): 1944–45 and 1948–49
- Latin Cup
  - Champions (1): 1949
- Copa Eva Duarte
  - Champions (1): 1948
