= Crisenoy =

- Commune
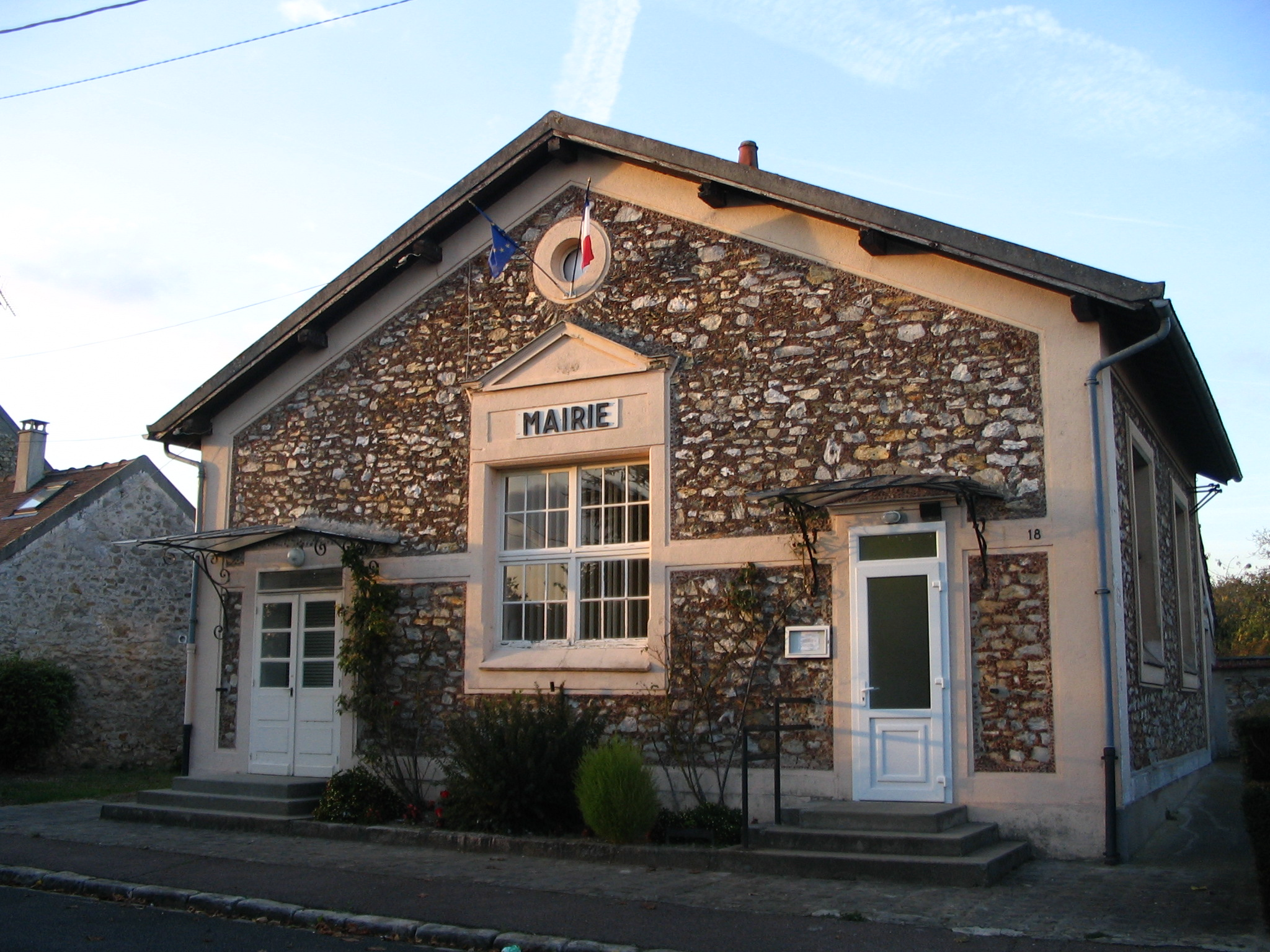
- Crisenoy's town hall (mairie) pictured in 2008
- Location of Crisenoy
- Location within France Location within Île-de-France (region)
- Coordinates: 48°35′47″N 2°44′40″E
- Country: France
- Region: Île-de-France
- Department: Seine-et-Marne
- Arrondissement: Melun
- Canton: Nangis
- Intercommunality: CC Brie des Rivières et Châteaux

Government
  - Mayor (2020–2026): Hervé Jeannin
- Area^{1}: 12.87 km^{2} (4.97 sq mi)
- Highest elevation: 98 m (322 ft)
- Lowest elevation: 85 m (279 ft)
- Population (2023): 611
  - Density: 47.5/km^{2} (123/sq mi)
- Demonym: Crisenoyens
- Time zone: UTC+01:00 (CET)
  - Summer (DST): UTC+02:00 (CEST)
- INSEE/Postal code: 77145 /77390
- Website: crisenoy.fr
- ^{1} French Land Register data, which excludes lakes, ponds, glaciers > 1 km^{2} (0.386 sq mi or 247 acres) and river estuaries.

Crisenoy (French pronunciation: [kʁiznwa]) is a commune in the Seine-et-Marne department in the Île-de-France region in north-central France.

== Demographics ==
Inhabitants of Crisenoy are called Crisenoyens.

== See also ==
- Communes of the Seine-et-Marne department
