= André Petitfils =

French footballer (1920–2001)

Personal information
- Full name: Andre Auguste Petitfils
- Date of birth: 10 February 1920
- Place of birth: Orléans, France
- Date of death: 3 October 2001 (aged 81)
- Place of death: Hyères, France
- Height: 1.69 m (5 ft 7 in)
- Positions: Forward; defensive midfielder

Senior career*
| Years | Team | Apps | (Gls) |
| 1938–1939 | Charleville | 9 | (2) |
| 1939–1951 | Stade de Reims | 167 | (32) |
| 1943–1944 | → ÉF Reims-Champagne | | |
| 1951–1952 | Toulouse | | |
| 1952–1954 | Canet Roussillon | 67 | (3) |
- * Club domestic league appearances and goals

Andre Auguste Petitfils (10 February 1920 – 3 October 2001) was a French footballer who played as a forward and defensive midfielder.

== Career ==
Petitfils scored the second goal in the 1950 Coupe de France final, in a 2–0 win against RC Paris.

== Honours ==
EF Reims-Champagne

- Coupe de France runners-up: 1943–44

Reims

- French Division 1: 1948–49; runners-up: 1946–47
- Coupe de France: 1949–50
