= Stanislas Dombeck =

French footballer (1931–2013)

Personal information
- Date of birth: 26 September 1931
- Place of birth: Crisenoy, France
- Date of death: 18 September 2013 (aged 81)
- Place of death: Sablonceaux, France
- Height: 1.68 m (5 ft 6 in)
- Positions: Midfielder; forward

Senior career*
Years	Team	Apps	(Gls)
1950–1951	Amiens	8	(0)
1951–1956	Stade Français	113	(26)
1956–1962	Rennes	155	(33)
Total		276	(59)

International career
1958	France	1	(0)

Managerial career
- 1964–1967: Tours
- * Club domestic league appearances and goals

Stanislas Dombeck (26 September 1931 – 18 September 2013) was a French footballer who played at both professional and international levels as a midfielder and forward.

== Career ==
Born in Crisenoy, Dombeck played professionally for Amiens, Stade Français and Rennes. After playing amateur football, he became manager of Tours.

He made one international appearance for France, in 1958.

== Later life and death ==
He died on 18 September 2013, at the age of 81.
