= Enzo Menegotti =

Italian footballer (1925–1999)

Personal information
- Date of birth: 13 July 1925
- Place of birth: Verona, Kingdom of Italy
- Date of death: 24 February 1999 (aged 73)
- Place of death: Bolzano, Italy
- Height: 1.70 m (5 ft 7 in)
- Position: Midfielder

Senior career*
Years	Team	Apps	(Gls)
1942–1944	Verona	7	(2)
1945–1946	Audace S. Michele Extra		
1946–1951	Modena	157	(9)
1951–1952	Milan	16	(0)
1952–1957	Udinese	155	(21)
1957–1959	Roma	47	(0)
1959–1961	Udinese	29	(2)

International career
1955	Italy	2	(0)
- * Club domestic league appearances and goals

Enzo Menegotti (Italian pronunciation: [ˈɛntso meneˈɡɔtti]; 13 July 1925 – 24 February 1999) was an Italian professional footballer who played as a midfielder.

== Club career ==
Menegotti played for 12 seasons (291 games, 22 goals) in the Italian Serie A for Modena F.C., A.C. Milan, Udinese Calcio and A.S. Roma.

== International career ==
Menegotti made his Italy national football team senior debut on March 30, 1955, in a game against West Germany, and made one more appearance for Italy later that year. He was the first player to represent Udinese on the national team. He was part of the Italian team that took part at the 1948 Summer Olympics.
