= Celestino Celio =

Italian footballer and manager (1925-2008)

Personal information
- Date of birth: 20 May 1925
- Place of birth: San Martino di Venezze, Italy
- Date of death: 26 January 2008 (aged 82)
- Place of death: Fossalta di Portogruaro, Italy
- Height: 1.73 m (5 ft 8 in)
- Position: Midfielder

Senior career*
Years	Team	Apps	(Gls)
1942–1944	Legnago		
1945–1946	Badia Polesine		
1946–1951	Padova	165	(20)
1951–1952	Genoa	34	(4)
1952–1953	Milan	26	(0)
1953–1955	Roma	52	(6)
1955–1956	Internazionale	16	(1)
1956–1957	Catania	22	(2)
1957–1958	Salernitana	15	(0)
1958–1962	Padova	96	(4)
1962–1964	Trento	21	(3)
1964–1965	Rovigo	1	(1)

International career
1954	Italy	1	(0)

Managerial career
- 1964–1965: Rovigo
- * Club domestic league appearances and goals

Celestino Celio (Italian pronunciation: [tʃeleˈstiːno ˈtʃɛːljo]; 20 May 1925 – 26 January 2008) was an Italian professional football player and manager who played as a midfielder.

His younger brother Gastone Celio also played football professionally. To distinguish them, Celestino was referred to as "Celio I" and Gastone as "Celio II."
