= 1949–50 Coupe de France =

Tournament details
- Country: France

Final positions
- Champions: Stade de Reims
- Runners-up: RC Paris

The 1949–1950 Coupe de France was the 33rd edition of the Coupe de France, the primary cup competition in France. It was won by Stade de Reims, who beat RC Paris 2–0 in the final.

== Round of 32 ==
Team 1	Score	Team 2
Le Havre (D2)	3–0	ES Bully-les-Mines (CFA)
AS Béziers (D2)	3–1	AS Française (?)
Cannes (D2)	1–0	Stade Français-Red Star (D1)
AS Monaco (D2)	5–0	FC Metz (D1)
Troyes-Savinienne (D2)	4–2	US Revel (CFA)
FC Sète (D1)	1–0	Arago Orléans (CFA)
Sochaux-Montbéliard (D1)	3–0	SC Bastidienne (LR)
Girondins de Bordeaux (D1)	5–0	CA Paris (D2)
CA Montreuil (CFA)	1–0	RC Vichy (CFA)
Lille (D1)	9–0	US Noeux-les-Mines (CFA)
Nîmes Olympique (D2)	3–1	FC Rouen (D2)
Racing Besançon (D2)	1–1 (a.e.t.)	Montpellier (D1)
RC Paris (D1)	2–0	Caen (CFA)
Stade de Reims (D1)	7–0	FC Saint-Gaudinois (CFA)
Stade Rennais (D1)	3–1	Nantes (D2)
Sedan-Torcy (DH)	3–2	Strasbourg (D1)
Replay
Racing Besançon (D2)	6–1	Montpellier (D1)

== Round of 16 ==
Team 1	Score	Team 2
Troyes-Savinienne (D2)	2–1	Stade Rennais (D1)
Sochaux-Montbéliard (D1)	2–0	Le Havre (D2)
Lille (D1)	6–0	AS Béziers (D2)
Nîmes Olympique (D2)	4–1	Girondins de Bordeaux (D1)
Racing Besançon (D2)	0–0 (a.e.t.)	AS Monaco (D2)
RC Paris (D1)	5–2	FC Sète (D1)
Stade de Reims (D1)	5–2	Cannes (D2)
Sedan-Torcy (DH)	5–3	CA Montreuil (CFA)
Replay
Racing Besançon (D2)	4–2	AS Monaco (D2)

== Quarter-finals ==
Team 1	Score	Team 2
Troyes-Savinienne (D2)	0–0 (a.e.t.)	Racing Besançon (D2)
Nîmes Olympique (D2)	4–3 (a.e.t.)	Sochaux-Montbéliard (D1)
RC Paris (D1)	3–2	Lille (D1)
Stade de Reims (D1)	2–0	Sedan-Torcy (DH)
Replay
Troyes-Savinienne (D2)	3–2 (a.e.t.)	Sedan-Torcy (DH)

== Semi-finals ==
16 April 1950

Stade de Reims (1)	6–2	Troyes-Savinienne (2)
Appel 3', 17', 27', 39', 87'; Méano 5'	Report	Dussautois 48'; Winkler 56'

16 April 1950

RC Paris (1)	3–0	Nîmes Olympique (2)
Vaast 7'; Guðmundsson 35'; Quenolle 88'	Report

== Final ==
14 May 1950

Reims	2–0	RC Paris
Méano 81'; Petitfils 83'

Stade Olympique Yves-du-Manoir, Colombes
Attendance: 61,722
Referee: Marius Veyret
