= Bernard Delcampe =

French footballer (1932-2013)

Personal information
- Date of birth: 12 September 1932
- Place of birth: Mohon (Ardennes), France
- Date of death: 8 January 2013 (aged 80)
- Height: 1.71 m (5 ft 7 in)
- Position: Forward

Senior career*
Years	Team	Apps	(Gls)
1948–1952	Stade de Reims		
1952–1956	AS Troyes-Savinienne		
- * Club domestic league appearances and goals

Bernard Delcampe (12 September 1932 – 8 January 2013) was a French footballer who played as a forward.

Starting his career at Stade de Reims, he joined AS Troyes-Savinienne in 1952. He was a finalist in the Coupe de France with the Troyens in 1956. He later coached Stade Poitevin from 1967 to 1975.

== Honours ==
- Coupe de France finalist 1956 with AS Troyes-Savinienne
