= Witry-lès-Reims =

- Commune
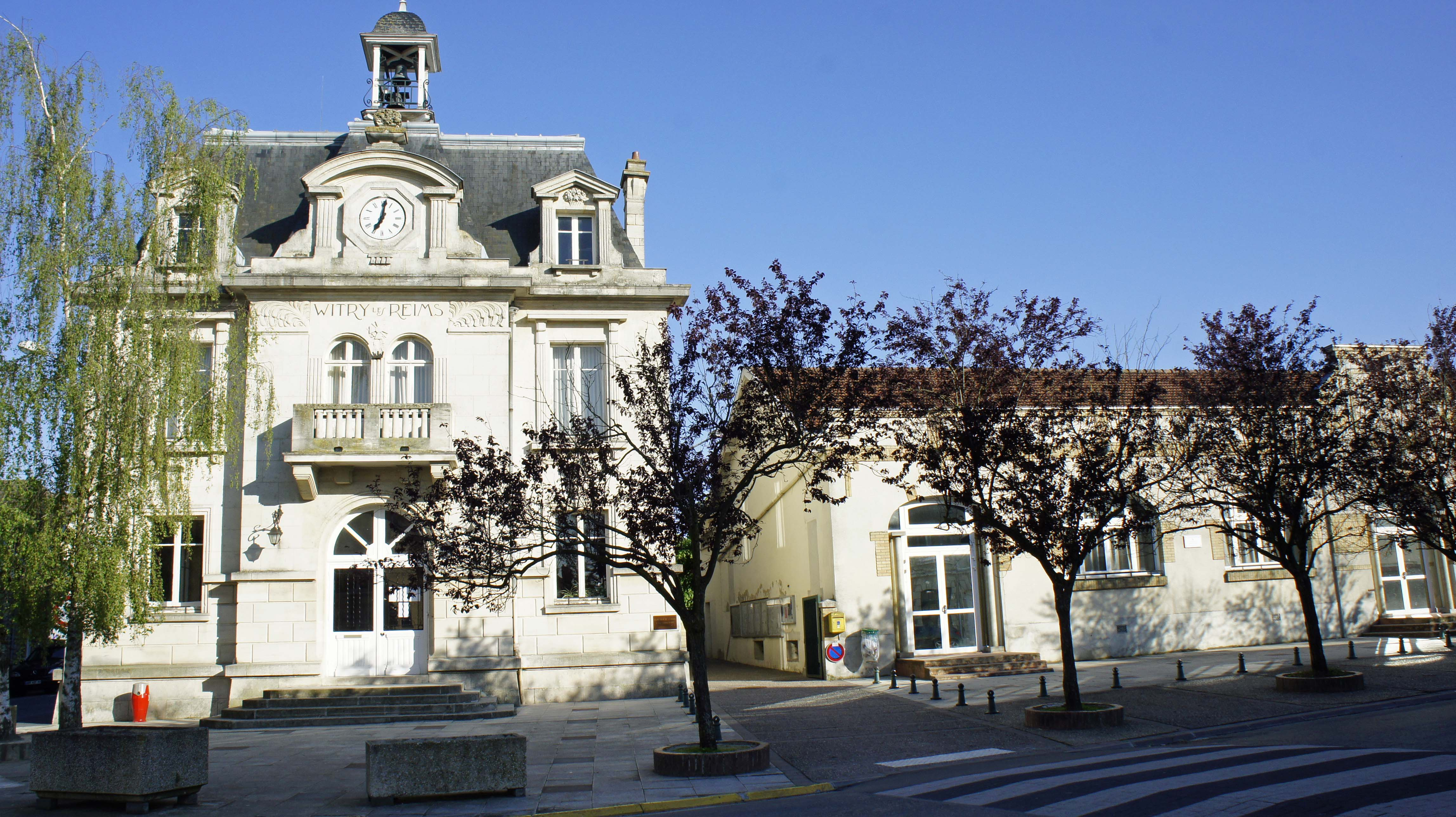
- The town hall in Witry-lès-Reims
- Location of Witry-lès-Reims
- Location within France Location within Grand Est
- Coordinates: 49°17′36″N 4°07′18″E
- Country: France
- Region: Grand Est
- Department: Marne
- Arrondissement: Reims
- Canton: Bourgogne-Fresne
- Intercommunality: Grand Reims

Government
  - Mayor (2020–2026): Michel Keller
- Area^{1}: 16.49 km^{2} (6.37 sq mi)
- Elevation: 119 m (390 ft)
- Population (2023): 4,950
  - Density: 300/km^{2} (777/sq mi)
- Time zone: UTC+01:00 (CET)
  - Summer (DST): UTC+02:00 (CEST)
- INSEE/Postal code: 51662 /51420
- ^{1} French Land Register data, which excludes lakes, ponds, glaciers > 1 km^{2} (0.386 sq mi or 247 acres) and river estuaries.

Witry-lès-Reims (French pronunciation: [vitʁi lɛ ʁɛ̃s], literally Witry near Reims) is a commune in the Marne department in north-eastern France.

== Population ==
Historical population
Year	Pop.	±% p.a.
1968	1,502	—
1975	1,782	+2.47%
1982	4,674	+14.77%
1990	4,572	−0.28%
1999	4,625	+0.13%
2007	4,673	+0.13%
2012	4,730	+0.24%
2017	5,020	+1.20%
2023	4,950	−0.23%
Source: INSEE

== See also ==
- Communes of the Marne department
