= Armand Penverne =

French footballer and manager (1926–2012)

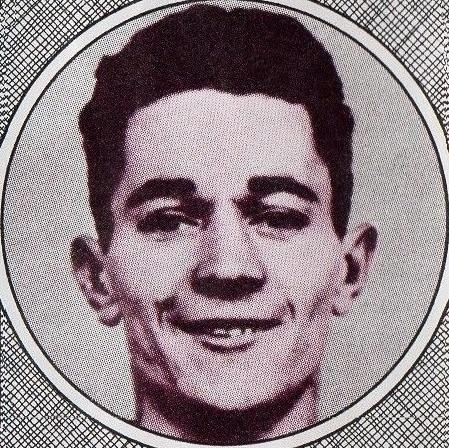
- Penverne in 1958

Personal information
- Full name: Armand Pierre Adolphe Penverne
- Date of birth: 26 November 1926
- Place of birth: Pont-Scorff, Morbihan, France
- Date of death: 27 February 2012 (aged 85)
- Place of death: Marseille, Bouches-du-Rhône, France
- Height: 1.72 m (5 ft 8 in)
- Position: Midfielder

Youth career
- Versailles

Senior career*
Years	Team	Apps	(Gls)
1947–1959	Reims	333	(33)
1959–1960	Red Star Saint-Ouen	36	(3)
1960–1962	Limoges Foot 87	61	(4)
Total		430	(40)

International career
1952–1959	France	39	(2)

Managerial career
- 1962: Marseille
- 1963–1964: ES La Ciotat
Medal record
Representing France
FIFA World Cup
Third place	1958
- * Club domestic league appearances and goals

Armand Pierre Adolphe Penverne (26 November 1926 – 27 February 2012) was a French professional footballer, who played as a midfielder, and coach. He played most of his professional career for Reims, winning four French championships and appearing in one European Cup final. He made 39 appearances for the France national team, scoring twice. After retiring as a player, Penverne served as coach of Marseille from July to December 1962 before becoming the technical director of the local club La Ciotat during the 1963–64 season. On 27 February 2012, he died at the age of 85.

== Honours ==
Reims

- Division 1: 1948–49, 1952–53, 1954–55, 1957–58
- Coupe de France: 1949–50, 1957–58
- Trophée des Champions: 1955, 1958
- Latin Cup: 1953
