= Montegrosso =

- Commune
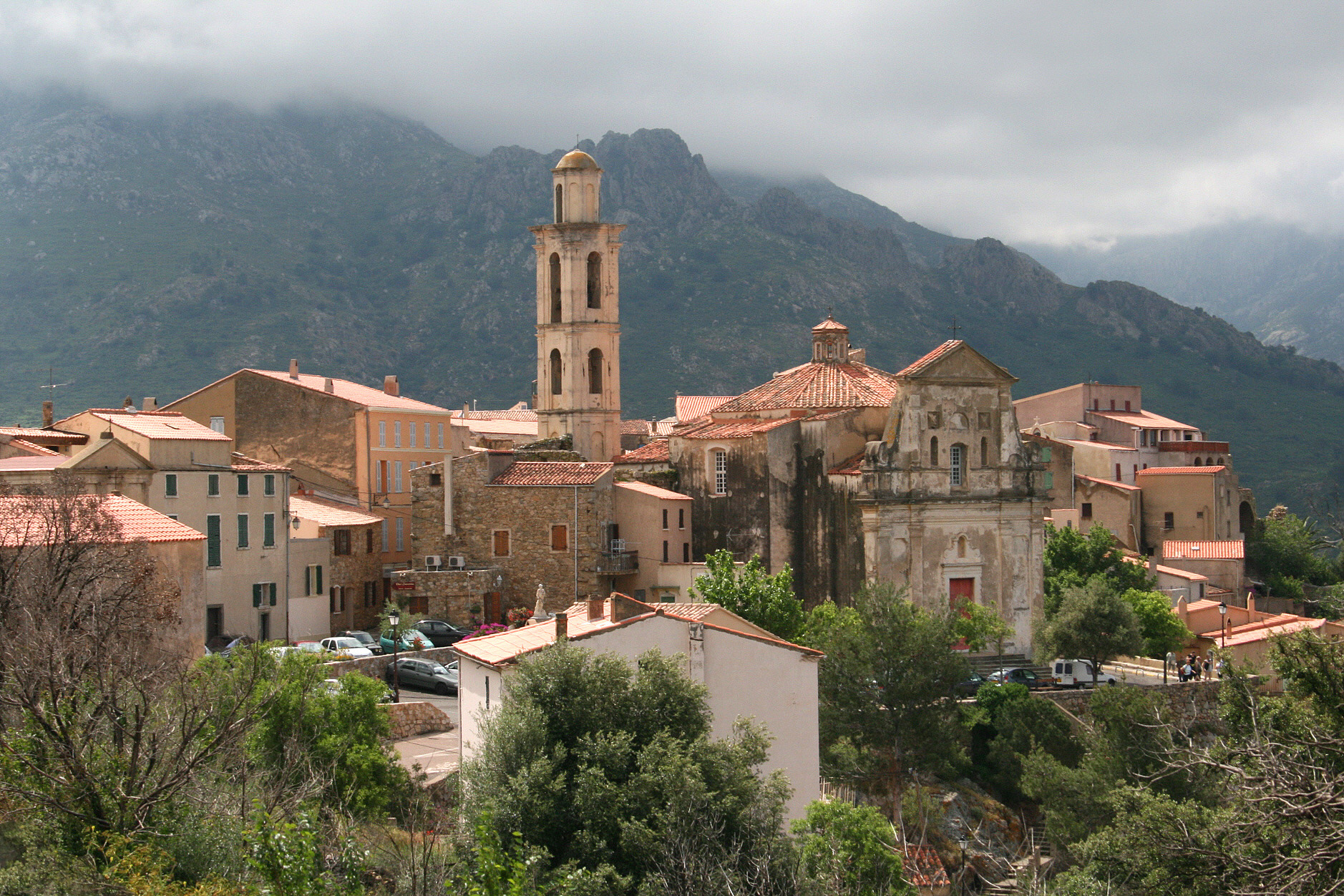
- Montemaggiore
- Location of Montegrosso
- Location within France Location within Corsica
- Coordinates: 42°32′36″N 8°53′11″E
- Country: France
- Region: Corsica
- Department: Haute-Corse
- Arrondissement: Calvi
- Canton: Calvi
- Intercommunality: Calvi Balagne

Government
  - Mayor (2020–2026): Jean-Marc Borri
- Area^{1}: 22.78 km^{2} (8.80 sq mi)
- Elevation: 400 m (1,300 ft)
- Highest elevation: 800 m (2,600 ft)
- Lowest elevation: 20 m (66 ft)
- Population (2023): 413
  - Density: 18.1/km^{2} (47.0/sq mi)
- Time zone: UTC+01:00 (CET)
  - Summer (DST): UTC+02:00 (CEST)
- INSEE/Postal code: 2B167 /20214
- ^{1} French Land Register data, which excludes lakes, ponds, glaciers > 1 km^{2} (0.386 sq mi or 247 acres) and river estuaries.

Montegrosso (French pronunciation: [mɔ̃tɛɡʁɔso]) is a commune in the Haute-Corse department of France on the island of Corsica. It is a gathering of three villages: Montemaggiore, Lunghiniano and Zillia.

Montegrosso is named after the surrounding mountain, Montegrosso (the "Big Mountain"), and located 10 miles from Calvi.

== Population ==
Historical population
Year	Pop.	±% p.a.
1968	337	—
1975	223	−5.73%
1982	319	+5.25%
1990	333	+0.54%
1999	354	+0.68%
2007	414	+1.98%
2012	453	+1.82%
2017	426	−1.22%
2023	413	−0.52%
Source: INSEE

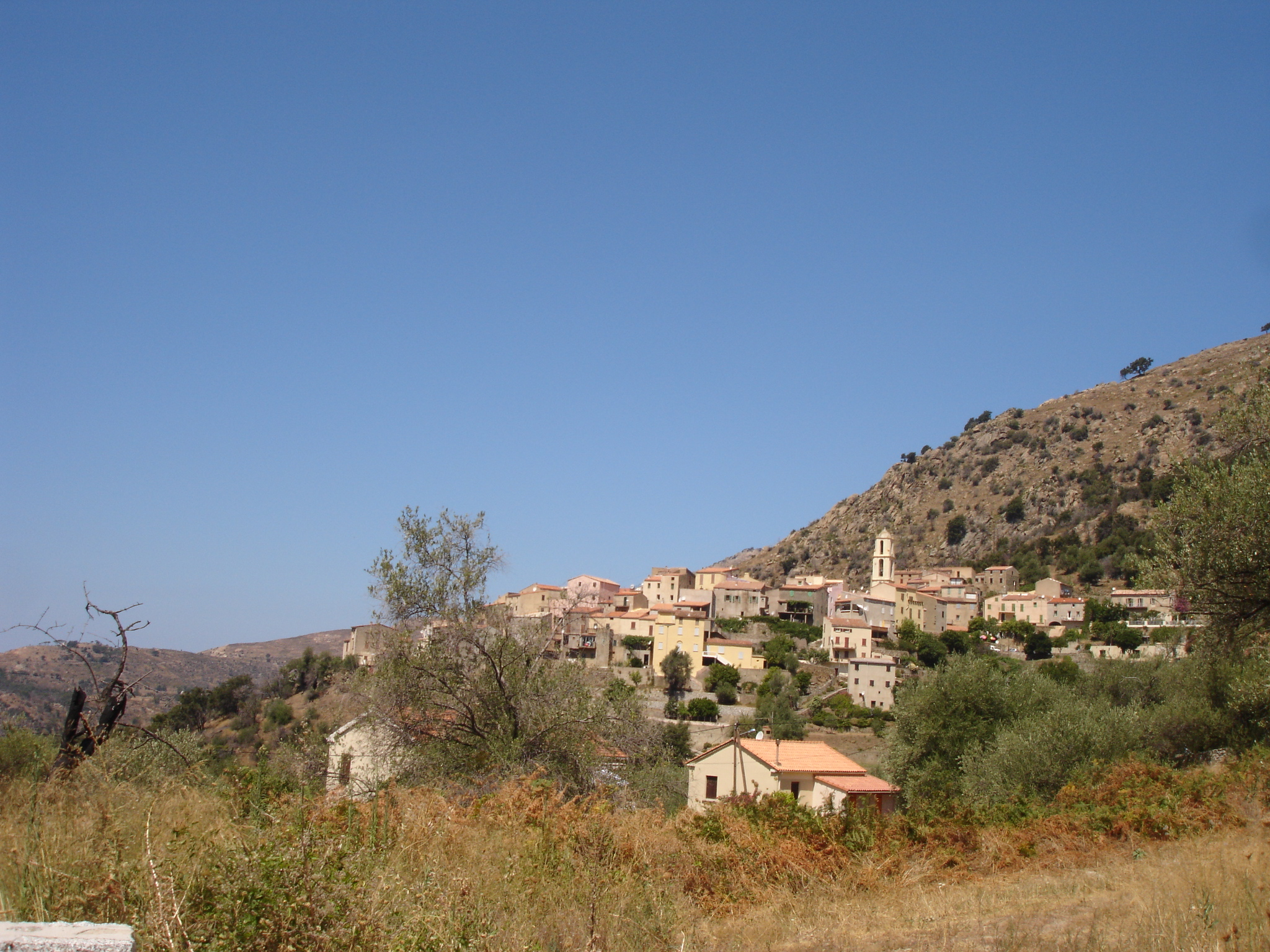
The village

== See also ==
- Communes of the Haute-Corse department
