= Amleto Frignani =

Italian footballer (1932-1997)

Personal information
- Date of birth: 5 March 1932
- Place of birth: Carpi, Kingdom of Italy
- Date of death: 2 March 1997 (aged 64)
- Place of death: Fresno, California, U.S.
- Height: 1.74 m (5 ft 9 in)
- Position: Striker

Senior career*
Years	Team	Apps	(Gls)
1949–1950	Carpi		
1950–1951	Reggiana	34	(7)
1951–1956	Milan	134	(26)
1956–1957	Udinese	33	(5)
1957–1962	Genoa	109	(10)

International career
1952–1957	Italy	14	(6)
- * Club domestic league appearances and goals

Amleto Frignani (Italian pronunciation: [amˈlɛːto friɲˈɲaːni]; 5 March 1932 – 2 March 1997) was an Italian footballer who played as a striker.

== Club career ==
Frignani played 9 seasons (248 games, 40 goals) in the Italian Serie A for A.C. Milan, Udinese Calcio and Genoa C.F.C.

== International career ==
At international level, Frignani earned 14 caps and scored 6 goals for the Italy national team between 1952 and 1957, and participated in the 1954 FIFA World Cup.

== Honours ==
Milan

- Serie A: 1954–55
- Latin Cup: 1956
