= Simon Zimny =

French footballer (1927–2007)

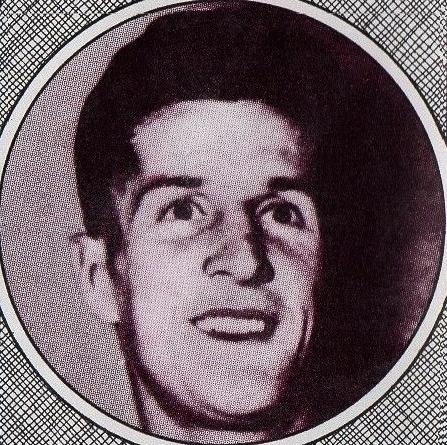

Personal information
- Date of birth: 18 May 1927
- Place of birth: Divion, France
- Date of death: 3 April 2007 (aged 79)
- Place of death: Épernay, France
- Position: Defender

Senior career*
Years	Team	Apps	(Gls)
–1949	Nœux-les-Mines		
1949–1958	Reims		
1958–1960	Stade Français		

International career
1955	France	1	(0)

Managerial career
- 1960–1961: RC Vichy
- * Club domestic league appearances and goals

Simon Zimny (18 May 1927 – 3 April 2007) was a French professional footballer who played as a defender.

== Personal life ==
Zimny was born in France, and was of Polish descent.
