= Paul Sinibaldi =

French footballer (1921–2018)

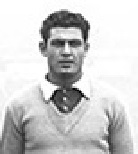
- Sinibaldi in 1948

Personal information
- Date of birth: 3 December 1921
- Place of birth: Montemaggiore, France
- Date of death: 2 April 2018 (aged 96)
- Place of death: Marseille, France
- Height: 1.75 m (5 ft 9 in)
- Position: Goalkeeper

Senior career*
Years	Team	Apps	(Gls)
1945–1946	Toulouse	0	(0)
1946–1947	Nîmes	40	(0)
1947–1948	Olympique Alès	32	(0)
1948–1956	Reims	236	(0)
1956–1957	Stade Français	31	(0)
Total		339	(0)

International career
1950	France	1	(0)
- * Club domestic league appearances and goals

Paul Sinibaldi (3 December 1921 – 2 April 2018) was a French professional footballer who played as a goalkeeper.

== Early and personal life ==
Born in Montemaggiore, Corsica, Sinibaldi's two brothers Pierre and Noël were also footballers.

Sinibaldi was a mentor to Raymond Kopa and was godfather to his son.

== Career ==
Sinibaldi played club football for Toulouse, Nîmes, Olympique Alès, Reims and Stade Français. With Reims he won the championship three times and the Coupe de France once.

He earned one international cap for France in 1950. At the time of his death he was the oldest living former French international.

== Later life and death ==
He died in Marseille on 2 April 2018, at the age of 96.
