= Bram Appel =

Dutch football player and manager (1921–1997)

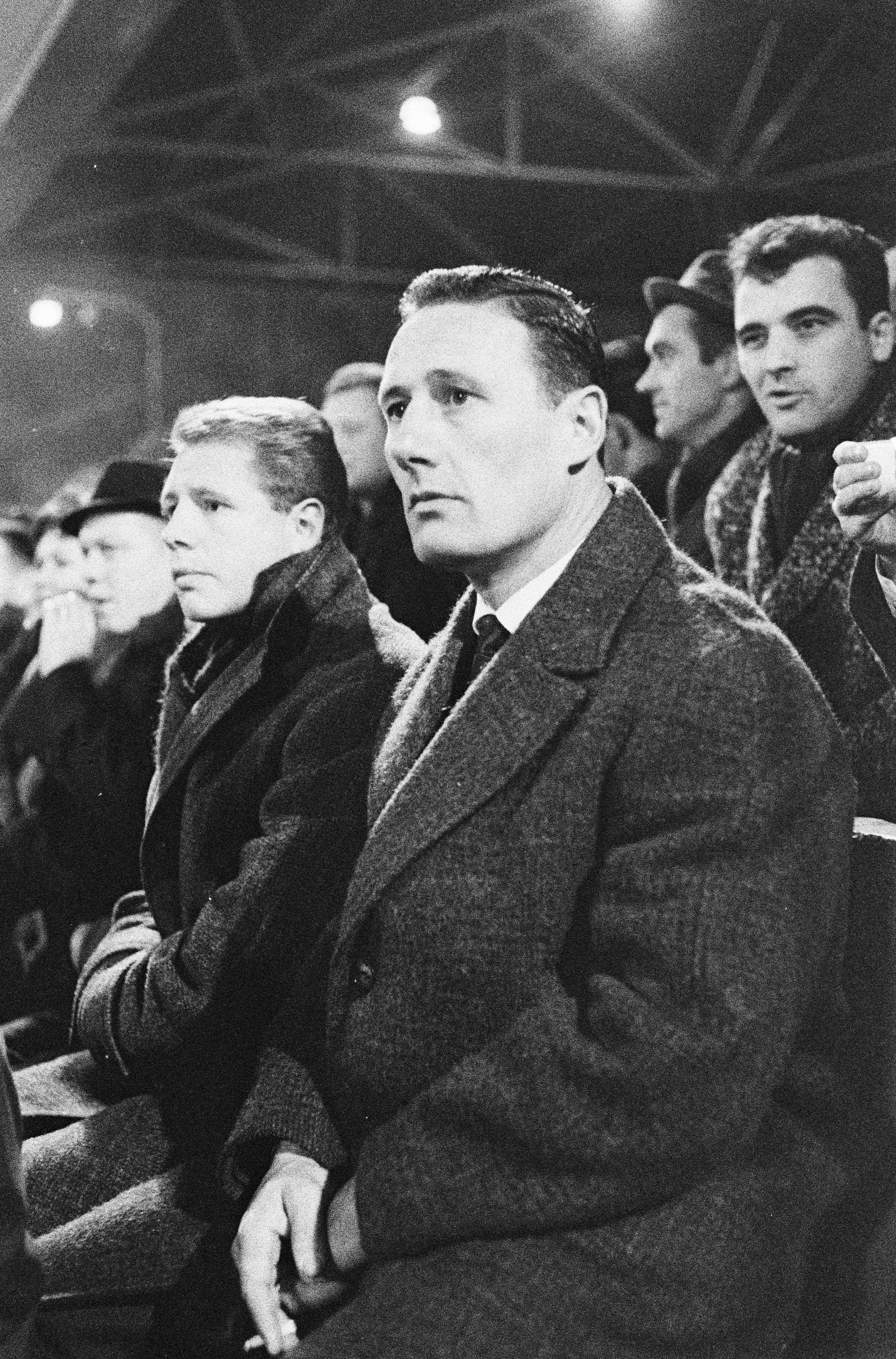
- Appel in 1963

Personal information
- Full name: Abraham Leonardus Appel
- Date of birth: 30 November 1921
- Place of birth: Rotterdam, Netherlands
- Date of death: 31 October 1997 (aged 75)
- Place of death: Geleen, Netherlands
- Position: Striker

Youth career
- Blauw Zwart
- SVT
- 1940–1942: Archipel

Senior career*
Years	Team	Apps	(Gls)
1942–1944	Hertha BSC		
1945–1947	ADO Den Haag		
1948–1949	Sittard		
1949–1954	Reims	154	(96)
1954–1955	Lausanne Sports	22	(15)
1955–1960	Fortuna '54	109	(57)

International career
1948–1957	Netherlands	12	(10)

Managerial career
- 1954–1955: FC Lausanne-Sport
- 1955–1960: Fortuna '54
- 1960–1962: FC Volendam
- 1962–1967: PSV Eindhoven
- 1967–1968: Fortuna '54
- 1968–1970: Beringen
- * Club domestic league appearances and goals

Abraham Leonardus Appel (30 November 1921 – 31 October 1997) was a Dutch footballer who played as a striker and later a manager.

== Playing career ==
=== Club ===
Born in Rotterdam but raised in The Hague, Appel played for local clubs Archipel and Blauw Zwart in the Dutch amateur leagues in the 1930s. He was forced to work in a factory in Berlin, Germany in 1942. The factory where he worked was bombed a year later, and Appel narrowly survived.

During the war, Appel played for Hertha BSC and for an unofficial Dutch national team, made up of Dutch forced labourers. His refusal to give the Hitler salute before matches made the German authorities furious.

The Royal Dutch Football Association suspended Appel after the liberation in 1945. He was, however, a member of the Netherlands national football team at the 1948 Summer Olympics. He left for France in 1949, and became an important player for Stade de Reims where he played alongside Raymond Kopa and Roger Marche. Domestically he won the Coupe de France in 1950 and the French national title in 1953. Thanks to the victory of the French championship, Stade de Reims were allowed to participate in the fifth edition of the Latin Cup, eventually resulting in the team's first ever major European trophy win, obtained after beating AC Milan 3–0 in the final, with Appel scoring the second goal. Appel scored 96 goals in 154 matches for Stade Reims.

Appel and Theo Timmermans took the initiative for a charity match for the victims of the North Sea flood of 1953, between France and Dutch footballers playing abroad. The Dutch players won the match 2–1. The match was not an official international, because the Dutch players had been suspended from the Dutch national team. The Royal Dutch Football Association did not allow football players to be professionals. This match, however, paved the way for the acceptance of professional football in the Netherlands. Two years later, the ban on professionalism was lifted.

Appel returned to the Netherlands in 1954, having been signed by Fortuna '54 as one of the first professional football players in the Dutch league.

=== International ===
Appel made his official debut for the Netherlands in a July 1948 Olympic Games match against Great Britain in which he immediately scored 2 goals. He earned a total of 12 caps, scoring 10 goals.

His final international was an April 1957 friendly match against West Germany.

== Managerial career ==
Appel became a manager in 1960, and won the 1962–63 Eredivisie title as manager of PSV Eindhoven.
