= 1952–53 French Division 1 =

15th season of French Division 1

Division Nationale
- Season: 1952–53

Stade de Reims won Division 1 season 1952/1953 of the French Association Football League with 48 points.

== Participating teams ==
- Bordeaux
- Le Havre AC
- RC Lens
- Lille OSC
- Olympique de Marseille
- FC Metz
- SO Montpellier
- FC Nancy
- OGC Nice
- Nîmes Olympique
- RC Paris
- Stade de Reims
- Stade Rennais UC
- CO Roubaix-Tourcoing
- AS Saint-Etienne
- FC Sète
- FC Sochaux-Montbéliard
- Stade français (football)
Location of teams in 1952–53 Division 1

== Final table ==
Pos	Team	Pld	W	D	L	GF	GA	GAv	Pts	Qualification or relegation
1	Reims (C)	34	22	4	8	86	36	2.389	48	
2	Sochaux	34	18	8	8	72	58	1.241	44	
3	Bordeaux	34	19	5	10	79	56	1.411	43	
4	Lille	34	15	10	9	61	43	1.419	40	
5	Nîmes	34	17	6	11	62	47	1.319	40	
6	Marseille	34	15	7	12	62	53	1.170	37	
7	Lens	34	13	8	13	50	48	1.042	34	
8	Nancy	34	16	2	16	48	58	0.828	34	
9	Stade Français	34	12	9	13	54	51	1.059	33	
10	Sète	34	13	7	14	42	49	0.857	33	
11	Saint-Étienne	34	11	8	15	44	59	0.746	30	
12	Metz	34	11	7	16	44	48	0.917	29	
13	Nice	34	12	5	17	49	57	0.860	29	
14	Le Havre	34	11	7	16	47	63	0.746	29	
15	Roubaix-Tourcoing	34	9	10	15	42	49	0.857	28	
16	Rennes (R)	34	10	8	16	37	56	0.661	28	Qualification to relegation play-offs
17	Racing Paris (R)	34	11	6	17	40	64	0.625	28	Relegation to French Division 2
18	Montpellier (R)	34	8	9	17	43	67	0.642	25	Relegation to French Division 2

Rules for classification: Victory: 2 points, Draw: 1 point, Defeat: 0 points
(C) Champions; (R) Relegated

Promoted from Division 2, who will play in Division 1 season 1953/1954

- Toulouse FC: Champion of Division 2
- AS Monaco: Runner-up
- RC Strasbourg: Third place

== Results ==
Home \ Away	BOR	LHA	RCL	LIL	OM	MET	SOM	FCN	NIC	NMS	RCP	REI	REN	CRT	STE	SÉT	SOC	SFF
Bordeaux		6–0	2–0	1–5	2–0	4–0	6–0	4–1	7–3	3–2	3–1	1–0	7–0	4–2	0–0	3–0	4–1	2–1
Le Havre	3–1		1–0	0–1	2–1	3–0	1–1	0–1	2–0	1–1	4–1	3–4	1–1	2–0	3–0	2–0	2–2	1–3
Lens	1–1	2–0		0–3	1–1	3–1	2–1	4–1	2–0	2–1	2–1	1–3	5–0	1–3	1–2	3–0	5–1	1–1
Lille	0–0	3–1	0–0		2–0	1–2	2–2	6–2	1–1	3–2	3–0	2–5	1–1	2–1	0–2	5–0	3–1	2–1
Marseille	3–0	3–1	1–1	3–0		3–0	5–1	4–3	3–1	4–1	3–0	2–1	2–2	4–2	1–0	3–3	1–6	1–0
Metz	0–2	6–1	3–0	0–3	1–3		1–1	2–0	2–0	2–0	0–2	0–0	2–1	1–1	5–0	0–1	1–2	2–0
Montpellier	4–1	2–1	2–1	1–1	2–1	1–1		0–1	2–1	2–5	0–1	2–6	2–2	1–1	2–0	1–1	2–3	0–3
Nancy	3–0	0–3	1–3	1–3	1–0	1–0	3–0		2–1	2–0	1–0	1–1	1–2	1–0	3–2	0–1	1–2	5–1
Nice	1–2	0–2	3–1	0–0	3–1	1–2	0–0	2–1		2–0	1–2	0–4	3–1	4–1	2–0	3–2	5–3	2–1
Nîmes	5–1	7–1	0–0	2–0	2–0	2–1	4–2	2–1	1–0		4–2	1–0	2–0	1–0	0–0	3–1	2–0	0–0
Racing Paris	3–3	1–1	1–1	1–0	1–1	0–2	2–1	1–2	1–3	1–2		1–3	2–0	0–2	2–1	2–1	2–1	2–2
Reims	2–3	5–0	5–0	1–1	3–1	2–1	3–2	0–2	3–1	2–0	5–1		5–1	1–0	2–0	2–0	3–0	1–2
Rennes	1–0	2–0	3–2	1–1	3–1	4–2	0–1	0–1	0–0	2–0	1–0	0–1		3–2	0–1	3–0	1–1	0–0
Roubaix-Tourcoing	3–1	0–0	0–1	1–2	0–0	1–0	1–0	2–2	2–2	2–4	0–1	1–1	3–2		2–0	2–0	2–2	0–0
Saint-Étienne	1–1	1–0	2–3	2–1	2–2	2–2	2–0	6–0	2–1	4–2	3–1	2–6	1–0	1–1		2–2	1–3	1–1
Sète	2–0	3–1	2–0	3–1	2–0	0–0	1–0	1–2	1–0	1–1	0–1	2–1	2–0	1–0	5–0		0–0	2–2
Sochaux	8–2	3–2	1–0	3–3	2–1	1–1	2–1	1–0	3–2	1–1	3–3	1–0	2–0	3–1	3–0	4–2		1–3
Stade Français	0–2	2–2	1–1	2–0	2–3	2–1	2–4	4–1	0–1	4–2	5–0	1–5	2–0	1–3	2–1	2–0	1–2	

Legend: Blue = home team win; Yellow = draw; Red = away team win.

== Relegation play-offs ==
Team 1	Agg.	Team 2	1st leg	2nd leg
Strasbourg	7–1	Rennes	4–0	3–1

== Top goalscorers ==
Rank	Player	Club	Goals
1	(Sweden) Gunnar Andersson	Marseille	35
2	(Netherlands) Bram Appel	Reims	30
3	(France) Abdesselem Ben Mohamed	Bordeaux	22
4	(France) Jean Saunier	Le Havre	19
5	(France) (Poland) Édouard Kargu	Bordeaux	18
6	(France) Georges Dupraz	Montpellier	17
6	(France) René Gardien	Sochaux	17
6	(Argentina) Alberto Muro	Sochaux	17
9	(France) Rachid Belaïd	Nancy	16
10	(Sweden) Egon Jonsson	Stade Français	14
10	(France) Henri Fontaine	Sète	14

== Attendances ==
#	Club	Average
1	Racing	20,695
2	Marseille	17,569
3	Stade français	17,367
4	Girondins	15,167
5	Nice	13,344
6	LOSC	13,334
7	Lens	12,112
8	Reims	9,968
9	Nîmes	9,662
10	Saint-Étienne	9,502
11	Le Havre	9,413
12	Stade rennais	9,235
13	Roubaix-Tourcoing	8,171
14	MHSC	8,045
15	Nancy	7,861
16	Metz	7,560
17	Sochaux	7,367
18	Sète	5,385
