= Roger Marche =

French footballer (1924–1997)

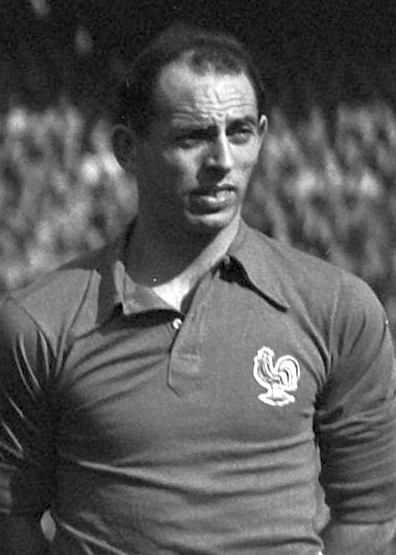
- Marche with France in 1949

Personal information
- Full name: Roger Gaston Louis Marche
- Date of birth: 5 March 1924
- Place of birth: Villers-Semeuse, France
- Date of death: 1 November 1997 (aged 73)
- Place of death: Charleville-Mézières, France
- Height: 1.72 m (5 ft 8 in)
- Position: Left back

Youth career
- ASC Mohon

Senior career*
Years	Team	Apps	(Gls)
1944–1954	Reims	300	(1)
1954–1962	RC Paris	242	(0)
Total		542	(1)

International career
1947–1959	France	63	(1)
Medal record
Representing France
FIFA World Cup
Third place	1958
- * Club domestic league appearances and goals

Roger Gaston Louis Marche (5 March 1924 – 1 November 1997) was a French footballer who played as a defender. He was part of the France national team during the 1954 and 1958 World Cup tournaments. He was nicknamed Le Sanglier des Ardennes ("the Boar of the Ardenne") for the region from which he came.

== Career ==
Marche, born in Villers-Semeuse, Ardennes, is one of the players with the most appearances in the French top division, having played 542 matches for the clubs Stade Reims and RC Paris.

He was a member of the France national team from 1947 to 1959, and became the most-capped player ever for France with 63 international matches played, surpassing Étienne Mattler's previous record of 46 caps set in 1940. Marche held the record until 1983, when the also defender Marius Trésor established a new mark with his 64th cap. Several players since have surpassed that cap total. He was also the nation's oldest goalscorer at 35 years and 287 days, until Olivier Giroud surpassed his record on 22 September 2022.

Marche died in 1997 in Charleville-Mézières.

== Honours ==
Reims

- Division 1: 1948–49, 1952–53; runner-up: 1946–47, 1953–54
- Coupe de France: 1949–50
- Trophée des Champions: 1949
- Latin Cup: 1953

France

- FIFA World Cup third place: 1958
