= France at the 1958 FIFA World Cup =

France national football team at the 1958 FIFA World Cup

The 1958 FIFA World Cup was the fifth FIFA World Cup that France competed at. At the previous FIFA World Cup, France had been eliminated in the group stage after finishing third in their group, behind Brazil and Yugoslavia.

According to France manager Albert Batteux, France's run into the tournament began with a 2–1 friendly win against Spain in March 1955, their first win against them since 1933. During qualification, they were drawn in a group with Belgium and Iceland, where they recorded an 8–0 win against Iceland, their largest until beating Azerbaijan 10–0 in 1995. They officially qualifed for the tournament on 27 October 1957, after a 0–0 draw against Belgium in Brussels.

At the tournament, France were drawn in Group 2, alongside Paraguay, Yugoslavia, and Scotland. They started the tournament with a 7–3 win against Paraguay, their largest win ever at a FIFA World Cup and the fifth highest-scoring match in the tournament's history. Their next match saw them lose 3–2 to Yugoslavia, before beating Scotland 2–1 in Örebro. In the quarter-finals, they were drawn against Northern Ireland, who they beat 4–0, before being beaten 5–2 by Brazil in the semi-finals. In the third place match, they beat rivals West Germany 6–3, to record their highest FIFA World Cup finish until their win in 1998.

== March 1955: Spain v France ==
On 17 March 1955, France faced Spain in a friendly match at the Estadio Santiago Bernabeu. France national team manager Albert Batteux, who made his managerial debut for France in the match, would later claim that their run into the 1958 FIFA World Cup began with this match.

Prior to the match, both sides had faced each other eight times, with France's only win coming in April 1933, while their most recent match had seen France lose 5–1 at home. However, this was Spain's first match since being eliminated from 1954 FIFA World Cup qualification by Turkey exactly a year prior, while a few months prior, France had beaten 1954 FIFA World Cup winners West Germany 3–1 at the Niedersachsenstadion in Hannover.

The morning of the match, French journalist Gabriel Hanot wrote in L'Équipe that "a four-goal defeat would be normal; one goal, an achievement; a draw a miracle; and a victory is impossible", with Batteux using Hanot's words to motivate his players in his pre-match talk.

=== Summary ===
Spain took the lead in the 11th minute, after a low cross from winger Estanislao Basora was converted by Agustín Gaínza. After about 20 minutes, Batteux asked Raymond Kopa, who was playing as a right winger, to switch positions with Bliard, who was at striker. Sevilla manager Helenio Herrera, who was at the match as a press consultant, called this decision the "key to the match". In the 35th minute, Armand Penverne passed the ball to Abderrahmane Mahjoub, setting up the equalizer for Kopa. Kopa scored again a few minutes later, thanks to a cross from Jean Vincent, but referee Vincenzo Orlandini disallowed the goal after his assistant incorrectly ruled it offside.

France continued to dominate the match going into the second half. With roughly twenty minutes left, Kopa got through the Spanish defense and passed the ball to Léon Glovacki, who then crossed the ball to Vincent, who scored France's second goal in the 73rd minute. Near the end of the match, Mahjoub was brought down by a defender in the box, but no penalty was given.

This match also marked the first time that France beat Spain away from home.

=== Details ===
17 March 1955

Spain	1–2	France
Gaínza 11'	Report	Kopa 35'; Vincent 73'

Estadio Santiago Bernabéu, Madrid, Spain
Attendance: 125,000
Referee: Vincenzo Orlandini (Italy)

GK	Antoni Ramallets
DF	Joan Segarra
DF	Rafael Lesmes
DF	Miguel Muñoz
MF	Marquitos
MF	Andreu Bosch
RW	Estanislau Basora
IF	Héctor Rial
CF	Eneko Arieta
IF	Luis Molowny	(substituted off) 43'
LW	Agustín Gaínza (c)
Substitutions:
FW	José Luis Artetxe	(substituted on) 43'
Manager:
Ramón Melcón

GK	François Remetter
DF	Guillaume Bieganski
DF	Roger Marche (c)
DF	Armand Penverne
MF	Robert Jonquet
MF	Xercès Louis
RW	Raymond Kopa
IF	Léon Glovacki
CF	René Bliard
IF	Abderrahmane Mahjoub
LW	Jean Vincent
Manager:
Albert Batteux

=== Aftermath ===
Following his performance, Kopa was dubbed "the Napoleon of football" by Daily Express journalist Desmond Hackett, while Spanish newspaper Marca gave him the nickname "Pequeño Napoleon" (Little Napoleon). Additionally, he caught the attention of Real Madrid president Santiago Bernabéu, who had been in attendance for the match and declared Kopa a transfer target for the club. Kopa eventually signed for Madrid shortly before the 1956 European Cup final, for a transfer fee of 52 million francs (roughly £38,000).

== 1958 FIFA World Cup qualification ==
Pos	Team	Pld	W	D	L	GF	GA	GR	Pts	Qualification	France national football team	Belgium national football team	Iceland national football team
1	France	4	3	1	0	19	4	4.750	7	Qualification to 1958 FIFA World Cup	—	6–3	8–0
2	Belgium	4	2	1	1	16	11	1.455	5		0–0	—	8–3
3	Iceland	4	0	0	4	6	26	0.231	0		1–5	2–5	—

Source: FIFA

=== France v Belgium ===
Despite an attendance of 46,000 people, it was considered low when compared to friendlies hosted against Hungary and the Soviet Union the month prior.

France dominated during the first half of the match, going 4–1 up by half-time. However, the match's momentum changed at the start of the second half, with Belgium taking control resulting in Belgian forward Maurice Willems getting a brace to make it 4–3. However, before Belgium could score an equalizing goal, France regained their earlier form, with Thadée Cisowski scoring twice late in the match to make it 6–3. Overall, Cisowski scored five goals, equaling the record set by Eugène Maës against Luxembourg in April 1913.

Shortly after the game concluded, a 45-minute cut of the match was aired on television in France, with its success leading to the first live-televised football match in the country, being Stade de Reims's 2–1 win against FC Metz on 29 December 1956. The day after, L'Équipe journalist Jacques de Ryswick wrote that the victory "mark[ed] a step forward in the progress of French football."

==== Details ====
11 November 1956

France	6–3	Belgium
Cisowski 13', 15', 44', 72', 88'; Vincent 18'	Report	Houf 16'; Willems 61', 67'

Stade Olympique de Colombes, Paris
Attendance: 46,049
Referee: Jack Clough (England)

=== France v Iceland ===
This match marked the first time both countries ever faced each other. Due to fears over a lack of interest in the match from the Parisian public, the French Football Federation decided to have it played at the Stade Malakoff, home of French Division 2 side Nantes, marking the first time France hosted a FIFA World Cup qualification match outside of Paris.

France took the lead after six minutes, after Helgi Daníelsson saved a shot from Raymond Kaelbel but failed to prevent the deflection to Célestin Oliver. Five minutes later, Oliver doubled the lead after scoring from a cross by Toulouse forward Said Brahimi, who was making his international debut. In the 29th minute, Daníelsson deflected a shot by Brahimi, which landed to Jean Vincent, who scored France's third goal. Six minutes later, René Dereuddre capitalized on a rebound from Oliver's shot to make it 4–0, and shortly before half-time, France made it 5–0 when Roger Piantoni scored from 18 meters out.

Early into the second half, France increased their lead again, after Brahimi scored from a cross by Oliver. Their seventh goal wouldn't come until the final 10 minutes, when Piantoni finished off a one-two with Dereuddre, and two minutes later, Vincent scored to make it 8–0. At the time, this was tied for France's largest ever win, alongside two other 8–0 wins against Luxembourg in 1913 and 1953, which were all later beaten by a 10–0 win against Azerbaijan in 1995.

==== Details ====
2 June 1957

France	8–0	Iceland
C. Oliver 6', 11'; Vincent 29', 83'; Dereuddre 36'; Piantoni 45', 81'; Brahimi 49'	Report

Stade Malakoff, Nantes
Attendance: 15,080
Referee: Arthur Edward Ellis (England)

=== Iceland v France ===
France's first goal came in the 29th minute by Cisowski, who capitalized on a defensive mix-up to score. He scored again three minutes later, after taking advantage of a poor clearance by Icelandic goalkeeper Helgi Daníelsson. In the 36th minute, Iceland were awarded a penalty after Raymond Kaelbel obstructed Þórður Þórðarson, which was saved by Dominique Colonna a minute later.

During the second half, Joseph Ujlaki made it 3–0, after scoring a header from a cross by Roger Piantoni. A few minutes later, Maryan Wisniewski shot from 20 meters out and beat Daníelsson to make it 4–0. Þórður Jónsson scored for Iceland in the 64th minute to make it 4–1, before Ujlaki scored two minutes later from a difficult position, assisted by Wisnieski.

==== Details ====
1 September 1957

Iceland	1–5	France
Þ. Jónsson 64'	Report	Cisowski 29', 32'; Ujlaki 48', 66'; Wisnieski 53'

Laugardalsvöllur, Reykjavík
Attendance: 9,000
Referee: Bobby Davidson (Scotland)

=== Belgium v France ===
Despite Belgium dominating most of the match and nearly scoring two goals, a 0–0 draw was enough for France to qualify for the 1958 FIFA World Cup.

==== Details ====
27 October 1957

Belgium	0–0	France
	Report

Heysel Stadium, Brussels
Attendance: 56,497
Referee: Leo Helge (Denmark)

== 1958 FIFA World Cup ==
=== Squad ===
Albert Batteux was the manager of France at the tournament, with Jean Snella serving as his assistant manager.

In April 1958, France lost several players to the newly-formed FLN football team, including French internationals Mustapha Zitouni, Saïd Brahimi, and Rachid Mekhloufi. Additionally, there were two notable absentees from the squad, including RC Paris forward Thadée Cisowski, who missed the tournament due to an injury and was replaced by Just Fontaine, and Reims winger René Bliard, who was initially called up for the tournament, but was ruled out following an ankle injury during a pre-tournament warmup match in Kopparberg. On the opposite side, this was Raymond Kopa's first international call-up since joining Real Madrid in the summer of 1956.

The last member of the squad to pass away was Robert Mouynet on 18 August 2026, at the age of 96.

No.	Pos.	Player	Date of birth (age)	Caps	Club
1	GK	Claude Abbes	24 May 1927 (aged 31)	3	(France) Saint-Étienne
2	GK	Dominique Colonna	4 September 1928 (aged 29)	3	(France) Reims
3	GK	François Remetter	8 August 1928 (aged 29)	23	(France) Bordeaux
4	DF	Raymond Kaelbel	31 January 1932 (aged 26)	17	(France) Monaco
5	DF	André Lerond	6 December 1930 (aged 27)	4	(France) Lyon
6	DF	Roger Marche (captain)	5 March 1924 (aged 34)	55	(France) RC Paris
7	DF	Robert Mouynet	25 March 1930 (aged 28)	0	(France) Lyon
8	MF	Bernard Chiarelli	24 February 1934 (aged 24)	1	(France) Valenciennes
9	MF	Kazimir Hnatow	9 January 1929 (aged 29)	0	(France) Angers
10	MF	Robert Jonquet	3 May 1925 (aged 33)	46	(France) Reims
11	MF	Maurice Lafont	13 September 1927 (aged 30)	0	(France) Nîmes
12	MF	Jean-Jacques Marcel	13 June 1931 (aged 26)	25	(France) Marseille
13	DF	Armand Penverne	26 November 1926 (aged 31)	26	(France) Reims
14	MF	Raymond Bellot	9 June 1929 (aged 28)	0	(France) Monaco
15	FW	Stéphane Bruey	11 December 1932 (aged 25)	2	(France) Angers
16	FW	Yvon Douis	16 May 1935 (aged 23)	3	(France) Lille
17	FW	Just Fontaine	18 August 1933 (aged 24)	5	(France) Reims
18	MF	Raymond Kopa	13 October 1931 (aged 26)	24	(Spain) Real Madrid
19	MF	Célestin Oliver	12 July 1930 (aged 27)	5	(France) Sedan
20	FW	Roger Piantoni	26 December 1931 (aged 26)	25	(France) Reims
21	FW	Jean Vincent	29 November 1930 (aged 27)	22	(France) Reims
22	FW	Maryan Wisnieski	1 February 1937 (aged 21)	9	(France) Lens

=== Group stage ===
Pos	Team	Pld	W	D	L	GF	GA	GR	Pts	Qualification
1	France	3	2	0	1	11	7	1.571	4 (Note: France finished ahead of Yugoslavia on goal average.)	Advance to knockout stage
2	Yugoslavia	3	1	2	0	7	6	1.167	4	Advance to knockout stage
3	Paraguay	3	1	1	1	9	12	0.750	3	
4	Scotland	3	0	1	2	4	6	0.667	1	

Source: FIFA

==== France v Paraguay ====
This match was the first time both countries ever faced each other.

Paraguay took the lead in the 20th minute, thanks to Club Nacional winger Florencio Amarilla, before Just Fontaine scored twice in the next 10 minutes to make it 2–1. By the 50th minute, Paraguay had regained the lead after a penalty by Amarilla and a goal from Club Sol de América forward Jorge Romero. Afterwards, France scored five unanswered goals from Roger Piantoni, Maryan Wisniewski, Fontaine, Raymond Kopa, and Jean Vincent to secure a 7–3 win.

At the time, this was the fourth highest-scoring match in FIFA World Cup history, behind Austria's 7–5 win against Switzerland, Brazil's 6–5 win against Poland, and Hungary's 8–3 win against West Germany. Additionally, this result is both France's largest win and Paraguay's largest defeat at a FIFA World Cup.

8 June 1958
19:00 (CET)

France	7–3	Paraguay
Fontaine 24', 30', 67'; Piantoni 52'; Wisnieski 61'; Kopa 70'; Vincent 83'		Amarilla 20', 44' (pen.); Romero 50'

Idrottsparken, Norrköping
Attendance: 16,518
Referee: Juan Gardeazábal Garay (Spain)

==== Yugoslavia v France ====
This was the thirteenth time both countries had faced each other, including previously in the 1954 FIFA World Cup group stage, where Yugoslavia won 1–0.

France took the lead in the fourth minute, thanks to a volley by Fontaine. Aleksandar Petaković equalized in the 16th minute, before Todor Veselinović scored to give Yugoslavia the lead in the 63rd minute. Despite Fontaine scoring an equalizer in the 85th minute, Yugoslavia took the lead again two minutes later thanks to Veselinović, to win the match 3–2.

11 June 1958
19:00 (CET)

Yugoslavia	3–2	France
Petaković 16'; Veselinović 63', 88'		Fontaine 4', 85'

Arosvallen, Västerås
Attendance: 12,217
Referee: Benjamin Griffiths (Wales)

==== France v Scotland ====
This match was the seventh time both countries faced each other, and the first in an official competition.

France took the lead in the 22nd minute, after Kopa scored a volley from 6 meters out following a cross by Fontaine. Afterwards, Scotland were awarded a penalty, which was missed by John Hewie. France doubled their lead in the 44th minute, after an opening created by Robert Jonquet allowed Fontaine to score. Sammy Baird managed to get a consolation goal in the 66th minute, as France won 2–1.

15 June 1958
19:00 (CET)

France	2–1	Scotland
Kopa 22'; Fontaine 44'		Baird 66'

Eyravallen, Örebro
Attendance: 13,554
Referee: Juan Regis Brozzi (Argentina)

=== Quarter-finals ===
This was the third time both countries faced each other.

France took the lead in the lead in the 44th minute, after Wisniewski dribbled past four players to score from close range. In the second half, France scored three times in 13 minutes, with two goals from Fontaine and one from Piatoni, to win 4–0 and qualify for their first ever FIFA World Cup semi-final.

19 June 1958
19:00 (CET)

France	4–0	Northern Ireland
Wisnieski 44'; Fontaine 55', 63'; Piantoni 68'

Idrottsparken, Norrköping
Attendance: 11,800
Referee: Juan Gardeazábal Garay (Spain)

=== Semi-finals ===
This was only the second time both countries had ever faced each other, and the first in an official competition, having previously faced each other in a friendly match in Rio de Janeiro shortly after the 1930 FIFA World Cup.

Early into the match, captain Robert Jonquet tried to make a short pass to André Lerond, but was intercepted by Brazilian winger Garrincha. After passing it to Zito, he was able to get the ball to Vavá, who scored Brazil's first goal within two minutes. Seven minutes later, Just Fontaine scored an equalizer, marking the first goal Brazil had conceded all tournament. In the 35th minute, Jonquet collided with Vavá, causing a double fracture in his fibula, and while being treated off the pitch, Didi scored in the 39th minute from 22 yards out to make it 2–1, giving Brazil the lead again. Brazil then scored a third just before half-time, but was ruled out by referee Benjamin Griffiths after consulting the linesman.

Despite his injury, Jonquet returned to the field for the second half as to not leave France with 10 men due to substitutions not being allowed. He was moved to the left side of the field, swapping positions with Jean-Jacques Marcel, but spent most of the match limping on the left wing, effectively making it so that France were down to 10 men. Afterwards, Brazil began dominating the match, with Pelé scoring a hat-trick in the span of 23 minutes, the first of his international career. Roger Piantoni was able to score a second goal for France in the 83rd minute to make it 5–2.

24 June 1958
19:00 (CET)

Brazil	5–2	France
Vavá 2'; Didi 39'; Pelé 52', 64', 75'		Fontaine 9'; Piantoni 83'

Råsunda Stadium, Solna
Attendance: 27,100
Referee: Benjamin Griffiths (Wales)

=== Third place match ===
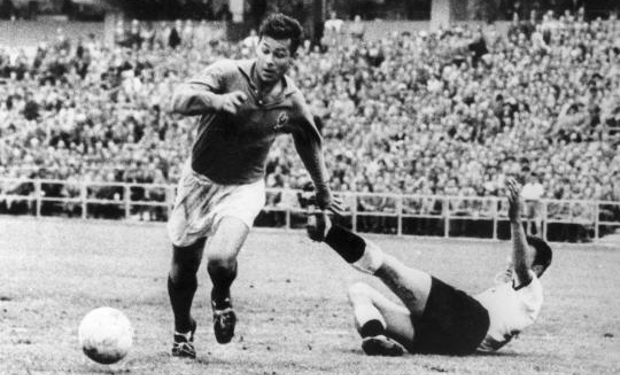
Just Fontaine against West Germany.

This match was the seventh time both countries faced each other, with the last match being a 3–1 win for France in October 1954.

Fontaine opened the scoring in the 16th minute, before Hans Cieslarczyk equalized two minutes later. Kopa scored from the penalty spot nine minutes later, before Fontaine scored his second goal of the match, equaling Sándor Kocsis's record of 11 goals at a FIFA World Cup in the process. France increased their lead again in the 50th minute, after Yvon Douis scored from 20 meters out, before Helmut Rahn scored to make it 4–2. In the 78th minute, Fontaine broke Kocsis' record to make it 5–2, before Hans Schäfer scored West Germany's third six minutes later, and Fontaine scored his fourth goal of the match five minutes after to give France a 6–3 win, and become both the highest goalscorer in FIFA World Cup history, until Gerd Müller broke his record in 1974, as well as the highest goalscorer at a single FIFA World Cup.

This was the last time a French player scored at least four goals in a match, until Kylian Mbappé scored four in an 8–0 win against Kazakhstan during 2022 FIFA World Cup qualification in November 2021.

28 June 1958
17:00 (CET)

France	6–3	West Germany
Fontaine 16', 36', 78', 89'; Kopa 27' (pen.); Douis 50'		Cieslarczyk 18'; Rahn 52'; Schäfer 84'

Ullevi, Gothenburg
Attendance: 32,483
Referee: Juan Regis Brozzi (Argentina)
