= France national football team results (1940–1959) =

- Win Draw Loss

This is a list of the France national football team results from 1940 to 1959.

== 1940s ==
=== 1940 ===
28 January Friendly	France	3 – 2	Portugal	Paris, France
	Heisserer 17'; Koranyi 23', 75'	Report	Peyroteo 83', 85'	Stadium: Parc des Princes; Attendance: 18,083

=== 1942 ===
8 March Friendly	France	0 – 2	Switzerland	Marseille, France
		Report	Amadò 14'; Kappenberger 23'	Stadium: Stade Vélodrome; Attendance: 39,000; Referee: Pedro Escartín (Spain)

15 March Friendly	Spain	4 – 0	France	Seville, Spain
	Campos 4', 68'; Mundo 38'; Epi 85'	Report		Stadium: Estadio de Nervión; Attendance: 40,000; Referee: António Palhinhas (Portugal)

=== 1944 ===
24 December Friendly	France	3 – 1	Belgium	Paris, France
	Simonyi 38'; Arnaudeau 42'; Aston 79'	Report	De Wael 83'	Stadium: Parc des Princes; Attendance: 24,095

=== 1945 ===
8 April Friendly	Switzerland	1 – 0	France	Lausanne, Switzerland
	Friedländer 53'	Report		Stadium: Stade Olympique de la Pontaise; Attendance: 25,000; Referee: Georges Capdeville (France)

26 May Friendly	England	2 – 2	France	London, England
	Carter 10'; Lawton 79'	Report	Vaast 44'; Heisserer 90'	Stadium: Wembley Stadium; Attendance: 60,000; Referee: George Reader (England)

6 December Friendly	Austria	4 – 1	France	Vienna, Austria
	Decker 14', 16', 78'; Neumer 53'	Report	Bongiorni 8'	Stadium: Prater Stadium; Attendance: 55,000; Referee: Jean Lutz (Switzerland)

15 December Friendly	Belgium	2 – 1	France	Brussels, Belgium
	Sermon 19', 33'	Report	Aston 77'	Stadium: Molenbeek Stadium; Attendance: 23,576; Referee: Van Welgenes (Netherlands)

=== 1946 ===
7 April Friendly	France	3 – 0	Czechoslovakia	Paris, France
	Vaast 15', 75'; Heisserer 83'	Report		Stadium: Colombes; Attendance: 52,242; Referee: Eugenio Scherz (Switzerland)

14 April Friendly	Portugal	2 – 1	France	Lisbon, Portugal
	Araújo 39'; Peyroteo 72'	Report	Vaast 68'	Stadium: Estádio Nacional; Attendance: 62,000; Referee: George Reader (England)

5 May Friendly	France	3 – 1	Austria	Paris, France
	Vaast 66'; Heisserer 83'; Leduc 86'	Report	Hahnemann 23'	Stadium: Colombes; Attendance: 57,205; Referee: Paul von Wartburg (Switzerland)

19 May Friendly	France	2 – 1	England	Paris, France
	Prouff 54'; Vaast 78'	Report	Hagan 80'	Stadium: Colombes; Attendance: 58,481; Referee: Eugenio Scherz (Switzerland)

=== 1947 ===
23 March Friendly	France	1 – 0	Portugal	Paris, France
	Bihel 41'	Report		Stadium: Colombes; Attendance: 57,791; Referee: Cyril Barrick (England)

3 May Friendly	England	3 – 0	France	London, England
	Finney 50'; Mannion 64'; Carter 77'	Report		Stadium: Wembley Stadium; Attendance: 54,389; Referee: Louis Baert (Belgium)

26 May Friendly	France	4 – 0	Netherlands	Paris, France
	Alpsteg 17'; Baratte 60', 86'; Dard 75'	Report		Stadium: Colombes; Attendance: 38,215; Referee: Stanley Boardman (England)

1 June Friendly	France	4 – 2	Belgium	Paris, France
	Vaast 13', 84'; Baratte 77'; Dard 83'	Report	De Cleyn 17'; Coppens 76'	Stadium: Colombes; Attendance: 35,176

8 June Friendly	Switzerland	1 – 2	France	Lausanne, Switzerland
	Fatton 16'	Report	Alpsteg 36'; Baratte 44'	Stadium: Wembley Stadium; Attendance: 35,000; Referee: George Reader (England)

23 November Friendly	Portugal	2 – 4	France	Lisbon, Portugal
	Peyroteo 32'; Araújo 71'	Report	Vaast 47', 51', 77'; Benbarek 84'	Stadium: Estádio Nacional; Attendance: 70,000; Referee: Paul von Wartburg (Switzerland)

=== 1948 ===
4 April Friendly	France	1 – 3	Italy	Paris, France
	Baratte 71' (pen.)	Report	Carapallese 31', 39'; Gabetto 36'	Stadium: Colombes; Attendance: 60,074; Referee: Arthur Ellis (England)

23 May Friendly	France	3 – 0	Scotland	Paris, France
	Bongiorni 55'; Flamion 60'; Baratte 79'	Report		Stadium: Colombes; Attendance: 46,032; Referee: Karel van der Meer (Netherlands)

6 June Friendly	Belgium	4 – 2	France	Brussels, Belgium
	Chaves 10', 89'; Govard 76'; Mermans 85'	Report	Cuissard 47'; Benbarek 74'	Stadium: Heysel Stadium; Attendance: 52,873; Referee: Dirk Nijs (Netherlands)

12 June Friendly	Czechoslovakia	0 – 4	France	Prague, Czechoslovakia
		Report	Batteux 62'; Baratte 66', 89'; Baillot 74'	Stadium: Stadion Letná; Attendance: 52,000; Referee: Karel van der Meer (Netherlands)

17 October Friendly	France	3 – 3	Belgium	Paris, France
	Flamion 9', 50'; Baratte 22'	Report	Mermans 23'; Anoul 52'; Chaves 66'	Stadium: Colombes; Attendance: 55,600; Referee: Jean Lutz (Switzerland)

=== 1949 ===
23 April Friendly	Netherlands	4 – 1	France	Rotterdam, Netherlands
	Timmermans 6', 10', 33'; Wilkes 58'	Report	Baratte 3'	Stadium: De Kuip; Attendance: 64,000; Referee: Laurent Franken (Belgium)

27 April Friendly	Scotland	2 – 0	France	Glasgow, Scotland
	Steel 37', 80'	Report		Stadium: Hampden Park; Attendance: 125,631; Referee: William Ling (England)

22 May Friendly	France	1 – 3	England	Paris, France
	Moreel 1'	Report	Morris 8', 86'; Wright 24'	Stadium: Colombes; Attendance: 61,308; Referee: Karel van der Meer (Netherlands)

4 June Friendly	France	4 – 2	Switzerland	Paris, France
	Baillot 26'; Grumellon 30'; Baratte 50', 84'	Report	Fatton 73', 74' (pen.)	Stadium: Colombes; Attendance: 33,474; Referee: George Reader (England)

19 June Friendly	France	1 – 5	Spain	Paris, France
	Baratte 64' (pen.)	Report	Basora 15', 20', 26'; Gaínza 65', 84' (pen.)	Stadium: Colombes; Attendance: 52,217; Referee: Giacomo Bertolio (Italy)

9 October 1950 FIFA World Cup; Qualifying	Yugoslavia	1 – 1	France	Belgrade, Yugoslavia
	Zl. Čajkovski 36'	Report	Baillot 55'	Stadium: JNA Stadium; Attendance: 50,000; Referee: Karel van der Meer (Netherlands)

30 October 1950 FIFA World Cup; Qualifying	France	1 – 1	Yugoslavia	Paris, France
	Baillot 8'	Report	Bobek 44'	Stadium: Colombes; Attendance: 53,569; Referee: Eugenio Scherz (Switzerland)

13 November Friendly	France	1 – 0	Czechoslovakia	Paris, France
	Baratte 8' (pen.)	Report		Stadium: Colombes; Attendance: 38,946

11 December 1950 FIFA World Cup; Qualifying	France	2 – 3 a.e.t.	Yugoslavia	Florence, Italy
	Walter 13'; Luciano 83'	Report	Mihajlović 12', 84' (pen.); Že Čajkovski 114'	Stadium: Stadio Giovanni Berta; Attendance: 25,000; Referee: Giovanni Galeati (Italy)

== 1950s ==
=== 1950 ===
27 May Friendly	France	0 – 1	Scotland	Paris, France
		Report	Brown 69'	Stadium: Colombes; Attendance: 35,568

4 June Friendly	Belgium	4 – 1	France	Brussels, Belgium
	Mermans 6', 62', 83'; Mordant 9'	Report	Kargu 19'	Stadium: Heysel Stadium; Attendance: 45,006; Referee: Giuseppe Carpani (Italy)

1 November Friendly	France	3 – 3	Belgium	Paris, France
	Doye 18'; Baratte 69'; Kargu 87'	Report	Lemberechts 3'; Mermans 17', 36'	Stadium: Colombes; Attendance: 48,799; Referee: Arthur Ellis (England)

10 December Friendly	France	5 – 2	Netherlands	Paris, France
	Flamion 4', 47'; Baratte 29', 49'; Doye 41'	Report	van Melis 34' van der Tuyn 42'	Stadium: Colombes; Attendance: 37,468; Referee: Louis Baert (Belgium)

=== 1951 ===
6 February Friendly	France	2 – 1	Yugoslavia	Paris, France
	Strappe 4'; Flamion 62'	Report	Tomašević 15'	Stadium: Colombes; Attendance: 33,552; Referee: Laurent Franken (Belgium)

12 May Friendly	Northern Ireland	2 – 2	France	Belfast, Northern Ireland
	Ferris 9' (pen.); Simpson 62'	Report	Baratte 16'; Bonifaci 28'	Stadium: Windsor Park; Attendance: 24,000; Referee: Arthur Ellis (England)

16 May Friendly	Scotland	1 – 0	France	Glasgow, Scotland
	Reilly 78'	Report		Stadium: Hampden Park; Attendance: 75,394; Referee: Reg Mortimer (England)

3 June Friendly	Italy	4 – 1	France	Genoa, Italy
	Lorenzi 37', 66'; Amadei 67'; Cappello 87' (pen.)	Report	Grumellon 34'	Stadium: Stadio Luigi Ferraris; Attendance: 52,500; Referee: Jean Lutz (Switzerland)

3 October Friendly	England	2 – 2	France	London, England
	Firoud 4' (o.g.); Medley 32'	Report	Doye 18'; Alpsteg 19'	Stadium: Highbury; Attendance: 57,603; Referee: Jack Mowat (Scotland)

14 October Friendly	Switzerland	1 – 2	France	Geneva, Switzerland
	Ballaman 53'	Report	Doye 27'; Grumellon 34'	Stadium: Charmilles Stadium; Attendance: 33,534; Referee: Reg Leafe (England)

1 November Friendly	France	2 – 2	Austria	Paris, France
	Grumellon 3', 45'	Report	Körner 12'; Stojaspal 15'	Stadium: Colombes; Attendance: 61,687; Referee: William Ling (England)

=== 1952 ===
26 March Friendly	France	0 – 1	Sweden	Paris, France
		Report	Westerberg 86'	Stadium: Parc des Princes; Attendance: 25,779; Referee: Henri Bauwens (Belgium)

20 April Friendly	France	3 – 0	Portugal	Paris, France
	Alpsteg 16'; Strappe 68', 89'	Report		Stadium: Colombes; Attendance: 35,735; Referee: Alf Bond (England)

22 May Friendly	Belgium	1 – 2	France	Brussels, Belgium
	Mermans 28'	Report	Doye 22'; Deladerrière 24'	Stadium: Heysel Stadium; Attendance: 55,485; Referee: Paul von Wartburg (Switzerland)

5 October Friendly	France	3 – 1	West Germany	Paris, France
	Ujlaki 4'; Cisowski 81'; Strappe 90'	Report	O. Walter 16'	Stadium: Colombes; Attendance: 56,021

19 October Friendly	Austria	1 – 2	France	Vienna, Austria
	Walzhofer 47' (pen.)	Report	Baratte 10'; Penverne 26'	Stadium: Prater Stadium; Attendance: 65,000; Referee: Arthur Ellis (England)

11 November Friendly	France	3 – 1	Northern Ireland	Paris, France
	Ujlaki 30'; Kopa 36', 89'	Report	Tully 42'	Stadium: Colombes; Attendance: 52,399; Referee: Klaas Schipper (Netherlands)

16 November Friendly	Republic of Ireland	1 – 1	France	Dublin, Republic of Ireland
	Jonquet 19' (o.g.)	Report	Piantoni 67'	Stadium: Dalymount Park; Attendance: 40,000; Referee: Albert Alsteen (Belgium)

25 December Friendly	France	0 – 1	Belgium	Paris, France
		Report	Straetmans 6'	Stadium: Colombes; Attendance: 38,379

=== 1953 ===
14 May Friendly	France	6 – 1	Wales	Paris, France
	Gardien 10', 33'; Kopa 14', 37'; Bonifaci 73'; Ujlaki 88'	Report	Allchurch 2'	Stadium: Colombes; Attendance: 33,020; Referee: José da Costa Vieira (Portugal)

11 June Friendly	Sweden	1 – 0	France	Solna, Sweden
	Sandell 15'	Report		Stadium: Råsunda Stadium; Attendance: 35,571; Referee: Edvin Pedersen (Norway)

20 September 1954 FIFA World Cup; Qualifying Group 4	Luxembourg	1 – 6	France	Luxembourg City, Luxembourg
	Kohn 6'	Report	Piantoni 5'; Kopa 10'; Cicci 41'; Glovacki 42'; Kargu 73'; Flamion 88'	Stadium: Stade Municipale; Attendance: 15,000; Referee: Ernst Dörflinger (Switzerland)

4 October 1954 FIFA World Cup; Qualifying Group 4	Republic of Ireland	3 – 5	France	Dublin, Republic of Ireland
	Walsh 53' (pen.), 83'; O'Farrell 88'	Report	Glovacki 23'; Penverne 40'; Ujlaki 50', 69'; Flamion 72'	Stadium: Dalymount Park; Attendance: 45,000; Referee: Laurent Franken (Belgium)

18 October Friendly	Yugoslavia	3 – 1	France	Zagreb, Yugoslavia
	Veselinović 47'; Rajkov 55'; Dvornić 61'	Report	Marcel 44'	Stadium: Stadion Maksimir; Attendance: 45,000; Referee: Erich Steiner (Austria)

11 November Friendly	France	2 – 4	Switzerland	Paris, France
	Ujlaki 2', 62'	Report	Antenen 9', 16', 36'; Fatton 21'	Stadium: Colombes; Attendance: 45,986; Referee: Arthur Ellis (England)

25 November 1954 FIFA World Cup; Qualifying Group 4	France	1 – 0	Republic of Ireland	Paris, France
	Piantoni 73'	Report		Stadium: Parc des Princes; Attendance: 32,265; Referee: Lucien Van Nuffel (Belgium)

17 December 1954 FIFA World Cup; Qualifying Group 4	France	8 – 0	Luxembourg	Paris, France
	Desgranges 2', 88'; Vincent 6', 10'; Fontaine 21', 75', 80'; Foix 57'	Report		Stadium: Parc des Princes; Attendance: 20,146; Referee: Roeykens (Belgium)

=== 1954 ===
11 April Friendly	France	1 – 3	Italy	Paris, France
	Piantoni 26'	Report	Pandolfini 29'; Galli 35', 51'	Stadium: Colombes; Attendance: 61,382; Referee: Arthur Ellis (England)

30 May Friendly	Belgium	3 – 3	France	Brussels, Belgium
	Mermans 2'; Anoul 5', 8'	Report	Vincent 7'; Huysmans 39' (o.g.); Kopa 70'	Stadium: Heysel Stadium; Attendance: 54,729; Referee: Vasa Stefanović (Yugoslavia)

16 June 1954 FIFA World Cup; Group 1	France	0 – 1	Yugoslavia	Lausanne, Switzerland
		Report	Milutinović 15'	Stadium: Stade Olympique de la Pontaise; Attendance: 16,000; Referee: Sandy Griffiths (Wales)

19 June 1954 FIFA World Cup; Group 1	France	3 – 2	Mexico	Geneva, Switzerland
	Vincent 19'; Cárdenas 46' (o.g.); Kopa 88' (pen.)	Report	Lamadrid 54'; Balcázar 85'	Stadium: Charmilles Stadium; Attendance: 19,000; Referee: Manuel Asensi Martín (Spain)

16 October Friendly	West Germany	1 – 3	France	Hanover, West Germany
	Stürmer 75'	Report	Foix 33', 55'; Vincent 35'	Stadium: Heysel Stadium; Attendance: 86,000; Referee: Sandy Griffiths (Wales)

11 November Friendly	France	2 – 2	Belgium	Paris, France
	Kopa 75', 87' (pen.)	Report	Jonquet 5' (o.g.); Lemberechts 67'	Stadium: Colombes; Attendance: 53,674

=== 1955 ===
17 March Friendly	Spain	1 – 2	France	Madrid, Spain
	Gaínza 11'	Report	Kopa 35'; Vincent 73'	Stadium: Santiago Bernabéu Stadium; Attendance: 125,000; Referee: Vincenzo Orlandini (Italy)

3 April Friendly	France	2 – 0	Sweden	Paris, France
	Oliver 36'; Glovacki 56'	Report		Stadium: Colombes; Attendance: 34,769; Referee: Giorgio Bernardi (Italy)

15 May Friendly	France	1 – 0	England	Paris, France
	Kopa 37' (pen.)	Report		Stadium: Colombes; Attendance: 54,696; Referee: Emil Schmetzer (West Germany)

9 October Friendly	Switzerland	1 – 2	France	Basel, Switzerland
	Mauron 87'	Report	Kopa 24' (pen.); Piantoni 69'	Stadium: St. Jakob Stadium; Attendance: 54,000; Referee: Roeykens (Belgium)

23 October Friendly	Soviet Union	2 – 2	France	Moscow, Soviet Union
	Streltsov 42'; Simonyan 46'	Report	Kopa 29'; Piantoni 64'	Stadium: Dynamo Stadium; Attendance: 54,000; Referee: Arthur Ellis (England)

11 November Friendly	France	1 – 1	Yugoslavia	Paris, France
	Piantoni 88'	Report	Veselinović 25'	Stadium: Colombes; Attendance: 60,654; Referee: Vincenzo Orlandini (Italy)

25 December Friendly	Belgium	2 – 1	France	Brussels, Belgium
	Jadot 43'; Van den Bosch 76'	Report	Piantoni 63'	Stadium: Heysel Stadium; Attendance: 56,540; Referee: Johann Bronkhorst (Netherlands)

=== 1956 ===
15 February Friendly	Italy	2 – 0	France	Bologna, Italy
	Carapellese 51'; Gratton 75'	Report		Stadium: Stadio Comunale; Attendance: 45,000; Referee: Leo Lemešić (Yugoslavia)

25 March Friendly	France	3 – 1	Austria	Paris, France
	Leblond 15'; Vincent 30'; Piantoni 68'	Report	Hanappi 79'	Stadium: Colombes; Attendance: 42,223; Referee: Arthur Ellis (England)

7 October Friendly	France	1 – 2	Hungary	Paris, France
	Cisowski 51'	Report	Machos 49'; Kocsis 86'	Stadium: Colombes; Attendance: 59,457; Referee: Cesare Jonni (Italy)

21 October Friendly	France	2 – 1	Soviet Union	Paris, France
	Tellechéa 46'; Vincent 54'	Report	Isayev 64'	Stadium: Colombes; Attendance: 62,145; Referee: Sandy Griffiths (Wales)

11 November 1958 FIFA World Cup; Qualifying Group 2	France	6 – 3	Belgium	Paris, France
	Cisowski 13', 15', 44', 72', 88'; Vincent 18'	Report	Houf 16'; Willems 61', 67'	Stadium: Colombes; Attendance: 46,049; Referee: Jack Clough (England)

=== 1957 ===
24 March Friendly	Portugal	0 – 1	France	Lisbon, Portugal
		Report	Piantoni 55'	Stadium: Estádio Nacional; Attendance: 42,000; Referee: Manuel Asensi (Spain)

2 June 1958 FIFA World Cup; Qualifying Group 2	France	8 – 0	Iceland	Nantes, France
	Oliver 6', 11'; Vincent 29', 83'; Dereuddre 36'; Piantoni 45', 81'; Brahimi 49'	Report		Stadium: Stade Malakoff; Attendance: 15,080; Referee: Arthur Ellis (England)

1 September 1958 FIFA World Cup; Qualifying Group 2	Iceland	1 – 5	France	Reykjavík, Iceland
	Jónsson 64'	Report	Cisowski 29', 32'; Ujlaki 48', 66'; Wisnieski 53'	Stadium: Laugardalsvöllur; Attendance: 9,000; Referee: Bobby Davidson (Scotland)

6 October Friendly	Hungary	2 – 0	France	Budapest, Hungary
	Aspiraný 45', 85'	Report		Stadium: Népstadion; Attendance: 94,000; Referee: Leo Horn (Netherlands)

27 October 1958 FIFA World Cup; Qualifying Group 2	Belgium	0 – 0	France	Brussels, Belgium
		Report		Stadium: Heysel Stadium; Attendance: 56,497; Referee: Leo Helge (Denmark)

27 November Friendly	England	4 – 0	France	London, England
	Taylor 3', 33'; Robson 24', 84'	Report		Stadium: Wembley Stadium; Attendance: 64,349; Referee: Nikolay Latyshev (Soviet Union)

25 December Friendly	France	2 – 2	Bulgaria	Paris, France
	Wisnieski 11'; Douis 56'	Report	Diev 55'; Nestorov 75'	Stadium: Parc des Princes; Attendance: 38,086; Referee: Günther Ternieden (West Germany)

=== 1958 ===
13 March Friendly	France	2 – 2	Spain	Paris, France
	Fontaine 49'; Piantoni 65'	Report	Kubala 15'; Suárez 58'	Stadium: Parc des Princes; Attendance: 37,983; Referee: Jack Clough (England)

16 April Friendly	France	0 – 0	Switzerland	Paris, France
		Report		Stadium: Parc des Princes; Attendance: 36,109; Referee: Pieter Roomer (Netherlands)

8 June 1958 FIFA World Cup; Group 2	France	7 – 3	Paraguay	Norrköping, Sweden
	Fontaine 24', 30', 68'; Piantoni 51'; Wisnieski 62'; Kopa 70'; Vincent 84'	Report	Amarilla 20', 43' (pen.); Romero 50'	Stadium: Idrottsparken; Attendance: 16,518; Referee: Juan Gardeazábal (Spain)

11 June 1958 FIFA World Cup; Group 2	France	2 – 3	Yugoslavia	Arosvallen, Sweden
	Fontaine 4', 85'	Report	Petaković 16'; Veselinović 63', 85'	Stadium: Västerås; Attendance: 12,217; Referee: Sandy Griffiths (Wales)

15 June 1958 FIFA World Cup; Group 2	France	2 – 1	Scotland	Örebro, Sweden
	Kopa 22'; Fontaine 45'	Report	Baird 65'	Stadium: Eyravallen; Attendance: 13,554; Referee: Juan Brozzi (Argentina)

19 June 1958 FIFA World Cup; Quarter-finals	France	4 – 0	Northern Ireland	Norrköping, Sweden
	Wisnieski 44'; Fontaine 56', 64'; Piantoni 68'	Report		Stadium: Idrottsparken; Attendance: 11,800; Referee: Juan Gardeazábal (Spain)

24 June 1958 FIFA World Cup; Semi-finals	Brazil	5 – 2	France	Solna, Sweden
	Vavá 2'; Didi 39'; Pelé 52', 64', 75'	Report	Fontaine 9'; Piantoni 82'	Stadium: Råsunda Stadium; Attendance: 27,100; Referee: Sandy Griffiths (Wales)

28 June 1958 FIFA World Cup; Third place play-off	France	6 – 3	West Germany	Gothenburg, Sweden
	Fontaine 15', 36', 77', 89'; Kopa 27' (pen.); Douis 50'	Report	Cieslarczyk 17'; Rahn 52'; Schäfer 83'	Stadium: Ullevi; Attendance: 32,483; Referee: Juan Brozzi (Argentina)

1 October 1960 European Nations'; Cup First round	France	7 – 1	Greece	Paris, France
	Kopa 23'; Fontaine 25', 85'; Cisowski 29', 68'; Vincent 61', 87'	Report	Yfantis 47'	Stadium: Parc des Princes; Attendance: 37,590; Referee: Gottfried Dienst (Switzerland)

5 October Friendly	Austria	1 – 2	France	Vienna, Austria
	Hof 21'	Report	Deladerrière 54'; Fontaine 56'	Stadium: Prater Stadium; Attendance: 70,000; Referee: Cesare Jonni (Italy)

26 October Friendly	France	2 – 2	West Germany	Paris, France
	Deladerrière 23'; Douis 69' (pen.)	Report	Rahn 13'; Seeler 79'	Stadium: Colombes; Attendance: 50,992; Referee: Arthur Ellis (England)

9 November Friendly	France	2 – 2	Italy	Paris, France
	Vincent 15'; Fontaine 84'	Report	Nicolè 57', 65'	Stadium: Colombes; Attendance: 58,112; Referee: Juan Gardeazábal (Spain)

3 December 1960 European Nations'; Cup First round	Greece	1 – 1	France	Athens, Greece
	Marche 85' (o.g.)	Report	Bruey 71'	Stadium: Leoforos Alexandras Stadium; Attendance: 26,000; Referee: Vincenzo Orlandini (Italy)

=== 1959 ===
1 March Friendly	France	2 – 2	Belgium	Paris, France
	Vincent 2', 68'	Report	Lippens 32'; Piters 80'	Stadium: Colombes; Attendance: 42,206; Referee: Jack Kelly (England)

11 October Friendly	Bulgaria	1 – 0	France	Sofia, Bulgaria
	Kolev 88'	Report	Fontaine (red card) 89'	Stadium: Vasil Levski National Stadium; Attendance: 45,000; Referee: Josef Stoll (Austria)

11 November Friendly	France	5 – 3	Portugal	Paris, France
	Fontaine 3', 54', 58'; Grillet 11'; Muller 22'	Report	Matateu 36', 76'; Cavém 41'	Stadium: Colombes; Attendance: 48,111; Referee: Ken Aston (England)

13 December 1960 European Nations'; Cup Quarter-finals	France	5 – 2	Austria	Paris, France
	Fontaine 6', 18', 70'; Vincent 38', 80'	Report	Horak 40'; Pichler 65'	Stadium: Colombes; Attendance: 43,775; Referee: Manuel Asensi (Spain)

17 December Friendly	France	4 – 3	Spain	Paris, France
	Muller 21'; Fontaine 31'; Vincent 36'; Marche 61'	Report	Suárez 22'; Martínez 75'; Vergés 88'	Stadium: Parc des Princes; Attendance: 38,622; Referee: Reg Leafe (England)
