= 1958 FIFA World Cup qualification – UEFA Group 2 =

Football tournament

The three teams in this group played against each other on a home-and-away basis. The group winner France qualified for the sixth FIFA World Cup held in Sweden.

== Table ==
Pos	Team	Pld	W	D	L	GF	GA	GR	Pts	Qualification	France national football team	Belgium national football team	Iceland national football team
1	France	4	3	1	0	19	4	4.750	7	Qualification to 1958 FIFA World Cup	—	6–3	8–0
2	Belgium	4	2	1	1	16	11	1.455	5		0–0	—	8–3
3	Iceland	4	0	0	4	6	26	0.231	0		1–5	2–5	—

Source: FIFA

== Matches ==
11 November 1956

France	6 – 3	Belgium
Cisowski 13', 15', 44', 72', 88'; Vincent 18'	Report	Houf 16'; Willems 61', 67'

Attendance: 46,049
Referee: Clough (England)

2 June 1957

France	8 – 0	Iceland
C. Oliver 6', 11'; Vincent 29', 83'; Dereuddre 36'; Piantoni 45', 81'; Brahimi 49'	Report

Attendance: 15,080
Referee: Ellis (England)

5 June 1957

Belgium	8 – 3	Iceland
Orlans 4', 57'; Piters 11'; Vandenberg 12'; Mees 22', 26'; Coppens 42', 44' (pen.)	Report	Þórðarson 33', 77'; R. Jónsson 81'

Attendance: 6,792
Referee: Blitgen (Luxembourg)

1 September 1957

Iceland	1 – 5	France
Þ. Jónsson 64'	Report	Cisowski 29', 32'; Ujlaki 48', 66'; Wisnieski 53'

Attendance: 9,000
Referee: Davidson (Scotland)

4 September 1957

Iceland	2 – 5	Belgium
R. Jónsson 1'; Þ. Jónsson 65'	Report	Van Herpe 9'; Willems 40'; Vandenberg 64', 81', 89'

Attendance: 7,000
Referee: Davidson (Scotland)

27 October 1957

Belgium	0 – 0	France
	Report

Attendance: 56,497
Referee: Helge (Denmark)
