= 1956–57 in Belgian football =

Football in Belgium
- Season: 1956–57

The 1956–57 season was the 54th season of competitive football in Belgium. R Antwerp FC won their 4th Division I title. RSC Anderlechtois also entered the 1956–57 European Champion Clubs' Cup as Belgian title holder. The Belgium national football team started their 1958 FIFA World Cup qualification campaign, losing to France and winning against Iceland.

== Overview ==
At the end of the season, K Beeringen FC and R Charleroi SC were relegated to Division II and were replaced in Division I by K Waterschei SV Thor and K Sint-Truidense VV from Division II.
The bottom 2 clubs in Division II (RC Tirlemont and RRC de Bruxelles) were relegated to Division III while both Division III winners (KFC Diest and KSC Eendracht Aalst) qualified for Division II.
The bottom 2 clubs of each Division III league SRU Verviers, Mol Sport, FC Vigor Hamme and RUS Tournaisienne were relegated to the Promotion, to be replaced by Overpeltse VV, RCS Brainois, Aarschot Sport and RC Lokeren from Promotion.

== National team ==
Date	Venue	Opponents	Score*	Comp	Belgium scorers
October 14, 1956	Bosuilstadion, Antwerp (H)	The Netherlands	2-3	F	Maurice Willems, Denis Houf
November 11, 1956	Stade Olympique, Colombes (A)	France	3-6	WCQ	Denis Houf, Maurice Willems (2)
December 23, 1956	Kölner Stadion, Köln (A)	Germany	1-4	F	Roland Moyson
March 31, 1957	Heysel Stadium, Brussels (H)	Spain	0-5	F
April 28, 1957	Olympic Stadium, Amsterdam (A)	The Netherlands	1-1	F	Paul Vandenberg
May 26, 1957	Heysel Stadium, Brussels (H)	Romania	1-0	F	Paul Vandenberg
June 5, 1957	Heysel Stadium, Brussels (H)	Iceland	8-3	WCQ	Richard Orlans (2), André Piters, Paul Vandenberg, Victor Mees (2), Henri Coppens (2)

* Belgium score given first

Key

- H = Home match
- A = Away match
- N = On neutral ground
- F = Friendly
- WCQ = World Cup qualification
- o.g. = own goal

== European competitions ==
RSC Anderlecht lost in the first round of the 1956–57 European Champion Clubs' Cup to Manchester United of England (defeat 0-2 at home and defeat 10-0 away).

== Honours ==
Competition	Winner
Division I	R Antwerp FC
Division II	K Waterschei SV Thor
Division III	KFC Diest and KSC Eendracht Aalst
Promotion	Overpeltse VV, RCS Brainois, Aarschot Sport and RC Lokeren

== Final league tables ==
=== Premier Division ===
- 1956-57 Top scorer: Maurice Willems (ARA La Gantoise) with 35 goals.
- 1956 Golden Shoe: Victor Mees (R Antwerp FC)
