= 1956 Ballon d'Or =

Annual football award event in France

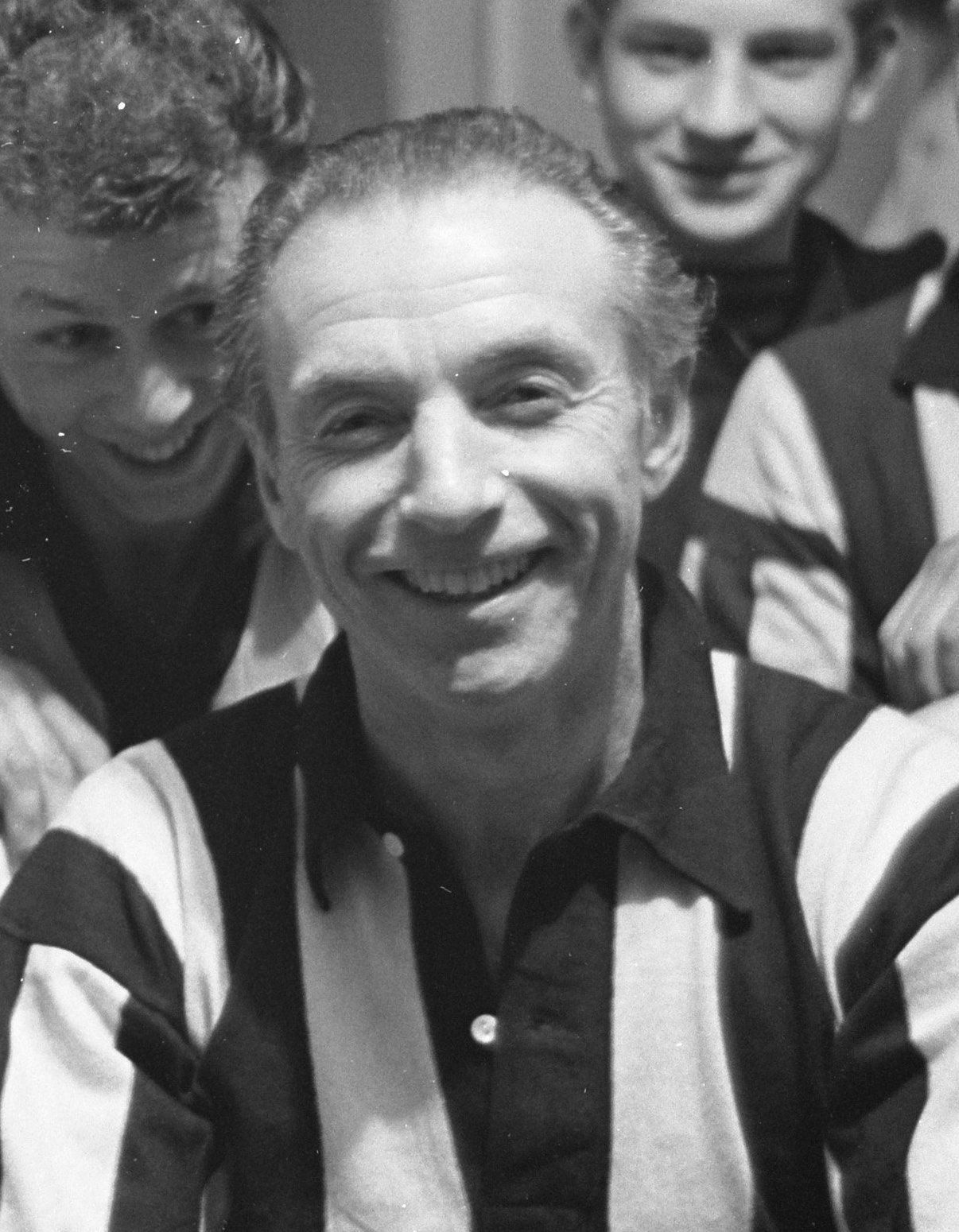
- 1956 Ballon d'Or winner, Stanley Matthews in 1962
- Date: 18 December 1956
- Location: Paris, France
- Presented by: France Football

Highlights
- Won by: (England) Stanley Matthews (1st award)
- Website: ballondor.com

The 1956 Ballon d'Or was the inaugural Ballon d'Or award given to the best football player in Europe as judged by a panel of sports journalists from UEFA member countries. Stanley Matthews received the award on 18 December 1956.

== Rankings ==
Rank	Name	Club(s)	Nationality	Points
1	Stanley Matthews	(England) Blackpool	England	47
2	Alfredo Di Stéfano	(Spain) Real Madrid	Spain (Note: Despite being born in Argentina, Alfredo Di Stéfano acquired Spanish citizenship in 1956, and would play for the Spain national team.)	44
3	Raymond Kopa	(France) Reims (Spain) Real Madrid	France	33
4	Ferenc Puskás	(Hungary) Budapest Honvéd	Hungary	32
5	Lev Yashin	(Soviet Union) Dynamo Moscow	Soviet Union	19
6	József Bozsik	(Hungary) Budapest Honvéd	Hungary	15
7	Ernst Ocwirk	Austria Wien (Italy) Sampdoria	Austria	9
8	Sándor Kocsis	(Hungary) Budapest Honvéd	Hungary	6
9	Thadée Cisowski	(France) RC Paris	France	4
9	Ivan Kolev	(Bulgaria) CDNA Sofia	Bulgaria	4
9	Billy Wright	(England) Wolverhampton Wanderers	England	4
12	Júlio Botelho	(Italy) Fiorentina	Italy (Note: Despite being born in Brazil, Júlio Botelho acquired Italian citizenship in 1956.)	3
13	Stefan Bozhkov	(Bulgaria) CDNA Sofia	Bulgaria	2
13	Duncan Edwards	(England) Manchester United	England	2
13	Gerhard Hanappi	(Austria) Rapid Wien	Austria	2
13	Robert Jonquet	(France) Reims	France	2
13	Miguel Montuori	(Italy) Fiorentina	Italy	2
13	Pepillo	(Spain) Sevilla	Spain	2
13	Juan Alberto Schiaffino	(Italy) Milan	Italy	2
13	Eduard Streltsov	(Soviet Union) Torpedo Moscow	Soviet Union	2
21	Marcelino Campanal	(Spain) Sevilla	Spain	1
21	Břetislav Dolejší	(Czechoslovakia) Dukla Prague	Czechoslovakia	1
21	Roger Piantoni	(France) FC Nancy	France	1
21	Kees Rijvers	(France) Saint-Étienne	Netherlands	1
