= Cieslarczyk =

Cieslarczyk is a surname. Notable people with the surname include:

- Adolphe Cieslarczyk (1916–2024), French painter and sculptor
- Hans Cieslarczyk (1937–2020), German footballer
