= Helgi Daníelsson =

Helgi Daníelsson may refer to:

- Helgi Daníelsson (footballer, born 1981), Icelandic footballer
- Helgi Daníelsson (footballer, born 1933), Icelandic footballer
