= 1959 Ballon d'Or =

Annual football award event in France

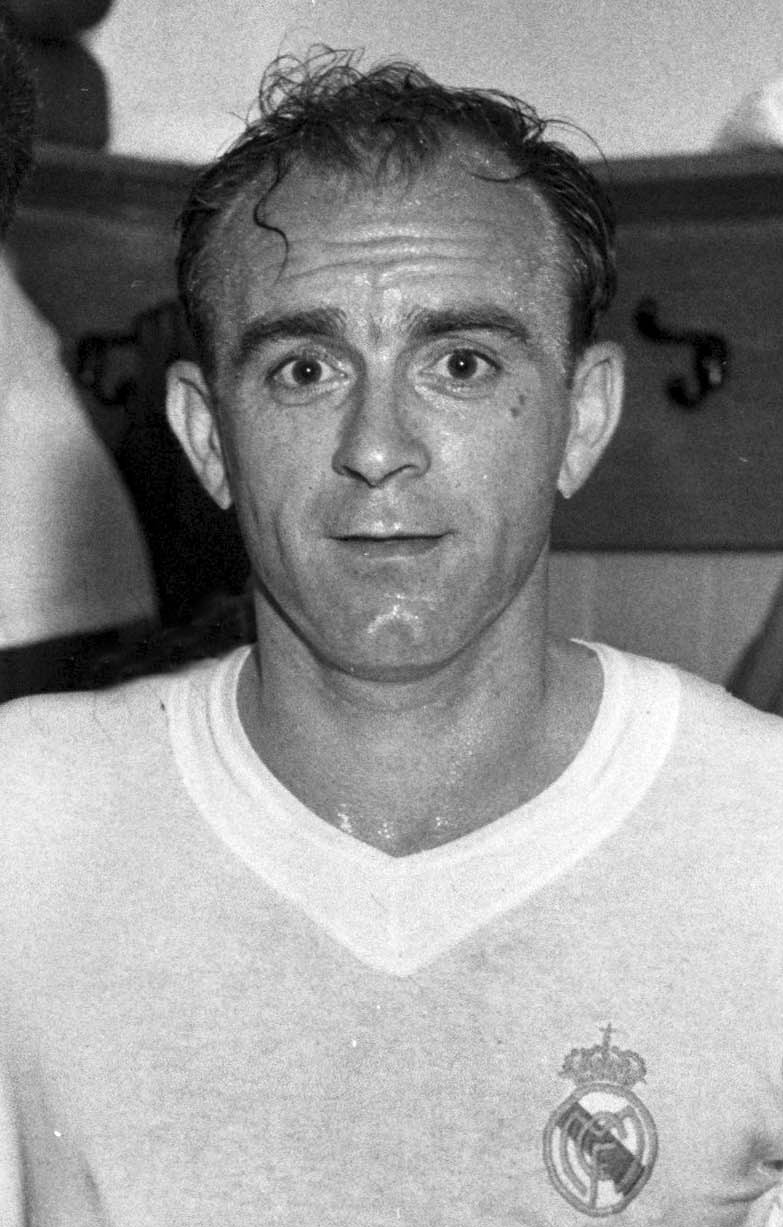
- 1959 Ballon d'Or winner, Alfredo Di Stéfano
- Date: 15 December 1959
- Location: Paris, France
- Presented by: France Football

Highlights
- Won by: (Spain) Alfredo Di Stéfano (2nd award)
- Website: ballondor.com

The 1959 Ballon d'Or, given to the best football player in Europe as judged by a panel of sports journalists from UEFA member countries, was awarded to Alfredo Di Stéfano on 15 December 1959. It was the second time that Di Stéfano won the award.

== Rankings ==
Rank	Name	Club(s)	Nationality	Points
1	Alfredo Di Stéfano	(Spain) Real Madrid	Spain (Note: Despite being born in Argentina, Alfredo Di Stéfano acquired Spanish citizenship in 1956, and went on to play for the Spain national team.)	80
2	Raymond Kopa	(Spain) Real Madrid (France) Reims	France	42
3	John Charles	(Italy) Juventus	Wales	24
4	Luis Suárez	(Spain) Barcelona	Spain	22
5	Agne Simonsson	(Sweden) Örgryte IS	Sweden	20
6	Lajos Tichy	(Hungary) Budapest Honvéd	Hungary	18
7	Ferenc Puskás	(Spain) Real Madrid	Hungary	16
8	Francisco Gento	(Spain) Real Madrid	Spain	12
9	Helmut Rahn	(West Germany) Rot-Weiss Essen (West Germany) 1. FC Köln	West Germany	11
10	Horst Szymaniak	(West Germany) Wuppertaler SV (West Germany) Karlsruher SC	West Germany	8
11	Lev Yashin	(Soviet Union) Dynamo Moscow	Soviet Union	7
12	Yuriy Voynov	(Soviet Union) Dynamo Kyiv	Soviet Union	5
13	Dezső Bundzsák	(Hungary) Vasas	Hungary	4
13	Gyula Grosics	(Hungary) Tatabánya	Hungary	4
13	Ivan Kolev	(Bulgaria) CDNA Sofia	Bulgaria	4
13	Nils Liedholm	(Italy) Milan	Sweden	4
17	Titus Buberník	(Czechoslovakia) ČH Bratislava	Czechoslovakia	3
17	Just Fontaine	(France) Reims	France	3
17	Georgi Naydenov	(Bulgaria) CDNA Sofia	Bulgaria	3
20	Flórián Albert	(Hungary) Ferencváros	Hungary	2
20	Uwe Seeler	(West Germany) Hamburger SV	West Germany	2
20	Joan Segarra	(Spain) Barcelona	Spain	2
23	János Göröcs	(Hungary) Újpest	Hungary	1
23	Ken Jones	(England) Scunthorpe United	Wales	1
23	Roger Marche	(France) RC Paris	France	1
23	Antoni Ramallets	(Spain) Barcelona	Spain	1
