= 1957–58 Coupe de France =

Tournament details
- Country: France

Final positions
- Champions: Stade de Reims
- Runners-up: Nîmes Olympique

The Coupe de France's results of the 1957–58 season. Stade de Reims won the final played on May 18, 1958, beating Nîmes Olympique.

== Round of 16 ==
Team 1	Score	Team 2
Stade de Reims (D1)	2–0	Olympique Lyonnais (D1)
CO Roubaix-Tourcoing (D2)	2–1	RC Besançon (D2)
RC Lens (D1)	3–2	Le Havre AC (D2)
Girondins de Bordeaux (D2)	1–0	RCF Paris (D1)
Nîmes Olympique (D1)	2–0	FC Mulhouse (CFA)
FC Sète (D2)	1–1 (a.e.t.)	Olympique Alès (D1)
AS Monaco (D1)	3–0	SC Toulon (D2)
RC Strasbourg (D2)	2–1	FC Rouen (D2)
Replay
FC Sète (D2)	1–0	Olympique Alès (D1)

== Quarter-finals ==
Team 1	Score	Team 2
Stade de Reims (D1)	7–4	CO Roubaix-Tourcoing (D2)
RC Lens (D1)	1–0	Girondins de Bordeaux (D2)
Nîmes Olympique (D1)	2–1	FC Sète (D2)
AS Monaco (D1)	2–1	RC Strasbourg (D2)

== Semi-finals ==
27 April 1958

Stade de Reims (1)	2–1	RC Lens (1)
Fontaine 56'; Vincent 60'	Report	Dereuddre 75'

27 April 1958

Nîmes Olympique (1)	2–1	AS Monaco (1)
Salaber 14'; D. Duc 69'	Report	Kaelbel 73' (pen.)

== Final ==
18 May 1958

Reims	3–1	Nîmes
Bliard 42', 89'; Fontaine 56'		Mazouz 49'

Stade Olympique Yves-du-Manoir, Colombes
Attendance: 56,523
Referee: Augustin Le Menn
