= Robert Lamartine =

French footballer (1935–1990)

Personal information
- Date of birth: 15 June 1935
- Place of birth: Decize, France
- Date of death: 16 January 1990 (aged 54)
- Position: Midfielder

Senior career*
Years	Team	Apps	(Gls)
1955–1959	Reims		
1959–1963	Angers		
1963	Montpellier		
1963–1964	Rennes		
- * Club domestic league appearances and goals

Robert Lamartine (15 June 1935 – 16 January 1990) was a French football midfielder. He played in one European Cup final in 1959.
