= Roger Piantoni =

French footballer (1931–2018)

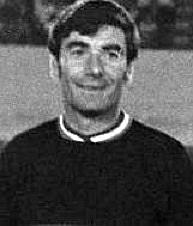
- Piantoni in 1970

Personal information
- Date of birth: 26 December 1931
- Place of birth: Étain, France
- Date of death: 26 May 2018 (aged 86)
- Place of death: Ludres, France
- Height: 1.74 m (5 ft 9 in)
- Position: Inside forward

Youth career
- 1946–1950: US Piennes

Senior career*
| Years | Team | Apps | (Gls) |
| 1950–1957 | Nancy | 239 | (91) |
| 1957–1964 | Reims | 198 | (145) |
| 1964–1966 | Nice | 48 | (20) |
| Total | | 485 | (256) |

International career
| 1952–1961 | France | 37 | (18) |
Medal record
Representing France
FIFA World Cup
| Third place | 1958 Sweden |
- * Club domestic league appearances and goals

Roger Piantoni (26 December 1931 – 26 May 2018) was a French footballer who played as an inside-forward and was a star on the France national team in the late 1950s. During the 1949–1950 season, he was the champion of Lorraine with his team, and was the top scorer in the league with 35 goals. At the 1958 FIFA World Cup, Piantoni was considered one of the best French players of his time. He was nicknamed Bout d'chou, meaning "Cabbage Tip", ranking as the sixth top scorer in the French Championship with a total of 203 goals in Division 1.

== Early life ==
Roger Piantoni spent his youth in the mining town of La Mourière, in the community of Piennes in Meurthe-et-Moselle. There he was known for playing with Thadée Cisowski in the local club, US Piennes. In 1948, with the youth team of Lorraine, he won the National Youth Cup by beating a youth team from the South-East in the championship. Henri Biancheri and Francis Méano were also on the South-Eastern team. He also played later against Raymond Kopaszewski who was on a northern youth team. The following year, he was accepted onto the French Junior team for the European championship. However, he performed poorly due to insufficient cardio. Fellow France national team player Michel Platini later experienced the same disappointment.

== Club career ==
=== Nancy ===
Piantoni began his career at the age of 19 with FC Nancy during 1950–1951 season. In the first match of the championships, against RC Lens on 27 August 1950, he scored two goals. In his first season, he managed to become the top scorer of the championship with 27 goals. He scored five goals on the 28th day against Le Havre (6–1) and two quadruples (four goals) during the return match against RC Lens (4–2) and RC Strasbourg on the final day (5–1). In November 1952, in a friendly match against Ireland, he was selected to join the France national team for the first time.

Over the course of seven seasons with FC Nancy, he scored a total of 92 goals. He and his teammates achieve some top performances in the Coupe de France. They reached the semi-finals of the season of 1950–1951, and the finals in 1953 (which was played on 31 May in Colombes.) FC Nancy, led by Jacques Favre, lost 2–1 against Lille. A few months later, on 23 September 1953, FC Nancy beat Real Madrid 4–2 on their Chamartin field (later renamed Santiago Bernabéu) in a friendly match. This match was remarkable as the official debuts of Piantoni for FC Nancy, and Alfredo Di Stéfano for Madrid.

However, FC Nancy faced major financial problems. During the 1956–1957 season, they were demoted to the second division and the club was forced to let its best players go. Piantoni was transferred for 250,000 francs (25 million former francs before 1960, which is about $256,000 US) to Stade de Reims which had just sold Raymond Kopa to Real Madrid.

=== Reims ===
At Stade de Reims, along with Just Fontaine and Jean Vincent, Piantoni won the France championship. In 1958, with the help of his teammates, they landed in the capital of Champagne. They quickly forgot the departure of Raymond Kopa, the hero of the Stade Auguste-Delaune, who left a year earlier for Real Madrid. In March 1958, Piantoni recorded a quadruple against the regional rival, Sedan. On 1 May, Reims were French champions, giving Piantoni his first national trophy just a few weeks before the 1958 French Cup.

He scored 17 goals in 32 games in the 1957–1958 season, then scored a further 20 goals the following season. It appeared to be the perfect match with Just Fontaine on the front of the attack, and they dominated the championship of France during the 1950s and the early 1960s.

At that time, Piantoni and several of his teammates also participated in the 1958 World Cup in Sweden, where Albert Batteux (the coach, also his club coach, was beaten in the semifinal by Brazil).

After his exploits in Sweden, Piantoni returned with the Rémois but the defending championship team was struggling; it finished fourth with eight points at the end of the year. As an individual, he found success with 20 goals in 30 matches. On the European stage, the Reims reached their second European Cup final of the champions clubs in their history. In a final in Stuttgart on 3 June 1959, they lost to Real Madrid (0–2), in the European champion title game.

A few weeks after the end of this remarkable European run, Piantoni and his teammates took the field for the 1959–1960 edition of the French championship. The scored 109 goals in 38 matches. This remarkable dominance was matched only by RC Paris, the only other club able to compete with them offensively. With two titles already for Piantoni, he scored 18 goals that season (ten fewer than Fontaine).

The 1960–61 season was less glorious for Stade de Reims who finished seven points behind AS Monaco in May, due to the serious injury that hit their star forward Fontaine just a few months earlier. He had a double fracture in his leg, effectively ending his career. As a result of this injury, Fontaine ended discussions for a possible transfer of Piantoni to the Argentinian club of River Plate. Piantoni then became the team's leading scorer, and the country's best playmaker that season, eleven years after his title as top scorer with FC Nancy.

In the international match up of France-Bulgaria, 11 October 1959, he was injured by Nikola Kovatchev, who broke his knee. The injury required several operations and made a lasting impact on the rest of his career. This recurring injury caused him to go through long periods of rehabilitation where he was unable to play. In his last three seasons in Reims, from 1961 to 1964, he played only 37 league games, achieving 23 goals. In 1961–1962, they won their sixth national title and, despite his physical problems, he achieved 16 goals in just 18 matches.

He scored his last goal with the Champenois on 3 May 1964, during a home game defeat (1–4) against Valenciennes.

=== Nice ===
In 1964, Piantoni joined OGC Nice, in the second division, where he played a full season. The Niçois won the second division championship and gained their promotion in the 1st division for the following season, after which he announced his retirement.

== International career ==
Piantoni received his first selection on 16 November 1952, in a friendly match in Dublin between the French team and Ireland (1–1). Piantoni tied the score for French at the 67th minute mark.

In 1954, he did not participate in the World Cup in Switzerland. Injured a few months earlier during a France-Italy, he was unable to recover in time.

Selected for the 1958 World Cup, he was one of the French players who brought the team to the semifinals, losing 5–2 to Pele's Brazil team. Teaming with Just Fontaine and Raymond Kopa, Piantoni played the first five games where he scored four goals, including the second in the semi-final against the Seleção. Due to emergency surgery for appendicitis, he did not play during the game against Germany, whom they beat 6–3 to secure third place. He played his last match with Les Bleus on 28 September 1961, a qualifying match for the 1962 World Cup in Chile against Finland (5–1). In the 79th minute of play on a free kick, he scored the last goal of his international career.

From 1952 to 1961, Piantoni played 37 matches under the blue jersey, scoring 18 goals.

== Post-playing career ==
After leaving Nice he became coach of the club of Carpentras from 1967 to 1971. He was later a member of the Federal Council of the French Football Federation (FFF) from 29 August 1970 to 31 December 1988.

He remained attached to the Lorraine and the club of Nancy. He also worked for several years as a commentator on football matches on Antenne 2 alongside Michel Drucker and Bernard Père.

A tribune at the Stade Marcel Picot, where AS Nancy-Lorraine is, bears his name.

== Honours ==
Reims

- Division 1: 1957–58, 1959–60, 1961–62
- Coupe de France: 1957–58
- Coupe Mohamed V: 1962
- European Cup runner-up: 1958–59

France

- FIFA World Cup third place: 1958

Individual

- Division 1 top scorer: 1950–51, 1960–61
