= Claude Bourrigault =

French footballer (1932–2021)

Personal information
- Date of birth: 28 January 1932
- Place of birth: Mazé, France
- Date of death: 24 August 2021 (aged 89)
- Place of death: Avrillé, France
- Height: 1.71 m (5 ft 7 in)
- Position: Midfielder

Senior career*
Years	Team	Apps	(Gls)
1954–1963	Angers	310	(26)
1963–1964	Rennes	12	(0)
1964–1965	Angers	3	(0)
Total		325	(26)
- * Club domestic league appearances and goals

Claude Bourrigault (28 January 1932 – 24 August 2021) was a French footballer who played midfielder. He was the brother-in-law of Raymond Kopa.

== Biography ==
Born in Mazé, Bourrigault spent most of his career with Angers. He joined the club in 1954, when it was part of Division 2. He played a role in Angers' rise to Division 1 in 1956 and played in the final of the 1957 Coupe de France, a loss to Toulouse FC. He scored the final goal of the game, but it was not enough to counter six goals from Toulouse.

For the 1963–64 season, Bourrigault played for Rennes, although for only twelve games. He then returned to Angers, where he played one final season before retiring.

Claude Bourrigault died in Avrillé on 24 August 2021 at the age of 89.
