= Raymond Kopa =

French footballer (1931–2017)

- Kopa in 1962

Personal information
- Full name: Raymond Kopa
- Birth name: Raymond Kopaszewski
- Date of birth: 13 October 1931
- Place of birth: Nœux-les-Mines, Pas-de-Calais, France
- Date of death: 3 March 2017 (aged 85)
- Place of death: Angers, Maine-et-Loire, France
- Height: 1.68 m (5 ft 6 in)
- Positions: Forward; attacking midfielder

Youth career
- 1941–1949: Nœux-les-Mines

Senior career*
Years	Team	Apps	(Gls)
1949–1951	Angers	60	(15)
1951–1956	Reims	158	(48)
1956–1959	Real Madrid	79	(24)
1959–1967	Reims	244	(36)
Total		541	(123)

International career
1952	France B	1	(1)
1952–1962	France	45	(18)
Medal record
Men's football
Representing France
FIFA World Cup
Third place	1958
- * Club domestic league appearances and goals

Raymond Kopa (né Kopaszewski; 13 October 1931 – 3 March 2017) was a French professional footballer who played as a forward and attacking midfielder. Known for his dribbling, playmaking, and prolific goalscoring, he was considered one of the greatest players of all-time, and an integral part of the France national team during the 1950s.

At club level, Kopa began at his local club Nœux-les-Mines. Following the French national youth football trials in 1949, he signed with Angers, spending two seasons at the club before joining Reims for 1.8 million francs. At Reims, he won two French Division 1 titles and the 1953 Latin Cup, as well as reaching the first ever European Cup final, where they lost to Real Madrid. He signed for Madrid in the summer of 1956, for 52 million francs, helping them win two La Liga titles and three European Cups. Despite being originally set to join Belgian club Anderlecht in the summer of 1959, Kopa rejoined Reims, he remained until his retirement from football in 1967.

Kopa made a total of 45 appearances for the France national team between 1952 and 1962, scoring 18 goals. In March 1955, he was given the nickname "the Napoleon of football", following a 2–1 win against Spain in Madrid. At the 1958 FIFA World Cup, he famously formed a trio with Roger Piantoni and Just Fontaine as France finished third, with Kopa being chosen as the tournament's best player. He retired from international football in October 1963, following a World XI match against England to celebrate The Football Association's centenary.

In 1958, Kopa was awarded the Ballon d'Or. In 1970, he became the first football player to receive the Legion of Honour. In 2004, Pelé named him one of the 125 Greatest Living Footballers at a FIFA Awards Ceremony. He died in Angers on 3 March 2017, at the age of 85.

== Early life ==
Kopa was born on 13 October 1931 in Nœux-les-Mines, France. His father was born in Germany, while his grandparents were of Polish ethnicity from Kraków, who moved to France following World War I to work as miners. His surname, Kopaszewski, was shortened to Kopa while in elementary school.

He began working as a miner at the age of 14, alongside his grandfather, father, and brother. He worked there for just over two year, before losing part of his finger in a mining accident in October 1947. In 1952, Kopa acquired French nationality at his majority.

== Club career ==
=== Early career and Angers ===
In 1941, at the age of 10, Kopa joined the academy of local club US Nœux-les-Mines. In 1949, he entered that year's French national youth football trials, where he won the northern competition and qualified for the national final, finishing second to Jean Saupin. Afterwards, he expected to get a contract from one of the French Division 1 teams, but only received an offer from Division 2 side Angers.

He made debut for the club under manager Camille Cottin, and later made 60 appearances across two seasons for the club, scoring 15 goals. While at Angers, Kopa also worked as an electrician.

=== Reims ===
After watching Kopa play in a friendly match, Albert Batteux signed him for Stade de Reims in September 1951 for a transfer fee of 1.8 million francs (around £1,300). He made his Reims debut on 2 September 1951, in a 0–0 draw against Strasbourg. At the club, he was mentored by both Batteux, who served as both his club and national team manager, and teammate Paul Sinibaldi, who became the godfather to Kopa's son Denis.

With Reims, Kopa won two Division 1 titles in the 1952–53 and 1954–55 seasons, as well as the 1953 Latin Cup, where he scored twice in the final against AC Milan at the Estádio Nacional do Jamor in Lisbon, and finished as the competition's second-highest goal scorer. Additionally, he helped Reims reach the finals of both the 1955 Latin Cup and 1955–56 European Cup. Before leaving Reims, he received an offer to join AC Milan, who were prepared to break the world transfer record to sign him, but Kopa rejected it as he wanted to join Real Madrid instead.

In total, Kopa made 138 appearances for Stade de Reims in the French Division 1, scoring 48 goals. His last game for the club was the 1956 European Cup final, where they lost to Real Madrid. Although he was expected to miss the final due to injury, Batteux played him anyways.

=== Real Madrid ===
Prior to the 1956 European Cup final, Kopa had agreed to join Real Madrid for a transfer fee of 52 million francs (around £38,000). Additionally, reports claimed that Madrid had offered Kopa ten times what his salary was at Reims. He made his Madrid debut on 4 October 1956, in a friendly match against French team Sochaux, where he scored a hat-trick in a 14–1 win. Just over two weeks later, he made his La Liga debut, where he scored twice in a 7–1 win against Real Jaén.

At Madrid, Kopa gained the nickname 'Kopita', meaning 'little Kopa'. There, he helped them win two La Liga titles in the 1956–57 and 1957–58 seasons, as well as the 1957 Latin Cup against Benfica and three European Cups in the 1956–57, 1957–58, and 1958–59 seasons. During the 1959 European Cup final, Kopa was injured following a bad tackle by Reims's Jean Vincent. After the 1958–59 season, Real Madrid wanted to extend Kopa's contract with the club, and offered him a five-year contract with a large salary increase, but Kopa rejected it as his wife wanted to return to France.

In December 1958, Kopa won the Ballon d'Or, awarded by French magazine France Football, with a total of 71 votes. He had previously finished in third place twice, in 1956, behind teammate Alfredo Di Stéfano and winner Stanley Matthews, and in 1957, tied with Duncan Edwards and behind Billy Wright and winner Di Stéfano.

In total, Kopa played 110 matches for Real Madrid, scoring 32 goals. He later returned to play in a tribute match for club captain Francisco Gento against River Plate in September 1965.

=== Failed move to Anderlecht and return to Reims ===
Kopa in 1963

On 8 July 1959, it was announced that Kopa would sign with Belgian club Anderlecht, for around 2.5 million francs (around £20,000). As he was ineligible for the 1959–60 Belgian First Division, the plan was to have him play in friendlies and the European Cup for a year, before rejoining Reims in the 1960–61 season. However, just over a week after the announcement, the transfer was cancelled over a contract dispute, as the club wanted to pay Kopa monthly, while he wanted his wages as a lump sum. Instead, he returned to Stade de Reims that summer.

In December 1959, Kopa finished second in the 1959 Ballon d'Or, behind former teammate Di Stéfano. With Reims, he won two Division 1 titles in the 1959–60 and 1961–62 seasons, but suffered multiple ankle injuries during this time. In June 1963, Kopa made comments to the press claiming that "players are slaves" because of lifetime contracts, where players were contracted to their clubs until they turned 35. His comments caused a large controversy in French football, which resulted in him getting a six-month suspended ban from football. According to Kopa, he had been asked by teammate Dominique Colonna to make the comments.

During the 1963–64 season, Kopa was suspended for two weeks in October 1963 by the French Football Federation, because of his international retirement, with Reims later suffering relegation to Division 2 after finishing 17th in the league. Kopa stayed with Reims in Division 2, and helped them get promoted after winning the league in the 1965–66 season, before later announcing his retirement in the summer of 1967. He later returned to Reims to play one match in the 1968–69 Coupe de France, where he scored.

In total, Kopa played 592 games in his career, scoring 139 goals.

== International career ==
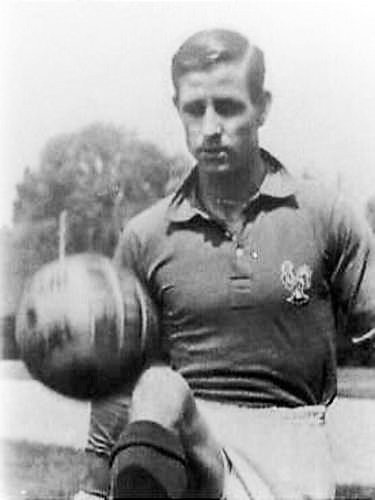
Kopa with France in 1960

Kopa made 45 appearances for the France national team between 1952 and 1962, scoring 18 goals. His debut for France came on 5 October 1952, in a 3–1 win against West Germany in Colombes.

At the 1954 FIFA World Cup, Kopa played in both of France's matches, a 1–0 loss against Yugoslavia and a 3–2 win against Mexico where he scored a penalty, as France were eliminated in the group stage. Following their elimination, the French press began targeting Kopa due to his Polish background, with one journalist yelling at him to "Go back to the mine!".

In March 1955, following a 2–1 win against Spain at the Estadio Santiago Bernabéu in Madrid, Spanish newspaper Marca gave him the nickname 'Pequeño Napoleon' ('Little Napoleon'), while Daily Express journalist Desmond Hackett called him the "Napoleon of football". After his performance that match, he caught the attention of Real Madrid president Santiago Bernabéu, who had been in attendance, and declared Kopa a transfer target for the club. Later on, Kopa called this match the best of his career.

Following his transfer to Real Madrid in the summer of 1956, he did not play for France again until the 1958 FIFA World Cup, where he formed a trio with teammates Roger Piantoni and Just Fontaine that later continued at Reims between 1959 and 1962. In Sweden, Kopa scored three goals, including against Paraguay and Scotland in the group stage, and against West Germany in the third place match, as France finished third. Afterwards, he was chosen as the best player of the tournament.

During 1960 European Nations' Cup qualifying, Kopa made three appearances, being a 7–1 win against Greece and both matches against Austria, as France qualified for the final tournament. However, he missed the 1960 European Nations' Cup due to an injury. His final match for France came on 11 November 1962, being a 3–2 loss to Hungary.

As well as France, Kopa played for a Europe XI against the United Kingdom in Belfast on 13 August 1955, and for a World XI against England on 23 October 1963, to celebrate the centenary of The Football Association. Following the World XI match, Kopa announced his international retirement following disagreements with France selection committee member Georges Verriest. Despite his retirement, there were calls for him to be included in France's squad for the 1966 FIFA World Cup in England, although he was not included in their 40-man shortlist for the tournament in May 1966.

== Post-football career ==
Following his retirement, Kopa launched his own sportswear brand. He later retired from that in 1991, eventually settling in Corsica. In 1985, he competed in that year's Paris–Dakar Rally, where he finished 64th alongside Étienne Smulevici in a Mitsubishi Pajero.

== Personal life ==
Kopa's wife Christiane (née Bourigault) was a basketball player who he met while playing at Angers. Her brother, Claude Bourrigault, was also a French footballer who spent most of his career at Angers. Kopa and Christiane had three kids together, but their son Denis died of cancer in 1963 at the age of four.

In 1961, Kopa helped Eugène N'Jo Léa, Just Fontaine, and Jacques Bertrand create the Union Nationale des Footballeurs Professionnels, a trade union for professional footballers in France, and later served as the union's vice-president. In 1970, Kopa became the first footballer to be awarded the Légion d'Honneur. In March 2004, Kopa was named by Pelé as one of the 125 greatest living footballers.

=== Death and legacy ===
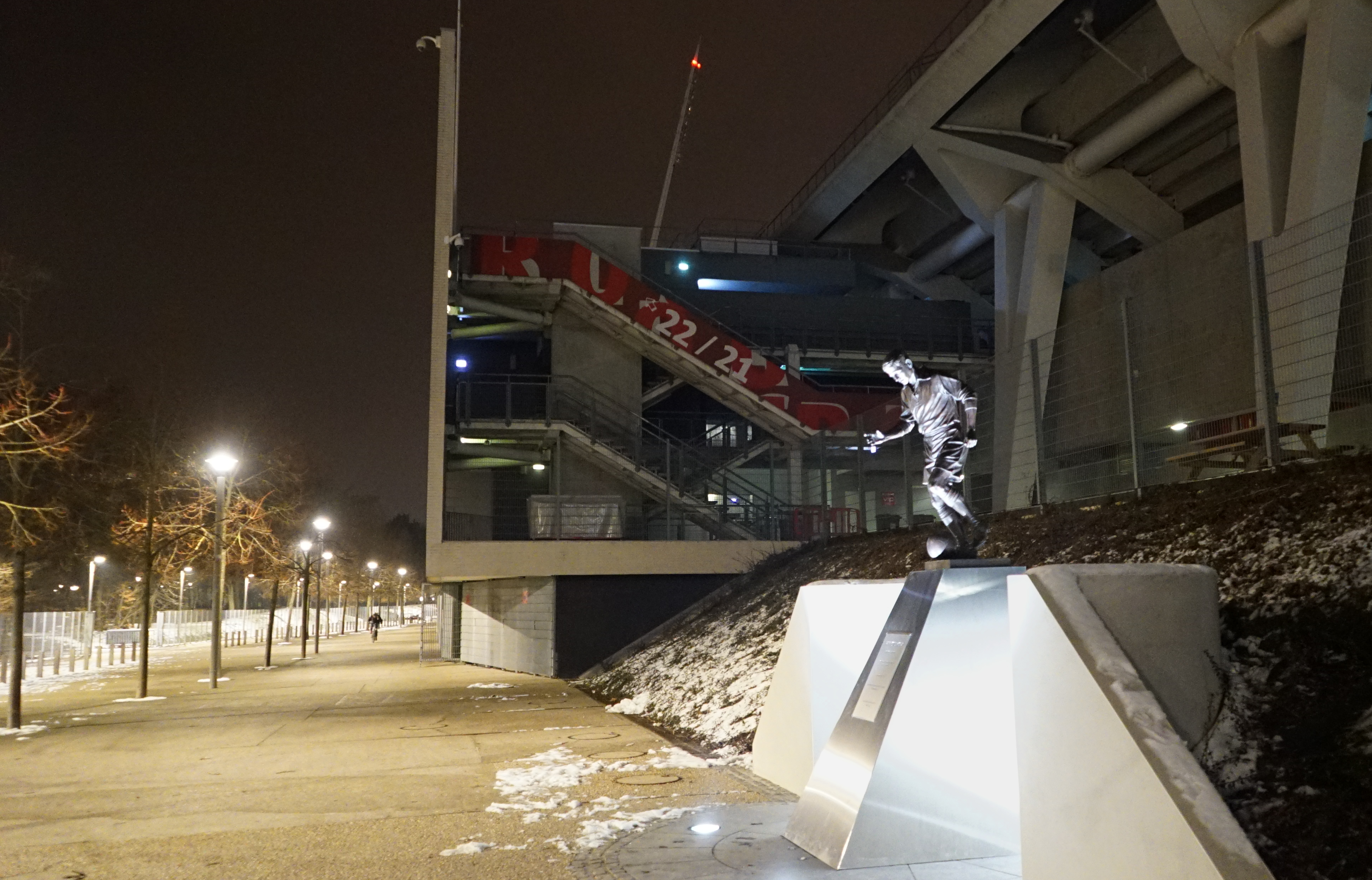
The statue of Kopa located outside the Stade Auguste-Delaune.

Kopa died in Angers on 3 March 2017, at the age of 85, having reportedly been hospitalized a week before his death. His funeral was held at the Saint-Maurice Cathedral five days later.

Less than a month after his death, Angers announced they were renaming the Stade Jean-Bouin after him. In December 2018, Stade de Reims built a statue of Kopa outside of the Stade Auguste-Delaune.

In 2018, France Football launched the Kopa Trophy, awarded to the best young footballer in the calendar year, which was named in his honor. The award's first recipient was fellow Frenchman Kylian Mbappé.

== Career statistics ==
=== Club ===
Appearances and goals by club, season and competition
Club	Season	League			Cup (Note: Includes the Coupe de France, Coupe Charles Drago, and Copa del Rey)		European Cup		Total	
Club	Season	Division	Apps	Goals	Apps	Goals	Apps	Goals	Apps	Goals
Angers	1949–50	Division 2	30	7	1	0	–		31	7
Angers	1950–51	Division 2	30	7	–		–		30	7
Angers	Total		60	14	1	0	–		61	15
Reims	1951–52	Division 1	33	8	3	3	–		36	11
Reims	1952–53	Division 1	33	13	3	0	–		36	13
Reims	1953–54	Division 1	31	11	6	3	–		37	14
Reims	1954–55	Division 1	31	11	5	0	–		36	11
Reims	1955–56	Division 1	30	5	5	4	7	0	42	9
Reims	Total		158	48	22	10	7	0	187	58
Real Madrid	1956–57	La Liga	22	6	2	0	8	2	32	8
Real Madrid	1957–58	La Liga	27	8	2	1	7	3	36	12
Real Madrid	1958–59	La Liga	30	10	5	1	7	1	42	12
Real Madrid	Total		79	24	9	2	22	6	110	32
Reims	1959–60	Division 1	36	14	5	1	–		41	15
Reims	1960–61	Division 1	30	5	4	2	1	0	35	7
Reims	1961–62	Division 1	30	2	5	0	–		35	2
Reims	1962–63	Division 1	34	1	4	1	4	2	42	4
Reims	1963–64	Division 1	25	2	5	0	–		30	2
Reims	1964–65	Division 2	29	3	3	1	–		32	4
Reims	1965–66	Division 2	27	3	7	1	–		34	4
Reims	1966–67	Division 1	33	3	2	1	–		35	4
Reims	1968–69	Division 2	–		1	1	–		1	1
Reims	Total		244	33	36	8	5	2	285	43
Career total			541	119	68	20	34	8	643	147

=== International ===
Appearances and goals by national team and year
National team	Year	Apps	Goals
France	1952	5	2
France	1953	6	3
France	1954	6	4
France	1955	6	4
France	1956	1	0
France	1957	0	0
France	1958	7	4
France	1959	4	0
France	1960	3	1
France	1961	3	0
France	1962	4	0
Total		45	18

Scores and results list France's goal tally first, score column indicates score after each Kopa goal.

List of international goals scored by Raymond Kopa
No.	Date	Venue	Opponent	Score	Result	Competition
1	11 November 1952	Stade Olympique Yves-du-Manoir, Paris, France	Northern Ireland	2–0	3–1	Friendly
2	11 November 1952	Stade Olympique Yves-du-Manoir, Paris, France	Northern Ireland	3–1	3–1	Friendly
3	14 May 1953	Stade Olympique Yves-du-Manoir, Paris, France	Wales	2–1	6–1	Friendly
4	14 May 1953	Stade Olympique Yves-du-Manoir, Paris, France	Wales	4–1	6–1	Friendly
5	20 September 1953	Stade Josy Barthel, Luxembourg, Luxembourg	Luxembourg	2–1	6–1	1954 FIFA World Cup qualification
6	30 May 1954	Stade Heysel, Brussels, Belgium	Belgium	3–3	3–3	Friendly
7	19 June 1954	Charmilles Stadium, Geneva, Switzerland	Mexico	3–2	3–2	1954 FIFA World Cup
8	11 November 1954	Stade Olympique Yves-du-Manoir, Paris, France	Belgium	1–2	2–2	Friendly
9	11 November 1954	Stade Olympique Yves-du-Manoir, Paris, France	Belgium	2–2	2–2	Friendly
10	17 March 1955	Estadio Chamartín, Madrid, Spain	Spain	1–1	2–1	Friendly
11	15 May 1955	Stade Olympique Yves-du-Manoir, Paris, France	England	1–0	1–0	Friendly
12	9 October 1955	St. Jakob Stadium, Basel, Switzerland	Switzerland	1–0	2–1	Friendly
13	23 October 1955	Dinamo Stadium, Moscow, Soviet Union	Soviet Union	1–0	2–2	Friendly
14	8 June 1958	Idrottsparken, Norrköping, Sweden	Paraguay	6–3	7–3	1958 FIFA World Cup
15	15 June 1958	Eyravallen, Örebro, Sweden	Scotland	1–0	2–1	1958 FIFA World Cup
16	26 June 1958	Ullevi, Gothenburg, Sweden	West Germany	2–1	6–3	1958 FIFA World Cup
17	1 October 1958	Parc des Princes, Paris, France	Greece	1–0	7–1	1960 European Nations' Cup qualifying
18	27 March 1960	Praterstadion, Vienna, Austria	Austria	4–2	4–2	1960 European Nations' Cup qualifying

== Honours ==
Reims

- Division 1: 1952–53, 1954–55, 1959–60, 1961–62
- Coupe Charles Drago: 1954
- Latin Cup: 1953; runner-up 1955
- Division 2: 1965–66
- European Cup runner-up: 1955–56

Real Madrid

- La Liga: 1956–57, 1957–58
- European Cup: 1956–57, 1957–58, 1958–59
- Latin Cup: 1957

France

- FIFA World Cup third place: 1958

Individual

- Ballon d'Or: 1958; runner-up 1959; third place 1956, 1957 (Note: Shared with Duncan Edwards)
- FIFA World Cup All-Star Team: 1958
- Etoile d'Or: 1960
- French Player of the Year: 1960
- FIFA XI: 1963
- World Soccer World XI: 1963
- World Soccer: The 100 Greatest Footballers of All Time
- Golden Foot: 2006, as a football legend
- UEFA President's Award: 2010
- FIFA 100
- 3rd French Player of the Century

Orders

- Chevalier of the Légion d'honneur: 1970
- Officier of the Légion d'honneur: 2007
