= 1959–60 French Division 1 =

22nd season of French Division 1

Division Nationale
- Season: 1959–60

Stade de Reims won Division 1 season 1959/1960 of the French Association Football League with 60 points.

== Participating teams ==
- Angers SCO
- Bordeaux
- Le Havre AC
- RC Lens
- Limoges FC
- Olympique Lyonnais
- AS Monaco
- OGC Nice
- Nîmes Olympique
- RC Paris
- Stade de Reims
- Stade Rennais UC
- AS Saint-Etienne
- UA Sedan-Torcy
- FC Sochaux-Montbéliard
- Stade Français FC
- RC Strasbourg
- SC Toulon
- Toulouse FC
- US Valenciennes-Anzin
Location of teams in 1959–60 Division 1

== Final table ==
Pos	Team	Pld	W	D	L	GF	GA	GAv	Pts	Qualification or relegation
1	Reims (C)	38	26	8	4	109	46	2.370	60	Qualification to European Cup preliminary round
2	Nîmes	38	22	9	7	78	43	1.814	53	
3	Racing Paris	38	19	11	8	118	56	2.107	49	
4	Monaco	38	19	7	12	70	45	1.556	45	
5	Toulouse	38	19	6	13	74	61	1.213	44	
6	Lens	38	18	8	12	55	57	0.965	44	
7	Le Havre	38	15	12	11	63	68	0.926	42	
8	Valenciennes	38	16	8	14	65	60	1.083	40	
9	Nice	38	17	6	15	71	74	0.959	40	
10	Limoges	38	14	10	14	46	46	1.000	38	
11	Sedan	38	12	13	13	62	62	1.000	37	
12	Saint-Étienne	38	12	12	14	62	65	0.954	36	
13	Angers	38	13	10	15	60	67	0.896	36	
14	Stade Français	38	14	6	18	59	70	0.843	34	
15	Rennes	38	13	7	18	47	59	0.797	33	
16	Lyon	38	10	11	17	41	52	0.788	31	Invited to Inter-Cities Fairs Cup
17	Sochaux (R)	38	8	11	19	40	67	0.597	27	Relegation to French Division 2
18	Strasbourg (R)	38	9	7	22	55	92	0.598	25	Relegation to French Division 2
19	Toulon (R)	38	9	7	22	50	85	0.588	25	Relegation to French Division 2
20	Bordeaux (R)	38	7	7	24	52	102	0.510	21	Relegation to French Division 2

Rules for classification: Victory: 2 points, Draw: 1 point, Defeat: 0 points
(C) Champions; (R) Relegated

Promoted from Division 2, who will play in Division 1 season 1960/1961

- FC Grenoble: Champion of Division 2
- FC Nancy: runner-up of Division 2
- FC Rouen: Third place
- AS Troyes-Savinienne: Fourth place

== Results ==
Home \ Away	ANG	BOR	LHA	RCL	LFC	OL	ASM	NIC	NMS	RCP	REI	REN	STE	SED	SOC	SFF	RCS	SCT	TOU	VAL
Angers		4–1	4–2	4–1	1–0	1–1	1–1	2–2	0–0	0–0	6–1	2–0	3–3	0–0	1–0	3–0	3–1	3–2	2–0	1–2
Bordeaux	1–1		0–1	2–3	2–1	2–2	4–2	0–3	1–3	1–5	2–1	0–1	0–0	1–4	6–4	3–3	0–1	2–1	3–5	3–7
Le Havre	5–0	2–0		3–1	2–0	1–2	2–0	3–1	0–3	2–2	2–2	4–2	0–0	3–3	2–2	1–2	2–1	2–0	0–3	3–2
Lens	4–2	3–1	1–1		0–0	1–0	1–2	1–0	3–1	3–2	2–5	1–0	0–0	1–1	3–1	3–2	2–1	6–2	4–0	1–0
Limoges	2–0	3–0	0–0	1–2		0–1	0–2	2–1	2–1	1–0	2–2	1–2	2–1	2–2	1–0	1–0	8–0	2–0	2–1	1–1
Lyon	2–0	2–2	1–1	0–1	1–0		0–4	0–2	1–2	0–0	0–1	0–0	0–0	0–1	3–1	0–0	3–2	1–2	1–2	3–0
Monaco	2–1	5–0	0–1	2–1	0–0	4–1		2–0	0–1	3–3	2–2	5–0	1–1	2–1	1–0	3–0	4–2	1–3	3–0	1–0
Nice	1–5	2–1	2–2	3–0	3–3	2–1	3–2		2–1	2–5	1–4	3–1	2–0	3–0	3–0	1–3	2–3	4–2	1–0	1–1
Nîmes	1–1	4–0	4–1	0–0	2–0	2–2	5–1	5–1		0–2	0–3	3–0	2–0	2–0	2–1	3–1	2–1	4–1	2–2	3–0
Racing Paris	4–1	6–1	9–0	3–0	4–0	4–0	1–1	1–2	1–2		3–3	0–2	4–0	2–3	8–0	1–1	2–2	7–1	1–3	6–4
Reims	6–0	8–2	8–2	5–1	1–0	3–0	2–1	2–2	1–2	0–0		2–1	3–0	1–0	4–1	4–0	5–0	3–0	5–2	2–1
Rennes	2–3	1–0	2–2	2–0	0–2	1–2	1–2	3–1	1–1	3–2	0–1		0–0	1–2	0–1	2–3	4–0	3–3	1–0	2–1
Saint-Étienne	1–1	4–2	3–1	6–0	2–0	2–1	1–0	4–1	2–2	3–4	2–5	2–1		3–3	0–3	1–1	7–3	3–1	3–3	3–1
Sedan	2–0	2–3	0–3	2–2	0–0	0–0	2–1	2–0	2–3	1–4	1–3	2–0	3–1		2–1	2–1	2–2	1–2	3–4	2–2
Sochaux	2–0	0–0	0–0	1–0	0–0	1–3	1–0	1–2	1–1	3–6	1–2	2–2	2–0	0–0		3–2	1–1	1–2	0–2	0–0
Stade Français	2–0	0–2	0–1	0–1	2–3	2–1	3–2	2–3	0–0	3–3	0–3	1–2	3–2	1–5	2–1		2–1	3–1	3–1	1–2
Strasbourg	4–2	2–1	1–2	0–0	1–3	2–1	0–2	1–4	1–3	2–5	1–3	1–1	3–0	3–3	0–1	2–5		3–2	2–0	0–0
Toulon	1–0	2–0	3–3	1–1	3–1	1–1	0–3	1–1	3–2	1–3	1–1	0–1	0–1	2–1	2–2	1–2	1–4		0–1	1–2
Toulouse	5–1	2–1	2–1	1–0	6–0	1–0	1–1	4–1	2–3	1–1	2–2	1–2	2–1	1–1	3–0	1–3	2–1	3–0		2–1
Valenciennes	3–1	2–2	2–0	0–1	0–0	1–4	0–2	4–3	3–1	1–4	3–0	2–0	2–0	2–1	1–1	1–0	2–0	3–1	5–3	

Legend: Blue = home team win; Yellow = draw; Red = away team win.

== Top goalscorers ==
Rank	Player	Club	Goals
1	(France) Just Fontaine	Reims	28
2	(France) Thadée Cisowski	Racing Paris	27
3	(France) Ginès Liron	Saint-Étienne	23
4	(Morocco) Hassan Akesbi	Nîmes	22
4	(France) Bernard Rahis	Nîmes	22
4	(Netherlands) Petrus Van Rhijn	Stade Français	22
4	(France) (Hungary) Joseph Ujlaki	Racing Paris	22
8	(France) Laurent Robuschi	Bordeaux	20
9	(France) Roger Piantoni	Reims	18
10	(France) (Ivory Coast) Jean Topka	Racing Paris	17
10	(France) Ernie Schultz	Toulouse FC	17

== Attendances ==
#	Club	Average
1	Racing	16,804
2	Reims	11,554
3	Stade français	10,575
4	Le Havre	10,531
5	Stade rennais	10,004
6	Saint-Étienne	9,698
7	Girondins	9,650
8	Nice	9,483
9	Limoges	9,463
10	Nîmes	8,979
11	Olympique lyonnais	8,325
12	Toulouse	8,234
13	Lens	7,743
14	Toulon	7,622
15	Valenciennes	7,540
16	Strasbourg	7,075
17	Angers	6,604
18	Sochaux	5,490
19	Sedan	4,301
20	Monaco	3,081
