= Robert Mouynet =

French footballer (1930–2026)

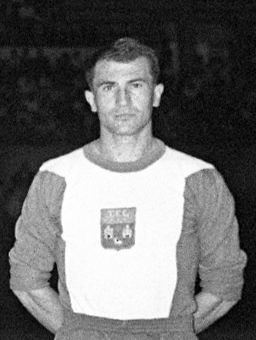
- Mouynet with Toulouse in 1961

Personal information
- Date of birth: 25 March 1930
- Place of birth: Toulouse, France
- Date of death: 18 August 2026 (aged 96)
- Place of death: Toulouse, France
- Height: 1.79 m (5 ft 10 in)
- Position: Defender

Senior career*
Years	Team	Apps	(Gls)
1949–1953	Toulouse	65	(0)
1953–1955	Cannes	75	(3)
1955–1959	Lyon	147	(5)
1959–1963	Toulouse	119	(1)
Total		406	(9)

International career
1958	France		
Medal record
Representing France
FIFA World Cup
Third place	1958 Sweden
- * Club domestic league appearances and goals

Robert Mouynet (25 March 1930 – 19 August 2026) was a French footballer who played as a defender. He was the last surviving player of the French squad which finished third at the 1958 FIFA World Cup. However, he never won a cap for the France national team. Mouynet died on 19 August 2026, at the age of 96.

== Club career ==
- 1954–1959: Lyon
- 1959–1961: Toulouse
