= Þórður Jónsson =

Icelandic footballer (1934–2018)

Personal information
- Date of birth: 29 November 1934
- Date of death: 29 October 2018 (aged 83)
- Position: Forward

Senior career*
Years	Team	Apps	(Gls)
- ÍA

International career
1955–1962	Iceland	13	(2)
- * Club domestic league appearances and goals

Þórður Jónsson (29 November 1934 – 29 October 2018) was an Icelandic footballer who played as a forward for ÍA. He made 13 appearances for the Iceland national team from 1955 to 1962.

== International goals ==
No.	Date	Venue	Opponent	Score	Result	Competition
1.	1 September 1957	Reykjavík, Iceland	France	1–4	1–5	1958 FIFA World Cup qualification
2.	4 September 1957	Reykjavík, Iceland	Belgium	2–3	2–5	1958 FIFA World Cup qualification
