= Helgi Daníelsson (footballer, born 1933) =

Icelandic footballer (1933–2014)

Personal information
- Date of birth: 16 April 1933
- Place of birth: Akranes, Kingdom of Iceland
- Date of death: 1 May 2018 (aged 85)
- Place of death: Akranes, Iceland
- Position: Goalkeeper

Senior career*
Years	Team	Apps	(Gls)
1950	ÍA		
1951–1955	Valur		
1956–1965	ÍA		

International career
1953–1965	Iceland	25	(0)
- * Club domestic league appearances and goals

Helgi Biering Daníelsson (16 April 1933 – 1 May 2014) was an Icelandic footballer who played as a goalkeeper. He was part of the Icelandic national team between 1953 and 1965, playing 25 matches. He won the Icelandic championship three times as a member of Íþróttabandalag Akraness.

== See also ==
- List of Iceland international footballers
