= Richard Orlans =

Belgian football coach and former player

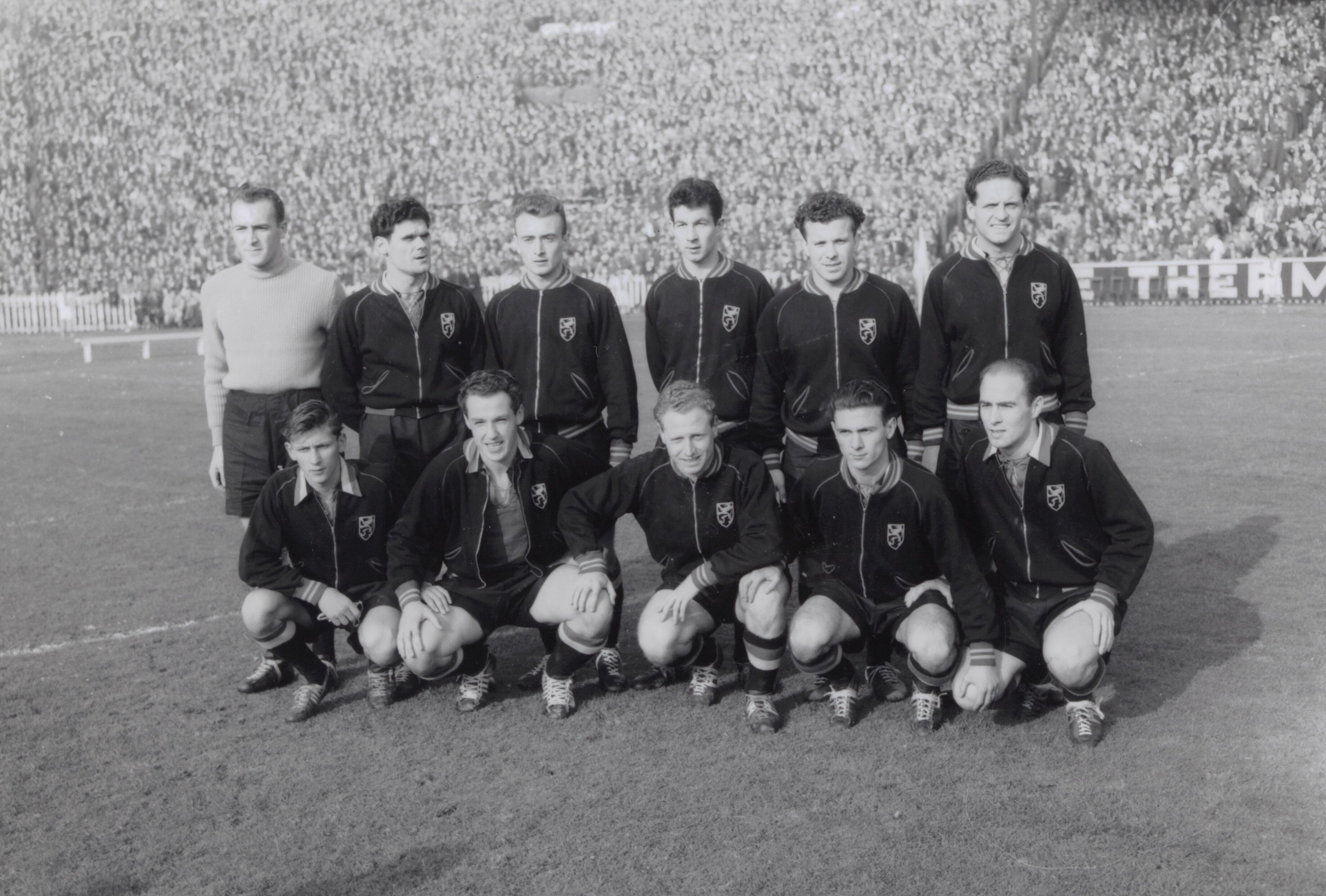
- Orlans with Belgium in 1956

Personal information
- Full name: Richard Jérome Orlans
- Date of birth: 6 October 1931 (age 95)
- Place of birth: Ghent, Belgium
- Position: Left winger

Youth career
- 1946–1949: ARA La Gantoise

Senior career*
Years	Team	Apps	(Gls)
1949–1961	ARA La Gantoise		
1961–1962	Cercle Brugge		
1962–1964	Anderlecht		
1964–1969	Zwevegem Sport		
1969–1971	Roeselare		

International career
1955–1958	Belgium	21	(5)

Managerial career
- 1964–1969: Zwevegem Sport (player-coach)
- 1969–1971: Roeselare (player-coach)
- 1971–1972: AS Oostende
- 1972: Mouscron
- 1972–1974: Zwevegem Sport (player-coach)
- 1974–1976: K.A.A. Gent
- 1976–1978: RRC Gent
- 1982: Zaïre
- * Club domestic league appearances and goals

Richard Jérome Orlans (born 6 October 1931) is a Belgian former footballer who played as a midfielder. He played in the Belgian First Division for the teams of K.A.A. Gent, Cercle Brugge and R.S.C. Anderlecht and played 21 games for the national team of Belgium. After his playing career, he was also a coach.

He is also the father of football manager Patrick Orlans.

== Career ==
=== First Division ===
Born in Ghent, Orlans joined K.A.A. Gent in 1946 at the age of 15 and played in all of the youth teams. In 1949 he debuted as a midfielder in the first team of the team. He acquired a place in the permanent team in the 1950–51 season and finished in second position in the league in 1955 and three times in third position (1954, 1957 and 1958). He remained a player until 1961.

In between 1955 and 1958, the strongest era of K.A.A. Gent, Orlans played 21 games for the Belgium national team and scored five goals overall. In the same year, Orlans finished second in the Belgian Golden Shoe vote, honouring the best player in competition. The winner was Vic Mees.

In 1961 Orlans went to the newly promoted team of Cercle Brugge and managed to ensure remaining in the Belgian First Division. He played a good season and was selected for the national team two more times, but he never played for the team.

The strong performances of Orlans for Cercle caught the eye of coach Sinibaldi of R.S.C. Anderlecht, and Orlans transferred to the Brussels team. In his first season, Orlans played a strong European campaign. In the 1962–63 European Cup he and Anderlecht reached the quarterfinals setting aside, among others, Real Madrid. In the next season, he was Belgian champion with the team. After this, he ended his time in the First Division. He played 320 games all together and scored 50 goals.

=== Lower levels ===
Later on, Orlans played at a lower level for the team of SK Roeselare in the Third Division (1964–1965). He performed as a player-coach for the team of Zwevegem Sport in the Third Division (1965–1969) and afterwards again at SK Roeselare (1969–71).

After he obtained his coaching certificate at the coaching school at the Heizel in 1970, Orlans became a coach at AS Oostende in the Belgian Second Division (1971–1972), a job he did not complete, as he resigned. He left for Excelsior Moeskroen but could not prevent relegation to the Belgian Fourth Division. Orlans returned to Zwevegem Sport in the Fourth Division and acted as player-coach for two more seasons. (1972–1974)

In 1974, Orlans became the coach of K.A.A. Gent, which in the meantime had fallen to the Belgian Third Division. In his first season, he helped the club win promotion to the Second Division, and he stayed for one year longer. In 1976 Orlans applied to succeed the national coach Raymond Goethals, but it was Guy Thys who became the new coach of the national team. After this, Orlans was coach of RRC Gent for two more seasons in the Fourth Division, and he shortly became the national coach of Zaire in 1982.
