= Hans Cieslarczyk =

German footballer and manager (1937–2020)

Personal information
- Date of birth: 3 May 1937
- Place of birth: Herne, Germany
- Date of death: 10 June 2020 (aged 83)
- Place of death: Offenburg, Germany
- Height: 1.69 m (5 ft 7 in)
- Position: Striker

Senior career*
Years	Team	Apps	(Gls)
1955–1958	SV Sodingen	74	(20)
1958–1962	Borussia Dortmund	35	(6)
1962–1963	Dortmund 95		
1963–1964	Westfalia Herne	32	(9)
1964–1968	Karlsruher SC	66	(18)

International career
1957	West Germany U23	2	(1)
1957–1958	West Germany	7	(3)
1959	West Germany B	1	(0)

Managerial career
- 1975–1977: SpVgg Fürth
- 1977–1978: Stuttgarter Kickers
- 1978: 1. FC Saarbrücken
- 1978–1979: FC Augsburg
- 1979–1980: Offenburger FV
- 1980–1981: ESV Ingolstadt
- * Club domestic league appearances and goals

Hans Cieslarczyk (3 May 1937 – 10 June 2020) was a German football player and coach.

During his club career, he played for SV Sodingen, Borussia Dortmund, Westfalia Herne, and Karlsruher SC. He also played seven times for the Germany national football team, scoring three goals, and participated in the 1958 FIFA World Cup.
