= Maryan Wisniewski =

French footballer (1937–2022)

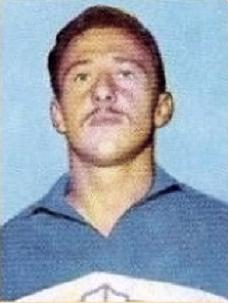
- Wisniewski with Grenoble in 1970

Personal information
- Full name: Marian Wisniewski
- Date of birth: 1 February 1937
- Place of birth: Calonne-Ricouart, France
- Date of death: 3 March 2022 (aged 85)
- Place of death: Carpentras, France
- Height: 1.75 m (5 ft 9 in)
- Position: Striker

Youth career
- US Auchel

Senior career*
Years	Team	Apps	(Gls)
1953–1963	Lens	277	(93)
1963–1964	Sampdoria	21	(4)
1964–1966	Saint-Étienne	46	(12)
1966–1969	Sochaux	86	(8)
1969–1970	Grenoble	27	(4)
Total		457	(121)

International career
1955–1963	France	33	(12)
Medal record
Representing France
FIFA World Cup
Third place	1958
- * Club domestic league appearances and goals

Marian Wisniewski (1 February 1937 – 3 March 2022), known as Maryan Wisniewski, was a French footballer who played as a forward.

== Life and career ==
Marian Wisniewski was born on 1 February 1937 in Calonne-Ricouart, Pas-de-Calais. He earned 33 caps and scored 12 goals for the France national team, and played in the 1958 FIFA World Cup when France finished third. He made his international debut on 3 April 1955 at the age of 18 years, 2 months, and 2 days.

Wisniewski died on 3 March 2022, at the age of 85, in Carpentras, Vaucluse. His grandnephew Jonathan Wisniewski is a former professional rugby union player.
