= Said Brahimi =

Algerian footballer (1931-1997)

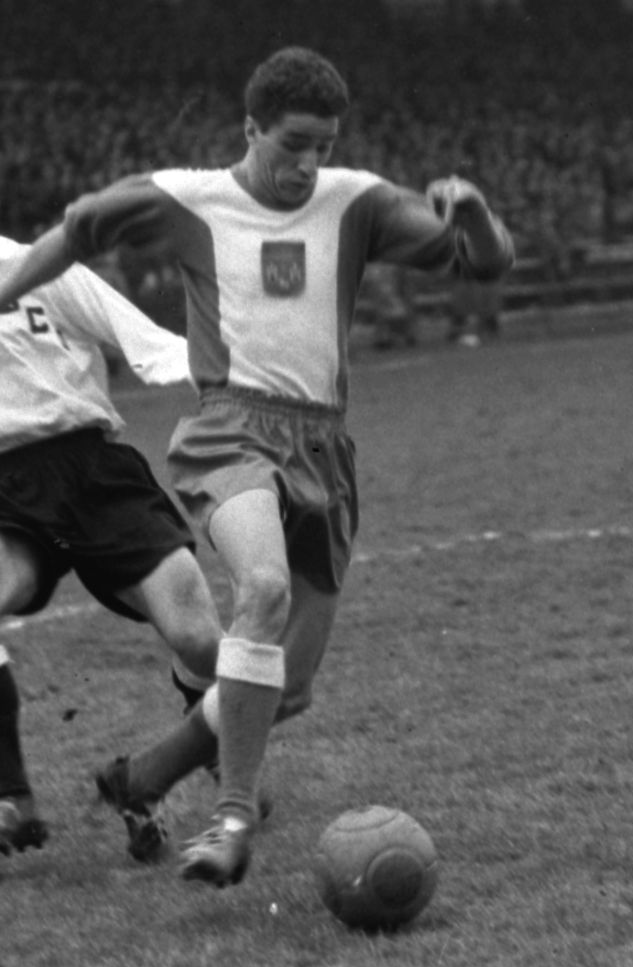

Personal information
- Date of birth: 17 March 1931
- Place of birth: Bône, French Algeria _{(now Annaba, Algeria)}
- Date of death: 27 December 1997 (aged 66)
- Place of death: Annaba, Algeria
- Position: Striker

Senior career*
Years	Team	Apps	(Gls)
1950–1954	JAC Bône	–	(–)
1954–1955	FC Sète	–	(–)
1956–1958	Toulouse	72	(11)

International career
1957	France	2	(1)
1958–1959	FLN	40	(–)

Managerial career
- 1959–1965: JSM Skikda
- 1965–: Al-Ahly SC
- AC Derna
- 1990: USM Annaba
- 1991: MC Oran
- * Club domestic league appearances and goals

Said Brahimi (17 March 1931 – 27 December 1997) was an Algerian footballer.

== International goals ==
Scores and results list. France's goal tally first.

#	Date	Venue	Opponent	Score	Result	Competition
1.	2 June 1957	Stade Marcel Saupin, Nantes	Iceland	6–0	8–0	1958 FIFA World Cup Qualifying
