= Célestin Oliver =

French footballer (1930–2011)

Personal information
- Date of birth: 12 July 1930
- Place of birth: Mostaganem, French Algeria
- Date of death: 5 June 2011 (aged 80)
- Place of death: Marseille, France
- Position: Striker

Senior career*
Years	Team	Apps	(Gls)
1950–1953	IS Mostaganem		
1953–1958	Sedan	168	(85)
1958–1960	Marseille	73	(32)
1960–1962	Angers	68	(9)
1962–1964	Toulon	63	(15)

International career
1953–1958	France	5	(3)

Managerial career
- 1966–1967: Miramas
- 1967–1972: Caen
- 1972–1973: Reims
- 1974–1975: Boulogne
- 1978–1979: Toulon
Medal record
Representing France
FIFA World Cup
Third place	1958 Sweden
- * Club domestic league appearances and goals

Célestin Oliver (12 July 1930 – 5 June 2011) was a French footballer who played as a striker. He was part of the France national team during the 1952 Summer Olympics and the 1958 FIFA World Cup tournaments.

In 1979, he created an education academy in Marseille, where he trained Christophe Galtier, Eric Cantona, Benjamin Gavanon, and Cédric Carrasso.

== Honours ==
Sedan

- Coupe de France: 1955–56

France

- FIFA World Cup third place: 1958
