= Denis Houf =

Belgian footballer

- Houf with Standard Liège.

Personal information
- Date of birth: 16 February 1932
- Place of birth: Fléron, Belgium
- Date of death: 7 December 2012 (aged 80)
- Place of death: Liège, Belgium
- Height: 1.59 m (5 ft 2 1/2 in)
- Position: Midfielder

Senior career*
Years	Team	Apps	(Gls)
1948–1964	Standard Liège	352	(99)

International career
1954–1961	Belgium	26	(5)
- * Club domestic league appearances and goals

Denis Houf (16 February 1932 – 7 December 2012) was a Belgian international footballer who played as a midfielder.

== Career ==
Born in Fléron, Houf played club football for Standard Liège.

Houf earned a total of 26 caps for Belgium between 1954 and 1961, and participated at the 1954 FIFA World Cup.

Houf died on 7 December 2012 in Liège.

== Honours ==
=== Club ===
Standard Liège

- Belgian First Division: 1957-58, 1960-61, 1962-63, Runners-up:1961-62
- Belgian Cup: 1953–54

=== Individual ===
- Belgian Silver Shoe: 1956
- Belgian Bronze Shoe: 1961
