= Joseph Ujlaki =

French-Hungarian footballer (1929-2006)

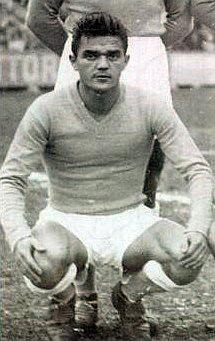
- Ujlaki in 1951

Personal information
- Date of birth: 10 August 1929
- Place of birth: Budapest, Hungary
- Date of death: 13 February 2006 (aged 76)
- Place of death: Sète, France
- Position: Right winger

Youth career
- –1947: Újpesti Dózsa

Senior career*
Years	Team	Apps	(Gls)
1947–1948	Stade Français	90	(58)
1948–1950	Sète	51	(33)
1950–1953	Nîmes	77	(49)
1953–1958	Nice	145	(93)
1958–1964	RC Paris	190	(122)
1964–1965	Metz	17	(7)
1965–1966	AS Aixoise	26	(17)
Total		596	(379)

International career
1952–1960	France	21	(10)
- * Club domestic league appearances and goals

Joseph Ujlaki (Hungarian: Újlaki József) (10 August 1929 – 13 February 2006) was a French-Hungarian footballer who was one of the best right wingers in Division 1 (190 goals) in the 1950s and 1960s.

He acquired French nationality by naturalization on 5 September 1952.

== Honours ==
Nice

- Division 1: 1956
- Coupe de France: 1954
