= Maurice Willems =

Belgian footballer (1929–1986)

- Willems for Belgium in 1956

Personal information
- Date of birth: 24 September 1929
- Place of birth: Belgium
- Date of death: 4 December 1986 (aged 57)
- Position: Striker

Senior career*
Years	Team	Apps	(Gls)
1952–1962	K.A.A. Gent	210	(157)
1962–1963	Racing Club Brussel		
1963–1965	K.R.C. Gent-Zeehaven		
1965–1967	SK Deinze		
Total		210	(157)

International career
1956–1957	Belgium	3	(4)
- * Club domestic league appearances and goals

Maurice Willems (24 September 1929 – 4 December 1986) was a Belgian football player who finished top scorer of the Belgian First Division with 35 goals in 1957.

As a center forward he scored a total of 185 goals for Gent, making him their all-time top goal scorer . He is also one of the five players from K.A.A. Gent who became the national top scorer.

He played 3 times with the Belgium national team between 1956 and 1957. Willems made his international debut on 14 October 1956 in a 2–3 friendly defeat to the Netherlands and he scored.

Born on 24 September 1929, he died on 4 December 1986, at the age of 57.

== Honours ==
=== Club ===
==== KAA Gent ====
- Belgian First Division runners-up: 1954–55

=== Individual ===
- Belgian First Division top scorer: 1956–57 (35 goals)
