= René Dereuddre =

French footballer (1930-2008)

Personal information
- Date of birth: 22 June 1930
- Place of birth: Bully-les-Mines, France
- Date of death: 16 April 2008 (aged 77)
- Place of death: Le Mans, France
- Position: Midfielder

Youth career
- 1946–1950: ES Bully

Senior career*
Years	Team	Apps	(Gls)
1950–1953	CO Roubaix-Tourcoing	68	(18)
1953–1957	Toulouse	150	(48)
1957–1958	Lens	30	(6)
1958–1959	Angers	47	(10)
1959–1961	Nantes	56	(6)
1961–1964	Grenoble	94	(8)
1964–1967	Le Mans		

International career
1954–1957	France	6	(1)

Managerial career
- 1964–1976: Le Mans
- * Club domestic league appearances and goals

René Dereuddre (22 June 1930 – 16 April 2008) was a French footballer who played midfielder.

He played for CO Roubaix-Tourcoing, Toulouse FC, RC Lens, Angers SCO, FC Nantes, FC Grenoble and US Le Mans. He coached US Le Mans.
