= Just Fontaine =

French footballer (1933–2023)

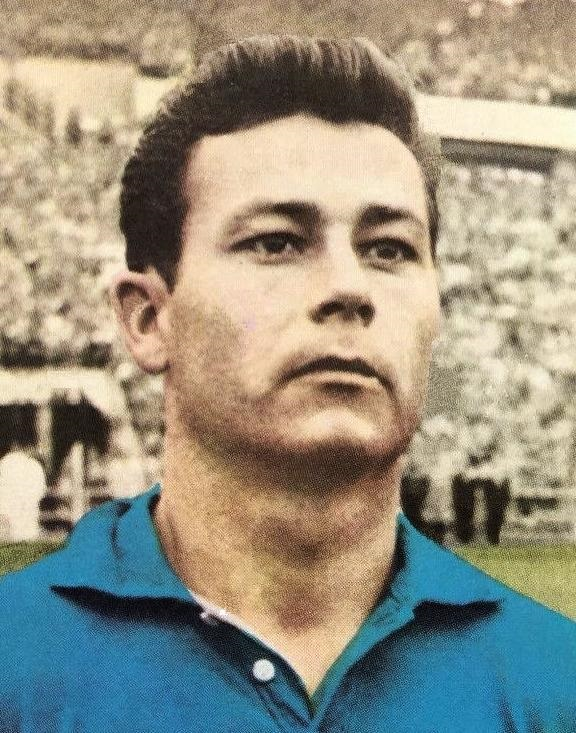
- Fontaine at the 1958 FIFA World Cup

Personal information
- Full name: Just Louis Fontaine
- Date of birth: 18 August 1933
- Place of birth: Marrakesh, French Morocco
- Date of death: 28 February 2023 (aged 89)
- Place of death: Toulouse, France
- Height: 1.74 m (5 ft 9 in)
- Position: Striker

Senior career*
Years	Team	Apps	(Gls)
1950–1953	US Marocaine	48	(62)
1953–1956	Nice	69	(42)
1956–1962	Reims	131	(122)
Total		248	(226)

International career
1953–1960	France	21	(30)

Managerial career
- 1967: France
- 1968–1969: Luchon
- 1973–1976: Paris Saint-Germain
- 1978–1979: Toulouse
- 1979–1981: Morocco
Medal record
Men's football
Representing France (as player)
FIFA World Cup
Third place	1958
Representing Morocco (as manager)
Africa Cup of Nations
Third place	1980
- * Club domestic league appearances and goals

Just Louis Fontaine (French pronunciation: [ʒyst fɔ̃.tɛn]; 18 August 1933 – 28 February 2023) was a French professional footballer who played as a striker. He holds the record for the most goals scored in a single FIFA World Cup, with thirteen in six matches at the 1958 tournament.

In March 2004, Pelé named him one of his 125 Greatest Living Footballers at a FIFA Awards Ceremony.

== Early life and football career ==
Born in Marrakesh, French Morocco, to a French father and a Spanish mother, Fontaine moved to Casablanca, where he attended the Lycée Lyautey.

Fontaine began his amateur career at US Marocaine, where he played from 1950 to 1953. Nice recruited him in 1953 and he went on to score 44 goals in three seasons for the club. In 1956, he moved to Stade de Reims, where he teamed up with Raymond Kopa from the 1959–60 season. Fontaine scored 121 goals in six seasons at Stade de Reims. In total, Fontaine scored 165 goals in 200 matches in the Division 1 and won the championship twice (1958 and 1960). He also took part in the team that got to the 1958–59 European Cup final against Real Madrid, being that season's top scorer with ten goals.

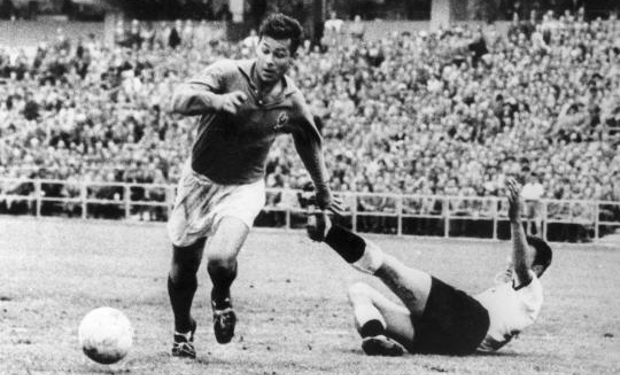
Fontaine playing for France at the 1958 FIFA World Cup.

Wearing the blue shirt of France, Fontaine has an even more impressive record. On his debut on 17 December 1953, Fontaine scored a hat trick as France defeated Luxembourg 8–0. In seven years, he scored 30 goals in 21 matches. In the 1958 FIFA World Cup, he scored 13 goals in just six matches – a feat that included putting four past defending champions West Germany in the third place playoff. It is also the highest number of goals scored by a player at a single World Cup tournament. As of 2026, he is the seventh-top scorer in FIFA World Cup history, with each of the six ahead of him—Gerd Müller (14 goals), Harry Kane (14 goals), Ronaldo (15 goals), Miroslav Klose (16 goals), Lionel Messi (21 goals), and Kylian Mbappé (22 goals)— having played in at least two tournaments.

Fontaine played his last match in July 1962, being forced to retire early (28 years and 11 months old) because of a recurring leg injury. He briefly managed the France national team in 1967, but was replaced after only two friendly games, which ended in defeats. As coach of Morocco, he led the Atlas Lions to a third place finish in the 1980 African Cup of Nations, overseeing the emergence of such players as Badou Zaki, Mohammed Timoumi and Aziz Bouderbala. Morocco reached the final stage of 1982 World Cup qualification but were beaten by Cameroon. As sporting director of Paris Saint-Germain, he managed to help promote the club to the first division.

== After retirement ==
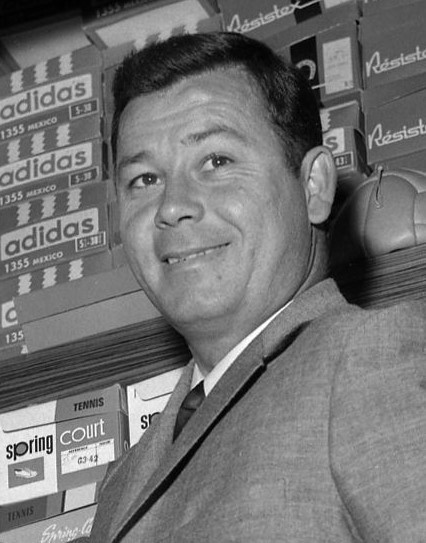
Fontaine in 1966

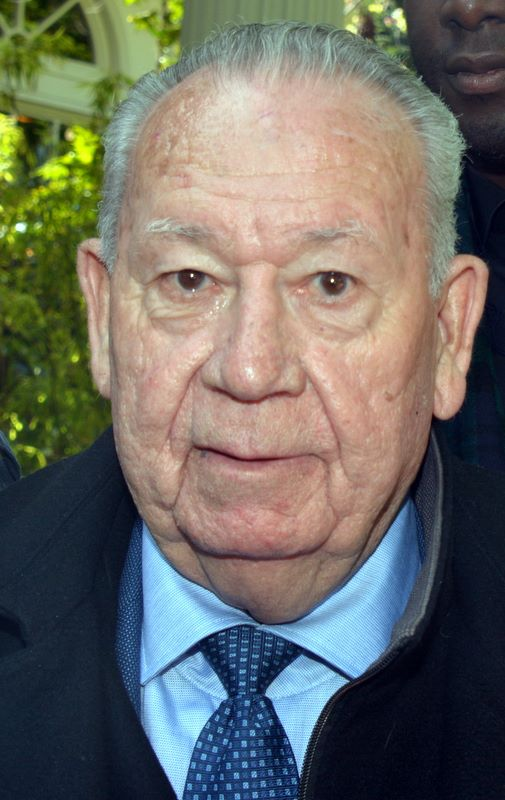
Fontaine in 2016

Fontaine was named by Pelé as one of the 125 greatest living footballers in March 2004. He was chosen as the best French player of the last 60 years by the French Football Federation in the UEFA Jubilee Awards in November 2003. With Eugène N'Jo Léa he founded the National Union of Professional Football Players in 1961. He criticised the performance of the French team in the 2010 World Cup in South Africa, particularly on the lackluster play of the forwards.

For over 60 years, Fontaine lived in Toulouse, where he owned two Lacoste shops and, in his own words, spent his days playing belote and watching football on television. He died in Toulouse on 28 February 2023 at the age of 89.

== Career statistics ==
=== Club ===
Appearances and goals by club, season and competition
Club	Season	League			Cup		Continental		Other		Total	
Club	Season	Division	Apps	Goals	Apps	Goals	Apps	Goals	Apps	Goals	Apps	Goals
US Marocaine	1950–51	Moroccan Football League	16	23	—		—		—		16	23
US Marocaine	1951–52	Moroccan Football League	10	17	—		—		—		10	17
US Marocaine	1952–53	Moroccan Football League	22	22	—		—		—		22	22
US Marocaine	Total		48	62	—		—		—		48	62
Nice	1953–54	Division 1	24	17	7	3	—		—		31	20
Nice	1954–55	Division 1	28	20	4	2	—		—		32	22
Nice	1955–56	Division 1	17	5	3	4	—		1 (Note: Appearance in Challenge des Champions)	0	21	9
Nice	Total		69	42	14	9	—		1	0	84	51
Reims	1956–57	Division 1	31	30	1	1	—		—		32	31
Reims	1957–58	Division 1	26	34	6	5	—		—		32	39
Reims	1958–59	Division 1	32	24	2	2	7 (Note: Appearances in European Cup)	10	1 (Note: Appearance in Coupe Charles Drago)	0	42	36
Reims	1959–60	Division 1	28	28	2	2	—		—		30	30
Reims	1960–61	Division 1	7	4	0	0	1	0	—		8	4
Reims	1961–62	Division 1	7	2	1	3	—		—		8	5
Reims	Total		131	122	12	13	8	10	1	0	152	145
Career total			248	226	26	22	8	10	2	0	284	258

=== International ===
Appearances and goals by national team and year
National team	Year	Apps	Goals
France	1953	1	3
France	1954	0	0
France	1955	0	0
France	1956	1	0
France	1957	1	0
France	1958	12	18
France	1959	4	7
France	1960	2	2
Total		21	30

Scores and results list France's goal tally first, score column indicates score after each Fontaine goal

List of international goals scored by Just Fontaine
No.	Date	Venue	Cap	Opponent	Score	Result	Competition
1	17 December 1953	Parc des Princes, Paris, France	1	Luxembourg	4–0	8–0	1954 FIFA World Cup qualification
2	17 December 1953	Parc des Princes, Paris, France	1	Luxembourg	6–0	8–0	1954 FIFA World Cup qualification
3	17 December 1953	Parc des Princes, Paris, France	1	Luxembourg	7–0	8–0	1954 FIFA World Cup qualification
4	13 March 1958	Parc des Princes, Paris, France	4	Spain	1–1	2–2	Friendly
5	8 June 1958	Idrottsparken, Norrköping, Sweden	6	Paraguay	1–1	7–3	1958 FIFA World Cup
6	8 June 1958	Idrottsparken, Norrköping, Sweden	6	Paraguay	2–1	7–3	1958 FIFA World Cup
7	8 June 1958	Idrottsparken, Norrköping, Sweden	6	Paraguay	5–3	7–3	1958 FIFA World Cup
8	11 June 1958	Arosvallen, Västerås, Sweden	7	Yugoslavia	1–0	2–3	1958 FIFA World Cup
9	11 June 1958	Arosvallen, Västerås, Sweden	7	Yugoslavia	2–2	2–3	1958 FIFA World Cup
10	15 June 1958	Eyravallen, Örebro, Sweden	8	Scotland	2–0	2–1	1958 FIFA World Cup
11	19 June 1958	Idrottsparken, Norrköping, Sweden	9	Northern Ireland	2–0	4–0	1958 FIFA World Cup
12	19 June 1958	Idrottsparken, Norrköping, Sweden	9	Northern Ireland	3–0	4–0	1958 FIFA World Cup
13	24 June 1958	Råsunda Stadium, Solna, Sweden	10	Brazil	1–1	2–5	1958 FIFA World Cup
14	28 June 1958	Ullevi, Gothenburg, Sweden	11	West Germany	1–0	6–3	1958 FIFA World Cup
15	28 June 1958	Ullevi, Gothenburg, Sweden	11	West Germany	3–1	6–3	1958 FIFA World Cup
16	28 June 1958	Ullevi, Gothenburg, Sweden	11	West Germany	5–2	6–3	1958 FIFA World Cup
17	28 June 1958	Ullevi, Gothenburg, Sweden	11	West Germany	6–3	6–3	1958 FIFA World Cup
18	1 October 1958	Parc des Princes, Paris, France	12	Greece	2–0	7–1	UEFA Euro 1960 qualifiers
19	1 October 1958	Parc des Princes, Paris, France	12	Greece	6–1	7–1	UEFA Euro 1960 qualifiers
20	5 October 1958	Praterstadion, Vienna, Austria	13	Austria	2–1	2–1	Friendly
21	9 November 1958	Stade Olympique de Colombes, Colombes, France	15	Italy	2–2	2–2	Friendly
22	11 November 1959	Stade Olympique de Colombes, Colombes, France	17	Portugal	1–0	5–3	Friendly
23	11 November 1959	Stade Olympique de Colombes, Colombes, France	17	Portugal	4–2	5–3	Friendly
24	11 November 1959	Stade Olympique de Colombes, Colombes, France	17	Portugal	5–2	5–3	Friendly
25	13 December 1959	Stade Olympique de Colombes, Colombes, France	18	Austria	1–0	5–2	UEFA Euro 1960 qualifiers
26	13 December 1959	Stade Olympique de Colombes, Colombes, France	18	Austria	2–0	5–2	UEFA Euro 1960 qualifiers
27	13 December 1959	Stade Olympique de Colombes, Colombes, France	18	Austria	4–2	5–2	UEFA Euro 1960 qualifiers
28	17 December 1959	Parc des Princes, Paris, France	19	Spain	2–1	4–3	Friendly
29	16 March 1960	Parc des Princes, Paris, France	20	Chile	4–0	6–0	Friendly
30	16 March 1960	Parc des Princes, Paris, France	20	Chile	5–0	6–0	Friendly

== Honours ==
=== Player ===
Nice

- Division 1: 1955–56
- Coupe de France: 1953–54

Reims

- Division 1: 1957–58, 1959–60, 1961–62
- Coupe de France: 1957–58
- Trophée des Champions: 1958, 1960
- European Cup: runner-up 1958–59

France

- FIFA World Cup third place: 1958

Individual

- Ballon d'Or third-place: 1958
- FIFA World Cup Golden Boot: 1958
- Division 1 top scorer: 1957–58, 1959–60
- European Cup top scorer: 1958–59
- FIFA Order of Merit: 1994
- Golden Foot: 2003, as a football legend
- FIFA 100: 2004

=== Manager ===
Morocco

- African Cup of Nations third place: 1980

=== Orders ===
- Knight of the Legion of Honour: 1984
- Officer of the Legion of Honour: 2013
