= Thadée Cisowski =

Association football player (1927–2005)

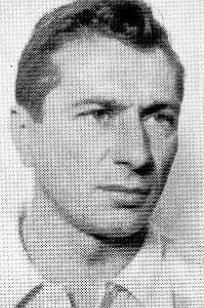
- Cisowski in 1955

Personal information
- Full name: Tadeusz Cisowski
- Date of birth: 16 February 1927
- Place of birth: Łasków, Poland
- Date of death: 24 February 2005 (aged 78)
- Place of death: Mâcon, France
- Height: 1.75 m (5 ft 9 in)
- Position: Striker

Youth career
- US Piennes

Senior career*
Years	Team	Apps	(Gls)
1947–1952	Metz	116	(69)
1952–1960	RC Paris	206	(186)
1960–1961	Valenciennes	28	(9)
1961–1962	Nantes	19	(8)
Total		369	(272)

International career
1951–1958	France	13	(11)
- * Club domestic league appearances and goals

Thadée Cisowski (16 February 1927 – 24 February 2005), originally Tadeusz Cisowski, was a footballer who played as a striker. He was regarded one of the best goalscorers in Championnat de France.

Born in Poland, he played for the France national team In the World Cup qualifying match against Belgium in 1956, he scored five goals, equaling the France record set by Eugène Maës in 1913. Injuries prevented him from playing in the 1954 and 1958 World Cups.

== Career statistics ==
=== Club ===
Appearances and goals by club, season and competition
Club	Season	League			Cup		Total	
Club	Season	Division	Apps	Goals	Apps	Goals	Apps	Goals
Metz	1947–48	Division 1	4	3			4	3
Metz	1948–49	Division 1	33	15	6	3	39	18
Metz	1949–50	Division 1	32	17	2	1	34	18
Metz	1950–51	Division 2	30	23			30	23
Metz	1951–52	Division 1	17	11	3	2	20	13
Metz	Total		116	69	11	5	127	74
RC Paris	1952–53	Division 1	30	13	4	3	34	16
RC Paris	1953–54	Division 2	34	35	7	7	41	42
RC Paris	1954–55	Division 1	14	9	3	2	17	11
RC Paris	1955–56	Division 1	29	31	3	5	32	36
RC Paris	1956–57	Division 1	28	33	3	5	31	38
RC Paris	1957–58	Division 1	14	9	2	3	16	12
RC Paris	1958–59	Division 1	29	30	2	0	31	30
RC Paris	1959–60	Division 1	28	27	3	4	31	31
RC Paris	Total		206	186	27	29	233	215
Valenciennes	1960–61	Division 1	28	9			28	9
Nantes	1961–62	Division 2	19	8	3	2	19	8
Career total			369	272	41	37	410	309

=== International ===
Appearances and goals by national team and year
National team	Year	Apps	Goals
France	1951	1	0
France	1952	3	1
France	1953	—	
France	1954	1	0
France	1955	—	
France	1956	4	8
France	1957	1	0
France	1958	2	0
France	1959	1	2
Total		13	11
