= Jean Vincent =

French football player and manager (1930–2013)

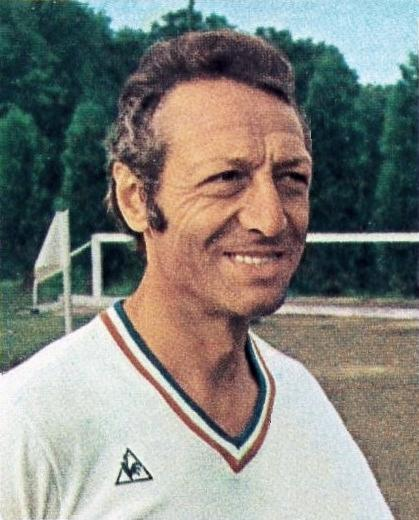
- Vincent in 1978

Personal information
- Date of birth: 29 November 1930
- Place of birth: Labeuvrière, French Third Republic
- Date of death: 13 August 2013 (aged 82)
- Place of death: Saint-Nazaire, France
- Position: Left winger

Youth career
- Auchel

Senior career*
Years	Team	Apps	(Gls)
1950–1956	Lille	155	(50)
1956–1964	Reims	267	(68)
Total		422	(118)

International career
1953–1961	France	46	(22)

Managerial career
- 1964–1967: Caen
- 1967–1970: La Chaux-de-Fonds
- 1971: Bastia
- 1971–1976: Lorient
- 1976–1982: Nantes
- 1982: Cameroon
- 1982–1984: Rennes
- 1985–1986: Wydad Casablanca
- 1986–1987: Tunisia
Medal record
Representing France
FIFA World Cup
Third place	1958 Sweden
- * Club domestic league appearances and goals

Jean Vincent (29 November 1930 – 13 August 2013) was a French international footballer and manager who played as a left winger.

== Playing career ==
Playing primarily at outside-left, Vincent enjoyed a highly successful career at club and international level, winning numerous titles and a run to the semi-finals of the 1958 World Cup.

- Lille (1950–1956) – Ligue 1 champion in 1954; Coupe de France winner in 1953 and 1955
- Reims (1956–1964) – Ligue 1 champion in 1958, 1960 and 1962; Coupe de France winner in 1958

He earned 46 caps and scored 22 goals for the France national team, and played and scored in the 1954 FIFA World Cup, the 1958 FIFA World Cup, and the 1960 European Football Championship.

== Coaching career ==
Vincent enjoyed considerable success as a coach at Nantes, taking them to two league championships. Appointed Cameroon's coach for the 1982 World Cup, with a side containing Thomas Nkono and Roger Milla, Cameroon performed admirably and drew all three games, missing out on a place in a second round only on goals scored.

- Caen
- La Chaux-de-Fonds
- Bastia
- Lorient
- Nantes – Ligue 1 champion in 1977 and 1980; Coupe de France winner in 1979
- Cameroon national team – coach at the 1982 FIFA World Cup
- Rennes
- WAC Casablanca
- Tunisia national team

== Death ==
Vincent died on 13 August 2013 at the age of 82.
