= 1953 DFB-Pokal final =

- Event: 1952–53 DFB-Pokal
Rot-Weiss Essen	Alemannia Aachen
2	1
- Date: 1 May 1953
- Venue: Rheinstadion, Düsseldorf
- Referee: Alois Reinhardt (Stuttgart)
- Attendance: 37,000

The 1953 DFB-Pokal final decided the winner of the 1952–53 DFB-Pokal, the 10th season of Germany's knockout football cup competition. It was played on 1 May 1953 at the Rheinstadion in Düsseldorf. Rot-Weiss Essen won the match 2–1 against Alemannia Aachen, to claim their 1st cup title.

== Route to the final ==
The DFB-Pokal began with 32 teams in a single-elimination knockout cup competition. There were a total of four rounds leading up to the final. Teams were drawn against each other, and the winner after 90 minutes would advance. If still tied, 30 minutes of extra time was played. If the score was still level, a replay would take place at the original away team's stadium. If still level after 90 minutes, 30 minutes of extra time was played. If the score was still level, a drawing of lots would decide who would advance to the next round.

Note: In all results below, the score of the finalist is given first (H: home; A: away; N: neutral).

Rot-Weiss Essen		Round	Alemannia Aachen
Opponent	Result	1952–53 DFB-Pokal	Opponent	Result
Jahn Regensburg (H)	5–0	Preliminary round	TuS Essen-West (N)	5–2
VfL Osnabrück (H)	2–0	Round of 16	1. FC Nürnberg (A); (H)	3–3 (a.e.t.); 2–0 (replay)
Hamburger SV (H)	6–1	Quarter-finals	Hamborn 07 (H)	3–1
Waldhof Mannheim (H)	3–2	Semi-finals	Wormatia Worms (H)	3–1

== Match ==
=== Details ===
1 May 1953
16:30 CET

Rot-Weiss Essen	2–1	Alemannia Aachen
Islacker 32'; Rahn 52'	Report	Derwall 56'

Rheinstadion, Düsseldorf
Attendance: 37,000
Referee: Alois Reinhardt (Stuttgart)

Rot-Weiss Essen	Alemannia Aachen

GK	1	(West Germany) Fritz Herkenrath
RB		(West Germany) Willi Göbel
LB		(West Germany) Willi Köchling
RH		(West Germany) Paul Jahnel
CH		(West Germany) Heinz Wewers
LH		(West Germany) Clemens Wientjes
OR		(West Germany) Helmut Rahn
IR		(West Germany) Franz Islacker
CF		(West Germany) August Gottschalk (c)
IL		(West Germany) Fritz Abromeit
OL		(West Germany) Bernhard Termath
Manager:
(West Germany) Karl Hohmann

GK	1	(West Germany) Wilfired Heinrichs
RB		(West Germany) Herbert Metzen
LB		(West Germany) Hans Coenen
RH		(West Germany) Michael Pfeiffer
CH		(West Germany) Fred Jansen
LH		(West Germany) Gerd Richter
OR		(West Germany) Robert Hartmann
IR		(West Germany) Rainer Gawell
CF		(West Germany) Günther Schmidt
IL		(West Germany) Jupp Derwall
OL		(West Germany) Josef Schmidt
Manager:
(West Germany) Hermann Lindemann

Match rules

- 90 minutes.
- 30 minutes of extra time if necessary.
- Replay if scores still level.
- No substitutions.
