= 1955 German football championship =

1955 German championship
Deutsche Fußballmeisterschaft

Tournament details
- Country: West Germany
- Dates: 4 May – 26 June
- Teams: 9

Final positions
- Champions: Rot-Weiss Essen; 1st German title
- Runners-up: 1. FC Kaiserslautern
- European Cup: Rot-Weiss Essen

Tournament statistics
- Matches played: 29
- Goals scored: 107 (3.69 per match)
- Top goal scorer: Franz Islacker (10 goals)

The 1955 German football championship was the culmination of the football season in West Germany in 1954-55. Rot-Weiss Essen were crowned champions for the first time after a group stage and a final.

It was Rot-Weiss Essen's first (and only) appearance in the German final, while Kaiserslautern were making their fifth appearance. It was also the fourth time Kaiserlautern had reached the final in five years, following their championship wins in 1951 and 1953, and their defeat in 1954.

The format used to determine the German champions was different from that which was used in the 1954 season. Nine teams qualified for the tournament, with those who qualified as a runner-up having to play qualifying matches. The remaining eight teams were split into two groups of four, and played two rounds of matches with games played home and away. The two group winners then played the national final.

== Qualified teams ==
The teams qualified through the 1954–55 Oberliga season:

Club	Qualified from
Hamburger SV	Oberliga Nord champions
Bremerhaven 93	Oberliga Nord runners-up
Rot-Weiss Essen	Oberliga West champions
SV Sodingen	Oberliga West runners-up
Viktoria 89 Berlin	Oberliga Berlin champions
1. FC Kaiserslautern	Oberliga Südwest champions
VfR Wormatia Worms	Oberliga Südwest runners-up
Kickers Offenbach	Oberliga Süd champions
SSV Reutlingen 05	Oberliga Süd runners-up

== Competition ==
=== First qualifying round ===
4 May 1955	SV Sodingen	3 – 0	SSV Reutlingen 05	Ludwigshafen
	Wächter 27'; Demski 34'; Linka 71'			Stadium: Südweststadion; Attendance: 15,000; Referee: Tretter (Ammer)

4 May 1955	Bremerhaven 93	3 – 3 a.e.t.	VfR Wormatia Worms	Düsseldorf
	Lang 38'; Mokroß 40'; Kapteina 46'		Rupprecht 17'; Mechnig 47'; Lill 65' (o.g.)	Stadium: Rheinstadion; Attendance: 12,000; Referee: Ternieden (Oberhausen)

==== Replay ====
5 May 1955	Bremerhaven 93	3 – 2	VfR Wormatia Worms	Düsseldorf
	Kapteina 53', 68'; Machniki 83'		Müller 57'; Sehrt 85'	Stadium: Rheinstadion; Attendance: 8,000; Referee: Ternieden (Oberhausen)

=== Second qualifying round ===
8 May 1955	VfR Wormatia Worms	2 – 1	SSV Reutlingen 05	Koblenz
	Weiß 38'; Schroer 60'		Grziwok 62'	Stadium: Stadion Oberwerth; Attendance: 7,000; Referee: Treichel (Berlin)

=== Group 1 ===
Pos	Team	Pld	W	D	L	GF	GA	GR	Pts	Qualification	FCK	HSV	SOD	V89
1	1. FC Kaiserslautern	6	3	3	0	20	8	2.500	9	Advance to final	—	2–2	2–2	10–0
2	Hamburger SV	6	3	2	1	8	5	1.600	8		1–2	—	1–0	1–0
3	SV Sodingen	6	2	3	1	13	9	1.444	7		2–2	1–1	—	5–1
4	Viktoria Berlin	6	0	0	6	4	23	0.174	0		1–2	0–2	2–3	—

Source: RSSSF
Rules for classification: 1) Points; 2) Goal ratio.

15 May 1955	Hamburger SV	1 – 0	SV Sodingen

15 May 1955	Viktoria 89 Berlin	1 – 2	1. FC Kaiserslautern

19 May 1955	1. FC Kaiserslautern	2 – 2	Hamburger SV

19 May 1955	SV Sodingen	5 – 1	Viktoria 89 Berlin	Gelsenkirchen
	Adamik 21'; Harpers 53'; Wächter 65', 82'; Wenker 80'		Nocht 70'	Stadium: Glückauf-Kampfbahn; Attendance: 20,000; Referee: Asmussen (Flensburg)

22 May 1955	SV Sodingen	2 – 2	1. FC Kaiserslautern

22 May 1955	Hamburger SV	1 – 0	Viktoria 89 Berlin

30 May 1955	1. FC Kaiserslautern	2 – 2	SV Sodingen

30 May 1955	Viktoria 89 Berlin	0 – 2	Hamburger SV

5 June 1955	Hamburger SV	1 – 2	1. FC Kaiserslautern

5 June 1955	Viktoria 89 Berlin	2 – 3	SV Sodingen

11 June 1955	SV Sodingen	1 – 1	Hamburger SV

11 June 1955	1. FC Kaiserslautern	10 – 0	Viktoria 89 Berlin

=== Group 2 ===
Pos	Team	Pld	W	D	L	GF	GA	GR	Pts	Qualification	RWE	B93	KOF	W08
1	Rot-Weiss Essen	6	4	2	0	16	5	3.200	10	Advance to final	—	4–0	4–1	1–1
2	Bremerhaven 93	6	2	2	2	5	10	0.500	6		1–1	—	2–0	1–0
3	Kickers Offenbach	6	2	0	4	11	12	0.917	4		1–3	4–0	—	5–2
4	Wormatia Worms	6	1	2	3	6	11	0.545	4		1–3	1–1	1–0	—

Source: RSSSF
Rules for classification: 1) Points; 2) Goal ratio.

15 May 1955	VfR Wormatia Worms	1 – 0	Kickers Offenbach

15 May 1955	Rot-Weiss Essen	4 – 0	Bremerhaven 93

19 May 1955	Kickers Offenbach	1 – 3	Rot-Weiss Essen

19 May 1955	Bremerhaven 93	1 – 0	VfR Wormatia Worms

22 May 1955	Bremerhaven 93	2 – 0	Kickers Offenbach

22 May 1955	Rot-Weiss Essen	1 – 1	VfR Wormatia Worms

30 May 1955	Kickers Offenbach	4 – 0	Bremerhaven 93

30 May 1955	VfR Wormatia Worms	1 – 3	Rot-Weiss Essen

5 June 1955	Rot-Weiss Essen	4 – 1	Kickers Offenbach

5 June 1955	VfR Wormatia Worms	1 – 1	Bremerhaven 93

11 June 1955	Bremerhaven 93	1 – 1	Rot-Weiss Essen

11 June 1955	Kickers Offenbach	5 – 2	VfR Wormatia Worms

=== Final ===
26 June 1955

Rot-Weiss Essen	4–3	1. FC Kaiserslautern
Islacker 18', 43', 85'; Röhrig 27'		Wenzel 11', 56'; Baßler 72' (pen.)

Niedersachsenstadion, Hannover
Attendance: 76,000
Referee: A. Meißner (Nuremberg)

ROT-WEISS ESSEN:
GK	1	(West Germany) Fritz Herkenrath
RB	2	(West Germany) Joachim Jänisch
CB	5	(West Germany) Heinz Wewers
LB	3	(West Germany) Willi Köchling
RH	4	(West Germany) Paul Jahnel
LH	6	(West Germany) Willi Grewer
OR	7	(West Germany) Helmut Rahn
IR	8	(West Germany) Franz Islacker
CF	9	(West Germany) August Gottschalk (c)
IL	10	(Netherlands) Johannes Röhrig
OL	11	(West Germany) Bernhard Termath
Manager:
(West Germany) Fritz Szepan

1. FC KAISERSLAUTERN:
GK	1	(West Germany) Willi Hölz
RB	2	(West Germany) Werner Baßler
CB	5	(West Germany) Werner Liebrich
LB	3	(West Germany) Werner Kohlmeyer
RH	4	(West Germany) Werner Mangold
LH	6	(West Germany) Otto Render
OR	7	(West Germany) Erwin Scheffler
IR	8	(West Germany) Fritz Walter (c)
CF	9	(West Germany) Horst Eckel
IL	10	(West Germany) Willi Wenzel
OL	11	(West Germany) Karl Wanger
Manager:
(West Germany) Richard Schneider

== Sources ==
- 1954-55 at Weltfussball.de
- Germany - Championship 1955 at RSSSF.com
- German championship 1955 at Fussballdaten.de
