= Islacker =

Islacker is a surname. Notable people with the surname include:

- Frank Islacker (born 1963), German footballer, father of Mandy and son of Franz
- Franz Islacker (1926–1970), German footballer
- Mandy Islacker (born 1988), German footballer
