= 1955–56 European Cup =

European football tournament

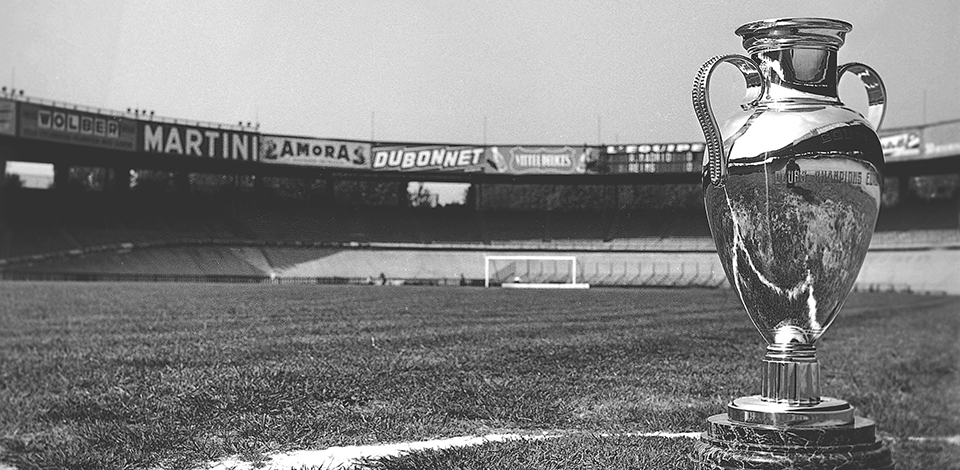
- The Parc des Princes in Paris hosted the final.

Tournament details
- Dates: 4 September 1955 – 13 June 1956
- Teams: 16 (from 16 associations)

Final positions
- Champions: (Spain) Real Madrid (1st title)
- Runners-up: (France) Reims

Tournament statistics
- Matches played: 29
- Goals scored: 127 (4.38 per match)
- Attendance: 900,021 (31,035 per match)
- Top scorer(s): Miloš Milutinović (Partizan); 8 goals

The 1955–56 European Cup was the first season of the European Cup, UEFA's premier club football tournament. It was won by Real Madrid, who defeated Reims 4–3 in the final at Parc des Princes, Paris, on 13 June 1956.

UEFA had been officially inaugurated on 15 June 1954 in Basel, Switzerland after consultation between the Italian, French, and Belgian associations. The first round pairings were fixed by the organisers and not drawn as would be the case for all future European Cup matches. The clubs participating in the first season of the European Cup were selected by French football magazine L'Equipe on the basis that they were representative and prestigious clubs in Europe.

When the tournament started, Real Madrid, Anderlecht, AC Milan, Rot-Weiss Essen, Reims, Djurgården and AGF were the reigning champions of their respective national leagues. English champions Chelsea initially agreed to compete and were drawn against Swedish side Djurgården; however, under pressure from the Football League, who saw the tournament as a distraction to domestic football, they later withdrew from the competition, and were replaced by Gwardia Warsaw of Poland. In addition, Holland Sport, Honvéd and AB rejected the opportunity to represent the Netherlands, Hungary and Denmark, being replaced by PSV Eindhoven, Vörös Lobogó and AGF respectively.

Scottish champions Aberdeen were controversially overlooked by the SFA in favour of Hibernian who finished in fifth place. They were considered one of the best teams in Scotland, having won the Scottish title in 1950–51 and 1951–52, but the main reason they were invited was because they were the only team in the country to have floodlights installed at their ground. Dynamo Moscow, the champions of the Soviet Union, did not participate due to climatic restrictions. This was also the only UEFA tournament to include a representative of Saarland, unified into West Germany in 1957. The remaining sides (including Gwardia) were selected on the basis of prestige by the editors of L'Equipe before their respective leagues had concluded. Incidentally, the Polish side could not host the home fixture at their new stadium, so the match was instead played at the home of crosstown rivals Legia, themselves the reigning national champions.

== Teams ==
The 16 participating teams (and their final ranking in their respective national leagues) were:

- (Austria) Rapid Wien (3rd)
- (Belgium) Anderlecht (1st)
- (Denmark) AGF (1st)
- (France) Reims (1st)
- (Hungary) Vörös Lobogó (2nd)
- (Italy) Milan (1st)
- (Netherlands) PSV Eindhoven (3rd)
- (Poland) Gwardia Warsaw (4th)
- (Portugal) Sporting CP (3rd)
- (Saar Protectorate) Saarbrücken (3rd)
- (Scotland) Hibernian (5th)
- (Spain) Real Madrid (1st)
- (Sweden) Djurgården (1st)
- (Switzerland) Servette (6th)
- (West Germany) Rot-Weiss Essen (1st)
- (Socialist Federal Republic of Yugoslavia) Partizan (5th)

== Bracket ==
First round
(Switzerland) Servette	0	0	0
(Spain) Real Madrid	2	5	7
(Portugal) Sporting CP	3	2	5
(Socialist Federal Republic of Yugoslavia) Partizan	3	5	8
(Austria) Rapid Wien	6	0	6
(Netherlands) PSV Eindhoven	1	1	2
(Italy) Milan	3	4	7
(Saar Protectorate) Saarbrücken	4	1	5
(Denmark) AGF	0	2	2
(France) Reims	2	2	4
(Hungary) Vörös Lobogó	6	4	10
(Belgium) Anderlecht	3	1	4
(Sweden) Djurgården	0	4	4
(Poland) Gwardia Warsaw	0	1	1
(West Germany) Rot-Weiss Essen	0	1	1
(Scotland) Hibernian	4	1	5

Quarter-finals
(Spain) Real Madrid	4	0	4
(Socialist Federal Republic of Yugoslavia) Partizan	0	3	3
(Austria) Rapid Wien	1	2	3
(Italy) Milan	1	7	8
(France) Reims	4	4	8
(Hungary) Vörös Lobogó	2	4	6
(Sweden) Djurgården	1	0	1
(Scotland) Hibernian	3	1	4

Semi-finals
(Spain) Real Madrid	4	1	5
(Italy) Milan	2	2	4
(France) Reims	2	1	3
(Scotland) Hibernian	0	0	0

Final
(Spain) Real Madrid	4
(France) Reims	3

== First round ==
Location of teams in the 1955–56 European Cup.

Team 1	Agg.	Team 2	1st leg	2nd leg
Sporting CP (Portugal)	5–8	(Socialist Federal Republic of Yugoslavia) Partizan	3–3	2–5
Vörös Lobogó (Hungary)	10–4	(Belgium) Anderlecht	6–3	4–1
Servette (Switzerland)	0–7	(Spain) Real Madrid	0–2	0–5
Rot-Weiss Essen (West Germany)	1–5	(Scotland) Hibernian	0–4	1–1
Djurgården (Sweden)	4–1	(Poland) Gwardia Warsaw	0–0	4–1
AGF (Denmark)	2–4	(France) Reims	0–2	2–2
Rapid Wien (Austria)	6–2	(Netherlands) PSV Eindhoven	6–1	0–1
Milan (Italy)	7–5	(Saar Protectorate) Saarbrücken	3–4	4–1

=== First leg ===
4 September 1955
18:00 CET

Sporting CP (Portugal)	3–3	(Socialist Federal Republic of Yugoslavia) Partizan
Martins 14', 78'; Quim 65'	Report	M. Milutinović 45', 50'; Bobek 73'

Estádio Nacional, Lisbon
Attendance: 30,000
Referee: Édouard Harzic (France)

7 September 1955
20:00 CET

Vörös Lobogó (Hungary)	6–3	(Belgium) Anderlecht
I. Szimcsák 8'; Palotás 25', 59', 80'; Hidegkuti 28'; Sándor 83'	Report	Vanderwilt 7'; Van den Bosch 39', 79'

Népstadion, Budapest
Attendance: 35,000
Referee: Friedrich Mayer (Austria)

8 September 1955
16:45 CET

Servette (Switzerland)	0–2	(Spain) Real Madrid
	Report	Muñoz 74'; Rial 89'

Charmilles Stadium, Geneva
Attendance: 7,000
Referee: Robert Sautelle (France)

14 September 1955
20:00 CET

Rot-Weiss Essen (West Germany)	0–4	(Scotland) Hibernian
	Report	Turnbull 35', 53'; L. Reilly 44'; Ormond 81'

Georg-Melches-Stadion, Essen
Attendance: 5,000
Referee: Johann Bronkhorst (Netherlands)

20 September 1955
20:00 CET

Djurgården (Sweden)	0–0	(Poland) Gwardia Warsaw
	Report

Stockholm Olympic Stadium, Stockholm
Attendance: 3,574
Referee: Jarl Hansen (Denmark)

21 September 1955
16:00 CET

Rapid Wien (Austria)	6–1	(Netherlands) PSV Eindhoven
A. Körner 12', 62', 82'; Mehsarosch 55'; Hanappi 56'; Probst 60'	Report	Fransen 18'

Pfarrwiese, Vienna
Attendance: 10,000
Referee: Emil Schmetzer (West Germany)

21 September 1955
20:00 CET

AGF (Denmark)	0–2	(France) Reims
	Report	Glovacki 7', 72'

Idrætsparken, Copenhagen
Attendance: 18,000
Referee: Klaas Schipper (Netherlands)

1 November 1955
20:00 CET

Milan (Italy)	3–4	(Saar Protectorate) Saarbrücken
Frignani 15'; Schiaffino 33'; Dal Monte 37'	Report	Krieger 5'; Philippi 43'; Schirra 67'; Martin 69'

San Siro, Milan
Attendance: 18,000
Referee: Gottfried Dienst (Switzerland)

=== Second leg ===
12 October 1955
15:00 CET

Partizan (Socialist Federal Republic of Yugoslavia)	5–2	(Portugal) Sporting CP
M. Milutinović 15', 29', 64', 74'; Jocić 88'	Report	Brandão 49', 77'

Stadion JNA, Belgrade
Attendance: 15,000
Referee: György Dankó (Hungary)

Partizan won 8–5 on aggregate.

12 October 1955
16:30 CET

Real Madrid (Spain)	5–0	(Switzerland) Servette
Di Stéfano 29', 61'; Joseíto 44'; Rial 46'; Molowny 54'	Report

Santiago Bernabéu, Madrid
Attendance: 40,318
Referee: Riccardo Pieri (Italy)

Real Madrid won 7–0 on aggregate.

12 October 1955
20:00 CET

Gwardia Warsaw (Poland)	1–4	(Sweden) Djurgården
Baszkiewicz 14'	Report	Eriksson 5', 17', 22'; Sandberg 29'

Stadion Wojska Polskiego, Warsaw
Attendance: 25,000
Referee: Édouard Harzic (France)

Djurgården won 4–1 on aggregate.

12 October 1955
20:15 CET

Hibernian (Scotland)	1–1	(West Germany) Rot-Weiss Essen
Buchanan 5'	Report	Abromeit 47'

Easter Road, Edinburgh
Attendance: 30,000
Referee: Arthur Edward Ellis (England)

Hibernian won 5–1 on aggregate.

19 October 1955
20:00 CET

Anderlecht (Belgium)	1–4	(Hungary) Vörös Lobogó
Van den Bosch 38'	Report	Hidegkuti 25'; Lantos 78'; Palotás 85'; Kovács I 86'

Émile Versé Stadium, Anderlecht
Attendance: 33,000
Referee: Johan Bronkhorst (Netherlands)

Vörös Lobogó won 10–4 on aggregate.

26 October 1955
20:00 CET

Reims (France)	2–2	(Denmark) AGF
Glovacki 47'; Bliard 60'	Report	Jensen 77'; Bjerregaard 83'

Stade Auguste-Delaune, Reims
Attendance: 5,845
Referee: Alfred Bond (England)

Reims won 4–2 on aggregate.

1 November 1955
14:15 CET

PSV Eindhoven (Netherlands)	1–0	(Austria) Rapid Wien
Fransen 9'	Report

Philips Sportpark, Eindhoven
Attendance: 8,000
Referee: Aloïs Smidts (Belgium)

Rapid Wien won 6–2 on aggregate.

23 November 1955
14:15 CET

Saarbrücken (Saar Protectorate)	1–4	(Italy) Milan
Binkert 32'	Report	Valli 8', 77'; Puff 75' (o.g.); Beraldo 86'

Ludwigspark, Saarbrücken
Attendance: 15,000
Referee: Klaas Schipper (Netherlands)

Milan won 7–5 on aggregate.

== Quarter-finals ==
Team 1	Agg.	Team 2	1st leg	2nd leg
Djurgården (Sweden)	1–4	(Scotland) Hibernian	1–3	0–1
Reims (France)	8–6	(Hungary) Vörös Lobogó	4–2	4–4
Real Madrid (Spain)	4–3	(Socialist Federal Republic of Yugoslavia) Partizan	4–0	0–3
Rapid Wien (Austria)	3–8	(Italy) Milan	1–1	2–7

=== First leg ===
23 November 1955
21:00 CET

Djurgården (Sweden)	1–3	(Scotland) Hibernian
Eklund 1'	Report	Combe 18'; L. Reilly 49'; Olsson 86' (o.g.)

Firhill Park, Glasgow (Note: Match switched to Glasgow due to a frozen pitch in Sweden.)
Attendance: 21,962
Referee: Arthur Edward Ellis (England)

14 December 1955
20:00 CET

Reims (France)	4–2	(Hungary) Vörös Lobogó
Glovacki 14'; Leblond 33', 57'; Bliard 42'	Report	Szolnok 34'; Lantos 77' (pen.)

Parc des Princes, Paris
Attendance: 36,088
Referee: Gottfried Dienst (Switzerland)

25 December 1955
15:45 CET

Real Madrid (Spain)	4–0	(Socialist Federal Republic of Yugoslavia) Partizan
Castaño 12', 23'; Gento 36'; Di Stéfano 70'	Report

Santiago Bernabéu, Madrid
Attendance: 105,532
Referee: Édouard Harzic (France)

18 January 1956
14:15 CET

Rapid Wien (Austria)	1–1	(Italy) Milan
R. Körner 26' (pen.)	Report	Nordahl 20'

Pfarrwiese, Vienna
Attendance: 18,000
Referee: Jaroslav Vlček (Czechoslovakia)

Note – differences in information: RSSSF website indicates that the goal scored on 26th minute was scored by Robert Körner, while UEFA website indicates that it was scored by his younger brother Alfred Körner.

=== Second leg ===
28 November 1955
20:30 CET

Hibernian (Scotland)	1–0	(Sweden) Djurgården
Turnbull 70' (pen.)	Report

Easter Road, Edinburgh
Attendance: 31,346
Referee: Arthur Edward Ellis (England)

Hibernian won 4–1 on aggregate.

28 December 1955
20:00 CET

Vörös Lobogó (Hungary)	4–4	(France) Reims
Lantos 11' (pen.), 74' (pen.); Palotás 53', 82'	Report	Glovacki 6'; Bliard 20', 44'; Templin 52'

Népstadion, Budapest
Attendance: 35,000
Referee: John Husband (England)

Reims won 8–6 on aggregate.

29 January 1956
15:00 CET

Partizan (Socialist Federal Republic of Yugoslavia)	3–0	(Spain) Real Madrid
Milutinović 24', 87'; Mihajlović 46'	Report

Stadion JNA, Belgrade
Attendance: 40,000
Referee: Josef Gulde (Switzerland)

Real Madrid won 4–3 on aggregate.

12 February 1956
15:00 CET

Milan (Italy)	7–2	(Austria) Rapid Wien
Mariani 15'; Nordahl 23', 50'; Ricagni 26', 63'; Frignani 56'; Schiaffino 75'	Report	Golobic 35'; Dienst 59'

San Siro, Milan
Attendance: 35,000
Referee: Leo Horn (Netherlands)

Milan won 8–3 on aggregate.

== Semi-finals ==
Team 1	Agg.	Team 2	1st leg	2nd leg
Reims (France)	3–0	(Scotland) Hibernian	2–0	1–0
Real Madrid (Spain)	5–4	(Italy) Milan	4–2	1–2

=== First leg ===
4 April 1956
20:00 CET

Reims (France)	2–0	(Scotland) Hibernian
Leblond 67'; Bliard 89'	Report

Parc des Princes, Paris
Attendance: 35,486
Referee: Manuel Asensi Martín (Spain)

19 April 1956
16:30 CET

Real Madrid (Spain)	4–2	(Italy) Milan
Rial 6'; Joseíto 25'; Olsen 40'; Di Stéfano 62'	Report	Nordahl 9'; Schiaffino 30'

Santiago Bernabéu, Madrid
Attendance: 129,690
Referee: Édouard Harzic (France)

=== Second leg ===
18 April 1956
20:30 CET

Hibernian (Scotland)	0–1	(France) Reims
	Report	Glovacki 57'

Easter Road, Edinburgh
Attendance: 44,941
Referee: Arthur Edward Ellis (England)

Reims won 3–0 on aggregate.

1 May 1956
15:00 CET

Milan (Italy)	2–1	(Spain) Real Madrid
Dal Monte 69' (pen.), 86' (pen.)	Report	Joseíto 65'

San Siro, Milan
Attendance: 30,000
Referee: Erich Steiner (Austria)

Real Madrid won 5–4 on aggregate.

== Final ==
13 June 1956
20:30 CET

Real Madrid (Spain)	4–3	(France) Reims
Di Stéfano 14'; Rial 30', 79'; Marquitos 67'	Report	Leblond 6'; Templin 10'; Hidalgo 62'

Parc des Princes, Paris
Attendance: 38,239
Referee: Arthur Edward Ellis (England)

== Top goalscorers ==
Rank	Player	Team	Goals
1	(Socialist Federal Republic of Yugoslavia) Miloš Milutinović	(Socialist Federal Republic of Yugoslavia) Partizan	8
2	(France) Léon Glovacki	(France) Reims	6
2	(Hungary) Péter Palotás	(Hungary) Vörös Lobogó	6
4	(France) René Bliard	(France) Reims	5
4	(Spain) Alfredo Di Stéfano	(Spain) Real Madrid	5
4	(Argentina) Héctor Rial	(Spain) Real Madrid	5
7	(Hungary) Mihály Lantos	(Hungary) Vörös Lobogó	4
7	(France) Michel Leblond	(France) Reims	4
7	(Sweden) Gunnar Nordahl	(Italy) Milan	4
10	(Belgium) Hippolyte Van den Bosch	(Belgium) Anderlecht	3
10	(Italy) Giorgio Dal Monte	(Italy) Milan	3
10	(Sweden) John Eriksson	(Sweden) Djurgården	3
10	(Spain) Joseíto	(Spain) Real Madrid	3
10	(Austria) Alfred Körner	(Austria) Rapid Wien	3
10	(Italy) Juan Alberto Schiaffino	(Italy) Milan	3
10	(Scotland) Eddie Turnbull	(Scotland) Hibernian	3
