= List of European players with the most matches and goals at major tournaments =

A total of 4,755 European football players have played at least one match across the 22 final tournaments of the men's FIFA World Cup and 17 final tournaments of the men's UEFA European Championship.

Matches	≥ 50	40–50	35–39	30–34	25–29	20–24	15–19	10–14	9	8	7	6	5	4	3	2	1	Total
No. of players	1	0	10	11	29	75	139	410	118	168	200	309	354	499	809	773	850	4,755

A total of 2,557 goals have been scored by European players in matches at these tournaments, not counting penalties scored during shoot-outs. These goals were scored by 1,169 different individuals, of whom 24 have scored ten or more.

Goals	≥ 20	19	18	17	16	15	14	13	12	11	10	9	8	7	6	5	4	3	2	1	Total
No. of players	3	1	1	0	1	1	1	3	2	3	10	12	8	11	29	26	63	115	226	655	1,169

== Overall top goalscorers ==
Table key
**Bold**	Denotes player still active at international level
[ ]	Denotes tournaments where the player was part of the squad, but did not play in a match
( )	Denotes tournaments where the player played in a match, but did not score a goal
†	Denotes the tournament record for the most goals

Players with at least 10 goals at World Cup and Euro tournaments
Rank	Player	Team	Total goals	Total matches	Total ratio	Goals (World Cup)	Goals (Euro)	Tournaments
1	Cristiano Ronaldo	Portugal	25	57	0.44	11	14^{†}	2004, 2006, 2008, 2010, 2012, 2014, 2016, 2018, 2020, 2022, (2024), 2026
2	**Kylian Mbappé**	France	23	31	0.74	22^{†}	1	2018, (2020), 2022, 2024, 2026
3	**Harry Kane**	England	21	36	0.58	14	7	(2016), 2018, 2020, 2022, 2024, 2026
4	Miroslav Klose	Germany	19	37	0.51	16	3	2002, (2004), 2006, 2008, 2010, 2012, 2014
5	Gerd Müller	West Germany	18	15	1.20	14	4	1970, 1972, 1974
6	Jürgen Klinsmann	West Germany; Germany	16	30	0.53	11	5	1988, 1990, 1992, 1994, 1996, 1998
7	Michel Platini	France	14	19	0.74	5	9	1978, 1982, 1984, 1986
7	Romelu Lukaku	Belgium	14	32	0.44	8	6	2014, 2016, 2018, 2020, (2022), (2024), 2026
9	Just Fontaine	France	13	6	2.17	13	0	1958
9	David Villa	Spain	13	16	0.81	9	4	2006, 2008, 2010, 2014
11	Rudi Völler	West Germany; Germany	12	23	0.52	8	4	1984, 1986, 1988, 1990, (1992), 1994
11	Thierry Henry	France	12	28	0.43	6	6	1998, 2000, (2002), 2004, 2006, 2008, (2010)
13	Sándor Kocsis	Hungary	11	5	2.20	11	0	1954
13	**Ivan Perišić**	Croatia	11	34	0.32	7	4	(2012), 2014, 2016, 2018, 2020, 2022, (2024), 2026
13	Antoine Griezmann	France	11	36	0.31	4	7	(2014), 2016, 2018, 2020, (2022), (2024)
16	Helmut Rahn	West Germany	10	10	1.00	10	0	1954, 1958
16	Gary Lineker	England	10	18	0.56	10	0	1986, (1988), 1990, (1992)
16	Grzegorz Lato	Poland	10	20	0.50	10	0	1974, 1978, 1982
16	**Álvaro Morata**	Spain	10	20	0.50	3	7	2016, 2020, 2022, 2024
16	**Jude Bellingham**	England	10	23	0.43	8	2	(2020), 2022, 2024, 2026
16	Xherdan Shaqiri	Switzerland	10	23	0.43	5	5	(2010), 2014, 2016, 2018, 2020, 2022, 2024
16	Dennis Bergkamp	Netherlands	10	25	0.40	6	4	1992, 1994, 1996, 1998, (2000)
16	Zinedine Zidane	France	10	26	0.38	5	5	(1996), 1998, 2000, (2002), 2004, 2006
16	Karl-Heinz Rummenigge	West Germany	10	26	0.38	9	1	1978, 1980, 1982, (1984), 1986
16	Thomas Müller	Germany	10	36	0.28	10	0	2010, (2012), 2014, (2016), (2018), (2020), (2022), (2024)

== Most matches played ==
Table key
**Bold**	Denotes player still active at international level
[ ]	Denotes tournaments where the player was part of the squad, but did not play in a match
†	Denotes the tournament record for the most matches

Players with at least 30 matches at World Cup and Euro tournaments
Rank	Player	Team	Total matches	Matches (World Cup)	Matches (Euro)	Tournaments
1	Cristiano Ronaldo	Portugal	57	27	30^{†}	2004, 2006, 2008, 2010, 2012, 2014, 2016, 2018, 2020, 2022, 2024, 2026
2	Manuel Neuer	Germany	43	23	20	2010, 2012, 2014, 2016, 2018, 2020, 2022, 2024, 2026
3	**Luka Modrić**	Croatia	38	22	16	2006, 2008, 2012, 2014, 2016, 2018, 2020, 2022, 2024, 2026
3	Bastian Schweinsteiger	Germany	38	20	18	2004, 2006, 2008, 2010, 2012, 2014, 2016
5	Miroslav Klose	Germany	37	24	13	2002, 2004, 2006, 2008, 2010, 2012, 2014
6	Antoine Griezmann	France	36	19	17	2014, 2016, 2018, 2020, 2022, 2024
6	**Harry Kane**	England	36	18	18	2016, 2018, 2020, 2022, 2024, 2026
6	Paolo Maldini	Italy	36	23	13	1988, 1990, 1994, 1996, 1998, 2000, 2002
6	Lothar Matthäus	Germany	36	25	11	1980, 1982, 1984, 1986, 1988, 1990, 1994, 1998, 2000
6	Thomas Müller	Germany	36	19	17	2010, 2012, 2014, 2016, 2018, 2020, 2022, 2024
11	Hugo Lloris	France	35	20	15	2010, 2012, 2014, 2016, 2018, 2020, 2022
11	Pepe	Portugal	35	12	23	2008, 2010, 2012, 2014, 2016, 2018, 2020, 2022, 2024
13	Philipp Lahm	Germany	34	20	14	2004, 2006, 2008, 2010, 2012, 2014
13	**Ivan Perišić**	Croatia	34	21	13	2012, 2014, 2016, 2018, 2020, 2022, 2024, 2026
15	Olivier Giroud	France	33	18	15	2012, 2014, 2016, 2018, 2020, 2022, 2024
15	Toni Kroos	Germany	33	14	19	2010, 2012, 2014, 2016, 2018, 2020, 2024
15	**Jordan Pickford**	England	33	19	14	2018, 2020, 2022, 2024, 2026
18	Romelu Lukaku	Belgium	32	18	14	2014, 2016, 2018, 2020, 2022, 2024, 2026
18	Sergio Ramos	Spain	32	17	15	2006, 2008, 2010, 2012, 2014, 2016, 2018
18	**Ricardo Rodriguez**	Switzerland	32	18	14	2014, 2016, 2018, 2020, 2022, 2024, 2026
18	Lilian Thuram	France	32	16	16	1996, 1998, 2000, 2002, 2004, 2006, 2008
22	Gianluigi Buffon	Italy	31	14	17	[2002], 2004, 2006, 2008, 2010, 2012, 2014, 2016
22	Sergio Busquets	Spain	31	17	14	2010, 2012, 2014, 2016, 2018, 2020, 2022
22	Iker Casillas	Spain	31	17	14	[2000], 2002, 2004, 2006, 2008, 2010, 2012, 2014, [2016]
22	**Thibaut Courtois**	Belgium	31	21	10	2014, 2016, 2018, 2020, 2022, 2026
22	**Kevin De Bruyne**	Belgium	31	18	13	2014, 2016, 2018, 2020, 2022, 2024, 2026
22	**Kylian Mbappé**	France	31	22	9	2018, 2020, 2022, 2024, 2026
22	**John Stones**	England	31	17	14	[2016], 2018, 2020, 2022, 2024, 2026
22	**Granit Xhaka**	Switzerland	31	18	13	2014, 2016, 2018, 2020, 2022, 2024, 2026
30	Andrés Iniesta	Spain	30	14	16	2006, 2008, 2010, 2012, 2014, 2016, 2018
30	Jürgen Klinsmann	West Germany; Germany	30	17	13	1988, 1990, 1992, 1994, 1996, 1998
