= Trofeo Concepción Arenal =

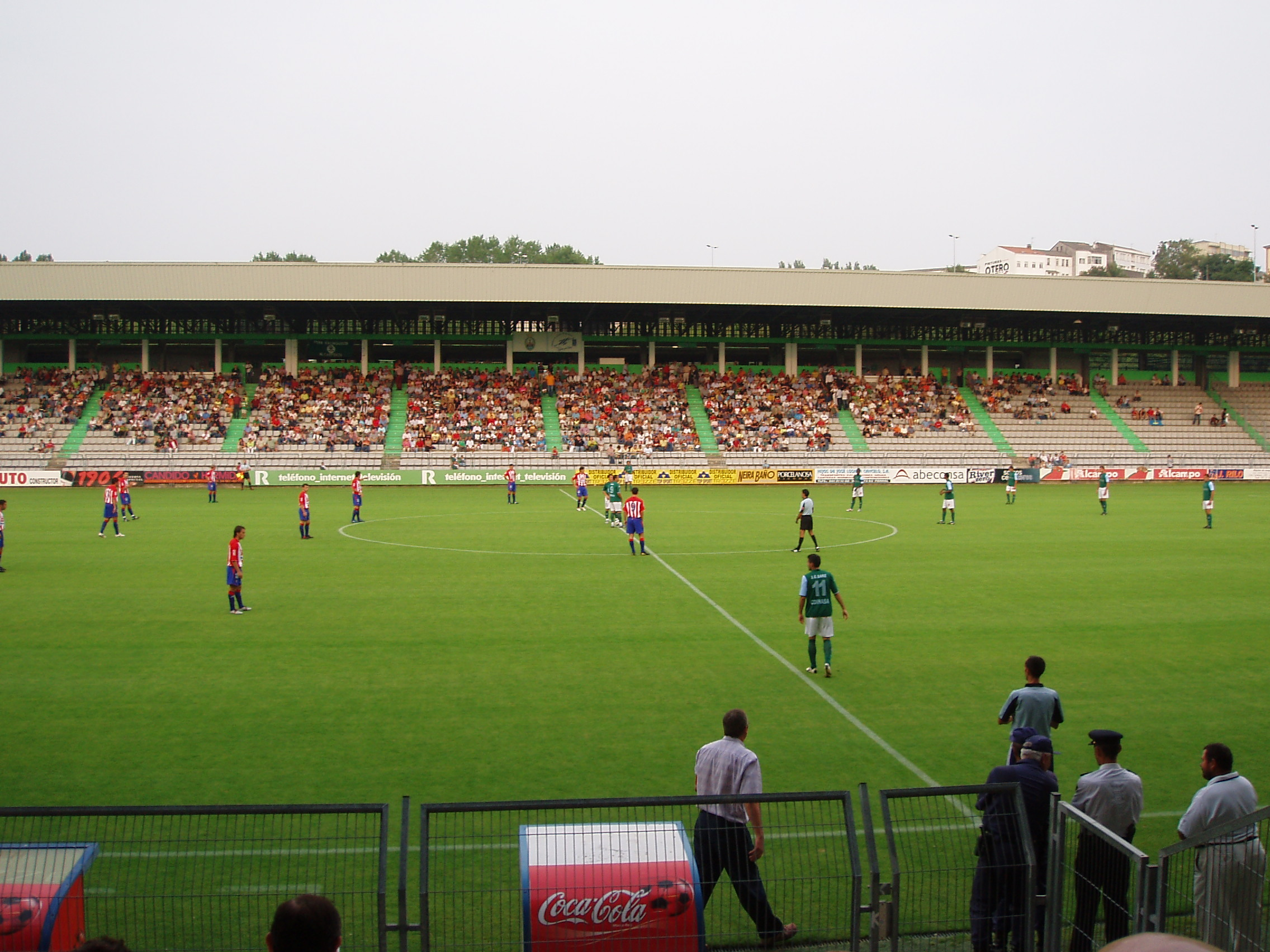
- Moments before the start of the 2005 Concepción Arenal Trophy, which was contested by Racing de Ferrol and Sporting de Gijón
- Organiser(s): Racing de Ferrol
- Founded: 1953 (aged 72)
- Region: Galicia
- Current champions: Racing de Ferrol
- Most championships: Deportivo de La Coruña (16 titles)
- 2022 Trofeo Concepción Arenal

The Trofeo Concepción Arenal (Spanish: Concepción Arenal Trophy) is a summer football competition organized by the Ferrol City Council and Racing de Ferrol since 1953, and played in Ferrol, Galicia. Named in honor of the writer Concepción Arenal, a Ferrol native, this cup is one of the most prestigious and oldest football tournaments held in Spain.

== History ==
The Trofeo Concepción Arenal was created in 1953 as part of the city's summer festivities, at the initiative of the then Mayor of Ferrol, José Manuel Alcántara Rocafort, and his Sports Councilor, Manuel Seijas Brea. Initially, the tournament was organized by the Ferrol City Council, but over time, Racing de Ferrol soon took over it.

Its first edition consisted of a single match between Athletic Bilbao and Valencia on 30 August 1953, which ended in a 3–1 win to the former, thanks to goals from Fuertes, Arteche, and Ignacio Azcarate. However, Valencia was able to redeem itself in the following edition in which they faced Atlético de Madrid, who scored in extra-time to take a 4–3 lead, but then Daniel Mañó scored a quick brace to seal a 5–4 victory for Valencia.

Throughout its long history, the trophy was contested in different formats: initially as one single match, but then triangular, and even knockout with semifinals and a final. The 1958 edition, for instance, was a triangular competition that pitted the hosts Racing de Ferrol, then in the Segunda División, against Real Oviedo and Real Betis, recently promoted to La Liga, and in fact, Ferrol was defeated by both teams, which meant that the title was decided when they faced each other on 31 August, with Betis winning 2–0, the courtesy of Castaño and Esteban Areta. Two days later, one Sevilla newspaper described this trophy as: "Betis went to Ferrol to establish their status as a great team and bring home a beautiful trophy that is ninety centimeters tall, from its base to its artistic crown. On the ornately embossed silver, it features goldcrests with the three competing teams on one side, and the goldcrest of the city of Ferrol in the other", and estimated its value at around 250,000 pesetas.

Numerous teams have participated, both Spanish and foreign, including Real Madrid, Barcelona, Porto, Aston Villa, and even the reigning European champions Ajax Amsterdam in 1995.

== Finals ==
Year	Champion	Runner-up	Results
1953	(Basque Country (autonomous community)) Athletic Club	(Valencian Community) Valencia	3–1
1954	(Valencian Community) Valencia	(Community of Madrid) Atlético de Madrid	5–4
1955	Not played		
1956	(Galicia (Spain)) Deportivo de La Coruña	Triangular tournament	
1957	(Galicia (Spain)) Celta de Vigo	Triangular tournament	
1958	(Andalusia) Real Betis	Triangular tournament	
1959	(Galicia (Spain)) Racing de Ferrol	Triangular tournament	
1960	(Region of Murcia) Real Murcia	Triangular tournament	
1961	Not played		
1962	(Andalusia) Real Betis	(Galicia (Spain)) Deportivo de La Coruña	1–1
1963	(Galicia (Spain)) Deportivo de La Coruña	(Portugal) Vitória de Guimarães	4–0
1964	(Galicia (Spain)) Racing de Ferrol	(Galicia (Spain)) Deportivo de La Coruña	2–1
1965	(Galicia (Spain)) Racing de Ferrol	Triangular tournament	
1966	(Galicia (Spain)) Deportivo de La Coruña	(Galicia (Spain)) Racing de Ferrol	1–1 (p)
1967	(Galicia (Spain)) Celta de Vigo	(Galicia (Spain)) Racing de Ferrol	1–0
1968	(Catalonia) Barcelona	(Aragon) Real Zaragoza	2–0
1969	(Galicia (Spain)) Deportivo de La Coruña	(Galicia (Spain)) Racing de Ferrol	2–1
1970	(Asturias) Sporting de Gijón	(Galicia (Spain)) Racing de Ferrol	2–1
1971	(Asturias) Sporting de Gijón	Triangular tournament	
1972	Not played		
1973	(Galicia (Spain)) Deportivo de La Coruña	(Galicia (Spain)) Racing de Ferrol	2-1
1974	(Galicia (Spain)) Deportivo de La Coruña	Triangular tournament	
1975	(Chile) Palestino	(Galicia (Spain)) Racing de Ferrol	4-0
1976	(Canary Islands) Las Palmas	(Galicia (Spain)) Racing de Ferrol	2-1
1977	(Community of Madrid) Real Madrid	(Galicia (Spain)) Racing de Ferrol	3–1
1978	(Valencian Community) Elche	(Galicia (Spain)) Racing de Ferrol	1–0
1979	(Basque Country (autonomous community)) Real Sociedad	(Galicia (Spain)) Racing de Ferrol	2–0
1980	Not played		
1981	(Galicia (Spain)) Racing de Ferrol	(Asturias) Real Oviedo	1–0
1982	(Galicia (Spain)) Deportivo de La Coruña	(Galicia (Spain)) Compostela	4–1
1983	Not played		
1984	(Community of Madrid) Real Madrid	(Galicia (Spain)) Deportivo de La Coruña	3–0
1985	(Galicia (Spain)) Deportivo de La Coruña	(Galicia (Spain)) Racing de Ferrol	2–1
1986	(Galicia (Spain)) Deportivo de La Coruña	(Uruguay) Nacional de Montevideo	2–2 (p)
1987	(Galicia (Spain)) Deportivo de La Coruña	Triangular tournament	
1988	(Galicia (Spain)) Racing de Ferrol	(Galicia (Spain)) As Pontes	2–1
1989	(Castile and León) Salamanca	(Galicia (Spain)) Racing de Ferrol	3–1
1990	Not played		
1991	(Galicia (Spain)) Celta de Vigo	(Galicia (Spain)) Racing de Ferrol	2–0
1992	(Galicia (Spain)) As Pontes	(Galicia (Spain)) Racing de Ferrol	2–2 (p)
1993	(Galicia (Spain)) Compostela	(Galicia (Spain)) Racing de Ferrol	3–1
1994	(England) Aston Villa	(Community of Madrid) Atlético Madrid	0–0 (p)
1995	(Netherlands) Ajax	(Aragon) Real Zaragoza	1–1 (p)
1996	(Galicia (Spain)) Deportivo de La Coruña	(Galicia (Spain)) Racing de Ferrol	3–1
1997	(Portugal) Porto	(Galicia (Spain)) Racing de Ferrol	1–0
1998	(Galicia (Spain)) Celta de Vigo	(Galicia (Spain)) Racing de Ferrol	7–2
1999	(Castile and León) Real Valladolid	(Galicia (Spain)) Racing de Ferrol	1–0
2000	Not played		
2001	(Galicia (Spain)) Racing de Ferrol	(Asturias) Sporting de Gijón	2–1
2002	(Galicia (Spain)) Deportivo de La Coruña	(Galicia (Spain)) Racing de Ferrol	1–0
2003	(Galicia (Spain)) Deportivo de La Coruña	(Galicia (Spain)) Racing de Ferrol	4–1
2004	(Galicia (Spain)) Celta de Vigo	(Galicia (Spain)) Racing de Ferrol	1–1 (p)
2005	(Galicia (Spain)) Racing de Ferrol	(Asturias) Sporting de Gijón	1–0
2006	(Andalusia) Recreativo de Huelva	(Galicia (Spain)) Racing de Ferrol	0–0 (p)
2007	(Galicia (Spain)) Racing de Ferrol	(Galicia (Spain)) Pontevedra	4–0
2008	(Aragon) Real Zaragoza	(Galicia (Spain)) Racing de Ferrol	3–2
2009	(Portugal) Río Ave	(Galicia (Spain)) Racing de Ferrol	1–0
2010	(Galicia (Spain)) Celta de Vigo	(Galicia (Spain)) Racing de Ferrol	3–0
2011	(Galicia (Spain)) Deportivo de La Coruña	(Galicia (Spain)) Racing de Ferrol	1–1 (4–3 p)
2012	Not played		
2013	(Castile and León) SD Ponferradina	(Galicia (Spain)) Racing de Ferrol	1–1 (9–8 p)
2014	Not played		
2015	(Galicia (Spain)) Lugo	(Galicia (Spain)) Racing de Ferrol	3–1
2016	(Galicia (Spain)) Deportivo de La Coruña	(Galicia (Spain)) Racing de Ferrol	2–0
2017	(Galicia (Spain)) Deportivo de La Coruña	(Galicia (Spain)) Racing de Ferrol	4–1
2018	(Galicia (Spain)) Deportivo de La Coruña	(Galicia (Spain)) Racing de Ferrol	1–0
2019	(Castile and León) SD Ponferradina	(Galicia (Spain)) Racing de Ferrol	2–1
2020	Not played		
2021	Not played		
2022	(Galicia (Spain)) Racing de Ferrol	(Galicia (Spain)) SD Compostela	4–1
2023	Not played		
2024	Not played		

== Most successful teams ==
Team	Titles	Years
(Galicia (Spain)) Deportivo de La Coruña	17	1956, 1963, 1966, 1969, 1973, 1974, 1982, 1985, 1986, 1987, 1996, 2002, 2003, 2011, 2016, 2017, 2018
(Galicia (Spain)) Racing de Ferrol	9	1959, 1964, 1965, 1981, 1988, 2001, 2005, 2007, 2022
(Galicia (Spain)) Celta de Vigo	6	1957, 1967, 1991, 1998, 2004, 2010
(Andalusia) Real Betis	2	1958, 1962
(Asturias) Sporting de Gijón	2	1970, 1971
(Community of Madrid) Real Madrid	2	1977, 1984
(Castile and León) Ponferradina	2	2013, 2019
(Basque Country (autonomous community)) Athletic Club	1	1953
(Valencian Community) Valencia	1	1954
(Region of Murcia) Real Murcia	1	1960
(Catalonia) Barcelona	1	1968
(Chile) Palestino	1	1975
(Canary Islands) Las Palmas	1	1976
(Valencian Community) Elche	1	1978
(Basque Country (autonomous community)) Real Sociedad	1	1979
(Castile and León) Salamanca	1	1989
(Galicia (Spain)) CD As Pontes	1	1992
(Galicia (Spain)) Compostela	1	1993
(England) Aston Villa	1	1994
(Netherlands) Ajax	1	1995
(Portugal) Porto	1	1997
(Castile and León) Real Valladolid	1	1999
(Andalusia) Recreativo de Huelva	1	2006
(Aragon) Real Zaragoza	1	2008
(Portugal) Río Ave	1	2009
(Galicia (Spain)) CD Lugo	1	2015

== See also ==
- Racing de Ferrol
