= Gerhard Harpers =

German footballer (1928–2016)

Personal information
- Full name: Gerhard Harpers
- Date of birth: 12 March 1928
- Place of birth: Bochum, Germany
- Date of death: 27 May 2016 (aged 88)
- Position: Midfielder

Senior career*
Years	Team	Apps	(Gls)
1945–1947	VfL Bochum		
1947–1956	SV Sodingen		
1956–1959	Fortuna Düsseldorf		

International career
1953–1955	West Germany	6	(0)
- * Club domestic league appearances and goals

Gerhard Harpers (12 March 1928 – 27 May 2016) was a German international footballer who played for VfL Bochum, SV Sodingen and Fortuna Düsseldorf.
