= John Buchanan (footballer, born 1935) =

Scottish footballer

Personal information
- Date of birth: 3 January 1935
- Place of birth: Edinburgh, Scotland
- Date of death: 1 September 2009 (aged 74)
- Place of death: Edinburgh, Scotland
- Position: Centre forward

Youth career
- –1954: Edinburgh Waverley

Senior career*
Years	Team	Apps	(Gls)
1954–1961	Hibernian	13	(6)
1961	Raith Rovers	8	(1)
1961–1962	Newport County	31	(7)
- * Club domestic league appearances and goals

John Buchanan (3 January 1935 – 1 September 2009) was a Scottish footballer, who played for Hibernian, Raith Rovers and Newport County in the 1950s and 1960s.

Buchanan, who was born and educated in Leith, played for youth side Edinburgh Waverley as a centre half. He signed for Hibs in 1954, and made his first team debut the same year, having been converted to the centre forward position. In 1955, he became the first player to score a goal on British soil in the first season of the European Cup, scoring the opening goal of a 1–1 draw in a first round tie between Hibs and Rot-Weiss Essen. Despite being a prolific goalscorer for Hibs' reserve team, Buchanan found difficulty in winning a place in the first team, as the club enjoyed the services of internationals Lawrie Reilly and Joe Baker. His time at Hibs was also interrupted by two years of National Service, which Buchanan spent with the Royal Artillery in Oswestry.

Buchanan's last first team appearance for Hibs was in a 2–1 defeat against Rangers at Ibrox in December 1960. He was then transferred to Raith Rovers, who he played for in the rest of the 1960–61 season. After a season in English football with Newport County, Buchanan returned to Scotland to play for Gala Fairydean, Duns and Hawick Royal Albert. After retiring as a player, he moved back to his native Edinburgh and became a taxi driver.

Buchanan died in September 2009 after suffering a long illness.
