= Willi Köchling =

German footballer

Personal information
- Full name: Willi Köchling
- Date of birth: 30 October 1924
- Place of birth: Schwerte, Germany
- Date of death: 29 January 2009 (aged 84)
- Position: Defender

Senior career*
Years	Team	Apps	(Gls)
1945–1946	VfL Schwerte		
1946–1951	TuS Iserlohn		
1951–1962	Rot-Weiss Essen		

International career
1956	West Germany	1	(0)
- * Club domestic league appearances and goals

Willi Köchling (30 October 1924 – 29 January 2009) was a German international footballer who played as a defender for VfL Schwerte, TuS Iserlohn and Rot-Weiss Essen.

== Honours ==
Rot-Weiss Essen

- DFB-Pokal: 1953
- German football championship: 1955
