= 1954–55 Oberliga =

Oberliga
- Season: 1954–55
- Champions: Hamburger SV Viktoria 89 Berlin Rot-Weiss Essen: 1. FC Kaiserslautern; Kickers Offenbach
- Relegated: Bremer SV Harburger TB BFC Südring BFC Nordstern Meidericher SV VfL Bochum FV Speyer Sportfreunde Saarbrücken KSV Hessen Kassel FC Bayern Munich
- German champions: Rot-Weiss Essen; 1st German title
- European Cup: Rot-Weiss Essen; 1. FC Saarbrücken
- Top goalscorer: Ernst-Otto Meyer (36 goals)

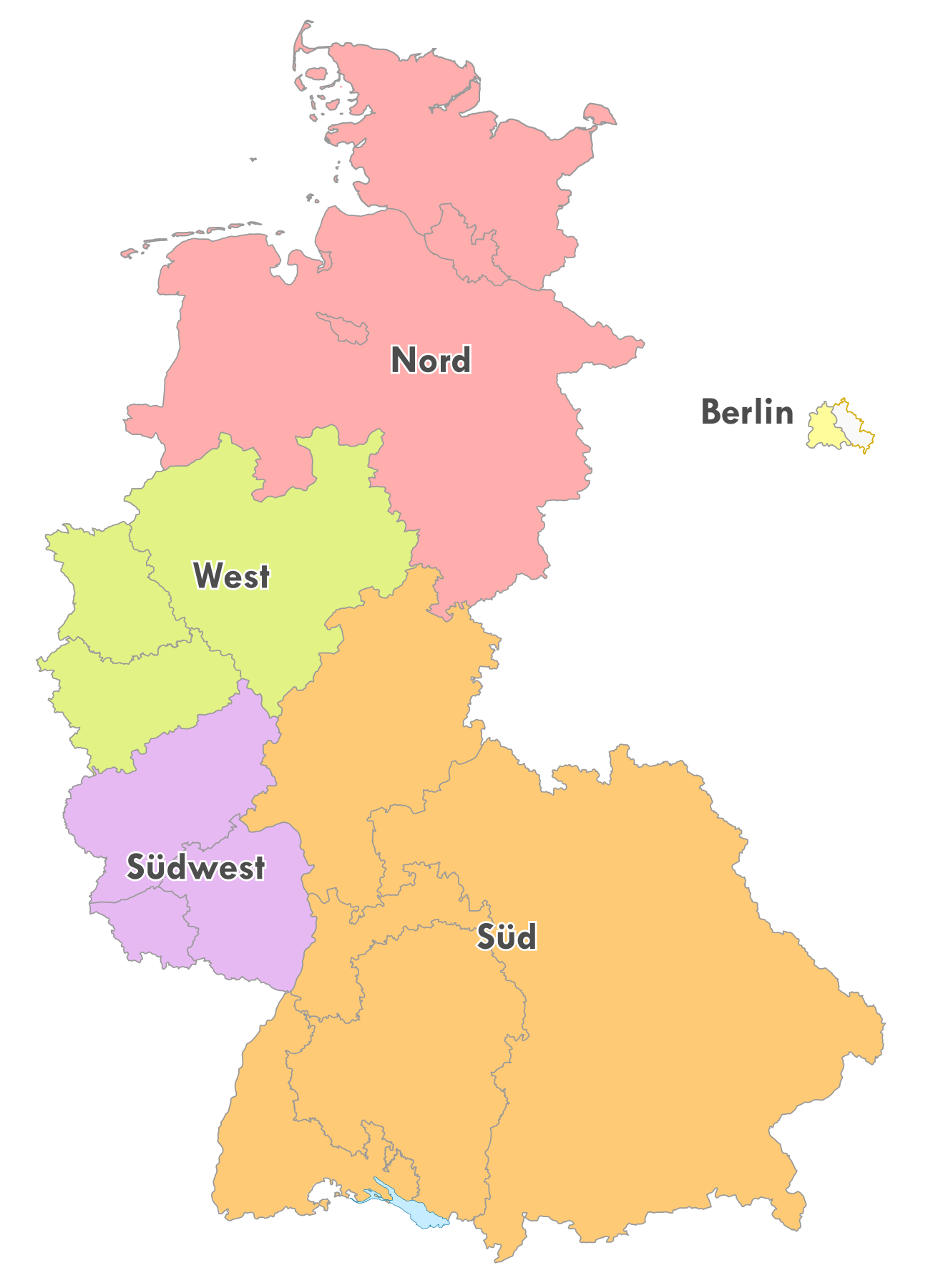
Map of the five German Oberligas 1945 to 1963

The 1954–55 Oberliga was the tenth season of the Oberliga, the first tier of the football league system in West Germany and the Saar Protectorate. The league operated in five regional divisions, Berlin, North, South, Southwest and West. The five league champions and the runners-up from the west, south, southwest and north then entered the 1955 German football championship which was won by Rot-Weiss Essen. It was Essen's sole national championship while, for losing finalist 1. FC Kaiserslautern, it was the fourth final it played in five seasons.

On the strength of this title Rot-Weiss Essen and 1. FC Saarbrücken, the best-placed Oberliga team from the Saar Protectorate, participated in the first edition of the European Cup, going out to Hibernian F.C. in the first round, as did Saarbrücken against AC Milan.

A similar-named league, the DDR-Oberliga, existed in East Germany, set at the first tier of the East German football league system. The 1954–55 DDR-Oberliga was won by SC Turbine Erfurt.

== Oberliga Nord ==
The 1954–55 season saw two new clubs in the league, VfL Wolfsburg and VfB Oldenburg, both promoted from the Amateurliga. The league's top scorer was Günter Schlegel of Hamburger SV with 30 goals.

| Pos | Team | Pld | W | D | L | GF | GA | GD | Pts | Promotion, qualification or relegation |
|---|---|---|---|---|---|---|---|---|---|---|
| 1 | Hamburger SV | 30 | 23 | 1 | 6 | 108 | 41 | +67 | 47 | Qualification to German championship |
| 2 | TuS Bremerhaven 93 | 30 | 17 | 7 | 6 | 56 | 38 | +18 | 41 | Qualification to German championship |
| 3 | Werder Bremen | 30 | 15 | 8 | 7 | 68 | 46 | +22 | 38 | |
| 4 | FC Altona 93 | 30 | 15 | 8 | 7 | 73 | 51 | +22 | 38 | |
| 5 | Hannover 96 | 30 | 14 | 6 | 10 | 52 | 41 | +11 | 34 | |
| 6 | Eintracht Braunschweig | 30 | 15 | 3 | 12 | 58 | 56 | +2 | 33 | |
| 7 | FC St. Pauli | 30 | 10 | 11 | 9 | 45 | 41 | +4 | 31 | |
| 8 | Eimsbütteler TV | 30 | 9 | 10 | 11 | 51 | 60 | −9 | 28 | |
| 9 | VfL Osnabrück | 30 | 9 | 9 | 12 | 58 | 55 | +3 | 27 | |
| 10 | Holstein Kiel | 30 | 8 | 11 | 11 | 52 | 64 | −12 | 27 | |
| 11 | VfB Oldenburg | 30 | 9 | 7 | 14 | 33 | 56 | −23 | 25 | |
| 12 | Arminia Hannover | 30 | 9 | 6 | 15 | 50 | 60 | −10 | 24 | |
| 13 | Göttingen 05 | 30 | 6 | 12 | 12 | 35 | 49 | −14 | 24 | |
| 14 | VfL Wolfsburg | 30 | 7 | 10 | 13 | 34 | 53 | −19 | 24 | |
| 15 | Bremer SV (R) | 30 | 9 | 5 | 16 | 35 | 56 | −21 | 23 | Relegation to Amateurliga |
| 16 | Harburger TB (R) | 30 | 3 | 10 | 17 | 35 | 76 | −41 | 16 | Relegation to Amateurliga |

Source: RSSSF.com
Rules for classification: 1) Points;
(R) Relegated

== Oberliga Berlin ==
The 1954–55 season saw two new clubs in the league, Hertha BSC Berlin and BFC Südring, both promoted from the Amateurliga Berlin. The league's top scorer was Werner Nocht of Viktoria 89 Berlin with 18 goals.

| Pos | Team | Pld | W | D | L | GF | GA | GD | Pts | Promotion, qualification or relegation |
|---|---|---|---|---|---|---|---|---|---|---|
| 1 | Viktoria 89 Berlin | 22 | 15 | 4 | 3 | 53 | 20 | +33 | 34 | Qualification to German championship |
| 2 | Tennis Borussia Berlin | 22 | 14 | 2 | 6 | 52 | 33 | +19 | 30 | |
| 3 | Berliner SV 92 | 22 | 12 | 4 | 6 | 38 | 26 | +12 | 28 | |
| 4 | Minerva 93 Berlin | 22 | 13 | 2 | 7 | 42 | 29 | +13 | 28 | |
| 5 | Union 06 Berlin | 22 | 11 | 3 | 8 | 42 | 37 | +5 | 25 | |
| 6 | Spandauer SV | 22 | 8 | 5 | 9 | 41 | 34 | +7 | 21 | |
| 7 | Hertha BSC Berlin | 22 | 10 | 1 | 11 | 37 | 44 | −7 | 21 | |
| 8 | Wacker 04 Berlin | 22 | 4 | 10 | 8 | 30 | 40 | −10 | 18 | |
| 9 | Alemannia 90 Berlin | 22 | 7 | 3 | 12 | 29 | 38 | −9 | 17 | |
| 10 | Blau-Weiß 90 Berlin | 22 | 6 | 5 | 11 | 24 | 45 | −21 | 17 | |
| 11 | BFC Südring (R) | 22 | 6 | 3 | 13 | 32 | 46 | −14 | 15 | Relegation to Amateurliga Berlin |
| 12 | BFC Nordstern (R) | 22 | 2 | 6 | 14 | 34 | 62 | −28 | 10 | Relegation to Amateurliga Berlin |

Source: RSSSF.com
Rules for classification: 1) Points;
(R) Relegated

== Oberliga West ==
The 1954–55 season saw two new clubs in the league, Westfalia Herne and Duisburger SV, both promoted from the 2. Oberliga West. The league's top scorer was Heinz Lorenz of Preußen Dellbrück with 23 goals.

| Pos | Team | Pld | W | D | L | GF | GA | GD | Pts | Promotion, qualification or relegation |
|---|---|---|---|---|---|---|---|---|---|---|
| 1 | Rot-Weiss Essen (C) | 30 | 20 | 5 | 5 | 64 | 38 | +26 | 45 | Qualification to German championship |
| 2 | SV Sodingen | 30 | 17 | 5 | 8 | 54 | 40 | +14 | 39 | Qualification to German championship |
| 3 | Bayer Leverkusen | 30 | 13 | 10 | 7 | 54 | 42 | +12 | 36 | |
| 4 | Borussia Dortmund | 30 | 12 | 6 | 12 | 63 | 57 | +6 | 30 | |
| 5 | FC Schalke 04 | 30 | 11 | 8 | 11 | 51 | 49 | +2 | 30 | |
| 6 | Fortuna Düsseldorf | 30 | 13 | 4 | 13 | 66 | 65 | +1 | 30 | |
| 7 | 1. FC Köln | 30 | 13 | 3 | 14 | 60 | 55 | +5 | 29 | |
| 8 | Duisburger SV | 30 | 12 | 5 | 13 | 48 | 52 | −4 | 29 | |
| 9 | Preußen Münster | 30 | 12 | 4 | 14 | 70 | 60 | +10 | 28 | |
| 10 | Preußen Dellbrück | 30 | 12 | 4 | 14 | 51 | 58 | −7 | 28 | |
| 11 | Alemannia Aachen | 30 | 11 | 6 | 13 | 56 | 64 | −8 | 28 | |
| 12 | Schwarz-Weiß Essen | 30 | 11 | 5 | 14 | 52 | 55 | −3 | 27 | |
| 13 | Westfalia Herne | 30 | 10 | 6 | 14 | 57 | 63 | −6 | 26 | |
| 14 | Borussia München-Gladbach | 30 | 9 | 8 | 13 | 48 | 65 | −17 | 26 | |
| 15 | Meidericher SV (R) | 30 | 10 | 6 | 14 | 39 | 60 | −21 | 26 | Relegation to 2. Oberliga West |
| 16 | VfL Bochum (R) | 30 | 6 | 11 | 13 | 36 | 46 | −10 | 23 | Relegation to 2. Oberliga West |

Source: RSSSF.com
Rules for classification: 1) Points;
(C) Champions; (R) Relegated

== Oberliga Südwest ==
The 1954–55 season saw two new clubs in the league, Eintracht Bad Kreuznach and Sportfreunde Saarbrücken, both promoted from the 2. Oberliga Südwest. The league's top scorer was Herbert Martin of 1. FC Saarbrücken with 27 goals.

| Pos | Team | Pld | W | D | L | GF | GA | GD | Pts | Promotion, qualification or relegation |
|---|---|---|---|---|---|---|---|---|---|---|
| 1 | 1. FC Kaiserslautern | 30 | 23 | 4 | 3 | 96 | 42 | +54 | 50 | Qualification to German championship |
| 2 | Wormatia Worms | 30 | 16 | 9 | 5 | 80 | 38 | +42 | 41 | Qualification to German championship |
| 3 | 1. FC Saarbrücken | 30 | 18 | 5 | 7 | 82 | 52 | +30 | 41 | Qualification for the European Cup first round |
| 4 | TuS Neuendorf | 30 | 17 | 6 | 7 | 79 | 38 | +41 | 40 | |
| 5 | FK Pirmasens | 30 | 18 | 3 | 9 | 70 | 45 | +25 | 39 | |
| 6 | Phönix Ludwigshafen | 30 | 15 | 9 | 6 | 60 | 39 | +21 | 39 | |
| 7 | TuRa Ludwigshafen | 30 | 14 | 6 | 10 | 57 | 52 | +5 | 34 | |
| 8 | VfR Frankenthal | 30 | 13 | 3 | 14 | 47 | 66 | −19 | 29 | |
| 9 | Saar 05 Saarbrücken | 30 | 6 | 13 | 11 | 43 | 56 | −13 | 25 | |
| 10 | Borussia Neunkirchen | 30 | 8 | 9 | 13 | 37 | 50 | −13 | 25 | |
| 11 | Eintracht Trier | 30 | 10 | 4 | 16 | 45 | 59 | −14 | 24 | |
| 12 | VfR Kaiserslautern | 30 | 8 | 6 | 16 | 47 | 76 | −29 | 22 | |
| 13 | Eintracht Kreuznach | 30 | 7 | 7 | 16 | 43 | 75 | −32 | 21 | |
| 14 | FSV Mainz 05 | 30 | 8 | 4 | 18 | 51 | 64 | −13 | 20 | |
| 15 | FV Speyer (R) | 30 | 6 | 5 | 19 | 45 | 70 | −25 | 17 | Relegation to 2. Oberliga Südwest |
| 16 | Sportfreunde Saarbrücken (R) | 30 | 4 | 5 | 21 | 31 | 92 | −61 | 13 | Relegation to 2. Oberliga Südwest |

Source: RSSSF.com
Rules for classification: 1) Points;
(R) Relegated

== Oberliga Süd ==
The 1954–55 season saw two new clubs in the league, SSV Reutlingen and Schwaben Augsburg, both promoted from the 2. Oberliga Süd. The league's top scorer was Ernst-Otto Meyer of VfR Mannheim with 36 goals, a title he would take out twice more, in 1955–56 and 1958–59. Meyer was also the top scorer for all five Oberligas in 1954–55.

| Pos | Team | Pld | W | D | L | GF | GA | GD | Pts | Promotion, qualification or relegation |
|---|---|---|---|---|---|---|---|---|---|---|
| 1 | Kickers Offenbach | 30 | 17 | 5 | 8 | 67 | 38 | +29 | 39 | Qualification to German championship |
| 2 | SSV Reutlingen | 30 | 16 | 5 | 9 | 62 | 44 | +18 | 37 | Qualification to German championship |
| 3 | FC Schweinfurt 05 | 30 | 14 | 9 | 7 | 52 | 44 | +8 | 37 | |
| 4 | Eintracht Frankfurt | 30 | 15 | 6 | 9 | 56 | 36 | +20 | 36 | |
| 5 | Karlsruher SC | 30 | 15 | 5 | 10 | 69 | 51 | +18 | 35 | |
| 6 | FSV Frankfurt | 30 | 13 | 7 | 10 | 55 | 49 | +6 | 33 | |
| 7 | BC Augsburg | 30 | 14 | 4 | 12 | 72 | 60 | +12 | 32 | |
| 8 | Schwaben Augsburg | 30 | 12 | 8 | 10 | 46 | 45 | +1 | 32 | |
| 9 | 1. FC Nürnberg | 30 | 12 | 5 | 13 | 64 | 51 | +13 | 29 | |
| 10 | VfR Mannheim | 30 | 12 | 5 | 13 | 77 | 79 | −2 | 29 | |
| 11 | SpVgg Fürth | 30 | 11 | 7 | 12 | 56 | 67 | −11 | 29 | |
| 12 | Stuttgarter Kickers | 30 | 10 | 7 | 13 | 48 | 56 | −8 | 27 | |
| 13 | VfB Stuttgart | 30 | 11 | 4 | 15 | 58 | 60 | −2 | 26 | |
| 14 | Jahn Regensburg | 30 | 11 | 4 | 15 | 47 | 85 | −38 | 26 | |
| 15 | KSV Hessen Kassel (R) | 30 | 6 | 6 | 18 | 37 | 67 | −30 | 18 | Relegation to 2. Oberliga Süd |
| 16 | FC Bayern Munich (R) | 30 | 6 | 3 | 21 | 42 | 76 | −34 | 15 | Relegation to 2. Oberliga Süd |

Source: RSSSF.com
Rules for classification: 1) Points;
(R) Relegated

== German championship ==
The 1955 German football championship was contested by the nine qualified Oberliga teams and won by Rot-Weiss Essen, defeating 1. FC Kaiserslautern in the final. The runners-up of the Oberligas, except Berlin, played pre-qualifying matches to determine which three of the four would go on to the group stage. The remaining eight clubs then played a home-and-away round of matches in two groups of four. The two group winners then advanced to the final.

=== Qualifying ===
==== First round ====
| Team 1 | Score | Team 2 |
|---|---|---|
| SV Sodingen | 3–0 | SSV Reutlingen |

| Team 1 | Score | Team 2 |
|---|---|---|
| TuS Bremerhaven 93 | 3–3 aet | Wormatia Worms |

Replay

| Team 1 | Score | Team 2 |
|---|---|---|
| TuS Bremerhaven 93 | 3–2 | Wormatia Worms |

==== Second round ====
| Team 1 | Score | Team 2 |
|---|---|---|
| Wormatia Worms | 2–1 | SSV Reutlingen |

=== Group 1 ===
| Pos | Team | Pld | W | D | L | GF | GA | GD | Pts | Promotion, qualification or relegation |
|---|---|---|---|---|---|---|---|---|---|---|
| 1 | 1. FC Kaiserslautern (Q) | 6 | 3 | 3 | 0 | 20 | 8 | +12 | 9 | Qualified to final |
| 2 | Hamburger SV | 6 | 3 | 2 | 1 | 8 | 5 | +3 | 8 | |
| 3 | SV Sodingen | 6 | 2 | 3 | 1 | 13 | 9 | +4 | 7 | |
| 4 | Viktoria 89 Berlin | 6 | 0 | 0 | 6 | 4 | 23 | −19 | 0 | |

Source: RSSSF.com
Rules for classification: 1) Points;
(Q) Qualified for the phase indicated

=== Group 2 ===
| Pos | Team | Pld | W | D | L | GF | GA | GD | Pts | Promotion, qualification or relegation |
|---|---|---|---|---|---|---|---|---|---|---|
| 1 | Rot-Weiss Essen (Q) | 6 | 4 | 2 | 0 | 16 | 5 | +11 | 10 | Qualified to final |
| 2 | TuS Bremerhaven 93 | 6 | 2 | 2 | 2 | 5 | 10 | −5 | 6 | |
| 3 | Kickers Offenbach | 6 | 2 | 0 | 4 | 11 | 12 | −1 | 4 | |
| 4 | Wormatia Worms | 6 | 1 | 2 | 3 | 6 | 11 | −5 | 4 | |

Source: RSSSF.com
Rules for classification: 1) Points;
(Q) Qualified for the phase indicated

=== Final ===
| Team 1 | Score | Team 2 |
|---|---|---|
| Rot-Weiss Essen | 4–3 | 1. FC Kaiserslautern |
