= Colin McDonald (footballer, born 1930) =

English goalkeeper (1930–2026)

- McDonald in 1958

Personal information
- Full name: Colin Agnew McDonald
- Date of birth: 15 October 1930
- Place of birth: Summerseat, England
- Date of death: 1 January 2026 (aged 95)
- Height: 6 ft 1 1/2 in (1.87 m)
- Position: Goalkeeper

Senior career*
Years	Team	Apps	(Gls)
1948–1950	Burnley	0	(0)
1950–1951	Headington United	30	(0)
1951–1961	Burnley	186	(0)
1965	Altrincham		

International career
1958	England	8	(0)

Managerial career
- 1961: Wycombe Wanderers
- * Club domestic league appearances and goals

Colin Agnew McDonald (15 October 1930 – 1 January 2026) was an English footballer who played as a goalkeeper for Burnley from 1948 to 1950 and from 1951 to 1961. He made 201 appearances in total with the club, until a leg injury in 1959 forced his retirement as a professional player. He is regarded as one of the greatest goalkeepers in Burnley's history, and finished in 11th place in the 1958 Ballon d'Or rankings.

McDonald won eight caps for England, including four appearances in the 1958 FIFA World Cup, and was a member of the team that won the 1958–59 British Home Championship. From June 2024 until his death, he was the oldest living England international footballer.

After retiring from playing, McDonald briefly managed Wycombe Wanderers in 1961 before moving into scouting, youth football and football administration. He held roles at Bury, Bolton Wanderers, Oldham Athletic and Tranmere Rovers, and developed a reputation as one of English football's leading scouts. He has been credited with discovering Colin Bell, Terry McDermott and Andy Goram.

== Early life ==
McDonald was born on 15 October 1930 in Summerseat to Scottish parents. His father, Tom McDonald, was a goalkeeper for Motherwell, Portsmouth and Bury. According to one newspaper, Tom was close to being called up for the Scotland national team before he went to Bury.

== Club career ==
McDonald began his footballing career at Hawkshaw St Mary's, a local Sunday School League side in Bury, where he played as a left winger before switching to goalkeeper. In 1948, he was scouted by former Burnley player Jack Marshall and the club offered McDonald a trial. He joined Burnley on an amateur basis and initially played for the club's reserve team, while also completing his apprenticeship as a plumber. In 1950, he was called up for National Service, playing for Headington United during his time at the Royal Air Force. In the 1951–52 FA Cup, he helped Headington defeat Wycombe Wanderers in a second qualifying round game. Wycombe subsequently lodged a protest, claiming that McDonald was ineligible because he was registered with Burnley and that Headington had failed to obtain Burnley's permission to field him in the Cup. The Football Association awarded the tie to Wycombe, and Headington were eliminated from the competition.

He returned to Burnley in 1951, and signed a professional contract with the club a year later, making his first-team debut at the end of the 1953–54 season in an away match at Aston Villa. He remained Burnley's first-choice goalkeeper the following seasons, in which the team never finished outside the top ten of the First Division. The broken leg that would ultimately end his professional career came in an accidental clash with Liam Tuohy in a game between the Football League and League of Ireland at Dalymount Park in March 1959. McDonald suffered a double fracture of his left shin, and complications followed when the plaster was applied too tightly, leading to a blood clot that travelled to his lung and nearly proved fatal. Further complications and pneumonia hindered his recovery back to full fitness.

Burnley were crowned champions of England in 1959–60, while McDonald did not make a single appearance; he instead played for the club's reserve team. In 1961, he left Burnley and retired, although he made a brief comeback as a player at non-League side Altrincham in 1965. McDonald also played cricket for Tottington St John's in the North Manchester League; in 1965, he had 123 not outs, the highest score in the competition's history.

== International career ==
McDonald made his England national football team debut in May 1958 in a 1–1 draw with the Soviet Union before a crowd of 104,000 in Moscow. He would play eight games in total for England, including all four matches in the 1958 FIFA World Cup, keeping a clean sheet against eventual champions Brazil. McDonald was voted as the tournament's best goalkeeper (along with Harry Gregg of Northern Ireland), and finished in 11th place in the 1958 Ballon d'Or rankings, an award given to the best European player. He also won two caps during the 1958–59 British Home Championship, which England won (shared with Northern Ireland). The Times later wrote that McDonald "would have been expected to win many more than his eight caps had disaster not struck in 1959".

== Later life and death ==
Shortly after his departure from Burnley in 1961, McDonald was appointed manager at Wycombe Wanderers but resigned after just 23 days due to "domestic reasons". He later worked for the Spastics Society and was a scout for Bury and Bolton Wanderers. At Bury, he discovered Colin Bell, Alec Lindsay and Terry McDermott, and set up a scouting network which saw several players progress and be sold on for large fees. During the late 1960s and the early 1970s, he was the club's administration manager and subsequently the general manager. He left Bury for Oldham Athletic in 1972, working in the club's youth department and as a scout. At Boundary Park, he discovered players such as Simon Stainrod and Andy Goram. The Manchester Evening News named McDonald "the man widely regarded as one of the best chief scouts in English soccer". He quit his role at Oldham in 1984 and moved to Tranmere Rovers, taking up the role of head of youth development. His contract was terminated by Tranmere in 1987 as a result of cost-cutting measures. He subsequently retired but remained a devoted Burnley fan.

McDonald died on 1 January 2026, at the age of 95. From June 2024 until his death, he was the oldest living England international footballer.

== Legacy ==
In 2004, former Burnley player Martin Dobson, writing in the Lancashire Telegraph, named McDonald the club's "best ever goalkeeper". Dobson added that McDonald "had all the attributes of a top class keeper. He was brave, commanded his box, was dominant in the air, had great hands and gave confidence to his team-mates." This view was later echoed by Burnley F.C. historian Ray Simpson, who named McDonald "one of Burnley's finest-ever keepers, and arguably the best of them all". The Times praised his positioning and handling, along with his calmness.

== Career statistics ==
Appearances and goals by club, season and competition
Club	Season	League			FA Cup		Total	
Club	Season	Division	Apps	Goals	Apps	Goals	Apps	Goals
Burnley	1953–54	First Division	5	0	0	0	5	0
Burnley	1954–55	First Division	39	0	1	0	40	0
Burnley	1955–56	First Division	42	0	6	0	48	0
Burnley	1956–57	First Division	34	0	0	0	34	0
Burnley	1957–58	First Division	39	0	3	0	42	0
Burnley	1958–59	First Division	27	0	5	0	32	0
Total			186	0	15	0	201	0

== Honours ==
England

- British Home Championship: 1958–59
