= August Gottschalk =

German footballer

Personal information
- Full name: August Gottschalk
- Date of birth: 14 December 1921
- Place of birth: Essen, Germany
- Date of death: 27 November 2014 (aged 92)
- Place of death: Essen, Germany
- Position: Forward

Youth career
- –1939: Preußen Essen

Senior career*
Years	Team	Apps	(Gls)
1939–1945	Rot-Weiss Essen		
1945–1946	Preußen Essen		
1946–1955	Rot-Weiss Essen		

Managerial career
- 1955–1956: SV Borbeck
- BV Altenessen 06
- * Club domestic league appearances and goals

August Gottschalk (Essen, 14 December 1921 – Essen, 27 November 2014) was a German footballer who played as a forward.

== Biography ==
He debuted professionally in 1939 with Rot-Weiss Essen. In his first stint with the club, he played for six seasons. He left the club in 1945 to play for a year for Preußen Essen. At the end of the 1945/1946 season, he returned to the Rot-Weiss Essen, where he played for another nine seasons. In this second stint with Rot-Weiss Essen he scored 99 goals in 186 matches. He was captain of the team when it won the DFB-Pokal in 1953 and Bundesliga championship in 1955.
