= 1958 Ballon d'Or =

Annual football award event in France

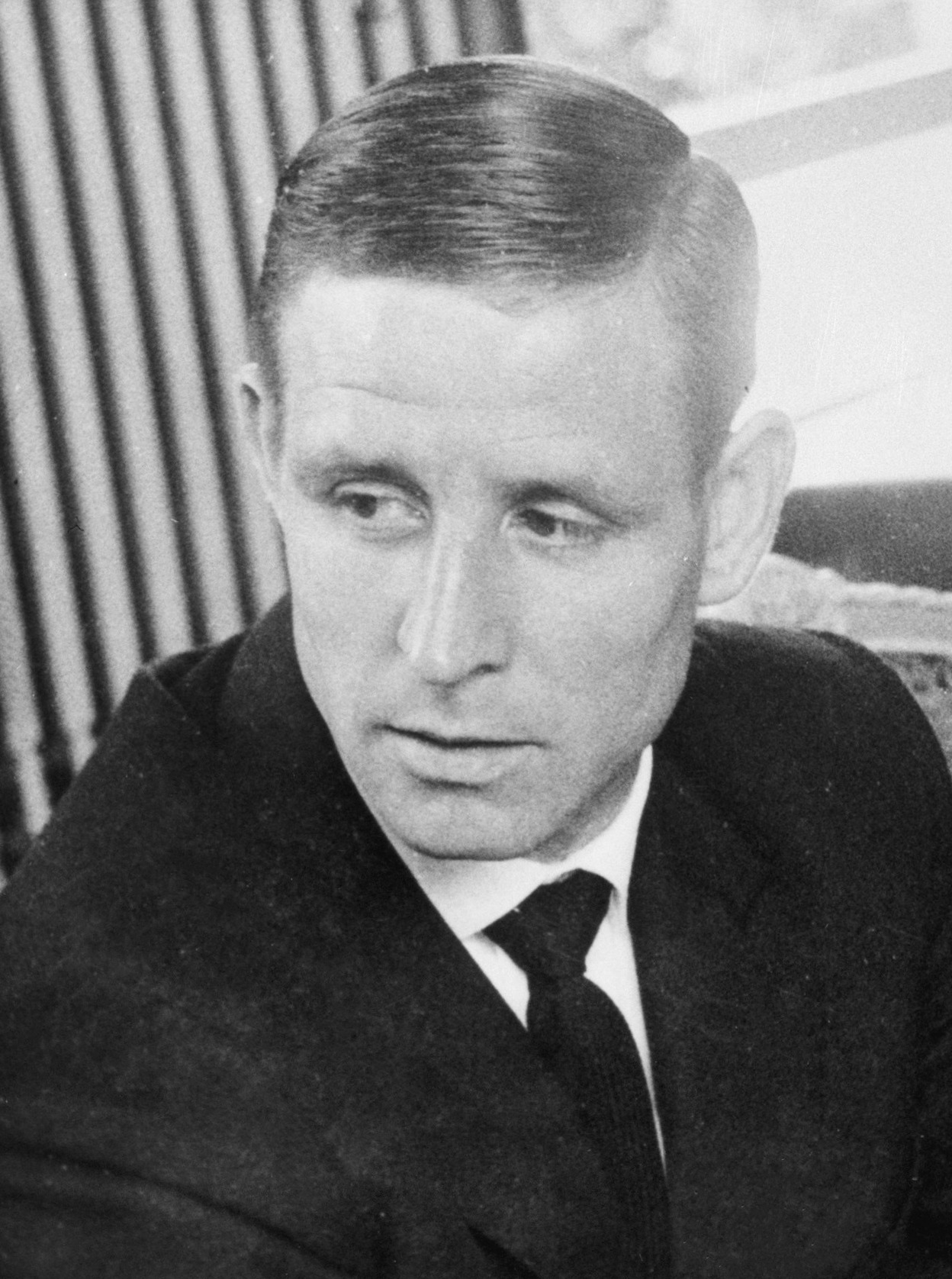
- 1958 Ballon d'Or winner, Raymond Kopa in 1963
- Date: 16 December 1958
- Location: Paris, France
- Presented by: France Football

Highlights
- Won by: (France) Raymond Kopa (1st award)
- Website: ballondor.com

The 1958 Ballon d'Or, given to the best football player in Europe as judged by a panel of sports journalists from UEFA member countries, was awarded to Raymond Kopa on 16 December 1958.

== Rankings ==
Rank	Name	Club(s)	Nationality	Points
1	Raymond Kopa	(Spain) Real Madrid	France	71
2	Helmut Rahn	(West Germany) Rot-Weiss Essen	West Germany	40
3	Just Fontaine	(France) Reims	France	23
4	John Charles	(Italy) Juventus	Wales	15
4	Kurt Hamrin	(Italy) Padova (Italy) Fiorentina	Sweden	15
6	Billy Wright	(England) Wolverhampton Wanderers	England	9
7	Johnny Haynes	(England) Fulham	England	7
8	Harry Gregg	(England) Manchester United	Northern Ireland	6
8	Nils Liedholm	(Italy) Milan	Sweden	6
8	Horst Szymaniak	(West Germany) Wuppertaler SV	West Germany	6
11	Colin McDonald	(England) Burnley	England	5
12	Paco Gento	(Spain) Real Madrid	Spain	4
12	Gunnar Gren	(Sweden) Örgryte IS	Sweden	4
14	Vujadin Boškov	(Socialist Federal Republic of Yugoslavia) Vojvodina	Yugoslavia	3
14	Bengt Gustavsson	(Italy) Atalanta	Sweden	3
14	Valentin Ivanov	(Soviet Union) Torpedo Moskva	Soviet Union	3
14	Luis Suárez	(Spain) Barcelona	Spain	3
14	Lev Yashin	(Soviet Union) Dynamo Moscow	Soviet Union	3
19	Orvar Bergmark	(Sweden) Örebro SK	Sweden	2
19	Danny Blanchflower	(England) Tottenham Hotspur	Northern Ireland	2
19	Ivan Kolev	(Bulgaria) CDNA Sofia	Bulgaria	2
19	Bruno Nicolè	(Italy) Juventus	Italy	2
19	Ladislav Novák	(Czechoslovakia) Dukla Prague	Czechoslovakia	2
19	Lennart Skoglund	(Italy) Internazionale	Sweden	2
25	Giampiero Boniperti	(Italy) Juventus	Italy	1
25	Gerhard Hanappi	(Austria) Rapid Wien	Austria	1
