= Frank Islacker =

German footballer

Personal information
- Date of birth: 29 August 1963 (age 63)
- Height: 1.74 m (5 ft 9 in)
- Position: Forward

Senior career*
Years	Team	Apps	(Gls)
1982–1983	VfL Bochum	3	(0)
- * Club domestic league appearances and goals

Frank Islacker (born 29 August 1963) is a German former professional footballer who played as a forward. At age 19, Islacker was forced to retire after suffering a severe knee injury. He is the son of Franz Islacker and the father of Mandy Islacker.

== Career statistics ==
Club performance			League		Cup		Total	
Season	Club	League	Apps	Goals	Apps	Goals	Apps	Goals
Germany			League		DFB-Pokal		Total	
1982–83	VfL Bochum	Bundesliga	3	0	0	0	3	0
Total	Germany		3	0	0	0	3	0
Career total			3	0	0	0	3	0
