= Castaño (footballer) =

Spanish footballer (1933–2019)

Personal information
- Full name: Eliodoro Castaño Pedrosa
- Date of birth: 5 April 1933
- Place of birth: Ksar el-Kebir, Morocco
- Date of death: 26 September 2019 (aged 85)
- Place of death: Valencia, Spain
- Position: Forward

Senior career*
Years	Team	Apps	(Gls)
1955–1956	Real Madrid	13	(6)
1956–1957	Real Jaén	4	(0)
1958–1962	Real Betis	42	(16)
1962–1963	Córdoba	1	(0)
Total		64	(22)
- * Club domestic league appearances and goals

Eliodoro Castaño Pedrosa (5 April 1933 – 26 September 2019), commonly known as Castaño, was a Spanish footballer who played as a forward, notably for Real Madrid between 1955 and 1956 as part of the team that won the inaugural European Cup. He scored twice in a 4–0 quarter-final win against FK Partizan.

== Career ==
Castaño was born in the Spanish city of Alacazarquivir, now known as Ksar el-Kebir in modern day Morocco, on 5 April 1933.

Castaño played 13 times for Real Madrid scoring 4 goals in the 1955–56 La Liga season and made 2 appearances in the 1955–56 European Cup competition, that Real Madrid would go on to win, scoring twice; before moving on to play for Real Leon. After just one season with the first ever European Champions, Castaño moved to newly promoted side Real Jaen who were competing in La Liga for just the second time in the club's history. Castaño made six appearances for the Andalusian based side, failing to find the net. Castaño then moved on again in 1958 joining Real Betis where he made 42 appearances in four seasons, scoring 16 times. In 1962 Castaño moved to play for Cordoba CF where he made just a single, goalless appearance.

Castaño died on 26 September 2019 at the age of 86.

== Honours ==
Real Madrid

- European Cup: 1956
