= Clemens Wientjes =

German footballer

Personal information
- Full name: Clemens Wientjes
- Date of birth: 8 February 1920
- Place of birth: Germany
- Date of death: March 1998 (aged 78)
- Position: Midfielder

Senior career*
Years	Team	Apps	(Gls)
1941–1945	1. FC Nürnberg		
1945–1947	Werden 08		
1947–1955	Rot-Weiss Essen		

International career
1952	West Germany	2	(0)
- * Club domestic league appearances and goals

Clemens Wientjes (8 February 1920 – 1998) was a German international footballer who played for 1. FC Nürnberg and Rot-Weiss Essen.
