= Helmut Rahn =

German footballer (1929–2003)

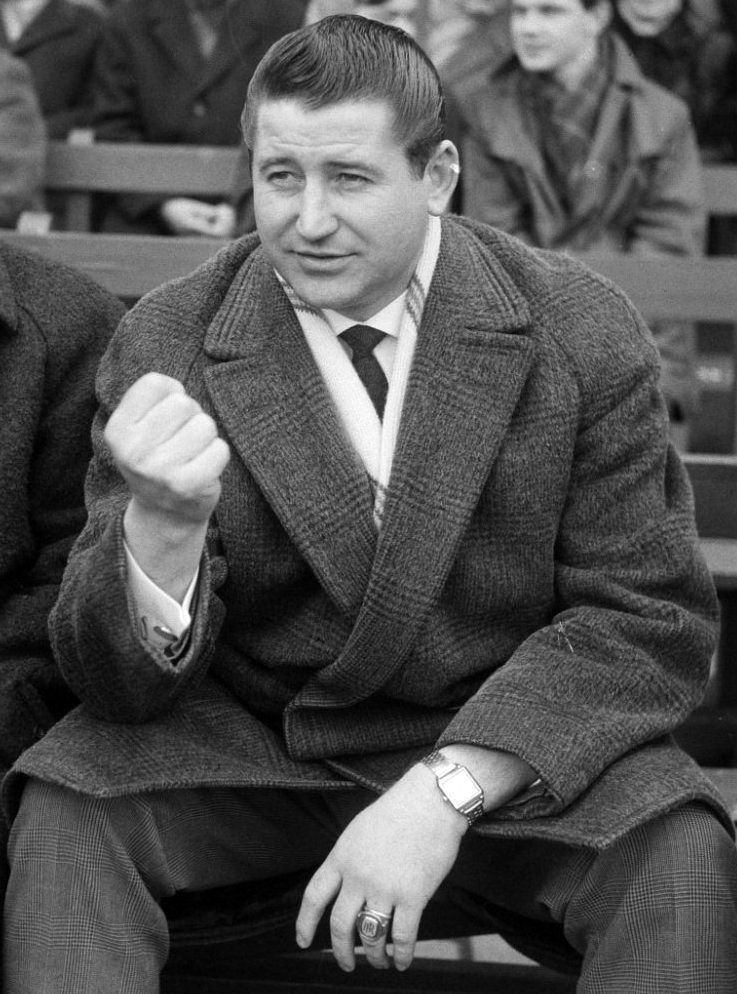
- Rahn in 1962

Personal information
- Date of birth: 16 August 1929
- Place of birth: Essen, Germany
- Date of death: 14 August 2003 (aged 73)
- Place of death: Essen, Germany
- Height: 1.78 m (5 ft 10 in)
- Position: Outside forward

Youth career
- 1938–1946: SV Altenessen 1912

Senior career*
Years	Team	Apps	(Gls)
1946–1950	SC Oelde 1919		
1950–1951	Sportfreunde Katernberg	30	(7)
1951–1959	Rot-Weiss Essen	280	(97)
1959–1960	1. FC Köln	29	(11)
1960–1963	SC Enschede	69	(39)
1963–1965	Meidericher SV	19	(8)
Total		427	(162)

International career
1951–1960	West Germany	40	(21)
Medal record
Men's football
Representing West Germany
FIFA World Cup
Winner	1954 Switzerland
- * Club domestic league appearances and goals

Helmut Rahn (16 August 1929 – 14 August 2003), known as Der Boss (The Boss), was a German footballer who played as a forward. He became a legend for having scored the winning goal in the final of the 1954 FIFA World Cup (West Germany vs. Hungary 3–2). Rahn, along with the German team, were decorated by the President of the Federal Republic of Germany in 1972.

== Career ==
Rahn started his career with Altenessen 1912 where he played from 1938 until 1946. Then he went to SC Oelde 09 with a total score of 52 goals for that team. In the 1950–51 season, he played for Sportfreunde Katernberg.

He was most successful when he played for Rot-Weiss Essen from 1951 to 1959. The team won the DFB-Pokal final in 1953 and won the German Championship in 1955. For one year, from 1959 till 1960 he had played at 1. FC Köln, 1960 he went to Sportclub Enschede in the Netherlands.

In the Bundesliga 1963 he started playing for MSV Duisburg. He finished his career in 1965 because of a knee problem and, along with Hans Schäfer was one of the last members of the 1954 World Cup winning side to retire. His position was that of an outside right.

His legendary status in German football was sparked by the heroic achievement of the German team in the final of the 1954 World Cup. Germany, whose team members themselves were surprised to be in the final, was playing Hungary, who hadn't lost a single match for four years running up to the World Cup final, and had already beaten Germany 8–3 in the group stage earlier in the tournament. Germany lagged behind 0–2 after only eight minutes, but then pulled it back to 2–2 with Rahn assisting the first German goal and scoring the second. With six minutes remaining, Rahn received the ball just outside the penalty box before going past a Hungarian player and managing to shoot at the lower left corner with his weaker left foot just before being tackled. The ball whistled into the back of the net and Germany went on to win the game 3–2 over the apparently unbeatable Hungarian team. This match is known in Germany as The Miracle of Bern (Das Wunder von Bern) because of its "David versus Goliath"-like setting, and it is generally seen as an instrumental part of the rebuilding of the German people's morale after World War II.

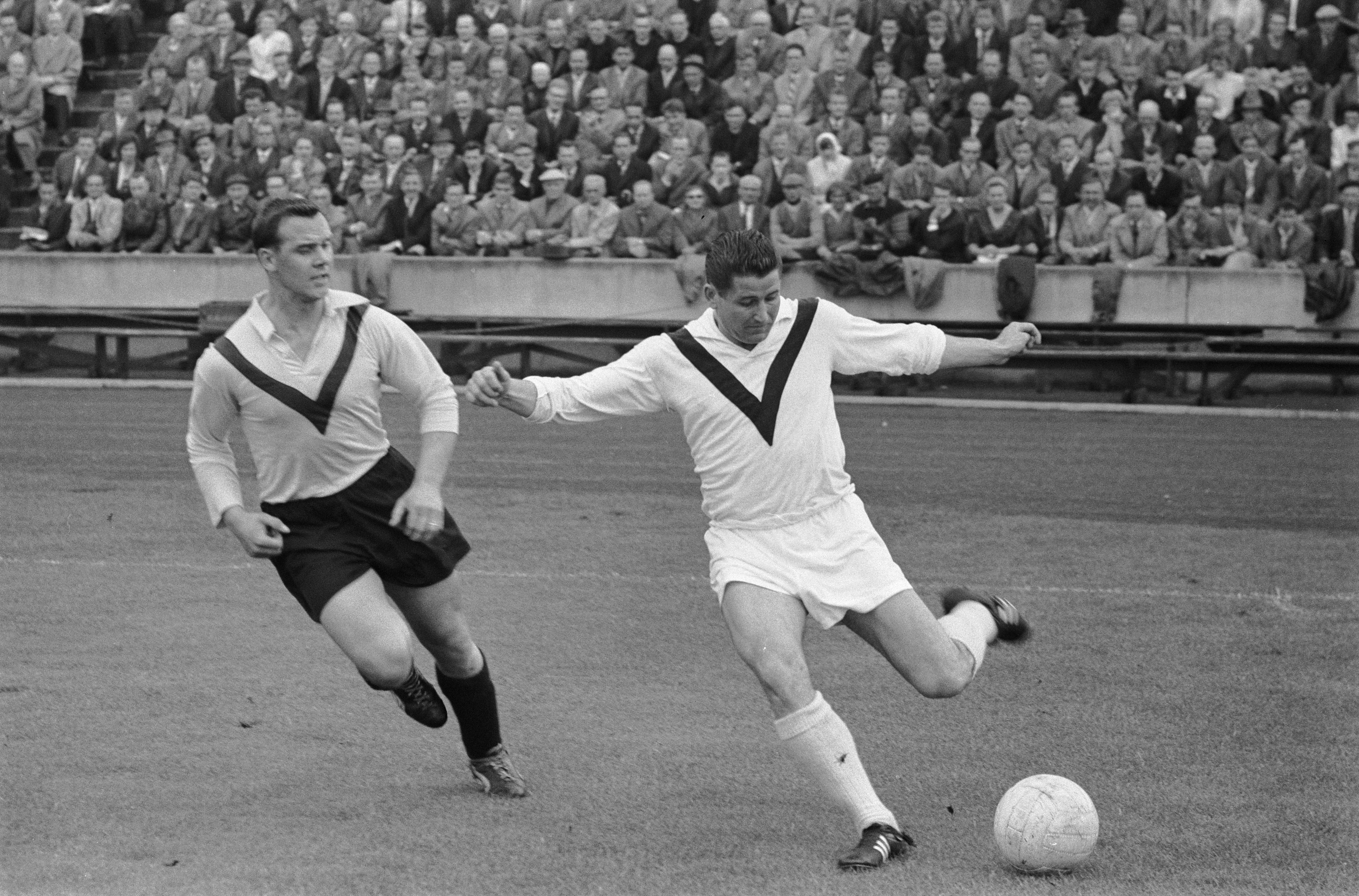
Rahn (right) playing for Dutch club Enschede in 1960

Rahn was also part of the German team that reached semifinals at the 1958 World Cup. With his goal against Yugoslavia, he became at the time the third maximum scorer in World Cups, with 10 total goals (behind Just Fontaine and Sándor Kocsis), and also the first player ever to score at least four goals in two different World Cups.

Rahn played 40 international matches and scored a total of 21 goals. He was known as "Der Boss" ("The Boss") because of his on-field leadership and occasionally as "The Cannon from Essen".

== Later life ==
After retiring from football, Rahn started his own car dealership in Essen-Altenessen, along Altenessener Street. He was known for his good sense of humour and his joy and ability at talking with others. Many stories about him still circulate throughout Essen. One such story involves a discussion he once had with a friend regarding his car dealership:

Rahn was once asked by a friend, how his car dealership worked. His very direct answer: "I buy a car for 1,000 DM and sell it for 4,000 DM. And I live off the three percent profit."

He died two days shy of his 74th birthday, in Essen. The film The Miracle of Bern was dedicated to him by director Sönke Wortmann.

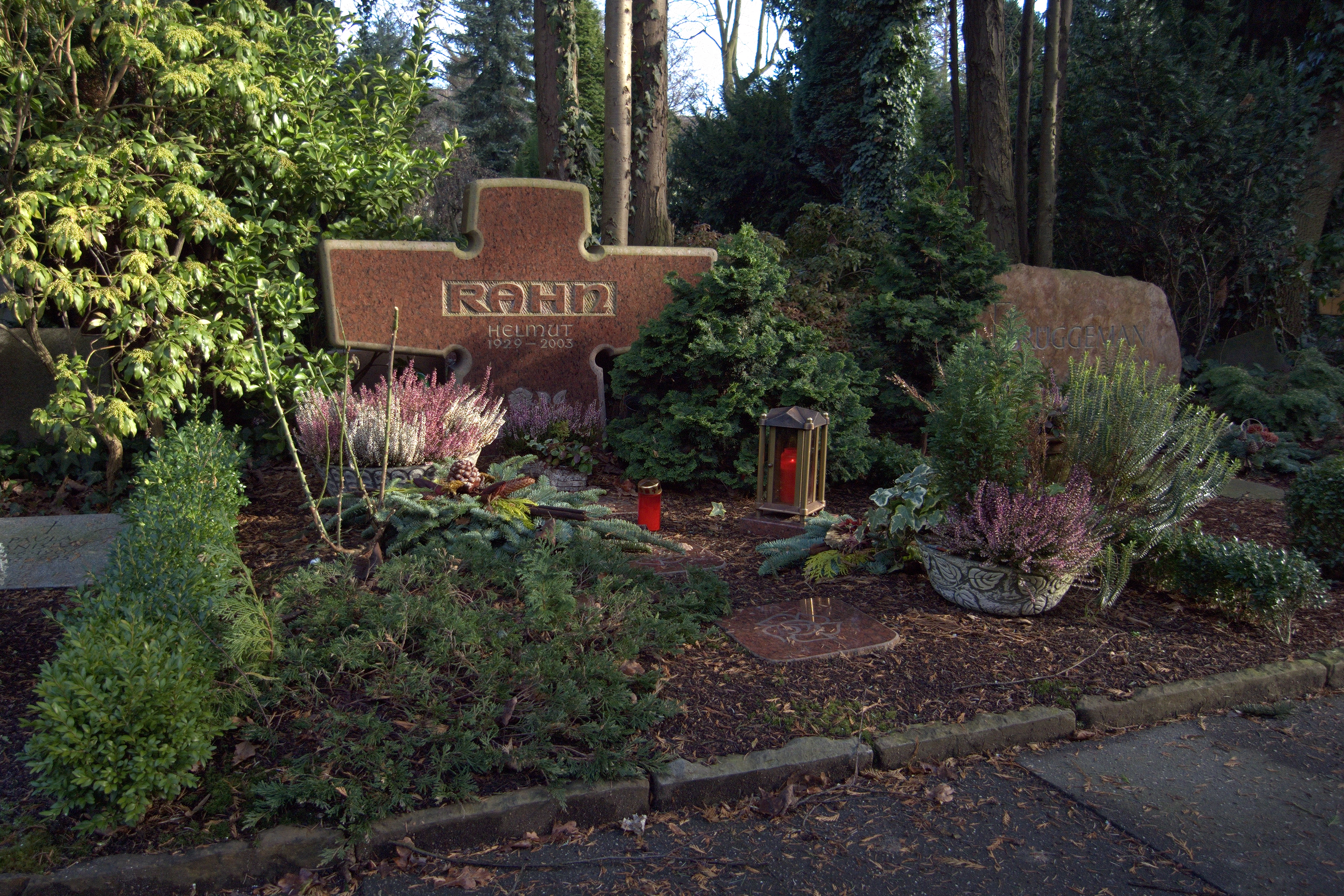
The tomb of Helmut Rahn

== Family ==
In 1953, Rahn married Gerti Seller, and the couple had two sons, Uwe (born 1954) and Klaus Rahn. Rahn is allegedly the cousin of the grandfather of Kevin-Prince Boateng of the Ghana national football team.

== Helmut Rahn Memorial ==
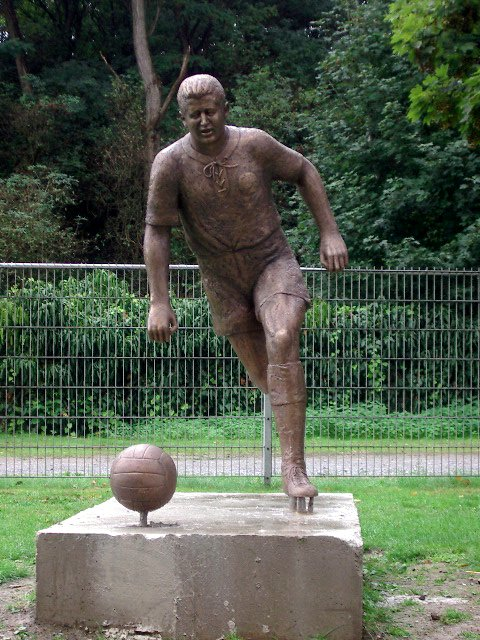
The Helmut Rahn Memorial

On 11 July 2004, 50 years after the Bern match, a lifesize statue of Rahn was put up near Georg-Melches-Stadium in Essen, on the square named after him.

== Career statistics ==
=== Club ===
Appearances and goals by club, season and competition
Club	Season	League			German Champ'ship		Total	
Club	Season	Division	Apps	Goals	Apps	Goals	Apps	Goals
Sportfreunde Katernberg	1950–51	Oberliga West	30	7	—		30	7
Rot-Weiss Essen	1951–52	Oberliga West	29	20	6	5	35	25
Rot-Weiss Essen	1952–53	Oberliga West	28	9	—		28	9
Rot-Weiss Essen	1953–54	Oberliga West	30	18	—		30	18
Rot-Weiss Essen	1954–55	Oberliga West	19	5	4	1	23	6
Rot-Weiss Essen	1955–56	Oberliga West	24	9	—		24	9
Rot-Weiss Essen	1956–57	Oberliga West	21	10	—		21	10
Rot-Weiss Essen	1957–58	Oberliga West	27	8	—		27	8
Rot-Weiss Essen	1958–59	Oberliga West	23	9	—		23	9
Rot-Weiss Essen	Total		201	88	10	6	211	94
1. FC Köln	1959–60	Oberliga West	29	11	7	4	36	15
SC Enschede	1960–61	Eredivisie	27	14	—		27	14
SC Enschede	1961–62	Eredivisie	21	12	—		21	12
SC Enschede	1962–63	Eredivisie	21	13	—		21	13
SC Enschede	Total		69	39	—		69	39
Meidericher SV	1963–64	Bundesliga	18	8	—		18	8
Meidericher SV	1964–65	Bundesliga	1	0	—		1	0
Meidericher SV	Total		19	8	—		19	8
Career total			348	153	17	10	365	163

=== International ===
Appearances and goals by national team and year
National team	Year	Apps	Goals
Germany	1951	2	1
Germany	1952	3	1
Germany	1953	4	1
Germany	1954	6	4
Germany	1955	3	0
Germany	1956	1	0
Germany	1957	3	2
Germany	1958	11	10
Germany	1959	5	1
Germany	1960	2	1
Total		40	21

Scores and results list West Germany's goal tally first, score column indicates score after each Rahn goal.

List of international goals scored by Helmut Rahn
No.	Date	Venue	Opponent	Score	Result	Competition	Ref.
1	23 December 1951	Georg-Melches-Stadion, Essen, Germany	Luxembourg	–	4–1	Friendly	
2	21 December 1952	Südweststadion, Ludwigshafen, Germany	Yugoslavia	–	3–2	Friendly	
3	22 November 1953	Volksparkstadion, Hamburg, Germany	Norway	5–1	5–1	1954 FIFA World Cup qualification	
4	20 June 1954	St. Jakob Stadium, Basel, Switzerland	Hungary	2–7	3–8	1954 FIFA World Cup	
5	27 June 1954	Charmilles Stadium, Geneva, Switzerland	Yugoslavia	2–0	2–0	1954 FIFA World Cup	
6	4 July 1954	Wankdorf Stadium, Bern, Switzerland	Hungary	2–2	3–2	1954 FIFA World Cup	
7	4 July 1954	Wankdorf Stadium, Bern, Switzerland	Hungary	3–2	3–2	1954 FIFA World Cup	
8	10 March 1957	Praterstadion, Vienna, Austria	Austria	–	3–2	Friendly	
9	10 March 1957	Praterstadion, Vienna, Austria	Austria	–	3–2	Friendly	
10	8 June 1958	Malmö Stadion, Malmö, Sweden	Argentina	1–1	3–1	1958 FIFA World Cup	
11	8 June 1958	Malmö Stadion, Malmö, Sweden	Argentina	3–1	3–1	1958 FIFA World Cup	
12	11 June 1958	Olympia, Helsingborg, Sweden	Czechoslovakia	2–2	2–2	1958 FIFA World Cup	
13	15 June 1958	Malmö Stadion, Malmö, Sweden	Northern Ireland	1–1	2–2	1958 FIFA World Cup	
14	19 June 1958	Malmö Stadion, Malmö, Sweden	Yugoslavia	1–0	1–0	1958 FIFA World Cup	
15	28 June 1958	Ullevi, Gothenburg, Sweden	France	2–4	3–6	1958 FIFA World Cup	
16	24 September 1958	Idrætsparken, Copenhagen, Denmark	Denmark	1–0	1–1	Friendly	
17	26 October 1958	Stade Yves-du-Manoir, Colombes, France	France	1–0	2–2	Friendly	
18	19 November 1958	Olympiastadion, Berlin, Germany	Austria	–	2–2	Friendly	
19	19 November 1958	Olympiastadion, Berlin, Germany	Austria	–	2–2	Friendly	
20	4 October 1959	Wankdorf Stadium, Bern, Switzerland	Switzerland	–	4–0	Friendly	
21	27 April 1960	Südweststadion, Ludwigshafen, Germany	Portugal	–	2–1	Friendly	

== Honours ==
=== Club ===
Rot-Weiss Essen

- DFB-Pokal: 1952–53
- German football championship: 1955

=== International ===
West Germany

- FIFA World Cup: 1954

=== Individual ===
- FIFA World Cup All-Star Team: 1954
- FIFA World Cup Silver Boot: 1958
- Ballon d'Or runner-up: 1958

== Books ==
- Helmut Rahn: Mein Hobby: Tore schießen. 1959, ISBN 3-421-05836-9

Sporting positions
Preceded by Hans Schäfer	West Germany captain 1958–1959	Succeeded by Herbert Erhardt
