= István Szimcsák =

Hungarian footballer

Personal information
- Date of birth: 22 July 1933
- Date of death: 27 July 2003 (aged 70)

International career
Years	Team	Apps	(Gls)
1955–1961	Hungary	6	(0)

István Szimcsák (22 July 1933 – 27 July 2003) was a Hungarian footballer. He played in six matches for the Hungary national football team from 1955 to 1961.
