= Heinz Wewers =

German footballer (1927–2008)

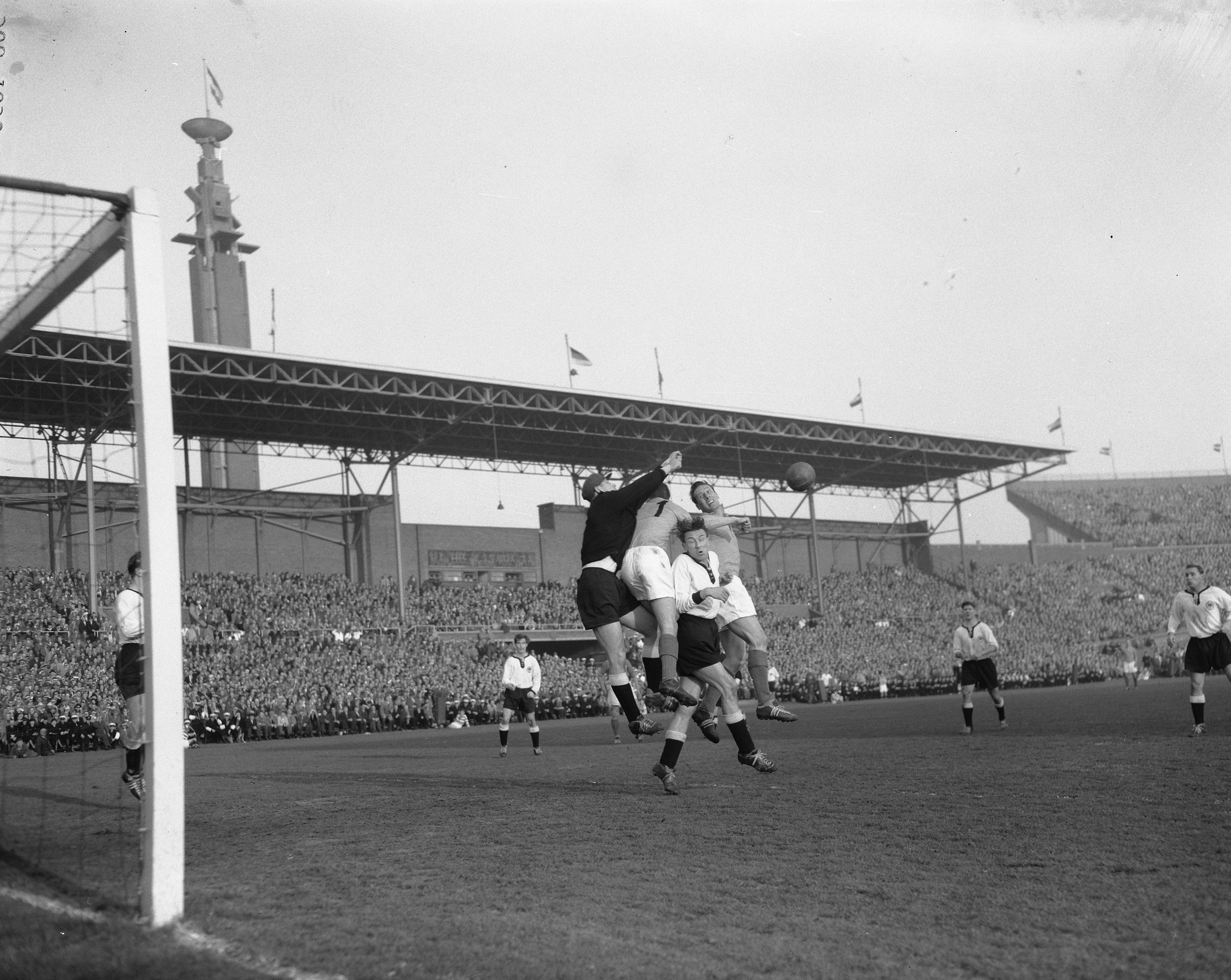

Personal information
- Date of birth: 27 July 1927
- Place of birth: Gladbeck, Germany
- Date of death: 29 August 2008 (aged 81)
- Position: Defender

Senior career*
Years	Team	Apps	(Gls)
1949–1962	Rot-Weiss Essen		

International career
1951–1958	West Germany	12	(1)

Managerial career
- 1966–1967: Rot-Weiss Essen
- * Club domestic league appearances and goals

Heinz Wewers (27 July 1927 – 29 August 2008) was a German footballer.

== Club career ==
He was the center half of the Rot-Weiß Essen team that won the German football championship in 1955 and the German Cup in 1953.

== International career ==
Between 1951 and 1958 Wewers earned 12 caps and scored 1 goal for the West Germany national team, and took part in the 1958 FIFA World Cup where the West Germans finished fourth.
