= 1952–53 DFB-Pokal =

Tournament details
- Country: West Germany
- Teams: 32

Final positions
- Champions: Rot-Weiss Essen
- Runners-up: Alemannia Aachen

Tournament statistics
- Matches played: 34

The 1952–53 DFB-Pokal was the 10th season of the annual German football cup competition. The DFB-Pokal was formerly known as Tschammer und Osten Pokal, or Tschammerpokal. It was the first time the cup was held after World War II. 32 teams competed in the tournament of five rounds. The competition began on 17 August 1952 and ended on 11 May 1953. In the final Rot-Weiss Essen defeated Alemannia Aachen 2–1.

The replay match between Hamborn and St. Pauli was the first football match in Germany covered live by television.

== Matches ==
=== First round ===
17 August 1952
VfB Stuttgart	0 – 3	Kickers Offenbach
Rot-Weiss Essen	5 – 0	SSV Jahn Regensburg
SV Waldhof Mannheim	2 – 1	Eintracht Braunschweig
Eintracht Osnabrück	1 – 2	Preußen Dellbrück
1. FC Saarbrücken	1 – 2	FC St. Pauli
Borussia Neunkirchen	2 – 1	FC Schalke 04
SpVgg Fürth	6 – 1	VfR Kaiserslautern
Wacker 04 Berlin	2 – 6	1. FC Nürnberg
Concordia Hamburg	4 – 3	Borussia Dortmund
Hamburger SV	6 – 1	Victoria Hamburg
Blau-Weiß 90 Berlin	0 – 1	Eintracht Trier
VfB Mühlburg	5 – 3	Preußen Münster	(AET)
Alemannia Aachen	5 – 2	SC Essen West
SSV Reutlingen	4 – 5	VfR Wormatia Worms	(AET)
Hamborn 07	4 – 1	SC Göttingen 05	(AET)
VfL Osnabrück	2 – 2	SV Phönix 03 Ludwigshafen	(AET)

==== Replay ====
5 October 1952
SV Phönix 03 Ludwigshafen	0 – 2	VfL Osnabrück

=== Round of 16 ===
11 November 1952
SV Waldhof Mannheim	5 – 2	SpVgg Fürth
Concordia Hamburg	4 – 3	VfB Mühlburg
Preußen Dellbrück	2 – 3	Kickers Offenbach	(AET)
VfR Wormatia Worms	4 – 1	Eintracht Trier
1. FC Nürnberg	3 – 3	Alemannia Aachen
Hamburger SV	2 – 0	Borussia Neunkirchen
Hamborn 07	1 – 1	FC St. Pauli	(AET)
Rot-Weiss Essen	2 – 0	VfL Osnabrück

==== Replays ====
Alemannia Aachen	2 – 0	1. FC Nürnberg
FC St. Pauli	3 – 4	Hamborn 07

=== Quarter-finals ===
1 February 1953
Rot-Weiss Essen	6 – 1	Hamburger SV
Kickers Offenbach	1 – 2	VfR Wormatia Worms
SV Waldhof Mannheim	2 – 1	Concordia Hamburg
Alemannia Aachen	3 – 1	Hamborn 07

=== Semi-finals ===
1 March 1953
Rot-Weiss Essen	3 – 2	SV Waldhof Mannheim
Alemannia Aachen	3 – 1	VfR Wormatia Worms

=== Final ===
1 May 1953
16:30 CET

Rot-Weiss Essen	2–1	Alemannia Aachen
Islacker 32'; Rahn 52'	Report	Derwall 56'

Rheinstadion, Düsseldorf
Attendance: 37,000
Referee: Alois Reinhardt (Stuttgart)
