= SV Sodingen =

German football club

- Full name: Sport-Verein 1912 Sodingen
- Founded: 1912
- Ground: SVS-Stadion, Herne
- League: Landesliga Westfalen 3 (VII)
- 2015–16: 5th
- Website: http://www.svsnet.de/

SV Sodingen is a German association football club based in Herne, North Rhine-Westphalia. The team currently plays in the Landesliga, the seventh tier of German football. Although a regional league side today, the club played in the first division Oberliga West through most of the 1950s and into the early 1960s. In 1955, they finished in second place behind Rot-Weiss Essen and qualified for the German football championship playoffs, finishing third in their group.

== Honours ==
- 2. Liga-West
  - Champions: 1952, 1960
