= Franz Islacker =

German footballer (1926–1970)

Personal information
- Date of birth: 3 February 1926
- Place of birth: Essen, Germany
- Date of death: 1 July 1970 (aged 44)
- Position: Forward

Senior career*
Years	Team	Apps	(Gls)
1945–1949	TuS Helene Altenessen		
1949–1950	VfR Mannheim		
1950–1952	Rheydter SV		
1952–1961	Rot-Weiss Essen		

International career
1954	West Germany	1	(0)
- * Club domestic league appearances and goals

Franz Islacker (3 February 1926 – 1 July 1970) was a German footballer who played as a forward. He is most notable for scoring a hat-trick for Rot-Weiss Essen in the final of the 1955 German football championship against Kaiserslautern. He was the father of Frank Islacker and the grandfather of Mandy Islacker.

== Honours ==
Rot-Weiss Essen

- DFB-Pokal: 1953
- German football championship: 1955
