= 1970 Coupe de France final =

- Event: 1969–70 Coupe de France
Saint-Étienne	Nantes
5	0
- Date: 31 May 1970
- Venue: Olympique Yves-du-Manoir, Colombes
- Referee: Robert Helies
- Attendance: 32,894

The 1970 Coupe de France final was a football match held at Stade Olympique Yves-du-Manoir, Colombes on 31 May 1970, that saw AS Saint-Étienne defeat FC Nantes 5–0 thanks to goals by Patrick Parizon, Georges Bereta, Robert Herbin and Hervé Revelli.

== Match details ==
31 May 1970

Saint-Étienne	5–0	Nantes
Parizon 26'; Bereta 40'; Herbin 51'; Revelli 74', 87'

Stade Olympique Yves-du-Manoir, Colombes
Attendance: 32,894
Referee: Robert Helies

GK	(France) Georges Carnus
DF	(Socialist Federal Republic of Yugoslavia) Vladimir Durković
DF	(France) Georges Polny
DF	(France) Robert Herbin	(c)
DF	(France) Bernard Bosquier
MF	(France) Aimé Jacquet
MF	(France) Patrick Parizon
MF	(France) Jean-Michel Larqué
FW	(France) Hervé Revelli
FW	(Mali) Salif Keita
FW	(France) Georges Bereta
Substitutes:
Manager:
(France) Albert Batteux Assistant Referees: Fourth Official:

GK
DF
DF
DF
DF
MF
MF
MF
MF
FW
FW
Substitutes:
MF
Manager:
(France) José Arribas

(France) Jean-Michel Fouché
(France) Jean-Claude Osman
(France) Gabriel De Michèle
(France) Roger Lemerre	(c)
(France) Vincent Estève
(France) Georges Eo	(substituted off) 56'
(France) Bernard Blanchet
(France) Michel Pech
(France) Henri Michel
(France) Philippe Gondet
(France) Philippe Levavasseur
(France) Claude Arribas	(substituted in) 56'

== See also ==
- 1969–70 Coupe de France
