= List of France international footballers =

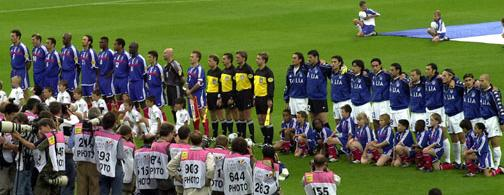
France (left) lineup ahead of the UEFA Euro 2000 Final against Italy

The France national football team (French: Equipe de France des Hommes) represents the nation of France in international association football. It is fielded by the French Football Federation (French: Fédération Française de Football), the governing body of football in France, and competes as a member of the Union of European Football Associations (UEFA), which encompasses the countries of Europe. The team played its first official international match on 1 May 1904 against Belgium. Since its first competitive match, more than 800 players have made at least one international appearance for the team. As hundreds of players have played for the team since it started officially registering its players in 1904, only players with 20 or more official caps are included.

Jean Ducret became the first French international to reach 20 caps, doing so on 29 March 1914 in a 2–0 defeat to Italy. He was also one of the first permanent captains of the national team. Ducret was later surpassed by defender Raymond Dubly and goalkeeper Pierre Chayriguès, who both played with the national team until 1925. Dubly finished his international career with 31 caps. Three years after retiring from the national team, Dubly's amount was exceeded by Jules Dewaquez, who went on to finish his career with 41 appearances. Dewaquez's record stood for nearly a decade before his amount was equaled by Edmond Delfour in 1938 and later surmounted by Étienne Mattler a year later. Similar to Dubly, Mattler's amount was exceeded, however after two decades, by former Stade de Reims defenders Roger Marche and Robert Jonquet. It was the former player who took over the record outperforming Jonquet by just five caps. Marche's 63 appearances remained the France national team record for appearance-making for 28 years, the longest time between the record being broken and set again. Marche was surpassed by Marius Trésor, who set the record after appearing in an October 1983 friendly match against Spain.

Trésor represented France only once afterward and his 65-cap output was subsequently passed by defender Maxime Bossis and midfielder Michel Platini. Bossis surpassed Trésor during qualifying for the 1986 FIFA World Cup, while Platini went beyond the former Marseille and Bordeaux player at the tournament itself, in which France finished in third place. Both players retired within months of each other as Bossis finished his career occupying the record, which was now at 76 caps, four more than Platini. After appearing at the 1986 FIFA World Cup, Bossis acquired the record of appearing in the most FIFA World Cup matches for France. He was surpassed by goalkeeper Fabien Barthez in 2006. Bossis was passed just six years later by former international teammate Manuel Amoros, who finished his international career with 82 appearances. The 1992–93 UEFA Champions League winner was eventually equaled or outperformed by 13 different players. Of the 13 players, 10 of them played on the team that won the 1998 FIFA World Cup and seven of them went on to become members of the FIFA Century Club, which consists of association football players who have accumulated 100 or more caps. Following the conclusion of UEFA Euro 2000, the record for France national team appearances was held by Didier Deschamps who also became the first French international to reach 100 caps. He was eventually surpassed by defender Marcel Desailly in 2003 who retired at the end of UEFA Euro 2004 with 116 caps. As a result, Desailly became the first player not born in France or the overseas departments and territories to occupy the record. He was overtaken by Lilian Thuram, who broke Desailly's record at the 2006 FIFA World Cup in the team's final group stage match against Togo. He would eventually finish with 142 caps. He is the second player born in an overseas department to hold the record, the first being Trésor. Both players were born in Guadeloupe. The current record holder for appearances with the national team is Hugo Lloris, who made 145 total competitive appearances for the team between 2008 and 2022. Lloris broke Thuram's record at the 2022 FIFA World Cup in the team's quarter final match against England.

== Players ==
Appearances and goals are composed of FIFA World Cup and UEFA European Championship matches and each competition's required qualification matches, as well as UEFA Nations League matches, FIFA Confederations Cup matches and numerous international friendly tournaments and matches. Players are listed by number of caps, then number of goals scored. If number of goals are equal, the players are then listed alphabetically.

Key
§	Still active for the national team
†	Played on team that won the 1998 FIFA World Cup
†	Played on team that won the 2018 FIFA World Cup
GK	Goalkeeper
DF	Defender
MF	Midfielder
FW	Forward

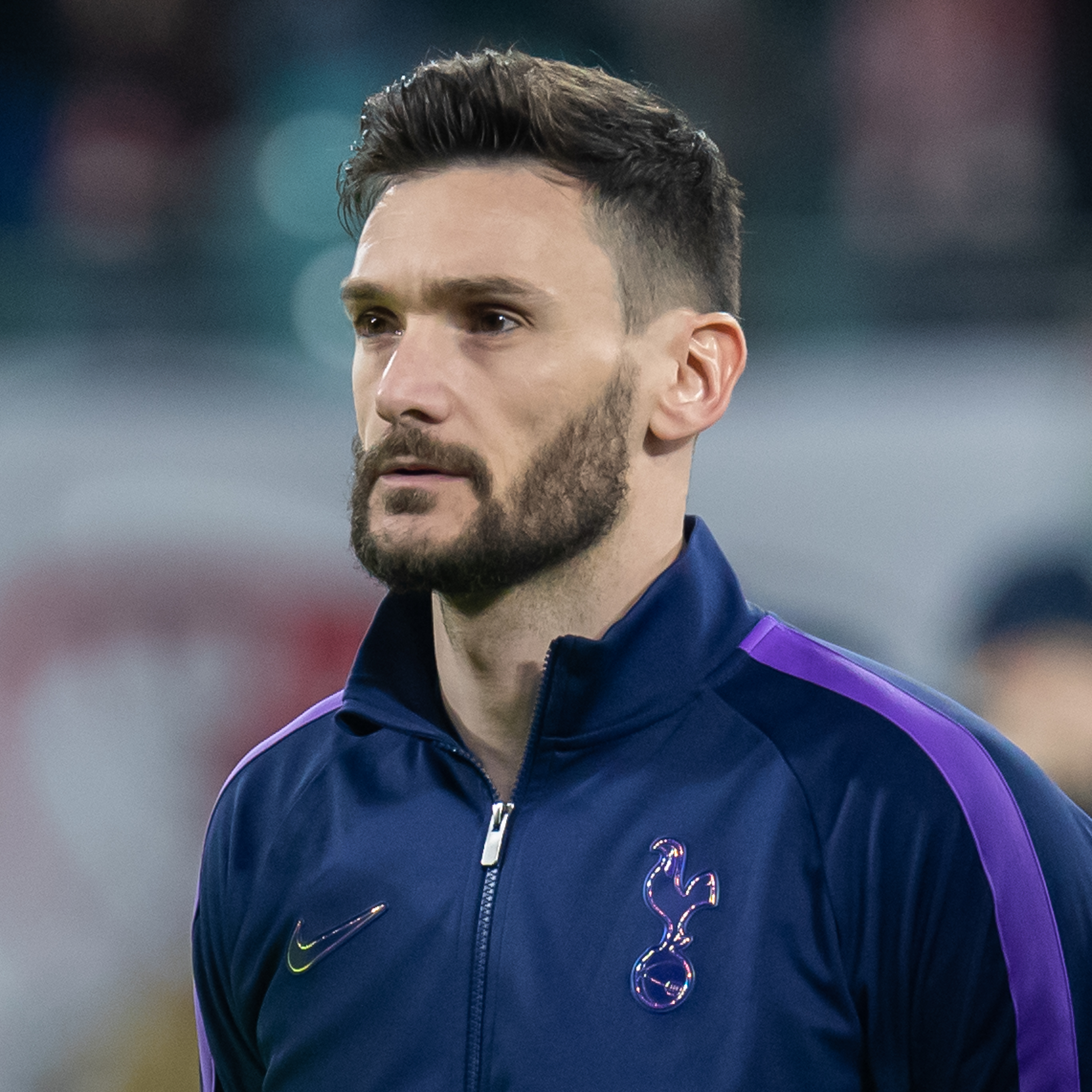
Hugo Lloris is the most-capped male France international having appeared in 145 matches and captained France to victory at the 2018 FIFA World Cup.

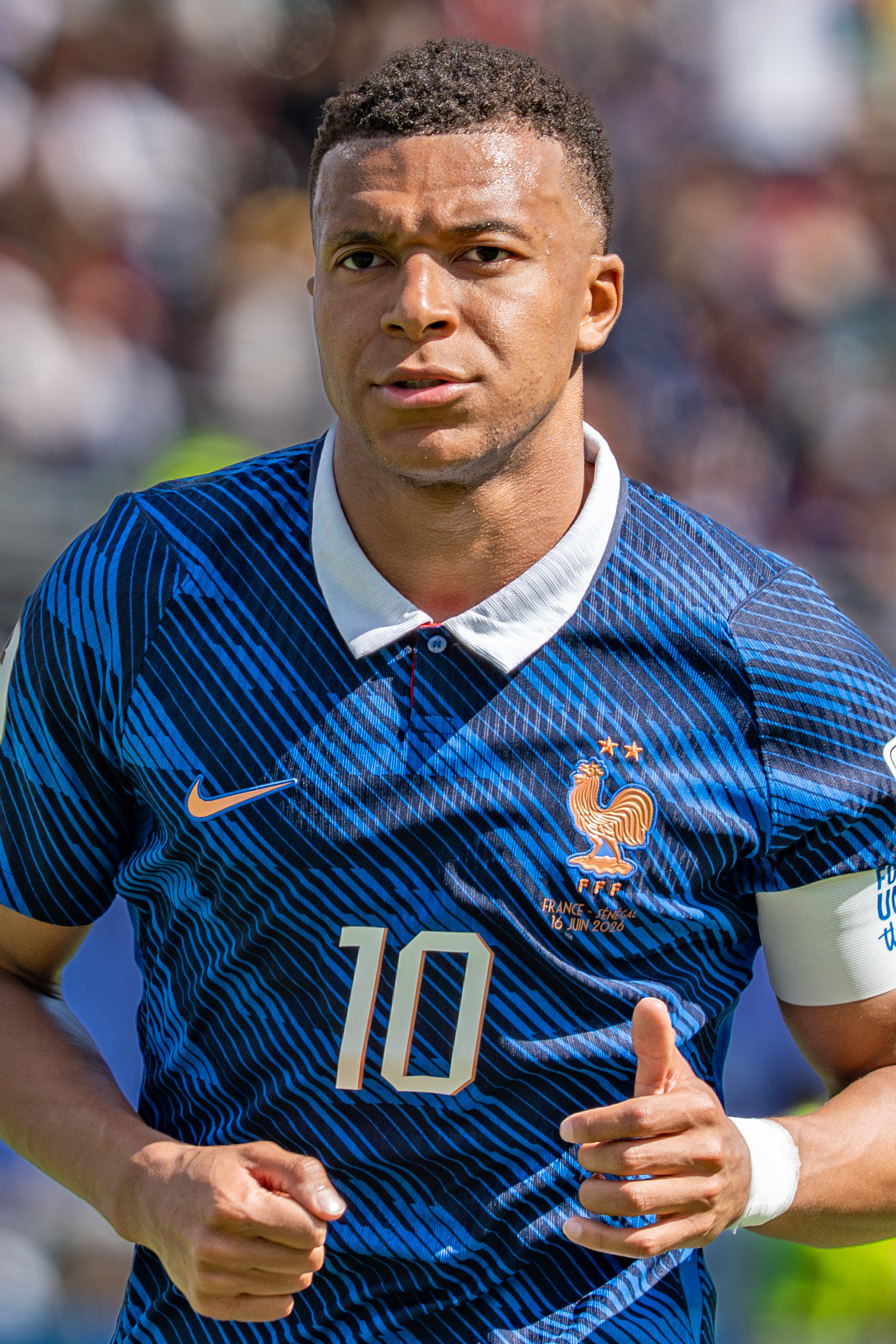
Kylian Mbappé (107 caps, 67 goals) is the national team's all-time leading goalscorer.

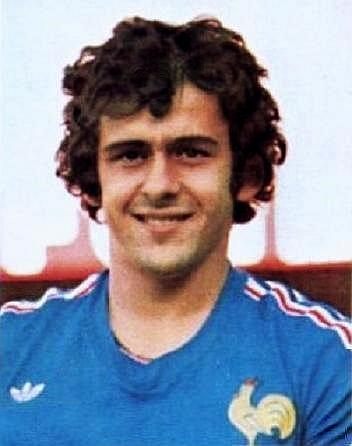
Michel Platini (72 caps, 41 goals) captained France to victory at UEFA Euro 1984.

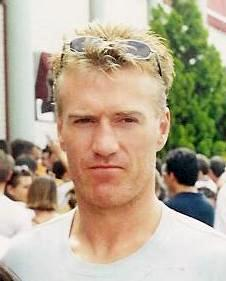
Didier Deschamps (103 caps, 4 goals) was the first player to reach 100 caps for France and captained France to victory at the 1998 FIFA World Cup and UEFA Euro 2000.

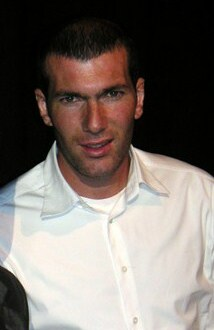
Playmaker Zinedine Zidane (108 caps, 31 goals) is the seventh most capped French footballer of all time and captained France to the 2006 FIFA World Cup Final.

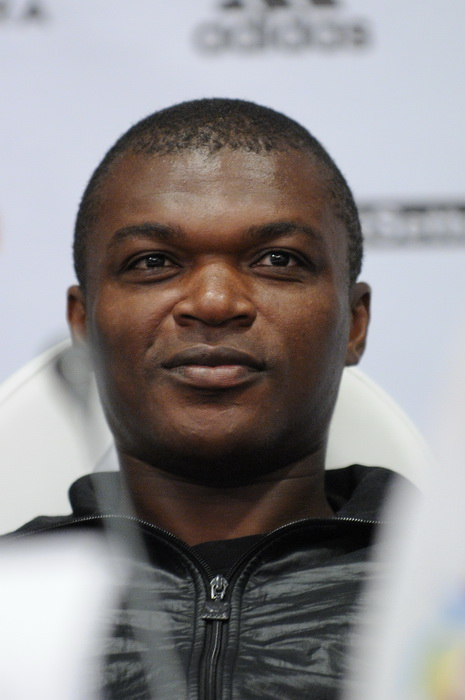
Marcel Desailly (116 caps, 3 goals) represented France at seven major international tournaments, including four as captain.

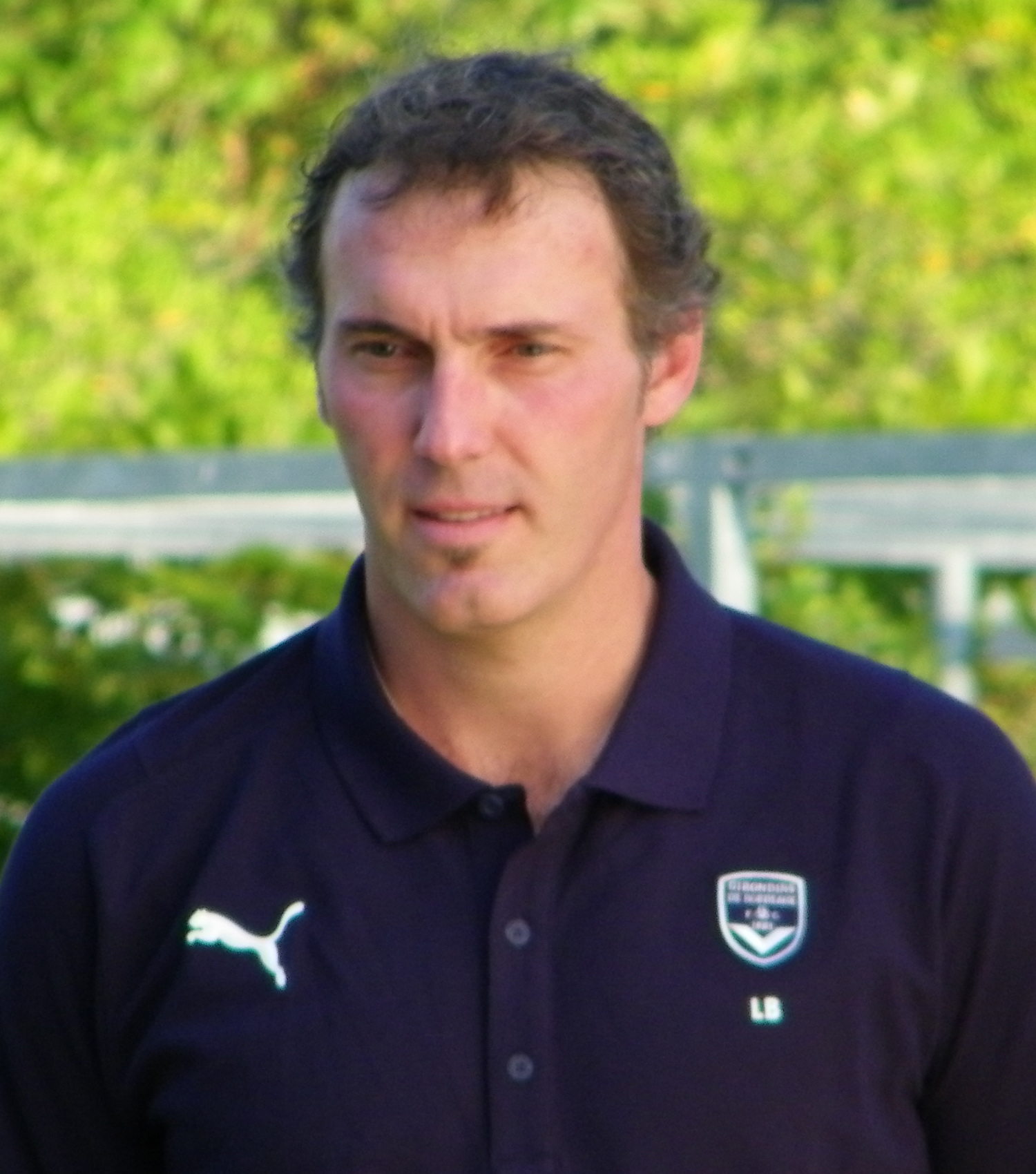
Defender Laurent Blanc (97 caps, 16 goals) was declared the fourth best French player of all time by magazine France Football.

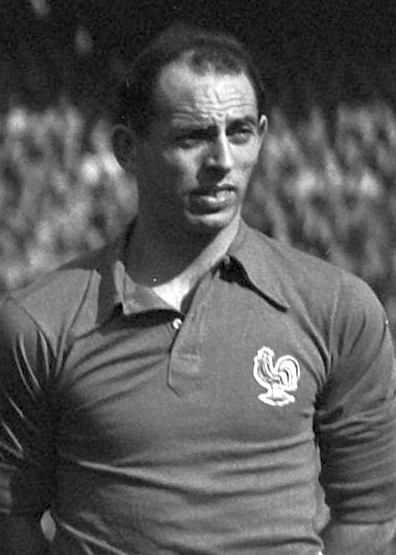
Roger Marche (63 caps, 1 goal) held the France national team record for appearance-making for 28 years, the longest time between the record being broken and set again.

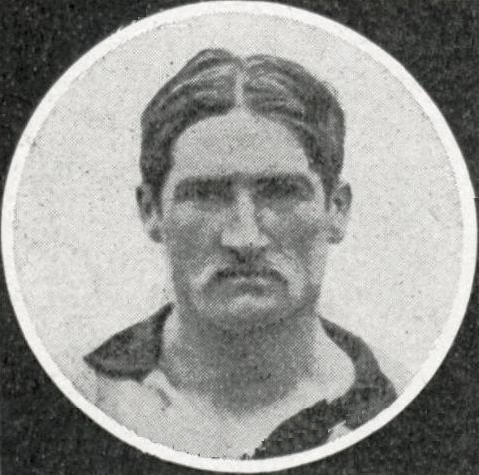
Jean Ducret (20 caps, 3 goals) was the first player to reach 20 caps for France.

France national team football players with at least 20 appearances
#	Name	Position	National team career	Caps	Goals	Ref
1	Hugo Lloris	GK	2008–2022^{†}	145	0	
2	Lilian Thuram	DF	1994–2008^{†}	142	2	
3	Olivier Giroud	FW	2011–2024^{†}	137	57	
=	Antoine Griezmann	FW	2014–2024^{†}	137	44	
5	Thierry Henry	FW	1997–2010^{†}	123	51	
6	Marcel Desailly	DF	1993–2004^{†}	116	3	
7	Zinedine Zidane	MF	1994–2006^{†}	108	31	
8	Kylian Mbappé^{§}	FW	2017–^{†}	107	67	
=	Patrick Vieira	MF	1997–2009^{†}	107	6	
10	Didier Deschamps	MF	1989–2000^{†}	103	4	
11	Karim Benzema	FW	2007–2022	97	37	
=	Laurent Blanc	DF	1989–2000^{†}	97	16	
=	Bixente Lizarazu	DF	1992–2004^{†}	97	2	
14	Raphaël Varane	DF	2013–2022†	93	5	
15	Sylvain Wiltord	FW	1999–2006	92	26	
16	Paul Pogba	MF	2013–2022^{†}	91	11	
17	Fabien Barthez	GK	1994–2006^{†}	87	0	
18	Blaise Matuidi	MF	2010–2019†	84	9	
=	William Gallas	DF	2002–2010	84	5	
20	Youri Djorkaeff	FW	1993–2002^{†}	82	28	
=	Manuel Amoros	DF	1982–1992	82	1	
22	Franck Ribéry	MF	2006–2014	81	16	
=	Patrice Evra	DF	2004–2016	81	0	
24	Florent Malouda	MF	2004–2012	80	9	
25	Robert Pires	FW	1996–2004^{†}	79	14	
26	Maxime Bossis	DF	1976–1986	76	1	
27	Michel Platini	MF	1976–1987	72	41	
28	David Trezeguet	FW	1998–2008^{†}	71	34	
=	Moussa Sissoko	MF	2009–2021	71	2	
=	Claude Makélélé	MF	1995–2008	71	0	
31	Nicolas Anelka	FW	1998–2010	69	14	
=	N'Golo Kanté^{§}	MF	2016–^{†}	69	2	
=	Ousmane Dembélé^{§}	FW	2016–^{†}	69	13	
34	Adrien Rabiot^{§}	MF	2016–	67	7	
=	Eric Abidal	DF	2004–2013	67	0	
36	Marius Trésor	DF	1971–1983	65	4	
=	Bacary Sagna	DF	2007–2016	65	0	
38	Lucas Digne^{§}	DF	2014–	64	0	
39	Emmanuel Petit	MF	1990–2003^{†}	63	6	
=	Roger Marche	DF	1947–1959	63	1	
41	Kingsley Coman^{§}	FW	2015–	61	8	
42	Luis Fernandez	MF	1982–1992	60	6	
43	Henri Michel	MF	1967–1980	58	4	
=	Robert Jonquet	DF	1948–1960	58	0	
=	Willy Sagnol	DF	2000–2008	58	0	
46	Jules Koundé^{§}	DF	2021–	57	0	
47	Patrick Battiston	DF	1977–1989	56	3	
48	Christophe Dugarry	FW	1994–2002^{†}	55	8	
=	Benjamin Pavard^{§}	DF	2017–^{†}	55	5	
50	Jean-Pierre Papin	FW	1986–1995	54	30	
51	Christian Karembeu	MF	1992–2002^{†}	53	1	
52	Didier Six	MF	1976–1984	52	13	
=	Mathieu Valbuena	MF	2010–2015	52	8	
=	Jean Tigana	MF	1980–1988	52	1	
55	Laurent Koscielny	DF	2011–2018	51	1	
56	Frank Leboeuf	DF	1995–2002^{†}	50	4	
=	Aurélien Tchouaméni^{§}	MF	2021–	50	3	
=	Joël Bats	GK	1983–1989	50	0	
=	Mike Maignan^{§}	GK	2020–	50	0	
60	Dominique Rocheteau	FW	1975–1986	49	15	
=	Sidney Govou	MF	2002–2010	49	10	
=	Théo Hernandez^{§}	DF	2021–	49	2	
63	Yohan Cabaye	MF	2010–2016	48	4	
=	Jean Djorkaeff	DF	1964–1972	48	3	
65	Alain Giresse	MF	1974–1986	47	6	
=	Dayot Upamecano^{§}	DF	2020–	47	2	
67	Jean Vincent	FW	1953–1961	46	22	
=	Étienne Mattler	DF	1930–1940	46	0	
69	Eric Cantona	FW	1987–1995	45	20	
=	Raymond Kopa	MF	1952–1962	45	18	
=	Basile Boli	DF	1986–1993	45	1	
72	Georges Bereta	FW	1967–1975	44	4	
=	Jean-Jacques Marcel	DF	1953–1961	44	3	
=	Alou Diarra	MF	2004–2012	44	0	
=	Bernard Lama	GK	1993–2000^{†}	44	0	
76	Bernard Bosquier	DF	1964–1972	42	3	
=	Lucas Hernandez^{§}	FW	2018–^{†}	42	0	
78	Jules Dewaquez	FW	1920–1929	41	12	
=	Djibril Cissé	FW	2002–2011	41	9	
=	Samir Nasri	MF	2007–2013	41	5	
=	Edmond Delfour	FW	1929–1938	41	2	
82	Vincent Candela	DF	1996–2002^{†}	40	2	
=	Mikaël Silvestre	DF	2001–2006	40	2	
=	Gérard Janvion	DF	1975–1982	40	0	
85	Franck Sauzée	MF	1988–1993	39	9	
=	Armand Penverne	DF	1952–1959	39	2	
=	Christian Lopez	DF	1975–1982	39	1	
88	Bernard Lacombe	FW	1973–1984	38	12	
=	Dimitri Payet	MF	2010–2018	38	8	
=	William Saliba	DF	2022–	38	0	
91	Roger Piantoni	FW	1952–1961	37	18	
=	Jean-Marc Ferreri	MF	1982–1990	37	3	
=	Jocelyn Angloma	DF	1990–1996	37	1	
94	Charly Loubet	FW	1967–1974	36	10	
=	André-Pierre Gignac	FW	2009–2016	36	7	
=	Adil Rami	DF	2010–2018^{†}	36	1	
=	Georges Carnus	GK	1963–1973	36	0	
=	Jérémy Toulalan	MF	2006–2010	36	0	
99	Paul Nicolas	FW	1920–1931	35	20	
=	Georges Lech	FW	1963–1973	35	7	
101	Marcus Thuram^{§}	FW	2020–	35	3	
=	Raymond Kaelbel	DF	1954–1960	35	1	
=	Steve Mandanda	GK	2008–2022^{†}	35	0	
104	Bruno Bellone	FW	1981–1988	34	2	
=	Grégory Coupet	GK	2001–2008	34	0	
=	Lassana Diarra	MF	2007–2016	34	0	
107	Maryan Wisniewski	FW	1955–1963	33	12	
=	Yannick Stopyra	FW	1980–1988	33	11	
109	Jean Baratte	FW	1944–1952	32	19	
=	Randal Kolo Muani^{§}	FW	2022–	32	9	
111	Alfred Aston	FW	1934–1946	31	5	
=	Raymond Dubly	FW	1913–1935	31	4	
=	Yoann Gourcuff	MF	2008–2013	31	4	
=	Samuel Umtiti	DF	2016–2019^{†}	31	4	
=	André Lerond	DF	1957–1963	31	0	
=	Bruno Martini	GK	1987–1996	31	0	
=	Alex Thépot	GK	1927–1935	31	0	
=	Eduardo Camavinga	MF	2020–	31	2	
119	Hervé Revelli	FW	1966–1975	30	15	
=	Marcel Langiller	FW	1927–1937	30	7	
=	Loïc Rémy	FW	2009–2014	30	7	
=	Anthony Martial	FW	2015–2021	30	2	
=	Bernard Casoni	DF	1988–1992	30	0	
=	Ibrahima Konaté	DF	2022–	30	0	
=	Bradley Barcola^{§}	FW	2024–	30	6	
126	Mamadou Sakho	DF	2010–2018	29	2	
=	Philippe Mexès	DF	2002–2012	29	1	
128	Corentin Tolisso	FW	2017–2021^{†}	28	2	
=	Yvon Le Roux	DF	1983–1989	28	1	
=	Presnel Kimpembe	DF	2018–2022^{†}	28	0	
131	Bernard Genghini	MF	1980–1986	27	6	
=	Thomas Lemar	FW	2016–2021^{†}	27	4	
=	Mathieu Debuchy	DF	2011–2018	27	2	
=	Jean-Alain Boumsong	DF	2003–2009	27	1	
=	Antoine Cuissard	MF	1946–1954	27	1	
=	Michael Olise	FW	2024–	27	8	
137	Patrice Loko	FW	1993–1997	26	7	
=	Alain Boghossian	MF	1997–2002^{†}	26	2	
=	Jean-Philippe Durand	MF	1988–1992	26	0	
=	François Remetter	GK	1953–1959	26	0	
=	Jean Wendling	DF	1959–1963	26	0	
142	Jean Nicolas	FW	1933–1938	25	21	
=	Oscar Heisserer	MF	1936–1948	25	8	
=	Reynald Pedros	MF	1993–1996	25	4	
=	Youssouf Fofana	MF	2022–	25	3	
=	Nabil Fekir	FW	2015–2020^{†}	25	2	
=	Alain Roche	DF	1988–1996	25	1	
=	Joseph Bonnel	MF	1962–1969	25	1	
=	Julien Darui	GK	1939–1951	25	0	
=	Jean-Paul Rostagni	DF	1969–1973	25	0	
=	Alexandre Villaplane	MF	1926–1930	25	0	
152	Émile Veinante	FW	1929–1940	24	14	
=	Jérémy Ménez	MF	2010–2013	24	2	
=	François Hugues	MF	1919–1927	24	1	
=	André Chorda	DF	1960–1966	24	0	
=	René Ferrier	MF	1958–1964	24	0	
157	Steve Marlet	MF	2000–2004	23	6	
=	André Strappe	MF	1949–1954	23	4	
=	Robert Herbin	MF	1960–1968	23	3	
=	Philippe Bonnardel	MF	1920–1927	23	0	
=	Éric Di Meco	DF	1989–1996	23	0	
162	Roger Courtois	FW	1933–1947	22	10	
=	Christian Perez	FW	1988–1992	22	2	
=	Yann M'Vila	MF	2010–2012	22	1	
=	Pascal Vahirua	FW	1990–1994	22	1	
=	Jean-Pierre Adams	DF	1972–1976	22	0	
=	Benoît Pedretti	MF	2002–2005	22	0	
=	Thierry Tusseau	MF	1977–1986	22	0	
=	Jules Vandooren	DF	1933–1942	22	0	
170	Just Fontaine	FW	1953–1960	21	30	
=	Joseph Ujlaki	FW	1952–1960	21	10	
=	Marcel Artelesa	DF	1963–1966	21	1	
=	Olivier Dacourt	MF	2001–2004	21	1	
=	Dominique Baratelli	GK	1969–1982	21	0	
=	Pierre Bernard	GK	1960–1965	21	0	
=	Pierre Chayriguès	GK	1911–1925	21	0	
=	Bruno Rodzik	DF	1960–1963	21	0	
=	Sébastien Squillaci	DF	2004–2010	21	0	
=	Urbain Wallet	DF	1925–1929	21	0	
=	Manu Koné	MF	2024–	21	0	
181	Dominique Bathenay	MF	1975–1982	20	4	
=	Yvon Douis	FW	1957–1965	20	4	
=	Louis Saha	FW	2004–2012	20	4	
=	Jean Ducret	MF	1910–1914	20	3	
=	Anthony Réveillère	DF	2003–2012	20	1	
=	Marcel Aubour	DF	1964–1968	20	0	
=	William Ayache	DF	1983–1988	20	0	
=	Gaël Clichy	DF	2008–2013	20	0	
=	Marcel Domergue	DF	1922–1928	20	0	
=	Jacky Novi	DF	1969–1972	20	0	
=	Steven Nzonzi	MF	2017–2020^{†}	20	0	

== See also ==
- List of leading goalscorers for the France national football team
- List of France national football team captains
- List of France women's international footballers
