= 1968 Coupe de France final =

- Event: 1967–68 Coupe de France
Saint-Étienne	Bordeaux
2	1
- Date: 12 May 1968
- Venue: Olympique Yves-du-Manoir, Colombes
- Referee: Roger Barde
- Attendance: 33,959

The 1968 Coupe de France final was a football match held at Stade Olympique Yves-du-Manoir, Colombes on May 12, 1968, that saw AS Saint-Étienne defeat FC Girondins de Bordeaux 2–1 thanks to goals by Rachid Mekloufi.

== Match details ==
12 May 1968

Saint-Étienne	2–1	Bordeaux
Mekhloufi 30', 78'		Wojciak 5'

Stade Olympique Yves-du-Manoir, Colombes
Attendance: 33,959
Referee: Roger Barde

GK	(France) Georges Carnus
DF	(Socialist Federal Republic of Yugoslavia) Vladimir Durković
DF	(France) Georges Polny
DF	(France) Roland Mitoraj
DF	(France) Bernard Bosquier
MF	(France) Aimé Jacquet
MF	(France) André Fefeu
MF	(France) Robert Herbin	(c)
FW	(France) Hervé Revelli
FW	(Algeria) Rachid Mekhloufi
FW	(France) Georges Bereta
Substitutes:
Manager:
(France) Albert Batteux Assistant Referees: Fourth Official:

GK
DF
DF
DF
DF
MF
MF
MF
FW
FW
FW
Substitutes:
FW
Manager:
(France) Jean-Pierre Bakrim

(France) Christian Montes
(France) Bernard Baudet
(France) André Chorda
(France) Robert Péri
(France) Didier Desremeaux
(France) Guy Calleja	(c)
(France) Didier Couécou
(France) Hector De Bourgoing
(Brazil) Ruiter De Oliveira	(substituted off) 75'
(Cameroon) Gabriel Abossolo
(France) Edouard Wojciak
(France) Henri Duhayot	(substituted in) 75'

== See also ==
- 1967–68 Coupe de France
