= French Player of the Year =

Annual football award by France Football magazine

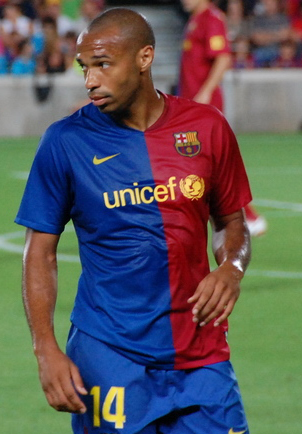
Thierry Henry, pictured in 2008, was named French Player of the Year five times, more than any other player.

The French Player of the Year is an association football award presented annually by the French magazine France Football since 1959. Originally, only French players playing in France were eligible, but starting in 1996 French players playing abroad were in contention to win the trophy. Since 2001, former winners have elected the Player of the Year.

== Format ==
In 2023, France Football changed the format of its award by changing its time frame from the calendar year to the football season. They also decided to introduce a French Player of the Year award for women's footballers.

== Male winners ==
Year	Player	Club(s)
1959	Jules Sbroglia	(France) Angers
1960	Raymond Kopa	(France) Reims
1961	Mahi Khennane	(France) Rennes
1962	André Lerond	(France) Stade Français
1963	Yvon Douis	(France) Monaco
1964	Marcel Artelesa	(France) Monaco
1965	Philippe Gondet	(France) Nantes
1966	Philippe Gondet (2)	(France) Nantes
1967	Bernard Bosquier	(France) Saint-Étienne
1968	Bernard Bosquier (2)	(France) Saint-Étienne
1969	Hervé Revelli	(France) Saint-Étienne
1970	Georges Carnus	(France) Saint-Étienne
1971	Georges Carnus (2)	(France) Saint-Étienne (France) Marseille
1972	Marius Trésor	(France) Ajaccio (France) Marseille
1973	Georges Bereta	(France) Saint-Étienne
1974	Georges Bereta (2)	(France) Saint-Étienne
1975	Jean-Marc Guillou	(France) Angers (France) Nice
1976	Michel Platini	(France) Nancy
1977	Michel Platini (2)	(France) Nancy
1978	Jean Petit	(France) Monaco
1979	Maxime Bossis	(France) Nantes
1980	Jean-François Larios	(France) Saint-Étienne
1981	Maxime Bossis (2)	(France) Nantes
1982	Alain Giresse	(France) Bordeaux
1983	Alain Giresse	(France) Bordeaux
1984	Jean Tigana	(France) Bordeaux
1985	Luis Fernández	(France) Paris Saint-Germain
1986	Manuel Amoros	(France) Monaco
1987	Alain Giresse (3)	(France) Marseille
1988	Stéphane Paille	(France) Sochaux
1989	Jean-Pierre Papin	(France) Marseille
1990	Laurent Blanc	(France) Montpellier
1991	Jean-Pierre Papin (2)	(France) Marseille
1992	Alain Roche	(France) Auxerre (France) Paris Saint-Germain
1993	David Ginola	(France) Paris Saint-Germain
1994	Bernard Lama	(France) Paris Saint-Germain
1995	Vincent Guérin	(France) Paris Saint-Germain
1996	Didier Deschamps	(Italy) Juventus
1997	Lilian Thuram	(Italy) Parma
1998	Zinedine Zidane	(Italy) Juventus
1999	Sylvain Wiltord	(France) Bordeaux
2000	Thierry Henry	(England) Arsenal
2001	Patrick Vieira	(England) Arsenal
2002	Zinedine Zidane (2)	(Spain) Real Madrid
2003	Thierry Henry	(England) Arsenal
2004	Thierry Henry	(England) Arsenal
2005	Thierry Henry	(England) Arsenal
2006	Thierry Henry (5)	(England) Arsenal
2007	Franck Ribéry	(France) Marseille
2008	Franck Ribéry	(Germany) Bayern Munich
2009	Yoann Gourcuff	(France) Bordeaux
2010	Samir Nasri	(England) Arsenal
2011	Karim Benzema	(Spain) Real Madrid
2012	Karim Benzema	(Spain) Real Madrid
2013	Franck Ribéry (3)	(Germany) Bayern Munich
2014	Karim Benzema	(Spain) Real Madrid
2015	Blaise Matuidi	(France) Paris Saint-Germain
2016	Antoine Griezmann	(Spain) Atlético Madrid
2017	N'Golo Kanté	(England) Chelsea
2018	Kylian Mbappé	(France) Paris Saint-Germain
2019	Kylian Mbappé	(France) Paris Saint-Germain
2020	Not awarded due to the COVID-19 pandemic	
2021	Karim Benzema (4)	(Spain) Real Madrid
Seasonal format replaced annual calendar format
2022–23	Kylian Mbappé	(France) Paris Saint-Germain
2023–24	Kylian Mbappé (4)	(France) Paris Saint-Germain
2024–25	Ousmane Dembélé	(France) Paris Saint-Germain

== Player of the Century ==
At the end of the 20th century, the magazine also voted on the French Player of the Century, won by Michel Platini.

Rank	Player	Votes
1	Michel Platini	143
2	Zinedine Zidane	121
3	Raymond Kopa	88
4	Laurent Blanc	28
5	Just Fontaine	22
6	Marius Trésor	17
7	Alain Giresse	15
8	Jean-Pierre Papin	12
9	Didier Deschamps	9
10	Eric Cantona	8

== Manager of the Year ==
Every year, the magazine elects the best French manager of the year. The jury is composed of former laureates.

- 1970: Albert Batteux
- 1970: Mario Zatelli
- 1971: Kader Firoud
- 1971: Jean Prouff
- 1972: Jean Snella
- 1973: Robert Herbin
- 1974: Pierre Cahuzac
- 1975: Georges Huart
- 1976: Robert Herbin
- 1977: Pierre Cahuzac
- 1978: Gilbert Gress
- 1979: Michel Le Millinaire
- 1980: René Hauss
- 1981: Aimé Jacquet
- 1982: Michel Hidalgo
- 1983: Michel Le Milinaire
- 1984: Aimé Jacquet
- 1985: Jean-Claude Suaudeau
- 1986: Guy Roux
- 1987: Jean Fernández
- 1988: Guy Roux
- 1989: Gérard Gili
- 1990: Henryk Kasperczak
- 1991: Daniel Jeandupeux
- 1992: Jean-Claude Suaudeau
- 1993: Jean Fernández
- 1994: Jean-Claude Suaudeau
- 1995: Francis Smerecki
- 1996: Guy Roux
- 1997: Jean Tigana
- 1998: Aimé Jacquet
- 1999: Élie Baup
- 2000: Alex Dupont
- 2001: Vahid Halilhodžić
- 2002: Jacques Santini
- 2003: Didier Deschamps
- 2004: Paul Le Guen
- 2005: Claude Puel
- 2006: Pablo Correa
- 2007: Pablo Correa
- 2008: Arsène Wenger
- 2009: Laurent Blanc
- 2010: Didier Deschamps
- 2011: Rudi Garcia
- 2012: René Girard
- 2013: Rudi Garcia
- 2014: Rudi Garcia
- 2015: Laurent Blanc
- 2016: Zinedine Zidane
- 2017: Zinedine Zidane
- 2018: Didier Deschamps
- 2019: Christophe Galtier
- 2020: Not awarded due to the COVID-19 pandemic
- 2021: Christophe Galtier
- 2022–23: Franck Haise
- 2023–24: Éric Roy
- 2024–25: Bruno Génésio

== See also ==
- Onze d'Or (1976–present)
