= Robert Herbin =

French footballer and manager (1939–2020)

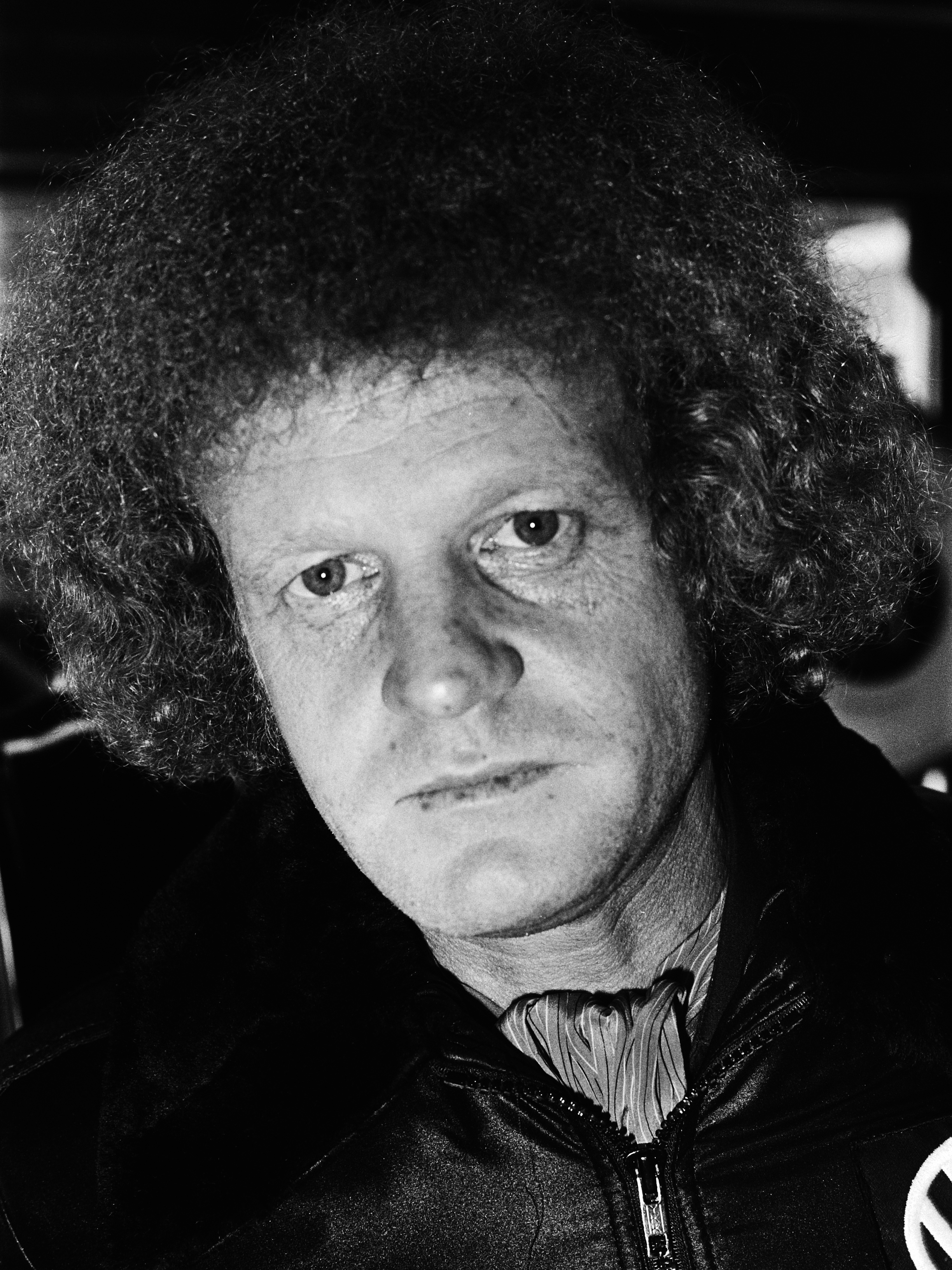
- Herbin in 1979

Personal information
- Date of birth: 30 March 1939
- Place of birth: Paris, France
- Date of death: 27 April 2020 (aged 81)
- Place of death: Saint-Étienne, France
- Positions: Defender; midfielder

Youth career
- 1950-1957: Cavigal Nice

Senior career*
Years	Team	Apps	(Gls)
1957–1972	Saint-Étienne	412	(88)
1975	Saint-Étienne	1	(1)
Total		413	(89)

International career
1957	France U18		
1960–1968	France	23	(3)

Managerial career
- 1972–1983: Saint-Étienne
- 1983–1985: Lyon
- 1985–1986: Al-Nassr
- 1986–1987: Strasbourg
- 1987–1990: Saint-Étienne
- 1991–1995: Red Star
- * Club domestic league appearances and goals

Robert Herbin (30 March 1939 – 27 April 2020) was a French footballer and manager, who represented the France national team 23 times. Known as "the Sphinx" due to his reserved personality, Herbin was a one-club man as a player for AS Saint-Étienne, and also later managed les Verts for eleven years.

He won five Ligue 1 titles as a player and four as a manager, and his Saint-Étienne team lost the 1976 European Cup Final to FC Bayern Munich at Hampden Park. For both his playing and managerial career, he is considered one of the most important figures in the history of French football.

== Early life ==
Herbin was born on 30 March 1939 in Paris. He had an older brother and two sisters, and his father, whose name was also Robert, was a professional musician who played the trombone. The classical music that surrounded Herbin as a child would become a lifelong passion.

In 1947, when Herbin was aged 8, his father accepted a role in the newly founded Opéra de Nice, and the family thus moved to Nice. He first began playing football there in a local parish team, before at the age of 11 following in the footsteps of his older brother, whose footballing talents had been noticed first, by committing to play for Cavigal Nice.

== Club career ==
=== Youth career ===
Working his way through the youth ranks at Cavigal Nice, by 1956-57 Herbin had become the captain of the club's youth side, who finished second in the Southeast youth league behind OGC Nice, and would also be selected for the France under-18 side.

In the summer of 1957, Herbin had a trial with OGC Nice, one of the best teams in France at the time, but would instead have his head turned by reigning French champions Saint-Étienne.

=== Saint-Étienne ===
Herbin moved from Cavigal Nice to Saint-Étienne at age 18, for 2.5 million French francs (around €3,800 in 2020). He made his debut on 29 September 1957 against OGC Nice, and quickly established himself as a starting player in the Division 1 side, playing as a central defender. During the 1962–63 season, which his side spent in Division 2 having been relegated the season prior, Herbin finished as Saint-Étienne's top scorer, netting 16 times for les Verts as they bounced back to the top flight. The following season, with the emergence of the 4-2-4 which required greater mobility from both central midfielders, coach Jean Snella decided to move Herbin into midfield, where his stamina and ability to win back possession could greatly help his side. He continued playing in this position for the rest of the 1960s, forming formidable midfield duos alongside René Ferrier and later Rachid Mekhloufi.

Herbin's force of character made him one of the pillars, as captain, of the Saint-Étienne side that would win four consecutive French championships between 1967 and 1970. He only ever suffered one serious injury in his career, a knee injury obtained at the 1966 World Cup, which left some lasting effects, including limiting his game time.

During the 1969–70 season, Saint-Étienne manager Albert Batteux moved Herbin back into the centre of defence due to concerns regarding his central defenders' aerial play. The move was a success, with Herbin forming a strong partnership alongside Bernard Bosquier, and Gilbert Gress, Herbin's teammate with France, would later say of the move: "In the 1960s, Roby [a nickname for Herbin] was a midfielder who had been converted into a centre-back. He was concerned with passing the ball out neatly. It was at a time when, in France, if you made a sideways pass, you'd get booed from the terraces. You had to move the ball forward! [...] Roby had very good technique and was very good in the air, which made him a libero like Beckenbauer."

On the 31 March 1971, Herbin was selected as part of a team made up of players from Saint-Étienne and Marseille, the two strongest French sides at the time, to face Brazilian side Santos, featuring their star player Pelé, in a friendly match in front of 30,000 spectators at the Stade Yves-du-Manoir in Colombes. The combined French side came out 3–1 victors, in what would be the high point of Herbin's playing career.

In the spring of 1972, Batteux, whose relationship with Saint-Étienne owner Roger Rocher had become strained due to the sale of two important players to rivals Marseille the previous season, and he announced his intention to step down at the end of the season. He suggested Herbin as his successor, in keeping with the tradition of continuity and co-optation present at the club at the time. Although he was likely still capable of playing on for several more seasons at the highest level, Herbin, who had obtained his coaching qualifications two years prior, decided to accept the managerial position, retiring during the 1972 offseason at the age of 33. He would, however, lace up his boots one last time on the final matchday of the 1974–75 season, when, with his team having already mathematically secured their position as champions of France, he selected himself to play at centre-back in a home fixture against Troyes on June 3, 1975. His side won 5–1, with Herbin himself, at the request of his players, taking and scoring the penalty that would be Saint-Étienne's fifth goal in the match. This appearances earns him the rare distinction of being one of the only player-managers to have been crowned French champion.

In total, Herbin made 509 appearances at club level, all as a starter in the green of Saint-Étienne.

== International career ==
While still at Cavigal Nice, Herbin featured in the France under-18 side that finished joint third in the 1957 UEFA European Under-18 Championship.

Following the end of his third season in professional football, Herbin made his debut for the France national team on 6 July 1960 against Yugoslavia in the semi-final of the first European Championship. At the Parc des Princes, he started in central defence alongside Jean-Jacques Marcel, with his side ultimately losing 4–5, and ultimately finishing fourth in the competition.

Herbin's first win with the national team came during his third cap on 27 February 1963, a 5–2 victory over England in 1964 Euros qualification. Having failed to qualify for the previous year's World Cup, the French team began a long dry spell that would limit both the international careers and reputations of that entire generation of French footballers, including Herbin. During this period, he scored his first goal for Les Bleus in his sixth appearance for the national team, a long-distance strike in a 3–1 win over Bulgaria, again in 1964 Euros qualification.

Herbin took part in the 1966 World Cup in England, in which France disappointed, going out in the group stage with two losses against Uruguay and eventual winners England, and a draw against Mexico. During France's match against England, he suffered a serious knee injury from a strong tackle by midfielder Nobby Stiles, which would affect the rest of his career.

His final international appearance came on the 17 October 1968 in a friendly match against Spain at the Stade de Gerland, which France lost 1–3. Herbin made 23 appearances in total for the France national team, scoring three times.

== Style of play ==
As a player, Herbin was known for his jumping and heading ability, and for possessing a powerful shot from distance. He also earned plaudits for his consistency, versatility, and tactical awareness.

== Managerial career ==
=== Saint-Étienne ===
==== Managerial style and changes ====
At the suggestion of Albert Batteux, Herbin was instated as the new manager of Saint-Étienne when the former stepped down in the summer of 1972, retiring from his playing career at the age of 33 in order to accept the role. Despite his relative youth, Herbin quickly established himself as a successful and legitimate manager through his authoritativeness and depth of understanding of the game. He was known for his level-headedness, which some found enigmatic, and his reserved and aloof personality earned him the nickname "the Sphinx". However, despite this image, he was also known for being close with his players, even defending them to club management when necessary. During games, he spoke little and rarely got up from the bench. He also did not speak much to the media, who at that time were still allowed to enter the dressing rooms, but what brief comments he did make were usually appreciated and seen as interesting.

"Despite his prestige and sporting success, Roby [a nickname for Herbin] has never strayed from the path of simplicity and modesty. [...] This is one of the most appealing and endearing aspects of his personality. Roby has always been a good listener and observer. [...] Robert Herbin's humanism is neither fake nor superficial, and if he is careful not to show his feelings, it is because he is shy - yes, really! - and modest. People say he is cold, when in fact he is sensitive to everything, it is just that his joys are internal. A calm and thoughtful man, his words are always measured, whether in victory or in defeat. Let us therefore salute Robert Herbin, the sportsman who has created his own way to navigate the ups and downs of an exciting but tricky profession."

— Michel Hidalgo, preface to On m'appelle le Sphinx [They Call Me the Sphinx] (1983)

A keen observer of both the success of the Italy national team (winners of the 1968 Euros and finalists of the 1970 World Cup) and of the Total Football being pioneered at Ajax, Herbin intended to base his side's game on tactical discipline and physical power. He immediately revolutionised the approach to training, focusing more on physical conditioning, and demanding high standards from his players.

On the pitch, Herbin preferred a 4-3-3 formation with a sweeper and out-and-out wingers, which meant his full-backs did not need to go forward and have the attacking influence that is common in the modern game. He was also the first coach in France to demand that the entire team be involved in winning the ball back once it had been lost. Unlike his predecessor Batteux, who built his side's attacking game around a true playmaker, Herbin favoured a system in which one of the two wide midfielders (typically Bereta, Larqué, or Synaeghel) launched the attack, depending upon the situation.

One of his first disputes as manager was managing the players of his own generation, who had won four consecutive titles from 1967 to 1970, but were now reaching the end of their careers. To do so, he had to have been able to rely on a strong youth development center, who produced a string of young players (Gérard Janvion, Christian Lopez, Dominique Bathenay, Jacques Santini, Christian Synaeghel, and Dominique Rocheteau) who worked their ways into the first team over the following years. This young core was reinforced by two world-class foreign players (the maximum allowed by Division 1 rules at the time) who Herbin, aware of a lack of talent in France in their respective positions, recruited in 1972: Yugoslavian goalkeeper Ivan Ćurković and Argentinian centre-back Osvaldo Piazza.

==== Grand Saint-Étienne ====
Herbin's Saint-Étienne did not get off to a flying start, finishing fourth in 1972-73 without ever having posed a real challenge to eventual champions Nantes, but Herbin himself was nevertheless voted French Manager of the Year by France Football. The following season, however, everything fell into place, and Saint-Étienne won the league comfortably, with an eventual eight-point lead over competitors Nantes (especially impressive as the league still operated on two points per win, instead of three as it is today, as well as the Coupe de France. This marked the beginning of Saint-Étienne's second great generation.

Les Verts won a second consecutive title in 1974-75, then a third in 1975-76. The backbone of this is one of the greatest home records in French top flight history (still true as of September 2025): a 28-game home winning streak which stretched 530 days from 13 March 1974 to 27 August 1975, as Herbin's side turned the Stade Geoffroy-Guichard into a fortress. The streak only ended on the 12 September 1975 in a 1–1 draw against PSG, in which the visitors equalised with just three minutes left to play.

It was that Saint-Étienne side's exploits in Europe, however, that most enhanced their reputation and legacy, and Herbin's along with it. Their 1974-75 European Cup run to the semi-final, in which they beat Hajduk Split and Ruch Chorzów, and only lost to eventual winners Bayern Munich, gave hope to a French football in crisis, and would set the stage for what would come the following year.

In the 1975-76 European Cup, Herbin's ideas fully came to fruition. The young generation of 1972–74, bolstered by the breakthrough of Dominique Rocheteau in the summer of 1975, became a powerful force, defeating Rangers comfortably in the round of 16, including winning the leg at Ibrox, where French sides generally struggled, before defeating Dynamo Kyiv in the quarter-final, and then earning their spot in the final by defeating PSV Eindhoven in a tough physical battle in the semi-final. His side, however, ultimately fell short in the final at Hamden Park in Glasgow, going down 1–0 to previous foes Bayern Munich, who, in victory, marked their third consecutive European Cup. Despite the defeat, the Saint-Étienne team were still honoured with a parade down the Champs-Élysées and a reception by President Valéry Giscard d'Estaing, and Herbin himself was elected French Manager of the Year for the second time of his career.

==== After Glasgow ====
The defeat in Glasgow, however, appeared to have broken something within the club. In 1976-77, Saint-Étienne quickly fell behind in the league, finishing fifth, and only qualified for Europe through a hard-fought 2–1 victory over Reims in the Coupe de France final. In the European Cup, meanwhile, they lost 2–3 in the quarter final to eventual winners Liverpool, which marked the end of their era of European success, and was only furthered emphasised by a comfortable 1–3 loss to Manchester United in the first round of the following season's European Cup Winners Cup. Dissent was rife within the dressing room as Herbin's message was no longer getting through, and club captain and leader Jean-Michel Larqué was unceremoniously removed from the first team in the summer of 1977 and transferred to PSG.

Despite these adversities, club president Roger Rocher kept faith in Herbin as a manager, and instead decided to change the club's sporting policy, taking more personal control of the club's transfers, albeit frustrating Herbin in the process. What followed was a serious of high-quality arrivals in 1978 and 1979, including Jacques Zimako, Jean-François Larios, Bernard Lacombe, Johnny Rep, and, most notably, Michel Platini, who helped rejuvenate the squad. Herbin adapted the team's attacking play to focus on Platini, and the results followed. Having finished seventh in 1977-78, Saint-Étienne climbed to third in 1978-79, maintaining this performance in 1979-80, before winning their tenth (and most recent) French title in 1980-81. This success did not follow into Europe as it had in their glory days, however. Herbin's side reached the quarter-finals of the European Cup in 1979-80 and 1980-81, but lost comfortably on both occasions to more physical, better organised opposition in the forms of Borussia Mönchengladbach and Ipswich Town respectively.

The beginning of Saint-Étienne's upcoming decline was beginning to become evident at all levels by this point, but neither Rocher nor Herbin seemed willing to accept it. A second-place finish in 1981-82, having battled it out against eventual champions AS Monaco all season, initially papered over cracks, but 1982-83 turned out to be a disaster. Herbin was already beginning to lose control of a dressing room who had recently lost Platini to Juventus when a slush fund scandal hit the club, beginning a period of decline that Saint-Étienne have never fully recovered from. The club was torn apart for months in a power struggle between Rocher and dissidents led by lawyer André Buffard. Herbin sided with reform and was initially able to keep his job, but was dismissed in January 1983 after failing to halt the club's slide down the table. Saint-Étienne finished the season in 14th, and were relegated to Division 2 the following season.

=== After Saint-Étienne ===
==== Lyon ====
He was instantly hired by Saint-Étienne's Rhone derby rivals Lyon, but was unable to prevent their relegation three months later. He stayed with Lyon for two more seasons in Division 2, but was unable to win promotion back to the top flight, and his contract was not renewed after the 1984–85 season.

==== Al-Nassr ====
Following his tenure at Lyon, Herbin headed to Saudi Arabia side Al-Nassr, bringing with him Hervé Gauthier as an assistant. He lasted there for only one year, however, before deciding to return to France to seek a new challenge. Whilst waiting for a new managerial post, he spent some time advising Division 3 side FC Valence.

==== Strasbourg ====
In September 1986, Herbin replaced Francis Piasecki as manager of RC Strasbourg, overseen by then club president Daniel Hechter. He was unable to improve the fortunes of a side stuck in the mid-table of Division 2, and left the club at the end of the season.

==== Return to Saint-Étienne ====
In the summer of 1987, in a sensational move, Herbin returned to Saint-Étienne, who had just managed to retain their place in Division 1 having been promoted the season prior. His reappointment was the result of pressure from the Guichard family, influential shareholders in the club, on the club president. His first season with the club saw a very promising fourth-place finish, but the momentum did not last, with Herbin's managerial style no longer having the same effect it used to. Les Verts fell into mid-table, and Herbin left the club in the spring of 1990.

==== Red Star FC ====
In 1991, Herbin took charge at Red Star FC, at the time a stable Division 2 outfit, and was joined in 1992 by former player Pierre Repellini, who became Herbin's assistant. As he had done at Saint-Étienne, Herbin relied on bringing young players into the first team from the club's youth system, including future France international Steve Marlet, and aimed to achieve promotion with the club. The hoped-for promotion never materialised, however, with a fourth-place finish in 1992-93 the closest the club got under Herbin, and he left the club at the end of his contract in the summer of 1995.

==== Final spell at Saint-Étienne ====
Throughout this period, Herbin also sat on the Federal Council of the French Football Federation, a position he left in the late 1990s. He returned to Saint-Étienne for one final time in 1997 as assistant manager to Pierre Repellini. By this stage, the club had been relegated to Division 2 and were in dire financial straits. In his final season with Les Verts, they only narrowly avoided further disaster in the form of relegation to the Championnat National by finishing seventeenth. Robert Nouzaret replaced Repellini, and Herbin too departed the club, retiring from football for good in the process.

== Later years and death ==
In retirement, he lived alone with his dog near Saint-Étienne and avoided social events, while also suffering from alcohol and tobacco abuse. Up until his final days, he continued to publish a column in regional daily newspaper Le Progrès after every AS Saint-Étienne league match on a voluntary basis.

Herbin died in Saint-Étienne on the 27 April 2020, having been in hospital for several days. Tributes came in from throughout French football, both from former players, former competitors, and from the president of the French Football Federation, Noël Le Graët, the latter whom described Herbin as a "monument of football".

== Legacy ==
Herbin is still the manager who oversaw the most Saint-Étienne matches, 514, of which he won nearly half (256, so 49.8%).

In September 2021, Saint-Étienne named its youth development centre the "Centre Robert-Herbin" in his honour.

== Honours ==
=== As a player ===
Saint-Étienne

- Ligue 1: 1963–64, 1966–67, 1967–68, 1968–69, 1969–70
- Coupe de France: 1961–62, 1967–68, 1969–70
- Trophée des Champions: 1962, 1967, 1968, 1969

Individual

- So Foot Top 1000 Best Players of the French First Division: 86th

=== As a manager ===
Saint-Étienne

- Ligue 1: 1973–74, 1974–75, 1975–76, 1980–81
- Coupe de France: 1973–74, 1974–75, 1976–77
- European Cup: Runner-up 1975–76

Individual

- France Football's French Manager of the Year: 1973, 1976
