= 1977 Coupe de France final =

- Event: 1976–77 Coupe de France
Saint-Étienne	Reims
2	1
- Date: 18 June 1977
- Venue: Parc des Princes, Paris
- Referee: Georges Konrath
- Attendance: 45,454

The 1977 Coupe de France final was a football match held at Parc des Princes, Paris on 18 June 1977, that saw AS Saint-Étienne defeat Stade de Reims 2–1 thanks to goals by Dominique Bathenay and Alain Merchadier.

== Match details ==
18 June 1977

Saint-Étienne	2–1	Reims
Bathenay 85'; Merchadier 89'		Santamaría 63'

Parc des Princes, Paris
Attendance: 45,454
Referee: Georges Konrath

GK	(Socialist Federal Republic of Yugoslavia) Ivan Ćurković	(c)
DF	(France) Alain Merchadier
DF	(Argentina) Oswaldo Piazza
DF	(France) Christian Lopez
DF	(France) Gérard Farison
MF	(France) Jacques Santini
MF	(France) Gérard Janvion
MF	(France) Dominique Bathenay
FW	(France) Dominique Rocheteau
FW	(France) Hervé Revelli
FW	(France) Patrick Revelli
Substitutes:
Manager:
(France) Robert Herbin Assistant Referees: Fourth Official:

GK
DF
DF
DF
DF
MF
MF
MF
FW
FW
FW
Substitutes:
FW
Manager:
(France) Pierre Flamion

(France) Christian Laudu
(France) Patrice Buisset
(France) Régis Durand
(France) Jean-Claude Dubouil
(France) René Masclaux	(c)
(France) Alain Polaniok	(substituted off) 75'
(France) Daniel Ravier
(France) André Betta
(Argentina) Santiago Santamaria
(France) Guy Maufroy
(France) Bernard Ducuing
(France) Gerardo Gianetta	(substituted in) 75'

== See also ==
- Coupe de France 1976-77
