= Georges Polny =

French football player and manager (born 1943)

Personal information
- Date of birth: 3 February 1943 (age 83)
- Place of birth: Blan, France
- Height: 1.72 m (5 ft 8 in)
- Position: Defender

Senior career*
Years	Team	Apps	(Gls)
1960–1972	Saint-Étienne	284	(2)
1972–1974	Monaco	55	(3)
1974–1977	Rouen	61	(0)
Total		400	(5)

Managerial career
- 1977–1979: Beauvais
- 1979–1980: Poitiers
- * Club domestic league appearances and goals

Georges Polny (born 3 February 1943) is a French former professional football player and manager. As a player, he was a defender. He most notably played for Saint-Étienne from 1960 to 1972, where he won thirteen trophies, including five Division 1 league titles. Later in his career, he played for Monaco and Rouen, before his retirement in 1977. He went on to coach Beauvais from 1977 to 1979 and Poitiers from 1979 to 1980.

== Honours ==
Saint-Étienne

- Division 1: 1963–64, 1966–67, 1967–68, 1968–69, 1969–70
- Division 2: 1962–63
- Coupe de France: 1961–62, 1967–68, 1969–70
- Challenge des Champions: 1962, 1967, 1968, 1969

Monaco

- Coupe de France runner-up: 1973–74
