= 1969–70 Coupe de France =

Tournament details
- Country: France

The Coupe de France's results of the 1969–70 season. AS Saint-Étienne won the final played on May 31, 1970, beating FC Nantes.

== Round of 16 ==
Team 1	Agg.	Team 2	1st leg	2nd leg	3rd leg
Stade Rennais (D1)	4–3	Olympique Lyonnais (D1)	3–2	1–1	
Nîmes Olympique (D1)	2–4	AS Saint-Étienne (D1)	1–0	1–2	0–2
Angers SCO (D1)	6–4	SC Bastia (D1)	2–0	1–3	3–1
SC Toulon (D2)	2–3	US Valenciennes (D1)	2–0	0–2	0–1
OGC Nice (D2)	2–3	FC Metz (D1)	2–1	0–1	0–1
Le Mans Union Club 72 (CFA)	0–6	FC Nantes (D1)	0–4	0–2	
AC Arles (CFA)	0–5	Limoges FC (D2)	0–1	0–4	
Baume-les-Dames (CFA)	2–4	SC Neuilly (D2)	1–2	1–2	

== Quarter-finals ==
Team 1	Agg.	Team 2	1st leg	2nd leg	3rd leg
Angers SCO (D1)	2–4	FC Nantes (D1)	2–2	0–2	
FC Metz (D1)	1–6	AS Saint-Étienne (D1)	1–1	0–5	
Stade Rennais (D1)	7–1	Limoges FC (D2)	3–1	4–0	
SC Neuilly (D2)	3–4	US Valenciennes (D1)	2–1	0–1	1–2

== Semi-finals ==
First round

9 May 1970

Stade Rennais (1)	0–1	AS Saint-Étienne (1)
	(Report)	Keita 4'

9 May 1970

US Valenciennes (1)	0–2	FC Nantes (1)
	(Report)	Levavasseur 66'; Gondet 69'

Second round

15 May 1970

AS Saint-Étienne (1)	1–1	Stade Rennais (1)
Larqué 10'	(Report)	Lenoir 79'

15 May 1970

FC Nantes (1)	0–0	US Valenciennes (1)
	(Report)

== Final ==
31 May 1970

Saint-Étienne	5–0	Nantes
Parizon 26'; Bereta 40'; Herbin 51'; Revelli 74', 87'

Stade Olympique Yves-du-Manoir, Colombes
Attendance: 32,894
Referee: Robert Helies
