= Blan =

Blan may refer to:

== People ==
- Albert Blan (1930–2015), English rugby league football player
- Billy Blan (1922–2008), English rugby league football player
- Sidney Herbert Blan (1877–1963), American politician

== Fictional characters ==
- Lillet Blan, character in GrimGrimoire
- Mashiro Blan, character in My-HiME

== Places ==
- Blan, Tarn, France

== Events ==
- bLAN, LAN-party in Gloppen, Norway
