= Albert Locke =

English footballer and manager (1898–?)

Personal information
- Date of birth: 1898
- Place of birth: England
- Height: 1.73 m (5 ft 8 in)
- Position: Striker

Senior career*
Years	Team	Apps	(Gls)
- Le Havre
–1934	Saint-Étienne		

Managerial career
- 1932–1934: Saint-Étienne
- * Club domestic league appearances and goals

Albert Locke was an English professional football player and manager.

== Career ==
Locke played club football for the French teams Le Havre and Saint-Étienne.

He also managed Saint-Étienne between 1932 and 1934.
