= Harold Rivers =

English footballer and manager

Personal information
- Place of birth: Walbottle, England
- Position: Defender

Senior career*
Years	Team	Apps	(Gls)
	Southampton	0	(0)
–1933	Sète	?	(?)
1933–1936	Saint-Étienne	?	(?)
1937–1939	Arras	?	(?)

Managerial career
- 1933–1934: Saint-Étienne
- * Club domestic league appearances and goals

Harold Rivers was an English professional football player and manager.

== Career ==
After beginning his career in England with Southampton, Rivers moved to France to play with Sète, Saint-Étienne and Arras.

While at Saint-Étienne, Rivers managed the first-team between 1933 and 1934.
