= Kévin Pedro =

French footballer

Personal information
- Date of birth: 21 February 2006 (age 20)
- Place of birth: Carcassonne, France
- Height: 1.83 m (6 ft 0 in)
- Position: Centre-back

Team information
- Current team: Saint-Étienne
- Number: 39

Youth career
- 2012–2013: FC Épinay Athletico
- 2013–2014: Viry-Châtillon
- 2014–2017: Tremplin Foot
- 2017–2021: US Ris-Orangis
- 2021–2023: Saint-Étienne

Senior career*
Years	Team	Apps	(Gls)
2023–2025	Saint-Étienne II	23	(0)
2024–	Saint-Étienne	19	(2)

International career^{‡}
2021	France U16	3	(0)
2024	France U19	2	(0)
2026–	DR Congo	2	(0)
- * Club domestic league appearances and goals as of 00:21, 18 May 2026 (UTC) ‡ National team caps and goals as of 00:21, 12 November 2026 (UTC)

Kévin Pedro (born 21 February 2006) is a professional footballer who plays as a centre-back for Ligue 2 club Saint-Étienne. Born in France, he plays for the DR Congo national team.

== Club career ==
Pedro is a product of the youth academies of FC Épinay Athletico, Viry-Châtillon, Tremplin Foot, US Ris-Orangis and Saint-Étienne. He made his senior and professional debut with Saint-Étienne as a substitute in a 1–0 Ligue 1 loss to Monaco on 1 August 2024.

== International career ==
Born in France, Pedro is of DR Congolese descent. In September 2024, he was called up to the France U19s for a friendly tournament.

Pedro was one of the players who were called up with the DR Congo national team by head coach Sébastien Desabre for the 2027 Africa Cup of Nations qualification matches against Equatorial Guinea (24 September 2026), Zimbabwe (28 September) and the 2 friendlies against Uganda (2 and 5 October).
