= Patrick Parizon =

French football manager (born 1950)

Personal information
- Date of birth: 3 June 1950 (age 76)
- Place of birth: Le Creusot, France
- Height: 1.70 m (5 ft 7 in)
- Position: Striker

Youth career
- 1958–1967: Montceau

Senior career*
Years	Team	Apps	(Gls)
1967–1973	Saint-Étienne	85	(9)
1968–1969	→ Paris Joinville (loan)	25	(2)
1973–1975	Troyes	60	(9)
1975–1977	Lille	82	(14)
1977–1980	Sochaux	84	(9)
1980–1983	Brest	75	(7)
1983–1984	Evian	35	(3)
1984–1985	Niort	30	(4)

International career
1975	France	3	(1)

Managerial career
- 1984–1988: Niort
- 1989–1991: Grenoble
- 1991–1992: Melun-Dammarie
- 1992–1994: Amiens
- 1994–1995: Rouen
- 1996–1998: Martigues
- 1999–2000: Ivory Coast
- 2002–2003: Mauritius
- 2004: Paris FC
- 2005–2009: Caen
- * Club domestic league appearances and goals

Patrick Parizon (born 3 June 1950) is a French former football player and manager. He was fired from coaching Caen in June 2009. He also served as the manager of the national football teams of Mauritius and Ivory Coast.
