= Vincent Estève =

French footballer (born 1945)

Personal information
- Date of birth: 21 July 1945 (age 81)
- Place of birth: Meknès, Morocco
- Position: Defender

Senior career*
Years	Team	Apps	(Gls)
1963–1967	Cannes		
1967–1970	Nantes		
1970–1973	Toulon		

International career
1968	France	1	(0)
- * Club domestic league appearances and goals

Vincent Estève (born 21 July 1945) is a French former professional footballer who played defender for Cannes, Nantes, Toulon.
