= Blan, Tarn =

Blan
- Commune
- Coat of arms
- Location of Blan
- Location within France Location within Occitanie
- Coordinates: 43°31′40″N 2°00′32″E
- Country: France
- Region: Occitania
- Department: Tarn
- Arrondissement: Castres
- Canton: Le Pastel
- Intercommunality: CC aux sources du Canal du Midi

Government
  - Mayor (2020–2026): Jean Louis Barreau
- Area^{1}: 13.3 km^{2} (5.1 sq mi)
- Elevation: 195 m (640 ft)
- Highest elevation: 232 m (761 ft)
- Lowest elevation: 175 m (574 ft)
- Population (2023): 1,093
  - Density: 82.2/km^{2} (213/sq mi)
- Time zone: UTC+01:00 (CET)
  - Summer (DST): UTC+02:00 (CEST)
- INSEE/Postal code: 81032 /81700
- ^{1} French Land Register data, which excludes lakes, ponds, glaciers > 1 km^{2} (0.386 sq mi or 247 acres) and river estuaries.

Blan (French pronunciation: [blɑ̃]) is a commune in the Tarn department in southern France.

== Notable people ==
- Georges Polny, football player and manager
