= Roger Rocher =

French businessman

Roger Rocher (February 6, 1920, Champlost–March 29, 1997, Saint-Étienne) was a French businessman. He was president of AS Saint-Étienne from 1961 to 1982.
