= Pierre Repellini =

French footballer and manager (born 1950)

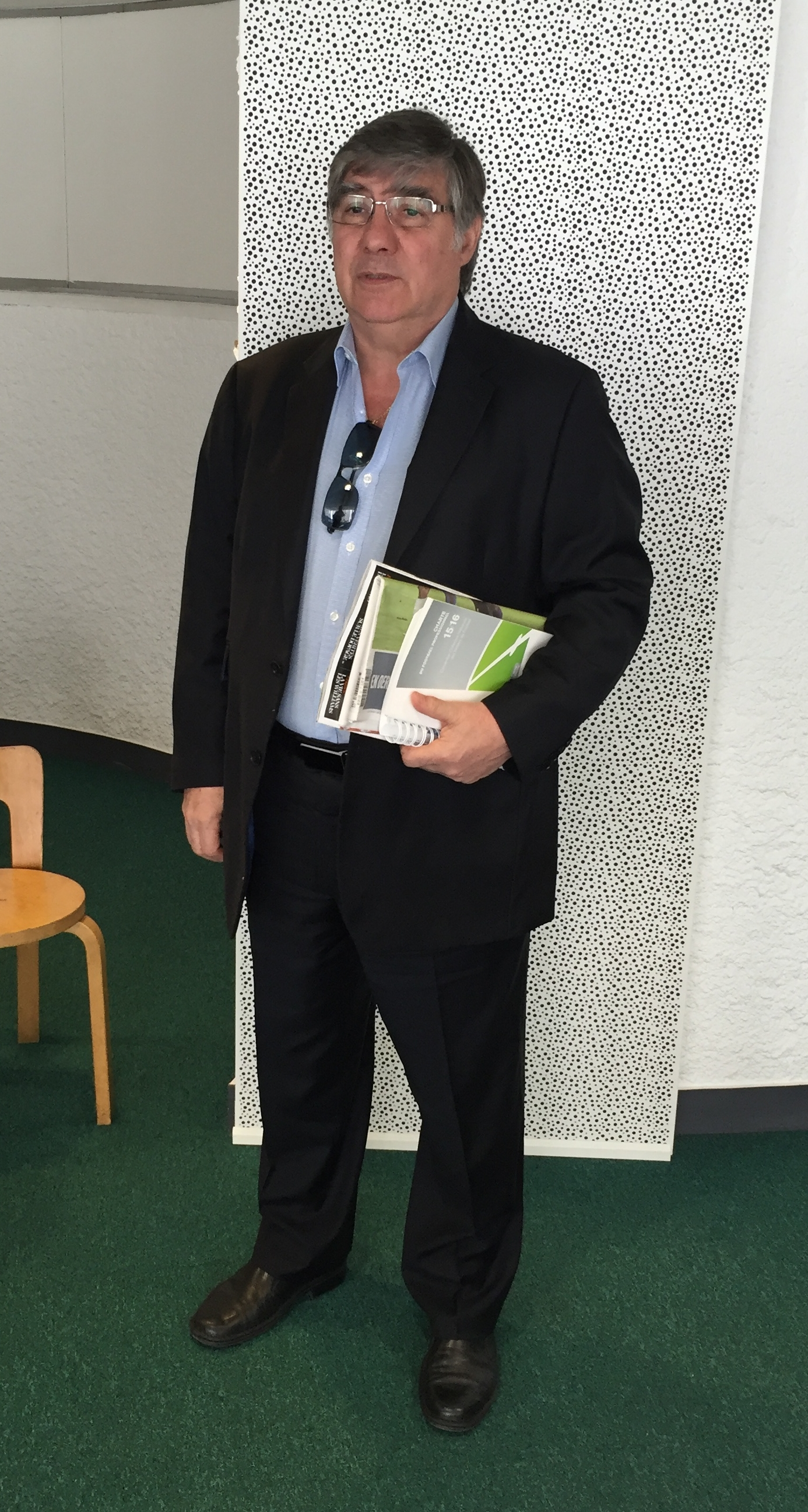

Personal information
- Full name: Pierre Repellini
- Date of birth: October 27, 1950 (age 76)
- Place of birth: Hyères, France
- Height: 1.73 m (5 ft 8 in)
- Position: Defender

Senior career*
Years	Team	Apps	(Gls)
1970–1980	AS Saint-Étienne		
1980–1983	Hyères FC		

International career
1973–1974	France	4	(0)

Managerial career
- 1995–1996: Red Star FC
- 1997–1998: AS Saint-Étienne
- 2000: Red Star FC
- 2001: Red Star FC
- * Club domestic league appearances and goals

Pierre Repellini (born 27 October 1950) is a French former football defender and manager. He is a historic player of AS Saint-Etienne, and won many trophies with les Verts as a covering defender or midfield anchor before ending his career in his native town of Hyères with Hyères FC. He later had a stints as a coach at Red Star FC and AS Saint-Etienne.

== Titles ==
- As a player
  - French championship in 1970, 1974, 1975, 1976 with AS Saint-Étienne
  - Coupe de France 1974, 1975, and 1977 with AS Saint-Étienne
  - European Cup runner-up in 1976 with AS Saint-Étienne
