= Gérard Farison =

French footballer (1944–2021)

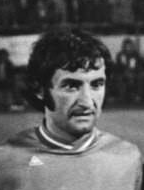
- Farison in 1976

Personal information
- Date of birth: 15 March 1944
- Place of birth: Saint-Jean-Bonnefonds, France
- Date of death: 8 September 2021 (aged 77)
- Place of death: Saint-Raphaël, France
- Position: Defender

Senior career*
Years	Team	Apps	(Gls)
1968–1980	Saint-Étienne	329	(7)
- ES Fréjus

International career
1976	France	1	(0)

Managerial career
- 1982–1983: ES Fréjus
- * Club domestic league appearances and goals

Gérard Farison (15 March 1944 – 8 September 2021) was a French professional footballer who played as a defender.
