= Alain Giresse =

French football manager (born 1952)

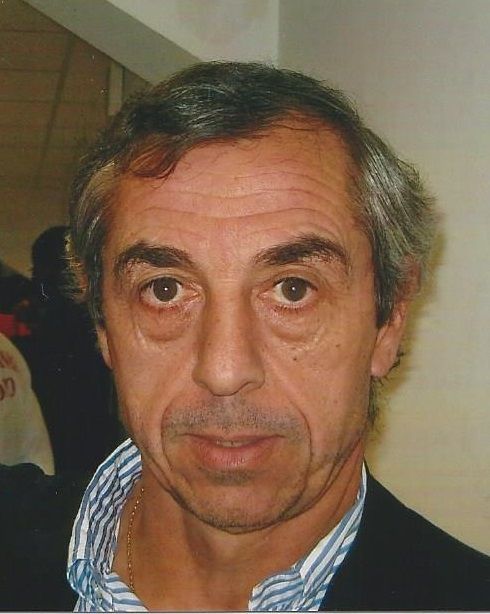
- Giresse in 2010

Personal information
- Full name: Alain Jean Giresse
- Date of birth: 2 August 1952 (age 74)
- Place of birth: Langoiran, Gironde, France
- Height: 1.63 m (5 ft 4 in)
- Position: Midfielder

Senior career*
Years	Team	Apps	(Gls)
1970–1986	Bordeaux	519	(158)
1986–1988	Marseille	67	(5)
Total		586	(163)

International career
1974–1986	France	47	(6)

Managerial career
- 1995–1998: Toulouse
- 1998: Paris Saint-Germain
- 1999–2000: Toulouse
- 2001–2003: FAR Rabat
- 2004–2005: Georgia
- 2006–2010: Gabon
- 2010–2012: Mali
- 2013–2015: Senegal
- 2015–2017: Mali
- 2018–2019: Tunisia
- 2022–2023: Kosovo
Medal record
Men's football
Representing France (as player)
FIFA World Cup
Third place	1986
UEFA European Championship
Winner	1984
CONMEBOL–UEFA Cup of Champions
Winner	1985
Representing Mali (as manager)
Africa Cup of Nations
Bronze medal – third place	2012
- * Club domestic league appearances and goals

Alain Jean Giresse (French pronunciation: [alɛ̃ ʒiʁɛs]; born 2 August 1952) is a French football coach and former player who last managed Kosovo.

Giresse was French Player of the Year in 1982, 1983 and 1987. Nominally an attacking or central midfielder, he was an intelligent playmaker who possessed fine agility and acceleration due to his short frame. He is the father of Thibault Giresse, also a football coach and former player.

== International career ==
Giresse played for the France national team in the 1982 FIFA World Cup (fourth place) and the 1986 FIFA World Cup (third place). He was a member of the Euro 84 winning team, and alongside Michel Platini, Luis Fernández and Jean Tigana, forming the team's legendary "Carré Magique" (Magic Square) in midfield.

== Coaching career ==
=== Other national teams ===
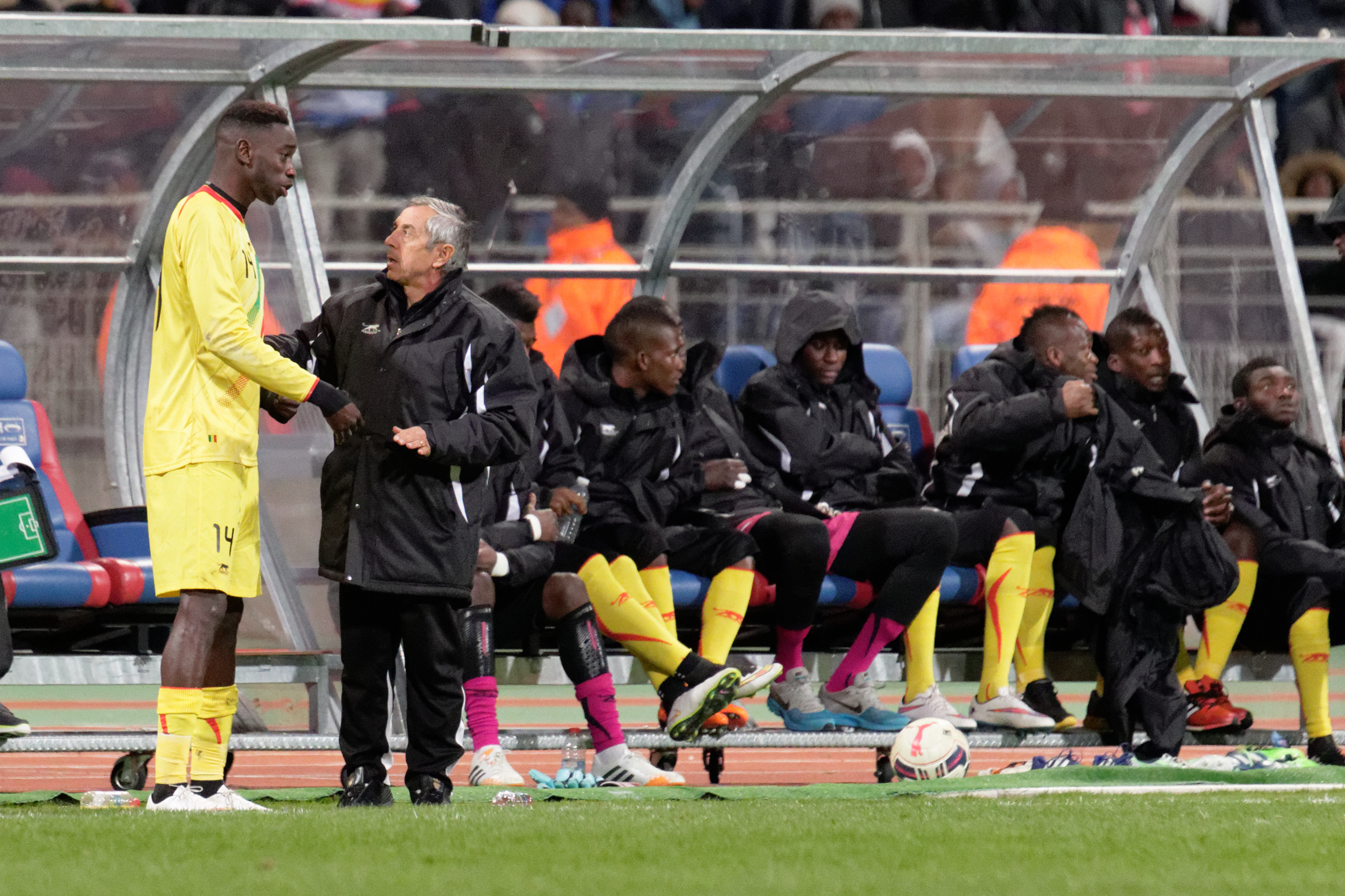
Alain Giresse managing Mali in 2015.

He has been in charge of Toulouse and the Georgian national team, among others. Giresse worked as the head coach of Gabon, and was named a few months after the 2010 African Cup of Nations the Mali manager. He was the coach of Senegal national football team from 2013 to January 2015.

On 7 September 2017, Giresse resigned as manager of the Mali national team.

In December 2017, he was linked with the vacant Benin manager's job. In April 2018 he was one of 77 applicants for the vacant Cameroon national job.

On 13 December 2018, Giresse became the manager of Tunisia. He left the role in August 2019.

On 23 February 2022, Kosovo appointed Giresse after agreeing to a contract until November 2023, this happened after the former coach Bernard Challandes decided to resign after weak results in October 2021. On 18 March 2022, Giresse made his first squad announcement with Kosovo for the friendly matches against Burkina Faso and Switzerland. He called-up Emir Sahiti for the first time in the squad.

== Career statistics ==
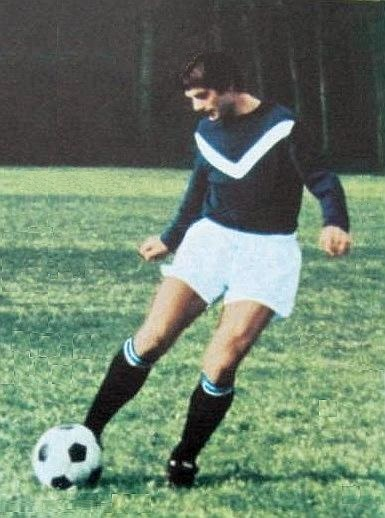
Giresse in 1971

=== Club ===
Club	Season	League			Coupe de France		Europe		Total	
Club	Season	Division	Apps	Goals	Apps	Goals	Apps	Goals	Apps	Goals
Bordeaux	1970–71	Division 1	24	3	5	0	-	-	29	3
Bordeaux	1971–72	Division 1	27	4	0	0	-	-	27	4
Bordeaux	1972–73	Division 1	22	3	0	0	-	-	22	3
Bordeaux	1973–74	Division 1	31	12	0	0	-	-	31	12
Bordeaux	1974–75	Division 1	36	11	4	1	-	-	40	12
Bordeaux	1975–76	Division 1	30	13	1	0	-	-	31	13
Bordeaux	1976–77	Division 1	37	16	4	0	-	-	41	16
Bordeaux	1977–78	Division 1	35	11	5	4	-	-	40	15
Bordeaux	1978–79	Division 1	38	6	3	1	-	-	41	7
Bordeaux	1979–80	Division 1	37	12	1	0	-	-	38	12
Bordeaux	1980–81	Division 1	34	6	6	2	-	-	40	8
Bordeaux	1981–82	Division 1	34	14	7	4	3	0	44	18
Bordeaux	1982–83	Division 1	35	12	5	1	6	6	46	19
Bordeaux	1983–84	Division 1	34	16	5	1	2	1	41	18
Bordeaux	1984–85	Division 1	36	11	1	0	8	0	45	11
Bordeaux	1985–86	Division 1	29	9	5	1	2	0	36	10
Bordeaux	Total		519	158	52	15	21	7	592	180
Marseille	1986–87	Division 1	34	4	8	2	-	-	42	6
Marseille	1987–88	Division 1	33	1	1	0	7	1	41	2
Marseille	Total		67	5	9	2	7	1	83	8
Career total			586	163	61	17	28	8	675	188

=== International ===
France
Year	Apps	Goals
1974	1	0
1975	0	0
1976	0	0
1977	2	0
1978	2	0
1979	0	0
1980	0	0
1981	5	0
1982	11	3
1983	4	0
1984	10	2
1985	5	1
1986	7	0
Total	47	6

== Managerial statistics ==
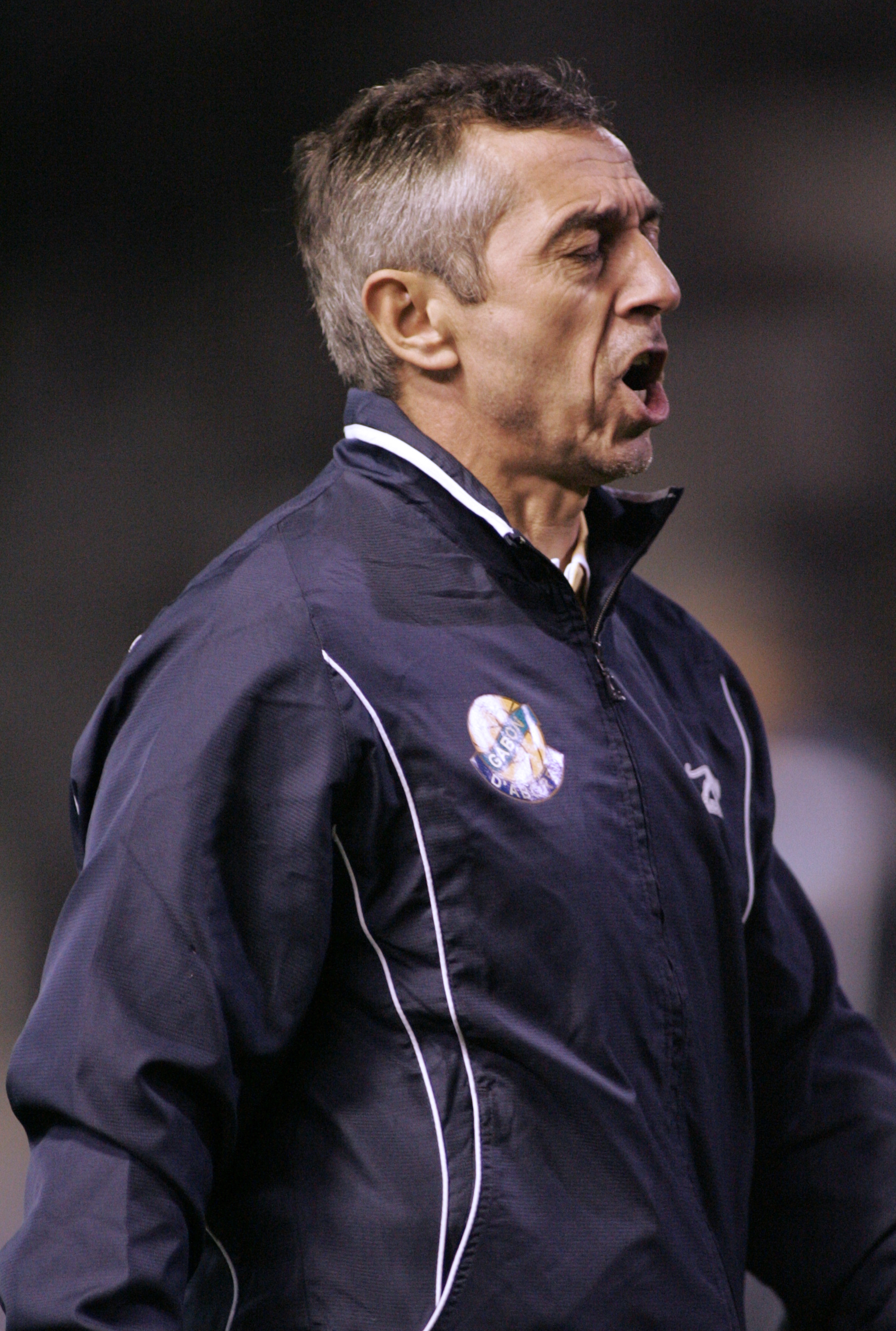
Alain Giresse managing Gabon in 2009.

As of 19 June 2023

Team	From	To	Record				
Team	From	To	G	W	D	L	Win %
Toulouse	1 November 1995	30 June 1998	109	44	25	40	40.37
Paris Saint-Germain	1 July 1998	23 October 1998	12	4	3	5	33.33
Toulouse	26 January 1999	9 October 2000	67	26	14	27	38.81
FAR Rabat	1 July 2001	30 June 2003	59	17	23	19	28.81
Georgia	12 March 2004	30 June 2005	10	2	2	6	20.00
Gabon	3 March 2006	13 February 2010	31	16	7	8	51.61
Mali	21 April 2010	30 May 2012	16	8	2	6	50.00
Senegal	9 January 2013	29 January 2015	18	7	8	3	38.89
Mali	17 March 2015	7 September 2017	16	8	4	4	50.00
Tunisia	14 December 2018	21 August 2019	12	5	4	3	41.67
Kosovo	23 February 2022	20 June 2023	15	4	7	4	26.67
Total			365	141	99	125	38.63

== Honours ==
=== Player ===
Bordeaux

- French Division 1: 1983–84, 1984–85
- Coupe de France: 1985–86

France

- UEFA European Championship: 1984
- Artemio Franchi Trophy: 1985
- FIFA World Cup Third place: 1986

Individual

- UEFA European Championship Team of the Tournament: 1984
- Onze d'Argent: 1982
- Ballon d'Or – Runner-up: 1982
- French Player of the Year: 1982, 1983, 1987
- World XI: 1982, 1983, 1984, 1985, 1986
- Onze Mondial: 1982, 1983, 1984
- 7th French Player of the Century

=== Manager ===
Paris Saint-Germain

- Trophée des Champions: 1998

FAR Rabat

- Coupe du Trône: 2003

Mali

- Africa Cup of Nations Third place: 2012

=== Orders ===
- Knight of the Legion of Honour: 2006
