= Bernard Bosquier =

French footballer (born 1942)

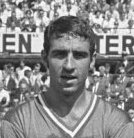

Personal information
- Date of birth: 19 June 1942 (age 84)
- Place of birth: Thonon-les-Bains, Haute-Savoie, France
- Height: 1.78 m (5 ft 10 in)
- Position: Defender

Youth career
- 1958–1959: Olympique Alès

Senior career*
Years	Team	Apps	(Gls)
1959–1961	Olympique Alès	30	(2)
1961–1966	Sochaux	150	(16)
1966–1971	Saint-Étienne	167	(20)
1971–1974	Marseille	93	(11)
1974–1976	FC Martigues	35	(4)
Total		475	(53)

International career
1964–1972	France	42	(3)

Managerial career
- 1980–1981: Saint-Étienne (Sport director)
- 1989–1990: Marseille (Sport director)
- * Club domestic league appearances and goals

Bernard Bosquier (born 19 June 1942) is a French former professional footballer who played as a defender. He made 42 appearances for the France national team scoring three goals.

== Career ==
Bosquier came up from Olympique Alès, and signed with FC Sochaux-Montbéliard in 1961, where he became an excellent defender playing at right back before moving to centre back later at Olympique Marseille.

He quickly earned his first cap for France on 2 December 1964, aged 22, against Belgium. He was then part of France squad at the FIFA World Cup 1966 in England playing in all France's games.

Coming back from the World Cup he signed with AS Saint-Étienne, where he won his first titles and was widely regarded as the best French footballer of the 1960s, winning the French player of the year award in 1967 and 1968.

He surprisingly left Forez for Olympique Marseille along with goalkeeper Georges Carnus in 1971 winning the "double" with Olympique Marseille in his first season. He finished his football career at FC Martigues eventually making 354 appearances in 11 seasons. His goalscoring record of 43 goals in very good for a defender and was helped by his great free-kick prowess.

He had then a short career of sport director and discovered talented players such as Grégory Coupet or Ľubomír Moravčík when he worked for AS Saint-Étienne. He currently organises coaching for young footballers.

== Honours ==
Sochaux

- Coupe Charles Drago: 1962–63, 1963–64
- Division 2 runner-up: 1963–64

Saint-Étienne

- Division 1: 1966–67, 1967–68, 1968–69, 1969–70; runner-up: 1970–71
- Coupe de France: 1967–68, 1969–70
- Trophée des Champions: 1967, 1968, 1969

Marseille

- Division 1: 1971–72
- Coupe de France: 1971–72

Individual

- French Footballer of the Year: 1967, 1968
