= 1967–68 Coupe de France =

Tournament details
- Country: France

The Coupe de France's results of the 1967–68 season. AS Saint-Étienne won the final played on May 12, 1968, beating Girondins de Bordeaux.

== Round of 16 ==
Team 1	Score	Team 2
AS Saint-Étienne (D1)	2–1	Angers SCO (D1)
FC Metz (D1)	2–1	AS Nancy (D2)
AS Angoulême (D2)	2–0	FC Rouen (D1)
FC Sochaux-Montbéliard (D1)	2–1	FC Nantes (D1)
Girondins de Bordeaux (D1)	2–0	Gazélec Ajaccio (CFA)
RC Strasbourg (D1)	0–0 (a.e.t.)	Red Star (D1)
US Quevilly (CFA)	1–0	Olympique Lyonnais (D1)
USL Dunkerque (D2)	1–0	OGC Nice (D1)
Replay
RC Strasbourg (D1)	1–0	Red Star (D1)

== Quarter-finals ==
Team 1	Score	Team 2
AS Saint-Étienne (D1)	1–0	FC Metz (D1)
AS Angoulême (D2)	2–1 (a.e.t.)	FC Sochaux-Montbéliard (D1)
Girondins de Bordeaux (D1)	1–1 (a.e.t.)	RC Strasbourg (D1)
US Quevilly (CFA)	4–0	USL Dunkerque (D2)
Replay
Girondins de Bordeaux (D1)	2–1	RC Strasbourg (D1)

== Semi-finals ==
17 April 1968

AS Saint-Étienne (1)	1–1 (a.e.t.)	AS Angoulême (2)
Mekhloufi 29'	(Report)	Grizzetti 33'

20 April 1968

Girondins de Bordeaux (1)	2–1 (a.e.t.)	US Quevilly (3)
Massé 34'; Duhayot 99'	(Report)	Leroy 13'

Replay

1 May 1968

AS Saint-Étienne (1)	2–1	AS Angoulême (2)
Herbin 26'; Revelli 70'	(Report)	Grizzetti 83'

== Final ==
12 May 1968

Saint-Étienne	2–1	Bordeaux
Mekhloufi 30', 78'		Wojciak 5'

Stade Olympique Yves-du-Manoir, Colombes
Attendance: 33,959
Referee: Roger Barde
