= Gérard Janvion =

French footballer (born 1953)

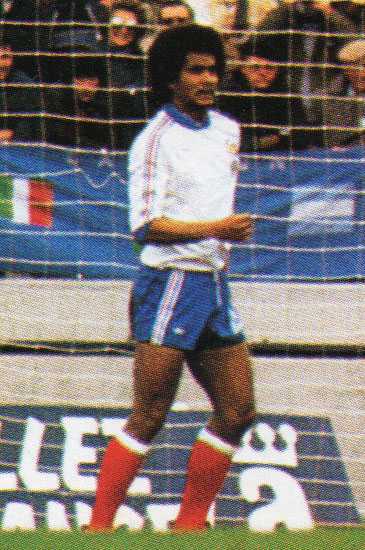
- Janvion playing for France at the 1978 FIFA World Cup

Personal information
- Date of birth: 21 August 1953 (age 73)
- Place of birth: Fort-de-France, Martinique
- Height: 1.72 m (5 ft 8 in)
- Position: Defender

Youth career
- 1965–1972: CS Case-Pilote

Senior career*
Years	Team	Apps	(Gls)
1972–1983	Saint-Étienne	301	(8)
1983–1985	Paris Saint-Germain	42	(0)
1985–1987	Béziers	39	(1)
Total		382	(9)

International career
1975–1982	France	40	(0)
- * Club domestic league appearances and goals

Gérard Janvion (French pronunciation: [ʒeʁaʁ ʒɑ̃vjɔ̃]; born 21 August 1953) is a French former professional footballer who played as a defender. A French international from 1975 to 1982 he made 40 appearances for the France national team. Having started his senior career in 1972 at Saint-Étienne he went on to spend most of playing days there before joining Paris Saint-Germain in 1983. He retired from playing in 1987 after a two-year stint with Béziers.

== Club career ==
Janvion started his career in Martinique with the local side CS Case-Pilote. He played professionally for AS Saint-Étienne (1972–83), where he competed alongside Michel Platini, and for Paris Saint-Germain (1983–85) before retiring at AS Béziers.

Janvion was also the manager of Martinique's top-level side CS Case-Pilote in the 2007–08 season.

== International career ==
From 1975 to 1982, Janvion earned 40 caps for France. He also participated in two World Cups (1978 and 1982).

== Career statistics ==
=== International ===
Appearances and goals by national team and year
National team	Year	Apps	Goals
France	1975	1	0
France	1976	4	0
France	1977	6	0
France	1978	7	0
France	1979	2	0
France	1980	3	0
France	1981	8	0
France	1982	9	0
Total		40	0

== Honours ==
Saint-Étienne

- Division 1: 1973–74, 1974–75, 1975–76, 1980–81
- Coupe de France: 1973–74, 1974–75, 1976–77
