= 1967–68 French Division 1 =

30th season of French Division 1

Division Nationale
- Season: 1967–68
- Dates: 17 August 1967 – 5 July 1968
- Champions: Saint-Étienne (4th title)
- Relegated: Lens; Angers; Lille; Aix-en-Provence
- European Cup: Saint-Étienne
- Cup Winners' Cup: Bordeaux
- Inter-Cities Fairs Cup: Nice; Marseille; Metz; Lyon
- Matches: 380
- Goals: 1,002 (2.64 per match)
- Top goalscorer: Étienne Sansonetti (26 goals)

AS Saint-Étienne won Division 1 season 1967/1968 of the French Association Football League with 57 points.

== Participating teams ==
- AS Aixoise
- AC Ajaccio
- Angers SCO
- Bordeaux
- RC Lens
- Lille OSC
- Olympique Lyonnais
- Olympique de Marseille
- FC Metz
- AS Monaco
- FC Nantes
- OGC Nice
- Red Star FC
- Stade Rennais UC
- FC Rouen
- AS Saint-Étienne
- RC Paris-Sedan
- FC Sochaux-Montbéliard
- RC Strasbourg
- US Valenciennes-Anzin
Location of teams in 1967–68 Division 1

== League table ==
Pos	Team	Pld	W	D	L	GF	GA	GD	Pts	Qualification or relegation
1	Saint-Étienne (C)	38	24	9	5	78	30	+48	57	Qualification to European Cup first round
2	Nice	38	18	10	10	49	41	+8	46	Invited to Inter-Cities Fairs Cup
3	Sochaux	38	16	11	11	48	39	+9	43	
4	Marseille	38	17	9	12	49	46	+3	43	Invited to Inter-Cities Fairs Cup
5	Valenciennes	38	17	8	13	42	34	+8	42	
6	Metz	38	15	12	11	49	44	+5	42	Invited to Inter-Cities Fairs Cup
7	Nantes	38	15	11	12	55	50	+5	41	
8	Bordeaux	38	18	4	16	57	44	+13	40	Qualification to Cup Winners' Cup first round (Note: Bordeaux qualified for 1968–69 European Cup Winners' Cup as runners-up of the 1967–68 Coupe de France as cup winners Saint-Étienne also won the league and qualified for the European Cup.)
9	Ajaccio	38	16	7	15	59	59	0	39	
10	RC Paris-Sedan	38	15	8	15	56	47	+9	38	
11	Monaco	38	15	7	16	45	48	−3	37	
12	Lyon	38	12	12	14	53	51	+2	36	Invited to Inter-Cities Fairs Cup
13	Red Star	38	12	12	14	44	43	+1	36	
14	Rennes	38	13	10	15	49	57	−8	36	
15	Rouen	38	15	5	18	48	51	−3	35	
16	Strasbourg (O)	38	13	8	17	34	40	−6	34	Qualification to relegation play-offs
17	Lens (R)	38	13	8	17	48	61	−13	34	Qualification to relegation play-offs
18	Angers (R)	38	12	10	16	56	70	−14	34	Relegation to French Division 2
19	Lille (R)	38	9	9	20	35	52	−17	27	Relegation to French Division 2
20	Aix-en-Provence (R)	38	6	8	24	48	95	−47	20	Relegation to French Division 2

Rules for classification: 1) points; 2) goal difference; 3) number of goals scored.
Victory: 2 points, Draw: 1 point, Defeat: 0 points
(C) Champions; (O) Play-off winners; (R) Relegated
Notes:

Promoted from Division 2, who will play in Division 1 season 1968/1969

- SEC Bastia: Champion of Division 2
- Nîmes Olympique: runner-up of Division 2

== Results ==
Home \ Away	AIX	ACA	ANG	BOR	RCL	LIL	OL	OM	MET	ASM	NAN	NIC	RS	REN	ROU	STE	RPS	SOC	RCS	VAL
Aix-en-Provence		2–4	1–3	5–1	2–2	2–1	2–0	1–2	0–1	0–0	2–6	3–1	0–0	2–3	4–1	1–1	4–2	0–0	0–3	1–1
Ajaccio	8–2		4–0	3–0	2–0	2–1	2–2	2–2	2–1	1–2	5–3	2–1	0–0	2–0	5–3	1–1	2–0	1–1	1–0	1–4
Angers	9–1	3–0		0–0	1–2	1–3	3–1	2–2	0–0	3–0	1–3	1–1	2–2	1–1	3–0	1–0	2–3	1–1	1–0	1–0
Bordeaux	3–0	3–0	1–2		6–1	2–1	0–0	1–2	1–0	3–0	6–2	4–0	1–0	6–2	1–0	1–2	2–0	3–0	1–2	0–1
Lens	4–1	1–2	4–2	2–1		1–1	1–0	5–1	1–1	1–3	1–3	0–0	2–4	1–1	2–1	1–3	3–0	0–2	1–0	1–0
Lille	2–1	1–2	2–1	1–2	0–1		1–1	2–0	0–0	0–1	2–0	0–2	1–1	2–0	1–0	2–2	2–0	0–1	0–0	0–3
Lyon	4–3	2–1	8–0	2–0	3–0	1–1		3–2	3–1	1–2	0–3	1–1	0–0	2–1	2–1	1–1	0–2	2–2	0–0	0–0
Marseille	3–2	2–0	3–1	2–0	2–0	0–0	2–1		2–0	2–1	1–0	0–2	2–0	3–1	2–2	2–1	1–0	0–1	0–0	2–0
Metz	3–1	3–0	1–1	2–0	2–1	1–0	3–1	3–0		2–0	1–1	1–2	1–1	6–1	1–1	1–1	1–5	2–0	1–0	2–0
Monaco	1–1	0–1	5–0	1–2	2–3	3–1	2–1	1–0	3–1		3–0	2–2	0–1	2–1	1–3	0–3	2–1	1–0	2–1	0–1
Nantes	5–1	1–0	0–1	1–1	1–0	2–1	1–0	1–1	1–1	0–0		0–0	4–2	2–0	0–0	1–1	1–1	1–1	3–0	0–2
Nice	1–0	1–0	2–1	1–1	0–0	3–1	0–3	1–1	4–1	0–2	5–1		2–1	0–3	4–0	1–2	1–0	1–0	2–0	2–1
Red Star	2–1	4–1	3–3	1–0	3–2	0–2	1–1	2–0	0–1	2–0	0–1	1–1		3–1	0–2	1–1	3–0	1–2	0–1	1–0
Rennes	4–0	1–0	1–1	1–0	1–0	4–1	1–0	3–1	0–0	1–1	1–1	4–0	3–0		0–1	0–3	1–1	1–1	2–1	1–1
Rouen	5–0	3–1	0–1	3–0	0–1	1–0	3–1	1–2	0–0	2–1	1–2	1–0	0–2	2–0		3–0	0–0	1–0	3–2	1–2
Saint-Étienne	3–1	4–0	3–0	1–0	3–0	3–0	1–1	2–0	4–0	1–0	1–2	3–1	1–1	3–0	3–0		2–1	2–0	4–0	3–0
RC Paris-Sedan	3–0	2–0	3–1	1–2	1–1	1–1	2–3	1–1	3–0	3–0	1–0	0–1	0–0	3–0	2–0	5–2		2–0	3–1	1–1
Sochaux	1–1	3–1	2–0	0–1	4–1	2–1	3–1	1–1	3–2	0–0	1–0	0–2	1–0	1–2	3–0	0–4	3–0		1–1	3–1
Strasbourg	1–0	0–0	5–1	0–1	1–0	2–0	0–1	1–0	0–0	2–0	3–1	0–0	2–1	1–1	2–1	0–1	0–2	1–4		0–1
Valenciennes	1–0	0–0	2–1	2–0	1–1	3–0	2–0	1–0	1–2	1–1	2–1	0–1	1–0	2–1	0–2	1–2	3–1	0–0	0–1	

Legend: Blue = home team win; Yellow = draw; Red = away team win.

== Relegation play-offs ==
Pos	Team	Pld	W	D	L	GF	GA	GD	Pts	Qualification	RCS	NMS	REI	RCL
1	Strasbourg	4	2	1	1	5	3	+2	5	Qualification to French Division 1	—	3–0	2–1	
2	Nîmes	4	2	1	1	4	4	0	5	Qualification to French Division 1	0–0	—		3–1
3	Reims	4	2	1	1	8	6	+2	5	Qualification to French Division 2	2–0		—	2–2
4	Lens	4	0	1	3	5	9	−4	1	Qualification to French Division 2		0–1	2–3	—

Rules for classification: 1) points; 2) head to head; 3) goal difference; 4) number of goals scored.
Victory: 2 points, Draw: 1 point, Defeat: 0 points

== Top goalscorers ==
Rank	Player	Club	Goals
1	(France) Étienne Sansonetti	Ajaccio	26
2	(France) Hervé Revelli	Saint-Étienne	23
3	(France) Fleury Di Nallo	Lyon	18
3	(Cameroon) Joseph Yegba Maya	Marseille	18
5	(France) Lucien Cossou	Aix-en-Provence	17
6	(France) Georges Lech	Lens	16
6	(France) André Guy	Lyon	16
6	(Luxembourg) Johny Leonard	Metz	16
9	(France) Didier Couécou	Bordeaux	15
9	(Socialist Federal Republic of Yugoslavia) Silvester Takač	Rennes	15
9	(France) Guy Lassalette	Sochaux	15

== Attendances ==
#	Club	Average
1	Saint-Étienne	14,537
2	Nantes	13,101
3	Metz	11,465
4	Marseille	11,438
5	Nice	9,710
6	Stade rennais	9,525
7	Girondins	9,326
8	Red Star	8,199
9	Olympique lyonnais	8,127
10	LOSC	7,339
11	Rouen	7,283
12	Strasbourg	7,250
13	Lens	6,893
14	Sochaux	6,704
15	Angers	5,875
16	Aix-en-Provence	3,855
17	Monaco	2,682
18	Ajaccio	2,596
