= Georges Bereta =

French footballer (1946–2023)

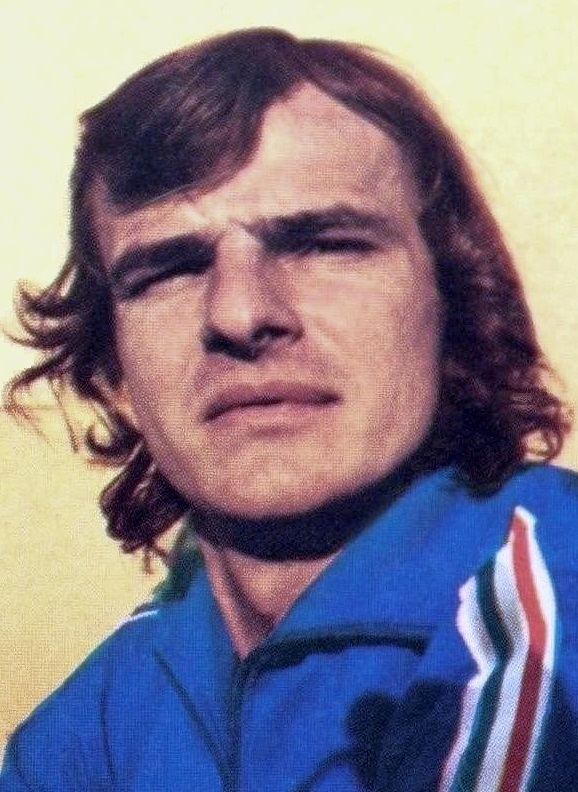
- Bereta in 1974

Personal information
- Date of birth: 15 May 1946
- Place of birth: Saint-Étienne, Loire, France
- Date of death: 4 July 2023 (aged 77)
- Place of death: L'Étrat, France
- Height: 1.66 m (5 ft 5 in)
- Position: Striker

Senior career*
Years	Team	Apps	(Gls)
1966–1974	Saint Étienne	281	(53)
1975–1978	Marseille	76	(5)
Total		357	(58)

International career
1967–1975	France	44	(4)
- * Club domestic league appearances and goals

Georges Bereta (15 May 1946 – 4 July 2023) was a French footballer who played as a striker. From 1966 to 1974 he played for Saint-Étienne before moving onto Marseille until he retired in 1978.

== Personal life and death ==
Bereta's parents were Polish.

He died on 4 July 2023, at the age of 77.

== Honours ==
Saint-Étienne

- Division 1: 1966–67, 1967–68, 1968–69, 1969–70, 1973–74, 1974–75
- Coupe de France: 1967–68, 1969–70, 1973–74

Marseille

- Coupe de France: 1975–76
