= Hervé Revelli =

French footballer (born 1946)

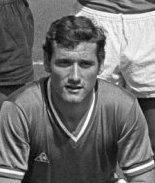
- Revelli in 1968

Personal information
- Date of birth: 5 May 1946 (age 80)
- Place of birth: Verdun, France
- Height: 1.75 m (5 ft 9 in)
- Position: Striker

Youth career
- Gardanne

Senior career*
Years	Team	Apps	(Gls)
1964–1971	Saint-Étienne	189	(126)
1971–1973	Nice	71	(41)
1973–1978	Saint-Étienne	129	(49)
1978–1980	Chênois	22	(10)
1980–1983	Châteauroux	77	(7)
1983–1985	Draguignan		

International career
1966–1975	France	30	(15)

Managerial career
- 1979–1980: Chênois (player-manager)
- 1980–1983: Châteauroux (player-manager)
- 1983–1984: Draguignan (player-manager)
- 1986–1987: CS Sfaxien
- 1987–1989: Château-Thierry
- 1989: Mauritius
- 1989–1993: Saint-Priest
- 1998: CA Bizertin
- 2003: MC Oran
- 2003–2004: MC Alger
- 2004: Benin
- 2005: ES Sétif
- 2007–2008: Toulouse Fontaines (director of sports)
- 2009–2011: US Feurs
- 2018: Lyon-Décines
- * Club domestic league appearances and goals

Hervé Revelli (born 5 May 1946) is a French former professional footballer who played as a forward.

== Career ==
Revelli scored 31 Ligue 1 goals during the calendar year of 1969. Fifty years later in 2019, Kylian Mbappé became the first French player to score at least 30 goals in a calendar year in Ligue 1 since Revelli's feat.

Revelli is the joint-top scorer in the Derby Rhône-Alpes between Saint-Étienne and Lyon with 14 goals along with former Lyon player Fleury Di Nallo. He finished his career in SC Draguignan, having already started a career as playing manager.

In addition to Switzerland and France, he managed in Tunisia and Algeria as well as the national teams of Mauritius and Benin.

== Personal life ==
He is the brother of former professional footballer, Patrick Revelli.

== Honours ==
Saint-Étienne

- Ligue 1: 1966–67, 1967–68, 1968–69, 1969–70, 1973–74, 1974–75, 1975–76
- Coupe de France: 1969–70, 1973–74, 1974–75, 1976–77

Individual

- French Player of the Year: 1969
