= AS Saint-Étienne =

French football club

- Full name: Association Sportive de Saint-Étienne Loire
- Nicknames: Sainté; Les Verts (The Greens); Les Stéphanois (The Stéphanois)
- Short name: A.S.S.E.
- Founded: 1919; 107 years ago (as A.S.C.); 1933; 93 years ago (as A.S.S.E.)
- Stadium: Stade Geoffroy-Guichard
- Capacity: 41,965
- Owner: Kilmer Sports Ventures
- President: Ivan Gazidis
- Head coach: Ian Cathro
- League: Ligue 2
- 2025–26: Ligue 2, 3rd of 18
- Website: asse.fr
Home colours	Away colours	Third colours

Association Sportive de Saint-Étienne Loire (French pronunciation: [sɛ̃t‿etjɛn lwaʁ]), abbreviated as A.S.S.E. (French pronunciation: [a.ɛs.ɛs.ø]) and commonly known as Saint-Étienne, is a French professional football club based in Saint-Étienne, Auvergne-Rhône-Alpes. The club was founded in 1933 and competes in Ligue 2, the second division of French football. Saint-Étienne's home ground is the Stade Geoffroy-Guichard.

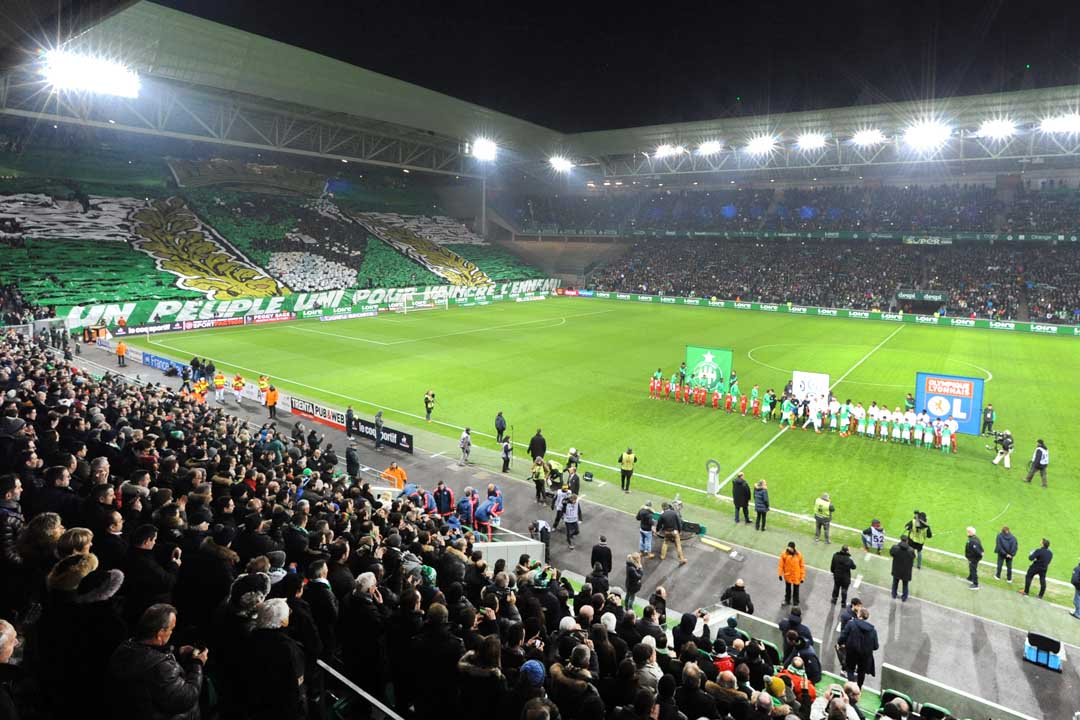
Saint-Étienne's home Stadium, the Stade Geoffroy-Guichard

Saint-Étienne have won ten Ligue 1 titles, six Coupe de France titles, a Coupe de la Ligue title and five Trophée des Champions. They have also won the Ligue 2 championship on three occasions. The club achieved most of its honours in the 1960s and 1970s under the leadership of managers Jean Snella, Albert Batteux and Robert Herbin. In 1976, the club reached the final of the European Cup.

Saint-Étienne is known as Les Verts meaning "the Greens" due to its home colours. They have a longstanding rivalry with nearby team Lyon, against whom they contest the Derby rhônalpin.

In 2009, the club added a female section.

== History ==
=== Founding, professionalism and early history (1919–1955) ===
AS Saint-Étienne was founded in 1919 by employees of the Saint-Étienne-based grocery store chain Groupe Casino under the name Amicale des Employés de la Société des Magasins Casino (ASC). The club adopted green as its primary color mainly due to it being the principal colour of Groupe Casino. In 1920, due to the French Football Federation (FFF) prohibiting the use of trademarks in sports club, the club dropped "Casino" from its name and changed its name to simply Amical Sporting Club to retain the ASC acronym. In 1927, Pierre Guichard took over as president of the club and, after merging with local club Stade Forézien Universitaire, changed its name to Association Sportive Stéphanoise.

In July 1930, the National Council of the FFF voted 128–20 in support of professionalism in French football. In 1933, AS Stéphanoise turned professional and changed its name to its current version. The club was inserted into the second division and became inaugural members of the league after finishing runner-up in the South Group. Saint-Étienne remained in Division 2 for four more seasons before earning promotion to Division 1 for the 1938–39 season under the leadership of the Englishman Teddy Duckworth. However, the team's debut appearance in the first division was short-lived due to the onset of World War II. Saint-Étienne returned to the first division after the war under the Austrian-born Frenchman Ignace Tax and surprised many by finishing runner-up to Lille in the first season after the war. The club failed to improve upon that finish in following seasons under Tax and, ahead of the 1950–51 season, Tax was let go and replaced by former Saint-Étienne player Jean Snella.

=== Ten league titles (1956–1981) ===
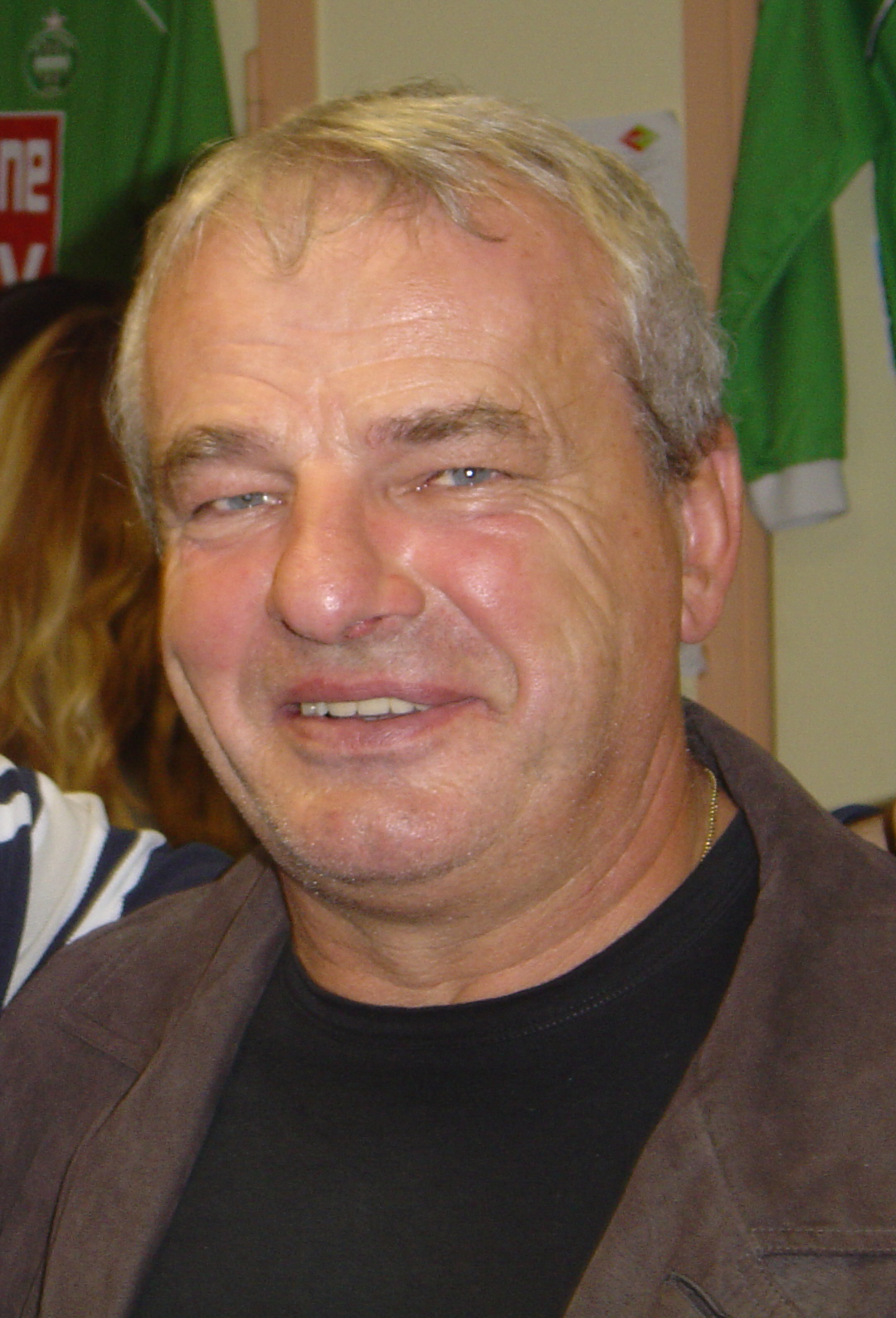
Georges Bereta won six league titles while playing for Saint-Étienne.

Under Jean Snella, Saint-Étienne achieved its first honour after winning the Coupe Charles Drago in 1955. Two seasons later, the club won its first domestic league title. Led by goalkeeper Claude Abbes, defender Robert Herbin, as well as midfielders René Ferrier and Kees Rijvers and striker Georges Peyroche, Saint-Étienne won the league by four points over Lens. In 1958, Saint-Étienne won the Coupe Drago for the second time. After the following season, in which the club finished sixth, Snella departed the club. He was replaced by René Vernier. In the team's first season under Vernier, Saint-Étienne finished 12th, the club's worst finish since finishing 11th eight seasons ago. In the following season, François Wicart joined the coaching staff. In 1961, Roger Rocher became president of the club and quickly became one of the club's chief investors. After two seasons under Wicart, Saint-Étienne were relegated after finishing 17th in the 1961–62 season. However, Wicart did lead the club to its first Coupe de France title in 1962, alongside co-manager Henri Guérin with the team defeating Nancy 1–0 in the final. He also led the club back to Division 1 after one season in the second division, but after the season, Wicart was replaced by Snella, who returned as manager after a successful stint in Switzerland with Servette.

In Snella's first season back, Saint-Étienne won its second league title and, three seasons later, captured its third. Snella's third and final title with the club coincided with the arrival of Georges Bereta, Bernard Bosquier, Gérard Farison and Hervé Revelli to the team. After the season, Snella returned to Servette and former Reims manager Albert Batteux replaced him. In Batteux's first season in 1967–68, Saint-Étienne captured the double after winning the league and the Coupe de France. In the next season, Batteux won the league and, in the ensuing season, won the double again. The club's fast rise into French football led to a high-level of confidence from the club's ownership and supporters and, following two seasons without a trophy, Batteux was let go and replaced by former Saint-Étienne player Robert Herbin.

In Herbin's first season in charge, Saint-Étienne finished fourth in the league and reached the semi-finals of the Coupe de France. In the next two seasons, the club won the double, its seventh and eighth career league title and its third and fourth Coupe de France title. In 1976, Saint-Étienne became the first French club since Reims in 1959 to reach the final of the European Cup. In the match, played at Hampden Park in Scotland, Saint-Étienne faced German club Bayern Munich, who were the reigning champions and arguably the world's best team at the time. The match was hotly contested with Saint-Étienne failing to score after numerous chances by Jacques Santini, Dominique Bathenay and Osvaldo Piazza, among others. A single goal by Franz Roth eventually decided the outcome and Saint-Étienne supporters departed Scotland in tears, however, not without nicknaming the goalposts "les poteaux carrés" ("the square posts"). Saint-Étienne did earn a consolation prize by winning the league to cap off a successful season and, in the following season, the team won the Coupe de France for the sixth time in a 2–1 victory over Reims. In 1981, Saint-Étienne, captained by Michel Platini, won its final league title to date after winning the league for the tenth time. After two more seasons in charge, Herbin departed the club for archrivals Lyon.

=== Promotions and relegations (1982–2012) ===
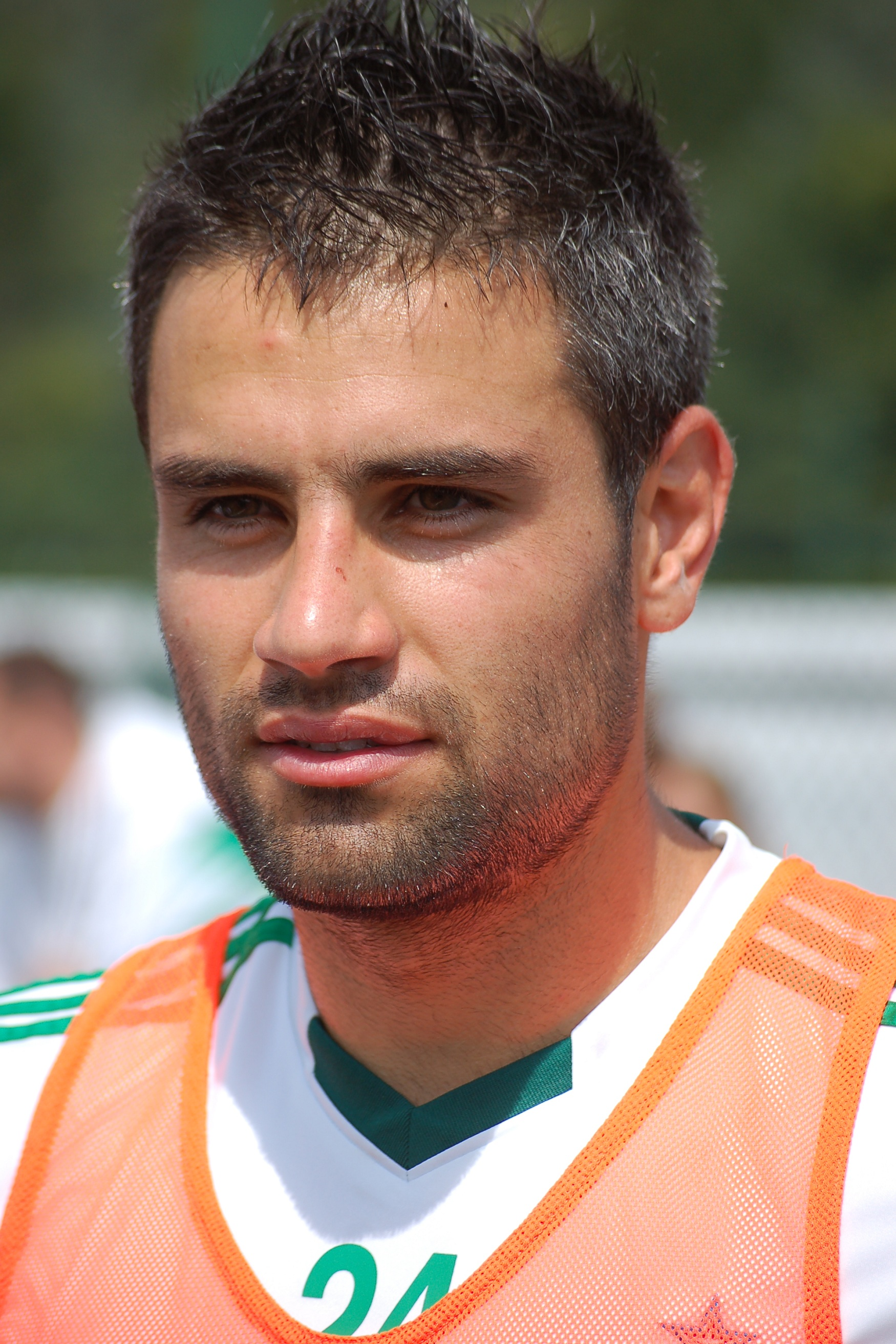
Loïc Perrin spent his entire career at Saint-Étienne, his hometown club.

In 1982, a financial scandal involving a controversial slush fund led to the departure and eventual jailing of long-time president Roger Rocher. Saint-Étienne subsequently suffered a free-fall with the club suffering relegation in the 1983–84 season. The club returned to Division 1 in 1986 under the leadership of goalkeeper Jean Castaneda who had remained with the club, despite its financial state. Saint-Étienne kept its place in the first division for nearly a decade with the club reaching the semi-finals of the Coupe de France in 1990 and 1993 during the stint. In 1996, Saint-Étienne was relegated to the second division and returned to Division 1 in 1999. In the 2000–01 season, the club was supervised by five different managers and had to deal with a scandal that involved two players (Brazilian Alex Dias and Ukrainian goalkeeper Maksym Levytsky) who utilised fake Portuguese and Greek passports. Both players were suspended for four months and, at the end of a judicial inquiry, which linked some of the club's management staff to the passport forgeries, Saint-Étienne was docked seven league points and relegated.

Saint-Étienne played three seasons in Division 2 and returned to the first division, now called Ligue 1, for the 2004–05 season. They came fifth in the 2007–08 season, which resulted in the club qualifying for the UEFA Cup for the first time since 1982. Saint-Étienne was influenced by several youngsters within the team such as Bafétimbi Gomis, Loïc Perrin, Blaise Matuidi and Dimitri Payet. The club followed up its fifth-place finish by finishing 17th in the next two seasons.

=== Recent history (2013–present) ===
Having won the Coupe de la Ligue in April 2013, their first major domestic trophy for more than 30 years, Saint-Étienne qualified for the third preliminary round of the 2013–14 UEFA Europa League campaign. Following crowd trouble towards the end of the 2012–13 season, Saint-Étienne were handed a one-match stadium ban which would have forced the team to open their campaign behind closed doors. However, on 23 July 2013, this ban was lifted. On 30 November 2014, Saint-Étienne defeated fierce rivals Lyon 3–0 at the Stade Geoffroy-Guichard for the first time since 1994.

The 2017–18 Ligue 1 season started badly for Saint-Étienne and culminated in a 5–0 derby loss to Lyon, after which Óscar García Junyent was dismissed as manager and replaced by former player Julien Sablé. Sable was replaced in December by Jean-Louis Gasset because he did not hold the required qualifications to coach in Ligue 1, and the club were fined €25,000 for every game played with Sable in charge. Under Gasset, Saint-Étienne went 13 games unbeaten and finished 7th in the table at the end of the season.

In the 2018–19 season, Saint-Étienne came fourth, the best finish since their promotion, after which Gasset elected to leave the club. The following year they were 17th when the season was ended by the coronavirus pandemic. They also reached the Coupe de France final in this season, which they lost 1–0 to Paris Saint-Germain.

In the 2020–21 season, Saint-Étienne started poorly and hovered above the relegation zone for most of the season before winning five of their last ten matches to finish 11th on the table. During that season, the club's board of directors announced, in a public letter on 14 April 2021, that the club was up for sale.

During the beginning of the 2021–22 season, the team suffered a catastrophic record; the culmination of 12 consecutive games without a win in Ligue 1. On 5 December 2021, after a 5–0 defeat against Rennes, manager Claude Puel was relieved from his duties. Julien Sablé, the assistant coach, took over as caretaker manager, before Pascal Dupraz was appointed as the new manager on 15 December 2021. The team eventually finished 18th in the season, and were relegated to the Ligue 2 after losing in a penalty shootout to Auxerre in the relegation play-offs. Saint-Étienne was sanctioned with a deduction of three points and four matches behind closed doors after serious incidents that occurred on the field after the game. The incidents left over 30 people injured. With a total of 18 points at the half of the 2022–23 season, Saint-Étienne was in the relegation zone ranked 18th in the table; however, they managed to finish the campaign in 8th place. The 2022–23 season was also the first with their new club badge. In the 2023–24 Ligue 2 season, Saint-Étienne finished inside the playoff places and would eventually reach the relegation/promotion playoff against Metz. Saint-Étienne would win the two legged playoff 4–3 on aggregate to earn promotion back to Ligue 1, but were ultimately relegated at the end of the 2024–25 season.

== Players ==
=== Current squad ===
As of 8 September 2026

Note: Flags indicate national team as defined under FIFA eligibility rules; some limited exceptions apply. Players may hold more than one non-FIFA nationality.

No.	Pos.	Nation	Player
1	GK	SEN	Mamour Ndiaye
2	DF	SRB	Strahinja Stojković
5	MF	ISR	Mahmoud Jaber
6	DF	FRA	Maxime Bernauer
7	FW	MLT	Irvin Cardona
8	FW	AUT	Thierno Ballo
10	MF	DEN	Jakob Breum
11	DF	NZL	Ben Old
13	DF	POR	João Ferreira
14	MF	HUN	Áron Csongvai
15	DF	POR	Chico Lamba
16	MF	SLO	Tamar Svetlin
17	FW	ENG	Joshua Duffus

No.	Pos.	Nation	Player
18	DF	ALG	Sohaib Naïr
20	FW	GHA	Augustine Boakye
21	MF	FRA	Paul Eymard
22	FW	GEO	Zuriko Davitashvili
23	DF	COD	Kévin Pedro
26	DF	FRA	Julien Le Cardinal
30	GK	FRA	Gautier Larsonneur (captain)
31	MF	FRA	Nadir El Jamali
32	MF	MAR	Adam Baallal
33	FW	EST	Marten Paalberg
34	DF	SEN	Lassana Traoré
40	GK	FRA	Lucas Lavallée

=== Out on loan ===
Note: Flags indicate national team as defined under FIFA eligibility rules; some limited exceptions apply. Players may hold more than one non-FIFA nationality.

No.	Pos.	Nation	Player
—	DF	GHA	Ebenezer Annan (at Rapid București until 30 June 2027)
—	DF	FRA	Axel Dodote (at Pau until 30 June 2027)
—	MF	FRA	Pierre Ekwah (at Auxerre until 30 June 2027)
—	MF	FRA	Luan Gadegbeku (at Pau until 30 June 2027)
—	MF	SRB	Igor Miladinović (at Partizan until 30 June 2027)

No.	Pos.	Nation	Player
—	MF	MAR	Aïmen Moueffek (at Cádiz until 30 June 2027)
—	MF	FRA	Jebryl Sahraoui (at Aubagne Air Bel until 30 June 2027)
—	FW	FRA	Djylian N'Guessan (at Brest until 31 Dec 2026)
—	FW	BEL	Lucas Stassin (at Sevilla until 30 June 2027)

=== Retired numbers ===
Note: Flags indicate national team as defined under FIFA eligibility rules; some limited exceptions apply. Players may hold more than one non-FIFA nationality.

No.	Pos.	Nation	Player
24	DF	FRA	Loïc Perrin

== Records and statistics ==
Most appearances

#	Name	Matches
1	(France) René Domingo	518
2	(France) Robert Herbin	489
3	(France) Loïc Perrin	470
4	(France) Christian Lopez	453
5	(France) Gérard Farison	412
6	(France) Hervé Revelli	405
7	(France) Jean-Michel Larqué	403
8	(France) Gérard Janvion	392
9	(France) Stéphane Ruffier	383
10	(France) Jean Castaneda	378

Top scorers

#	Name	Goals
1	(France) Hervé Revelli	304
2	(Algeria) Rachid Mekhloufi	150
3	(Mali) Salif Keïta	143
4	(Austria) Ignace Tax	119
5	(France) Antoine Rodriguez	109
6	(Cameroon) Eugène N'Jo Léa	101
7	(France) Robert Herbin	99
8	(France) Jean-Michel Larqué	99
9	(Kingdom of Yugoslavia) (France) Ivan Bek	93
10	(France) Michel Platini	82

=== European record ===
As of 2019

Competition	Played	Won	Drawn	Lost	Goals For	Goals Against
UEFA Champions League	41	19	7	15	50	44
UEFA Europa League	68	28	22	18	111	73
UEFA Cup Winners' Cup	6	1	3	5	2	7
Total	115	51	32	38	163	124

=== UEFA club coefficient ranking ===
As of 15 April 2021

Rank	Team	Points
116	(Cyprus) Apollon Limassol	13.500
117	(France) Nice	13.000
118	(France) Saint-Étienne	13.000
119	(Switzerland) Zürich	12.000
120	(Hungary) Fehérvár	11.500

== Honours ==
=== Domestic ===
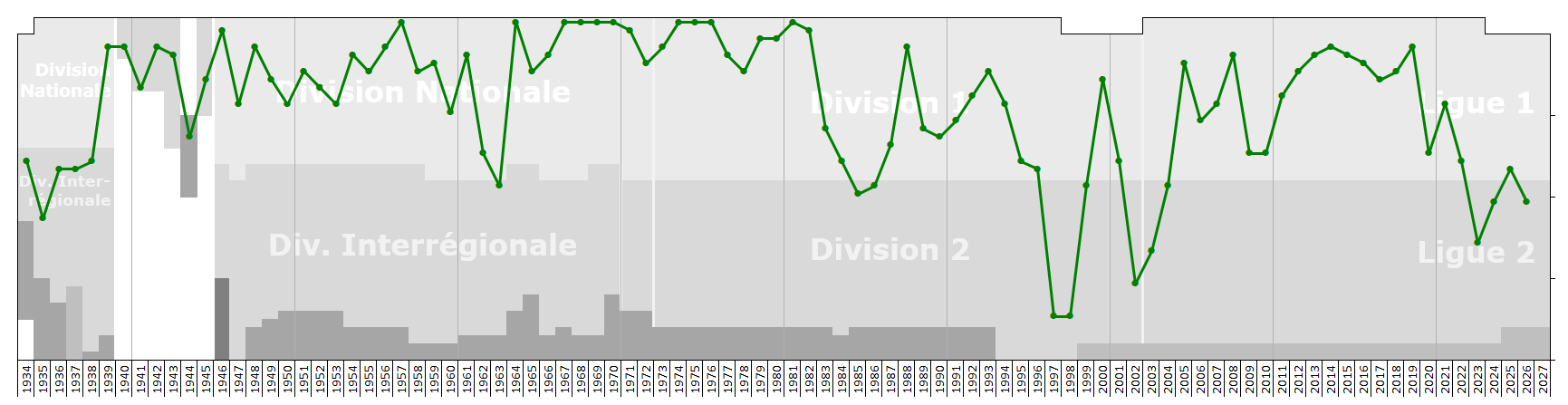
Historical league performance chart of AS Saint-Étienne

- Ligue 1
  - Champions (10): 1956–57, 1963–64, 1966–67, 1967–68, 1968–69, 1969–70, 1973–74, 1974–75, 1975–76, 1980–81
  - Runners-up: 1945–46, 1971–72, 1981–82
- Ligue 2
  - Winners (3): 1962–63, 1998–99, 2003–04
- Coupe de France
  - Winners (6): 1961–62, 1967–68, 1969–70, 1973–74, 1974–75, 1976–77
- Coupe de la Ligue
  - Winners: 2012–13
- Trophée des Champions
  - Winners (5): 1957, 1962, 1967, 1968, 1969
- Coupe Charles Drago
  - Winners: 1955, 1958

=== European ===
- European Cup/Champions League
  - Runners-up (1): 1975–76

=== Youth ===
- Coupe Gambardella
  - Winners: 1962–63, 1969–70, 1987–88, 2018–19

== Management and staff ==
=== Club officials ===
Senior club staff

- President: Ivan Gazidis
- Executive Vice-President: Huss Fahmy
- General manager: Jaeson Rosenfeld

Coaching and medical staff

- Head coach: Ian Cathro
- Assistant coaches: Bryant Lazaro, Eliaquim Mangala, David Le Moël
- Goalkeeper coach: Jean-Francois Bedenik
- Director of performance: Donough Holohan
- Fitness coaches: Calum Daley, Paolo Gaudino, Philippe Djo Petitjean, Ben Smalley
- Doctor: Tarak Bouzaabia
- Physiotherapists: Victor Coste, Raphaël Delpech, Pierre-Luc Guichard, Romain Maillé, Ruben Pacheco, Antoine Preynat
- Kit Manager: Frédéric Emile

Academy coaching staff

- Director of Youth Academy: Bernard David
- Head of Youth Scouting: Gerard Fernandez
- Director of Youth Department: Laurent Huard

=== Coaching history ===
Dates	Name
1933	Albert Locke
1934	Harold Rivers
1934–1935	Teddy Duckworth
1936–1937	Zoltán Vágó
1936–1940	Teddy Duckworth
1940–1943	Émile Cabannes
1943–1950	Ignace Tax
1950–1959	Jean Snella
1959–1960	René Vernier
1960–1961	François Wicart
1961–1962	Henri Guérin
1962–1963	François Wicart
1963–1967	Jean Snella
1 July 1967 – 30 June 1972	Albert Batteux
1 July 1972 – 1 February 1983	Robert Herbin
1983	Guy Briet
1983–1984	Jean Djorkaeff
1984	Robert Philippe
1984–1987	Henryk Kasperczak
1 July 1987 – 30 June 1990	Robert Herbin
1 July 1989 – 30 June 1992	Christian Sarramagna
1 July 1992 – 30 June 1994	Jacques Santini
1994–1996	Élie Baup
1996	Maxime Bossis
1996 – 30 June 1996	Dominique Bathenay
1996–1997	Pierre Mankowski

Dates	Name
1 July 1997 – 30 June 1998	Pierre Repellini
1 July 1998 – 30 September 2000	Robert Nouzaret
2000	Gérard Soler
1 October 2000 – 21 December 2000	John Toshack
5 January 2001 – 30 June 2001	Rudi Garcia; Jean-Guy Wallemme
1 July 2001 – 9 October 2001	Alain Michel
9 October 2001 – 30 June 2004	Frédéric Antonetti
7 June 2004 – 30 June 2006	Élie Baup
1 July 2006 – 30 June 2007	Ivan Hašek
1 July 2007 – 10 November 2008	Laurent Roussey
11 November 2008 – 15 December 2009	Alain Perrin
15 December 2009 – 20 May 2017	Christophe Galtier
15 June 2017 – 15 November 2017	Óscar García
15 November 2017 – 20 December 2017	Julien Sablé
20 December 2017 – 30 June 2019	Jean-Louis Gasset
6 June 2019 – 4 October 2019	Ghislain Printant
4 October 2019 – 5 December 2021	Claude Puel
14 December 2021 – 30 June 2022	Pascal Dupraz
3 June 2022 – 6 December 2023	Laurent Batlles
12 December 2023 – 14 December 2024	Olivier Dall'Oglio
20 December 2024 – 31 January 2026	Eirik Horneland
1 February 2026 – 9 June 2026	Philippe Montanier
8 June 2026 – Now	Ian Cathro
