= List of Ligue 1 top scorers =

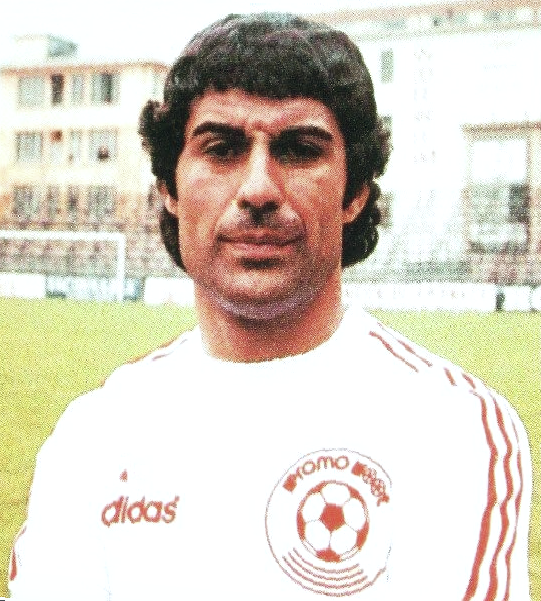
Delio Onnis has scored the most goals in Ligue 1.

The following is the list of players who scored over 100 goals in French Ligue 1, during its history starting from the 1932–33 season. Roger Courtois was the first player to reach both 100 and 200 goals in Ligue 1. Hervé Revelli became the all-time top scorer in 1975–76 before Delio Onnis overtook him in 1980–81 and has held the honour since.

The most recent player to score their hundredth goal in Ligue 1 was Florian Thauvin on 29 August 2026. Of the active players still in Ligue 1, Ludovic Ajorque and Amine Gouiri are the closest to joining the list with 68 and 67 goals, respectively.

== All-time top scorers ==
Key

- **Bold** shows players still playing in Ligue 1.
- Italics show players still playing professional football in other leagues.

As of matches played 30 August 2026

Rank	Player	Goals	Apps	Ratio	First	Last	Club(s) (goals/apps)
1	(Argentina) Delio Onnis	299	449	0.67	1971	1986	Reims (39/65), Monaco (157/200), Tours (64/110), Toulon (39/74)
2	(France) Bernard Lacombe	255	497	0.51	1969	1987	Lyon (123/222), Saint-Étienne (14/32), Bordeaux (118/243)
3	(France) Hervé Revelli	216	389	0.56	1965	1978	Saint-Étienne (175/318), Nice (41/71)
4	(France) Roger Courtois	210	288	0.73	1933	1956	Sochaux (209/285), Troyes (1/3)
5	(France) Thadée Cisowski	206	286	0.72	1947	1961	Metz (45/86), Racing (152/172), Valenciennes (9/28)
6	(France) Roger Piantoni	203	394	0.52	1950	1966	Nancy (91/217), Reims (106/161), Nice (6/16)
7	(France) Kylian Mbappé	191	246	0.78	2015	2024	Monaco (16/41), Paris Saint-Germain (175/205)
8	(France) Joseph Ujlaki	190	438	0.43	1947	1964	Stade Français (3/7), Sète (15/44), Nîmes (38/92), Nice (59/133), Racing (75/162)
9	(France) Fleury Di Nallo	187	425	0.44	1960	1975	Lyon (182/413), Red Star (5/12)
10	(Argentina) Carlos Bianchi	179	220	0.81	1973	1980	Reims (107/124), Paris Saint-Germain (64/74), Strasbourg (8/22)
10	(Sweden) Gunnar Andersson	179	234	0.76	1950	1960	Marseille (169/220), Bordeaux (10/14)
12	(Morocco) Hassan Akesbi	173	293	0.59	1955	1964	Nîmes (119/204), Reims (48/78), Monaco (6/11)
13	(France) Jean Baratte	169	284	0.6	1945	1955	Lille (167/268), Roubaix (2/16)
14	(France) Just Fontaine	164	200	0.82	1953	1962	Nice (42/69), Reims (122/131)
15	(France) Alain Giresse	163	587	0.28	1970	1988	Bordeaux (158/520), Marseille (5/67)
16	(France) Alexandre Lacazette	161	297	0.54	2010	2025	Lyon
16	(France) Wissam Ben Yedder	161	320	0.5	2010	2024	Toulouse (63/156), Monaco (98/164)
18	(France) André Guy	159	271	0.59	1959	1971	Sochaux (3/6), Saint-Étienne (45/65), Lille (42/76), Lyon (64/110), Rennes (5/14)
19	(France) Désiré Koranyi	157	252	0.62	1935	1950	Sète
20	(France) Jean-Pierre Papin	156	270	0.58	1986	1998	Marseille (134/215), Bordeaux (22/55)
21	(France) Jacky Vergnes	153	327	0.47	1968	1982	Red Star (11/41), Nîmes (72/117), Bastia (20/46), Reims (11/26), Laval (19/36), Strasbourg (12/37), Bordeaux (8/20), Montpellier (0/4)
22	(Socialist Federal Republic of Yugoslavia) Josip Skoblar	151	174	0.87	1966	1974	Marseille
23	(France) Lucien Cossou	149	285	0.52	1956	1968	Lyon (35/91), Monaco (97/161), Aix (17/33)
24	(France) Dominique Rocheteau	145	417	0.35	1972	1989	Saint-Étienne (51/153), Paris Saint-Germain (83/204), Toulouse (11/60)
25	(Algeria) Rachid Mekhloufi	143	325	0.44	1954	1970	Saint-Étienne (123/274), Bastia (20/67)
26	(Portugal) Pauleta	141	266	0.53	2000	2008	Bordeaux (65/98), Paris Saint-Germain (76/168)
27	(France) Yvon Douis	140	354	0.4	1953	1967	Lille (50/141), Le Havre (28/71), Monaco (62/167)
28	(France) Michel Platini	139	254	0.55	1973	1982	Nancy (81/150), Saint-Étienne (58/104)
28	(France) Stéphane Bruey	139	423	0.33	1950	1966	Racing (11/44), Monaco (25/81), Angers (93/254), Lyon (10/44)
30	(Uruguay) Edinson Cavani	138	200	0.69	2013	2020	Paris Saint-Germain
30	(Brazil) Sonny Anderson	138	221	0.62	1993	2003	Marseille (16/20), Monaco (51/91), Lyon (71/110)
32	(Mali) Salif Keïta	135	168	0.8	1967	1973	Saint-Étienne (125/150), Marseille (10/18)
33	(France) Hector De Bourgoing	133	258	0.52	1959	1969	Nice (65/114), Bordeaux (68/137)
34	(France) Jacques Foix	132	361	0.37	1951	1964	Racing (24/52), Saint-Étienne (54/129), Nice (50/162), Toulouse (4/18)
34	(France) Yannick Stopyra	132	448	0.29	1977	1992	Sochaux (57/176), Rennes (10/37), Toulouse (46/148), Bordeaux (8/34), Cannes (9/37), Metz (2/24)
36	(France) Henri Hiltl	131	252	0.52	1934	1948	Excelsior (82/154), Roubaix (49/98)
37	(France) Bernard Zénier	130	466	0.28	1974	1991	Metz (55/232), Nancy (53/144), Bordeaux (4/25), Marseille (18/65)
38	(Republic of the Congo) François M'Pelé	129	350	0.37	1969	1981	Ajaccio (57/121), Paris Saint-Germain (60/167), Lens (12/62)
38	(France) Gérard Soler	129	428	0.3	1972	1987	Sochaux (67/162), Monaco (9/28), Bordeaux (16/91), Toulouse (19/58), Strasbourg (6/32), Bastia (6/23), Lille (5/13), Rennes (1/21)
40	(Argentina) Alberto Muro	128	269	0.48	1951	1962	Sochaux (57/123), Nice (43/85), Nancy (28/61)
41	(France) Jean Grumellon	126	203	0.62	1947	1954	Rennes (107/157), Nice (5/14), Le Havre (14/33)
41	(France) Lilian Laslandes	126	407	0.31	1992	2008	Auxerre (47/125), Bordeaux (56/179), Bastia (8/30), Nice (15/73)
43	(Cameroon) Joseph Yegba Maya	124	238	0.52	1962	1975	Marseille (79/133), Valenciennes (33/74), Strasbourg (12/31)
44	(France) Bafétimbi Gomis	122	340	0.36	2004	2017	Saint-Étienne (38/131), Lyon (64/178), Marseille (20/32)
45	(France) Henri Baillot	121	241	0.5	1945	1954	Metz (80/158), Bordeaux (35/67), Strasbourg (6/16)
45	(France) Ernest Schultz	121	275	0.44	1954	1963	Lyon (35/88), Toulouse (86/187)
45	(France) René Gardien	121	340	0.36	1947	1959	Sochaux
48	(France) André Simonyi	120	186	0.65	1933	1953	Olympique Lillois (37/51), Sochaux (8/15), Red Star (47/72), Rennes (13/21), Stade Français (10/16), Roubaix (5/11)
48	(France) François Félix	120	341	0.35	1968	1981	Lyon (5/31), Bastia (63/160), Paris (19/36), Nîmes (10/44), Angers (22/65), Auxerre (1/5)
48	(France) Serge Chiesa	120	475	0.25	1969	1983	Lyon
51	(France) Jean Vincent	119	421	0.28	1950	1964	Lille (51/154), Reims (68/267)
52	(Germany) Oskar Rohr	118	136	0.87	1934	1939	Strasbourg
53	(France) Nestor Combin	117	221	0.53	1959	1975	Lyon (68/131), Metz (34/59), Red Star (15/31)
53	(France) Didier Couécou	117	308	0.38	1963	1976	Bordeaux (75/188), Marseille (28/79), Nantes (14/41)
53	(France) Bernard Genghini	117	360	0.33	1976	1989	Sochaux (60/181), Saint-Étienne (8/36), Monaco (45/106), Marseille (3/36), Bordeaux (1/4)
53	(France) Georges Lech	117	379	0.31	1962	1976	Lens (71/187), Sochaux (39/118), Reims (7/74)
53	(France) Dominique Rustichelli	117	459	0.25	1952	1970	Marseille (33/138), Sedan (12/50), Strasbourg (3/17), Reims (5/11), Nice (28/114), Stade Français (15/59), Lille (0/7), Rouen (21/63)
58	(France) Ginès Liron	116	239	0.49	1954	1965	Nîmes (21/37), Sochaux (29/71), Valenciennes (18/38), Saint-Étienne (48/93)
59	(France) Pierre Sinibaldi	115	189	0.61	1945	1954	Reims (115/188), Lyon (0/1)
60	(Sweden) Zlatan Ibrahimović	113	122	0.93	2012	2016	Paris Saint-Germain
60	(France) Charly Loubet	113	360	0.31	1962	1975	Stade Français (5/22), Nice (77/272), Marseille (31/66)
60	(France) Maryan Wisniewski	113	415	0.27	1953	1969	Lens (93/277), Saint-Étienne (12/48), Sochaux (8/90)
63	(France) Éric Pécout	112	277	0.4	1974	1986	Nantes (73/156), Monaco (17/38), Metz (8/29), Strasbourg (14/54)
63	(France) André Strappe	112	341	0.33	1948	1961	Lille (99/275), Le Havre (13/66)
65	(France) Bernard Blanchet	111	357	0.31	1963	1974	Nantes
66	(France) Claude Papi	110	392	0.28	1968	1982	Bastia
66	(France) Albert Emon	110	410	0.27	1972	1988	Marseille (37/133), Reims (4/6), Monaco (26/78), Lyon (17/60), Toulon (21/103), Cannes (5/30)
68	(France) Henri Skiba	109	294	0.37	1950	1963	Nancy (0/10), Monaco (18/47), Strasbourg (19/64), Nîmes (47/104), Sochaux (3/6), Stade Français (22/63)
69	(France) Pierre Flamion	106	285	0.37	1945	1960	Reims (65/152), Marseille (11/29), Lyon (5/32), Troyes (24/62), Limoges (1/10)
69	(France) Albert Gemmrich	106	308	0.34	1973	1986	Strasbourg (71/193), Bordeaux (35/94), Lille (0/17), Nice (0/4)
69	(France) Léon Deladerrière	106	379	0.28	1947	1963	Nancy (96/321), Toulouse (10/58)
69	(France) Michel Stievenard	106	405	0.26	1954	1968	Lens (43/170), Angers (63/235)
73	(France) Édouard Kargu	105	208	0.5	1949	1956	Bordeaux
73	(France) Daniel Xuereb	105	442	0.24	1977	1993	Lyon (21/95), Lens (39/164), Paris Saint-Germain (29/80), Montpellier (21/65), Marseille (3/18), Toulon (1/20)
75	(France) Bernard Rahis	104	241	0.43	1954	1963	Nîmes
75	(France) Alain Caveglia	104	313	0.33	1990	2000	Sochaux (25/129), Le Havre (31/72), Lyon (47/102), Nantes (1/10)
77	(France) Robert Pintenat	103	298	0.35	1969	1983	Rouen (2/12), Red Star (17/64), Nîmes (7/41), Sochaux (62/129), Nancy (7/28), Toulouse (8/24)
77	(Morocco) Abdelkrim Merry	103	337	0.31	1974	1989	Bastia (23/93), Lille (12/35), Metz (23/36), Strasbourg (3/24), Tours (6/25), Le Havre (17/34), Saint-Étienne (9/30), Racing (10/50)
77	(France) Dimitri Payet	103	492	0.21	2005	2023	Nantes (5/33), Saint-Étienne (19/129), Lille (18/71), Marseille (61/259)
77	(France) François Brisson	103	505	0.2	1975	1993	Paris Saint-Germain (6/81), Laval (22/96), Lens (40/143), Strasbourg (10/38), Marseille (1/31), Lyon (7/28), Lille (17/88)
81	(France) Philippe Piat	102	240	0.43	1965	1972	Strasbourg (48/134), Monaco (16/32), Sochaux (38/74)
81	(France) Marc Berdoll	102	251	0.41	1970	1981	Angers (62/159), Marseille (40/92)
81	(France) André-Pierre Gignac	102	290	0.35	2006	2015	Lorient (11/50), Toulouse (35/100), Marseille (59/155)
81	(Algeria) Mustapha Dahleb	102	297	0.34	1969	1984	Sedan (17/29), Paris Saint-Germain (85/268)
81	(France) Philippe Vercruysse	102	458	0.22	1980	1997	Lens (46/210), Bordeaux (17/64), Marseille (21/99), Nîmes (14/59), Metz (4/26)
81	(France) Jimmy Briand	102	483	0.21	2003	2022	Rennes (33/169), Lyon (22/110), Guingamp (30/106), Bordeaux (17/98)
87	(Socialist Federal Republic of Yugoslavia) Vahid Halilhodžić	101	181	0.56	1981	1987	Nantes (93/163), Paris Saint-Germain (8/18)
87	(France) Kevin Gameiro	101	305	0.33	2005	2024	Strasbourg (32/138), Lorient (50/108), Paris Saint-Germain (19/59)
87	(Luxembourg) Victor Nurenberg	101	307	0.33	1952	1963	Nice (89/252), Sochaux (7/35), Lyon (5/20)
87	(France) Patrick Revelli	101	362	0.28	1969	1982	Saint-Étienne (74/226), Sochaux (27/136)
91	(France) Philippe Gondet	100	212	0.47	1963	1972	Nantes (98/194), Red Star (2/18)
91	(Senegal) Mamadou Niang	100	258	0.39	2000	2010	Troyes (8/47), Strasbourg (21/56), Marseille (71/155)
91	(France) **Florian Thauvin**	100	294	0.34	2012	2026	Bastia (10/32), Marseille (76/227), **Lens** (14/35)

== Top scorers by season ==
Season	Player(s)	Nationality	Club(s)	Goals	Apps	Rate
1932–33	Walter Kaiser	Germany	Rennes	15		
1932–33	Robert Mercier	France	Club Français	15	16	0.94
1933–34	István Lukács	Hungary	Sète ♦	28		
1934–35	André Abegglen	Switzerland	Sochaux ♦	30	28	1.07
1935–36	Roger Courtois	France	Sochaux	34	30	1.13
1936–37	Oskar Rohr	Germany	Strasbourg	30	29	1.03
1937–38	Jean Nicolas	France	Rouen	26	26	1
1938–39	Roger Courtois (2)	France	Sochaux	27	27	1
1938–39	Désiré Koranyi	France	Sète ♦	27	29	0.93
Championship not played 1939–1945 due to World War II
1945–46	René Bihel	France	Lille ♦	28	25	1.12
1946–47	Pierre Sinibaldi	France	Reims	33	37	0.89
1947–48	Jean Baratte	France	Lille	31		
1948–49	Jean Baratte (2)	France	Lille	26		
1948–49	Josef Humpál	Czechoslovakia	Sochaux	26		
1949–50	Jean Grumellon	France	Rennes	25		
1950–51	Roger Piantoni	France	Nancy	27		
1950–51	Jean Courteaux	France	Nice	27		
1951–52	Gunnar Andersson	Sweden	Marseille	31		
1952–53	Gunnar Andersson (2)	Sweden	Marseille	35		
1953–54	Édouard Kargu	France	Bordeaux	27		
1954–55	René Bliard	France	Reims ♦	30		
1955–56	Thadée Cisowski	France	RC Paris	31		
1956–57	Thadée Cisowski (2)	France	RC Paris	33		
1957–58	Just Fontaine	France	Reims ♦	34	26	1.31
1958–59	Thadée Cisowski (3)	France	RC Paris	30		
1959–60	Just Fontaine (2)	France	Reims ♦	28		
1960–61	Roger Piantoni (2)	France	Reims	28		
1961–62	Sékou Touré	Ivory Coast	Montpellier	25		
1962–63	Serge Masnaghetti	France	Valenciennes	35		
1963–64	Ahmed Oudjani	Algeria	Lens	30	31	0.97
1964–65	Jacques Simon	France	Nantes ♦	24	32	0.75
1965–66	Philippe Gondet	France	Nantes ♦	36	37	0.97
1966–67	Hervé Revelli	France	Saint-Étienne ♦	31	34	0.91
1967–68	Étienne Sansonetti	France	Ajaccio	26	34	0.76
1968–69	André Guy	France	Lyon	25	30	0.83
1969–70	Hervé Revelli (2)	France	Saint-Étienne ♦	28	31	0.9
1970–71	Josip Skoblar	Yugoslavia	Marseille ♦	44	36	1.22
1971–72	Josip Skoblar (2)	Yugoslavia	Marseille ♦	30	31	0.97
1972–73	Josip Skoblar (3)	Yugoslavia	Marseille	26	31	0.84
1973–74	Carlos Bianchi	Argentina	Reims	30	33	0.91
1974–75	Delio Onnis	Argentina	Monaco	30	37	0.81
1975–76	Carlos Bianchi (2)	Argentina	Reims	34	38	0.89
1976–77	Carlos Bianchi (3)	Argentina	Reims	28	37	0.76
1977–78	Carlos Bianchi (4)	Argentina	Paris Saint-Germain	37	38	0.97
1978–79	Carlos Bianchi (5)	Argentina	Paris Saint-Germain	27	36	0.75
1979–80	Erwin Kostedde	West Germany	Laval	21	34	0.62
1979–80	Delio Onnis (2)	Argentina	Monaco	21	30	0.7
1980–81	Delio Onnis (3)	Argentina	Tours	24	38	0.63
1981–82	Delio Onnis (4)	Argentina	Tours	29	38	0.76
1982–83	Vahid Halilhodžić	Yugoslavia	Nantes ♦	27	36	0.75
1983–84	Patrice Garande	France	Auxerre	21	37	0.57
1983–84	Delio Onnis (5)	Argentina	Toulon	21	36	0.58
1984–85	Vahid Halilhodžić (2)	Yugoslavia	Nantes	28	34	0.82
1985–86	Jules Bocandé	Senegal	Metz	23	32	0.72
1986–87	Bernard Zénier	France	Metz	18	37	0.49
1987–88	Jean-Pierre Papin	France	Marseille	19	37	0.51
1988–89	Jean-Pierre Papin (2)	France	Marseille ♦	22	36	0.61
1989–90	Jean-Pierre Papin (3)	France	Marseille ♦	30	36	0.83
1990–91	Jean-Pierre Papin (4)	France	Marseille ♦	23	36	0.64
1991–92	Jean-Pierre Papin (5)	France	Marseille ♦	27	37	0.73
1992–93	Alen Bokšić	Croatia	Marseille ♦	23	37	0.62
1993–94	Roger Boli	France	Lens	20	35	0.57
1993–94	Youri Djorkaeff	France	Monaco	20	35	0.57
1993–94	Nicolas Ouédec	France	Nantes	20	38	0.53
1994–95	Patrice Loko	France	Nantes ♦	22	37	0.59
1995–96	Sonny Anderson	Brazil	Monaco	21	34	0.62
1996–97	Stéphane Guivarc'h	France	Rennes	21	36	0.58
1997–98	Stéphane Guivarc'h (2)	France	Auxerre	21	32	0.66
1998–99	Sylvain Wiltord	France	Bordeaux ♦	22	33	0.67
1999–2000	Sonny Anderson (2)	Brazil	Lyon	23	32	0.72
2000–01	Sonny Anderson (3)	Brazil	Lyon	22	29	0.76
2001–02	Djibril Cissé	France	Auxerre	22	29	0.76
2001–02	Pauleta	Portugal	Bordeaux	22	33	0.67
2002–03	Shabani Nonda	DR Congo	Monaco	26	35	0.74
2003–04	Djibril Cissé (2)	France	Auxerre	26	38	0.68
2004–05	Alexander Frei	Switzerland	Rennes	20	36	0.56
2005–06	Pauleta (2)	Portugal	Paris Saint-Germain	21	36	0.58
2006–07	Pauleta (3)	Portugal	Paris Saint-Germain	15	33	0.45
2007–08	Karim Benzema	France	Lyon ♦	20	36	0.56
2008–09	André-Pierre Gignac	France	Toulouse	24	38	0.63
2009–10	Mamadou Niang	Senegal	Marseille ♦	18	32	0.56
2010–11	Moussa Sow	Senegal	Lille ♦	25	36	0.69
2011–12	Olivier Giroud	France	Montpellier ♦	21	36	0.58
2011–12	Nenê	Brazil	Paris Saint-Germain	21	35	0.6
2012–13	Zlatan Ibrahimović	Sweden	Paris Saint-Germain ♦	30	34	0.88
2013–14	Zlatan Ibrahimović (2)	Sweden	Paris Saint-Germain ♦	26	33	0.79
2014–15	Alexandre Lacazette	France	Lyon	27	33	0.82
2015–16	Zlatan Ibrahimović (3)	Sweden	Paris Saint-Germain ♦	38	31	1.23
2016–17	Edinson Cavani	Uruguay	Paris Saint-Germain	35	36	0.97
2017–18	Edinson Cavani (2)	Uruguay	Paris Saint-Germain ♦	28	32	0.88
2018–19	Kylian Mbappé	France	Paris Saint-Germain ♦	33	29	1.14
2019–20	Wissam Ben Yedder	France	Monaco	18	26	0.69
2019–20	Kylian Mbappé (2)	France	Paris Saint-Germain ♦	18	20	0.9
2020–21	Kylian Mbappé (3)	France	Paris Saint-Germain	27	31	0.87
2021–22	Kylian Mbappé (4)	France	Paris Saint-Germain ♦	28	35	0.8
2022–23	Kylian Mbappé (5)	France	Paris Saint-Germain ♦	29	34	0.85
2023–24	Kylian Mbappé (6)	France	Paris Saint-Germain ♦	27	29	0.93
2024–25	Ousmane Dembélé	France	Paris Saint-Germain ♦	21	29	0.72
2024–25	Mason Greenwood	England	Marseille	21	34	0.62
2025–26	Esteban Lepaul	France	Rennes (Note: Lepaul scored one goal with Angers before being transferred to Rennes.)	21	34	0.62

=== Wins by player ===
Player	Wins	Seasons
(France) Kylian Mbappe	6	2018–19, 2019–20, 2020–21, 2021–22, 2022–23, 2023–24
(Argentina) Carlos Bianchi	5	1973–74, 1975–76, 1976–77, 1977–78, 1978–79
(Argentina) Delio Onnis	5	1974–75, 1979–80, 1980–81, 1981–82, 1983–84
(France) Jean-Pierre Papin	5	1987–88, 1988–89, 1989–90, 1990–91, 1991–92
(France) Thadée Cisowski	3	1955–56, 1956–57, 1958–59
(Socialist Federal Republic of Yugoslavia) Josip Skoblar	3	1970–71, 1972–72, 1972–73
(Brazil) Sonny Anderson	3	1995–96, 1999–2000, 2001–02
(Portugal) Pauleta	3	2001–02, 2005–06, 2006–07
(Sweden) Zlatan Ibrahimovic	3	2012–13, 2013–14, 2015–16
(France) Roger Courtois	2	1935–36, 1938–39
(France) Jean Baratte	2	1947–48, 1948–49
(France) Roger Piantoni	2	1950–51, 1960–61
(Sweden) Gunnar Andersson	2	1951–52, 1952–53
(France) Hervé Revelli	2	1966–67, 1969–70
(Socialist Federal Republic of Yugoslavia) Vahid Halilhodžić	2	1982–83, 1984–85
(France) Stéphane Guivarc'h	2	1996–97, 1997–98
(France) Djibril Cissé	2	2001–02, 2003–04
(Uruguay) Edinson Cavani	2	2016-17, 2017-18

=== Wins by club ===
Club	Players	Total
Paris Saint-Germain	7	17
Marseille	5	12
Reims	5	8
Monaco	5	6
Nantes	5	6
Rennes	5	5
Lyon	4	5
Auxerre	3	4
Lille	3	4
Sochaux	3	4

=== Wins by country ===
Country	Players	Total
France	39	56
Argentina	2	10
Sweden	2	5
Yugoslavia	1	5
Brazil	2	4
Germany	3	3
Senegal	3	3
Portugal	1	3
Switzerland	2	2
Uruguay	1	2
Algeria	1	1
Croatia	1	1
Czechoslovakia	1	1
DR Congo	1	1
Hungary	1	1
Ivory Coast	1	1
England	1	1

== See also ==
- Capocannoniere
- Premier League Golden Boot
- List of Bundesliga top scorers by season
- List of La Liga top scorers
- List of Süper Lig top scorers
- European Golden Shoe
- List of top international men's football goal scorers by country
