= Marius Trésor =

French footballer (born 1950)

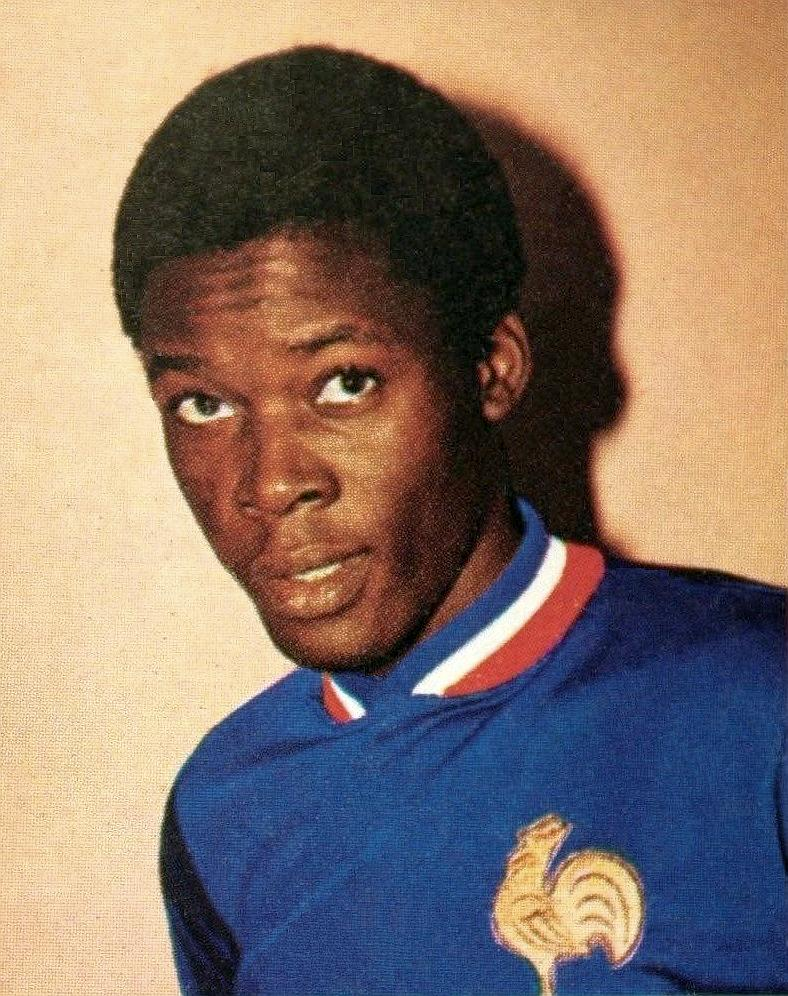
- Trésor with France in 1974

Personal information
- Full name: Marius Paul Trésor
- Date of birth: 15 January 1950 (age 76)
- Place of birth: Sainte-Anne, Guadeloupe, France
- Height: 1.82 m (6 ft 0 in)
- Position: Defender

Youth career
- 1958–1969: Juventus de Sainte-Anne

Senior career*
Years	Team	Apps	(Gls)
1969–1972	Ajaccio	92	(1)
1972–1980	Marseille	253	(8)
1980–1984	Bordeaux	93	(3)
Total		438	(12)

International career
1971–1983	France	65	(4)
- * Club domestic league appearances and goals

Marius Paul Trésor (French pronunciation: [maʁjys pɔl tʁezɔʁ]; born 15 January 1950) is a French former professional footballer who played as a centre-back. He is regarded as one of the best defenders of his generation.

== Early life and education ==
Marius Paul Trésor was born on 15 January 1950 in Sainte-Anne, Guadeloupe. His father, named Solange Geneviève, was a foreman in the large neighboring sugar cane plantation. His mother Laetitia Trésor was a seasonal worker, employed to collect and assemble the already cut cane: she raised the little Marius alone. Marius Paul, a rebellious child, hated studies, but, obeying his mother’s injunctions, he obtained his middle school certificate or "brevet". He always liked to tinker, and wished then to work as an electrician.

Between 12 and 13 years old, he began to participate in middle-distance races, et oftenly, he wins on 1500 or 2000 meters. His first training club was Juventus Sainte Anne. He learned the art of tackling at 15 years old, by analyzing, like an electrical diagram, the photographs of Charles Alfred and Kaelbel published in the magazine Miroir Sprint. At 16 years old, this longiligne athlete ran the 250 meters in 29 seconds. Besides football on the field or on the beach, he also began the practice of cycling and tried athletics. At 17 years old, he patiently observed the soccer ball teaching courses of a Guadeloupian father who has returned from metropolitan France, for his son.

The economic situation of his West Indian island seemed blocked to him: there were no good jobs, and leaving Guadeloupe was the only way out. He planned to advance his military service, so a recruit in the French army, he would not depend on his mother’s work. Which did not prevent him, by ideal of justice at 17 years old, from joining the Communist Party of Guadeloupe, which showed a willingness to participate in the struggle for civil rights and economic emancipation of black Americans

== Career ==
Trésor's professional career began with the French club Ajaccio in 1969: a young forward and champion of Guadeloupe in 1968–69 with Juventus Sainte Anne, he made his debut as a substitute in the 69th minute of the match Valenciennes–Ajaccio on 23 November 1969, replacing Tomei. Eight weeks later, his coach Alberto Muro decided to make the best use of this athletic mass in central defense. He then played for Marseille from 1972 before signing with Bordeaux in 1980. With Marseille Trésor won the 1975–76 Coupe de France against Lyon (score 2–0), and with Bordeaux he obtained the 1983–84 French Division 1 title. Having recovered poorly from injuries, he stopped his career at the end of 1984.

At the end of 1971, Trésor was surprised to receive a first call-up to the France national team led by Georges Boulogne. He participated in the internship in Saint-Malo and immediately obtained his first selection on 4 December 1971, during the match between Bulgaria and France, lost 2–1 in Sofia at the Vasil Levski Stadium. For the France national team, Trésor, essential central defender and moreover captain since 1976, after the withdrawal of Jean Michel Larqué, played in the World Cup in 1978 and 1982. He obtained 65 international caps, scoring four goals.

== Recognition ==
Trésor is regarded by some as one of the best defenders of his generation, and as one of France's more notable defenders.

He was named by Pelé as one of the top 125 greatest living footballers.

== Career statistics ==
=== Club ===
Appearances and goals by club, season and competition
Club	Season	League		
Club	Season	Division	Apps	Goals
Ajaccio	1969–70	Division 1	12	0
Ajaccio	1970–71	Division 1	33	0
Ajaccio	1971–72	Division 1	38	1
Ajaccio	1972–73	Division 1	9	0
Ajaccio	Total		92	1
Marseille	1972–73	Division 1	24	1
Marseille	1973–74	Division 1	38	0
Marseille	1974–75	Division 1	37	1
Marseille	1975–76	Division 1	38	1
Marseille	1976–77	Division 1	22	1
Marseille	1977–78	Division 1	35	4
Marseille	1978–79	Division 1	25	0
Marseille	1979–80	Division 1	34	0
Marseille	Total		253	8
Bordeaux	1980–81	Division 1	25	0
Bordeaux	1981–82	Division 1	37	2
Bordeaux	1982–83	Division 1	19	0
Bordeaux	1983–84	Division 1	12	1
Bordeaux	Total		93	3
Career total			438	12

=== International goals ===
Scores and results list France's goal tally first, score column indicates score after each Trésor goal.

List of international goals scored by Marius Trésor
No.	Date	Venue	Opponent	Score	Result	Competition
1	13 October 1974	Parkstadion, Gelsenkirchen, Germany	West Germany	1–2	1–2	Friendly
2	30 June 1977	Maracanã, Rio de Janeiro, Brazil	Brazil	2–2	2–2	Friendly
3	7 October 1978	Stade Municipal, Luxembourg City, Luxembourg	Luxembourg	2–0	3–1	Euro 1980 qualification
4	8 July 1982	Estadio Ramón Sánchez Pizjuán, Seville, Spain	West Germany	2–1	3–3 (4–5 on penalties)	1982 FIFA World Cup

== Honours ==
Marseille

- Coupe de France: 1975–76

Bordeaux

- Division 1: 1983–84

Individual

- French Player of the Year: 1972 and 1973
- Sport Ideal European XI: 1977, 1978
- Onze Mondial: 1977, 1982
- World XI: 1982, 1983
- 6th French Player of the Century
- FIFA 100

Orders

- Knight of the Legion of Honour: 1984
- Officer of the Legion of Honour: 2026

== Quotations ==
On the necessary rigor in defense and existence of space for creativity and freedom left to the attack, in soccer ball :

- The defender’s responsibility is greater than that of the attacker. The slightest mistake is not forgiven, especially during the final minutes of the match. It follows that the attack, on the other hand, more free and creative remains better favored than defense.

On soccer team solidarity and his victory in the French Cup with OM in 1976

- If we won the cup in 1976, it’s because of the excellent atmosphere that prevailed in the team. We really formed a supportive and unwavering band among players

Marius Trésor's analysis and intelligence of game available in two sports, rugby and Association football, which come from the same origin.

- The rugby game is developed around a large number of static phases. These call for precise combinations that it is up to the field captain to command. On the other hand, soccerball sport is much more moving or fluid, more elusive. The strategic influence of the captain in rugby is exerted in a concrete way, linked to the nature of this sport, which brings another collective dimension. The aggressiveness of the players marks rugby, insofar as this necessary common activity is channeled and not provoked (...) Soccerball favors more the excess of individualism than rugby. It is rare that the players of a soccerball team are in unison on a goal to achieve

To denounce ordinary racism and other stupid differentiation

- I am pleased that a great player scores a thousand goals in his career: But, whether he is black or white, yellow or red (...), it’s all the same.

On the anticipated shortness of a sports career, associated with a professional conscience.

- On a choisi un métier qui dure une quinzaine d'année (We chose a profession that lasts about fifteen years).

On his love of snow and winter resort sports :

- I would have liked there to be snow in Guadeloupe, my beloved island of birth.

== Discography ==
Kindly harassed by two music producers in the mid-70s, Marius Trésor, then an OM player and known for being occasionally a singer with a beautiful voice, finally recorded an album or disc 45 rpm in 1978 entitled Sacré Marius / Dans la vie faut rigoler, containing the following listening tracks : Sacré Marius (Sacred Marius), Parle-moi (Talk To Me), Maracana, Mon tout petit (My Little One), Droit au but (Straight to the Goal), Dans la vie faut rigoler (In Life You Have to Laugh), Le rire à Marius (The Laughter of Marius), Le reggae du soleil (Reggae Of The Sun), Tous les enfants du monde (All The Children Of The World), Avec la tête et les pieds (With The Head And The Feet).

== Bibliography ==
- Gérard Ernault, TRESOR sans peur et sans reproche, collection "Médailles d'or" (Gold medals) directed by Edouard Seidler, Calmann-Lévy, 1976, 125 pages. ISBN 2-7021-0162-3 (Libero Marius Trésor without fear and reproach)
- Marius Trésor with Denis Granjou, Au-delà de mes rêves (Autobiographie), City Editions, Clamecy, 2021, 238 pages. ISBN 9782824618746 (Memoirs of Marius Trésor, entitled Beyond my dreams)

== Videography ==
- Marius Trésor, Marius de Marseille, film by Antony Fayada, DVD format, from the series Les Légendes de l'OM (Legends of Olympic Marseille), Éditions France Télévisions Distribution, 2011, 26 minutes broadcast on You-tube
- Champions de France - Marius Trésor, a portrait filmed and told by Yasmina Khadra, co-directed by Pascal Blanchard (historian and documentary filmmaker) and Rachid Bouchareb, série Champions de France, 2016, two minutes broadcast on You-tube
- Mon père Marius Trésor (My father Marius Trésor), 9 October 2025, documentary Comic Strip production of 51 minutes 46 seconds, film directed by Julie Mauduy and Thierry Trésor, broadcast on France TV from February to September 2026. This documentary is made on the life of Marius Trésor by his son for his 75th birthday, with his friends or relatives Patrick Battiston, Alain Couriol, Pierre Dottelonde (Historian of Corsica), Ciryl Gane, Alain Giresse, Gérard Gob, Gérard Janvion, Jules Koundé, Frédéric Piquionne, Robert Pires, Michel Platini, Yannick Stopyra, Jean Tigana, Lilian Thuram, Jacques Vendroux (former sports journalist and animator of the "Variétés Club de France"), Zinedine Zidane etc.
