= List of Ligue 1 records and statistics =

French Football Ligue 1 records

The following is a list of records attained in French Football Ligue 1 since the league foundation in 1932.

== Club statistics ==
=== Titles and points ===
- Most titles: 14, Paris Saint-Germain
- Most consecutive titles: 7, Lyon (2002–08)
- Most points in a single season:
  - 38-match season: 96, Paris Saint-Germain (2015–16)
  - 34-match season: 84, Paris Saint-Germain (2024–25)

=== Wins and unbeaten runs ===
- Most wins in a single season:
  - 38-match season: 30, Paris Saint-Germain (2015–16) and Monaco (2016–17)
  - 34-match season: 26, Paris Saint-Germain (2024-25)
- Most home victories in a single season: 19, Saint-Étienne (1974–75)
- Most away victories in a single season: 15, Paris Saint-Germain (2015–16)
- Most consecutive victories: 16, Monaco (between 25 February 2017 and 17 August 2017)
- Most consecutive victories in a single season: 14, Paris Saint-Germain (2018–19)
- Most consecutive home victories: 28, Saint-Étienne (between 13 March 1974 and 27 August 1975)
- Most consecutive away victories: 9, Marseille (between 15 February 2009 and 8 August 2009)
- Biggest win: Sochaux 12–1 Valenciennes (1 July 1935)
- Biggest away win: Troyes 0–9 Paris Saint-Germain (13 March 2016)
- Longest unbeaten run: 36 matches, Paris Saint-Germain (between 15 March 2015 and 20 February 2016)
- Longest unbeaten run within a single season: 32 matches, Nantes (1994–95)
- Longest home unbeaten run: 92 matches, Nantes (between 15 May 1976 and 7 April 1981)
- Longest away unbeaten run: 39 matches, Paris Saint-Germain (between 11 February 2023 – 03 May 2025)

=== Losses ===
- Fewest losses in a single season: 1, Nantes (1994–95)
- Fewest home losses in a single season: 0 (58 times)
  - Angers (1971–72)
  - Auxerre (1984–85, 1988–89, 1991–92)
  - Bastia (1972–73, 1976–77)
  - Bordeaux (1984–85, 1985–86, 1987–88, 1992–93, 2008–09)
  - Cannes (1989–90)
  - Laval (1985–86)
  - Lens (1976–77, 2001–02)
  - Lillois (1933–34)
  - Lyon (1994–95, 2001–02)
  - Marseille (1937–38, 1947–48, 1970–71, 1988–89, 1998–99)
  - Monaco (1982–83, 1992–93, 1996–97, 1999–2000)
  - Nancy (1977–78)
  - Nantes (1965–66, 1966–67, 1976–77, 1977–78, 1978–79, 1979–80, 1994–95)
  - Nîmes (1952–53, 1958–59)
  - Paris Saint-Germain (1985–86, 1993–94, 2014–15, 2016–17, 2018–19, 2021–22)
  - Racing Club (1938–39)
  - Saint-Étienne (1973–74, 1974–75, 1975–76, 1976–77)
  - Sète (1933–34, 1936–37)
  - Sochaux (1936–37, 2002–03)
  - Strasbourg (1974–75, 1977–78, 1978–79)
  - Toulouse (1953–54, 1986–87)
  - Valenciennes (1964–65)
- Fewest away losses in a single season: 0, Paris Saint-Germain (2023–24)

=== Top flight appearances ===
- Most seasons in top flight: 77, Marseille
- Most consecutive seasons in top flight: 53, Paris Saint-Germain (1974–present)

=== Goals ===
- Highest-scoring season:
  - 38-match season: 1946–47 (134 goals; 3.51 average per match)
  - 34-match season: 1948–49 (113 goals; 3.71 average per match)
- Most goals scored by a team in a single season:
  - 38-match season: 118, RC Paris (1959–60)
  - 34-match season: 102, Lille (1948–49)
- Most goals in a single match: 13
  - Sochaux 12–1 Valenciennes (1 July 1935)
  - Marseille 3–10 Saint-Étienne (16 September 1951)
  - RC Paris 11–2 Metz (19 November 1961)
- Fewest goals conceded by a team in a single season: 19, Paris Saint-Germain (2015–16)
- Fewest home goals conceded by a team in a single season: 4, Saint-Étienne (2007–08)
- Fewest away goals conceded by a team in a single season: 7, Paris Saint-Germain (2015–16)
- Best goal difference in a single season:
  - 38-match season: +83, Paris Saint-Germain (2015–16)
  - 34-match season: +62, Lille (1948–49)

=== Disciplinary ===
- Most yellow cards in a season: 654 (2002–03)
- Most red cards in a season: 131 (2002–03)
- Most red cards by a team in a single season: 14, Montpellier (2013–14)

=== Manager ===
- Most matches managed: 894, Guy Roux (890 for Auxerre (1961–2000, 2001–2005) and 4 for Lens (2007–2008))

=== Attendance ===
- Highest overall attendance in a season:
  - 38-match season: 8,997,104 (2022–23)
  - 34-match season: 8,519,028 (2024–25)
- Highest average attendance in a season:
  - 38-match season: 23,677 (2022–23)
  - 34-match season: 27,840 (2024–25)
- Highest overall attendance in a single matchday: 307,775 (2018–19 matchday 1; 30,778 average per match)
- Highest attendance in a single match: 78,056, Lille v. Lyon at the Stade de France (7 March 2009)

== Player statistics ==
=== Most appearances ===
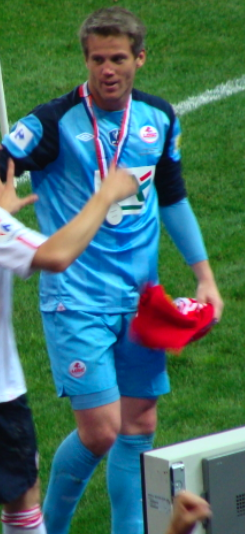
Mickaël Landreau

Rank	Player	Period	Club(s)	Games
1	Mickaël Landreau	1997–2014	Nantes, Paris Saint-Germain, Lille, Bastia	618
2	Jean-Luc Ettori	1975–1994	Monaco	602
3	Dominique Dropsy	1971–1989	Valenciennes, Strasbourg, Bordeaux	596
4	Dominique Baratelli	1967–1985	Ajaccio, Nice, Paris Saint-Germain	593
5	Alain Giresse	1970–1988	Bordeaux, Marseille	586
6	Sylvain Kastendeuch	1982–2001	Metz, Saint-Étienne, Toulouse	577
7	Patrick Battiston	1973–1991	Bordeaux, Metz, Saint-Étienne, Monaco	558
8	Jacky Novi	1964–1980	Marseille, Nîmes, Paris Saint-Germain, Strasbourg	545
9	Roger Marche	1944–1962	Stade Reims, RC Paris	542
10	Jean-Paul Bertrand-Demanes	1969–1988	Nantes	532

=== Goalscorers ===
Rank	Player	Period	Club(s)	Goals	Games	Ratio
1	Delio Onnis	1972–1986	Monaco, Reims, Tours, Toulon	299	449	0.67
2	Bernard Lacombe	1969–1987	Lyon, Saint-Étienne, Bordeaux	255	497	0.51
3	Hervé Revelli	1965–1978	Saint-Étienne, Nice	216	389	0.56
4	Roger Courtois	1932–1956	Sochaux, Troyes	210	288	0.73
5	Thadée Cisowski	1947–1961	Metz, RC Paris, Valenciennes	206	286	0.72
6	Roger Piantoni	1950–1966	FC Nancy, Reims, Nice	203	394	0.52
7	Kylian Mbappé	2015–2024	Monaco, Paris Saint-Germain	191	246	0.78
8	Joseph Ujlaki	1947–1964	Stade Français, Sète, Nîmes, Nice, RC Paris	190	438	0.43
9	Fleury Di Nallo	1960–1975	Lyon, Red Star	187	425	0.44
10	Carlos Bianchi	1973–1980	Reims, Paris Saint-Germain, Strasbourg	179	220	0.81
10	Gunnar Andersson	1950–1960	Marseille, Bordeaux	179	234	0.76

=== Most titles won ===
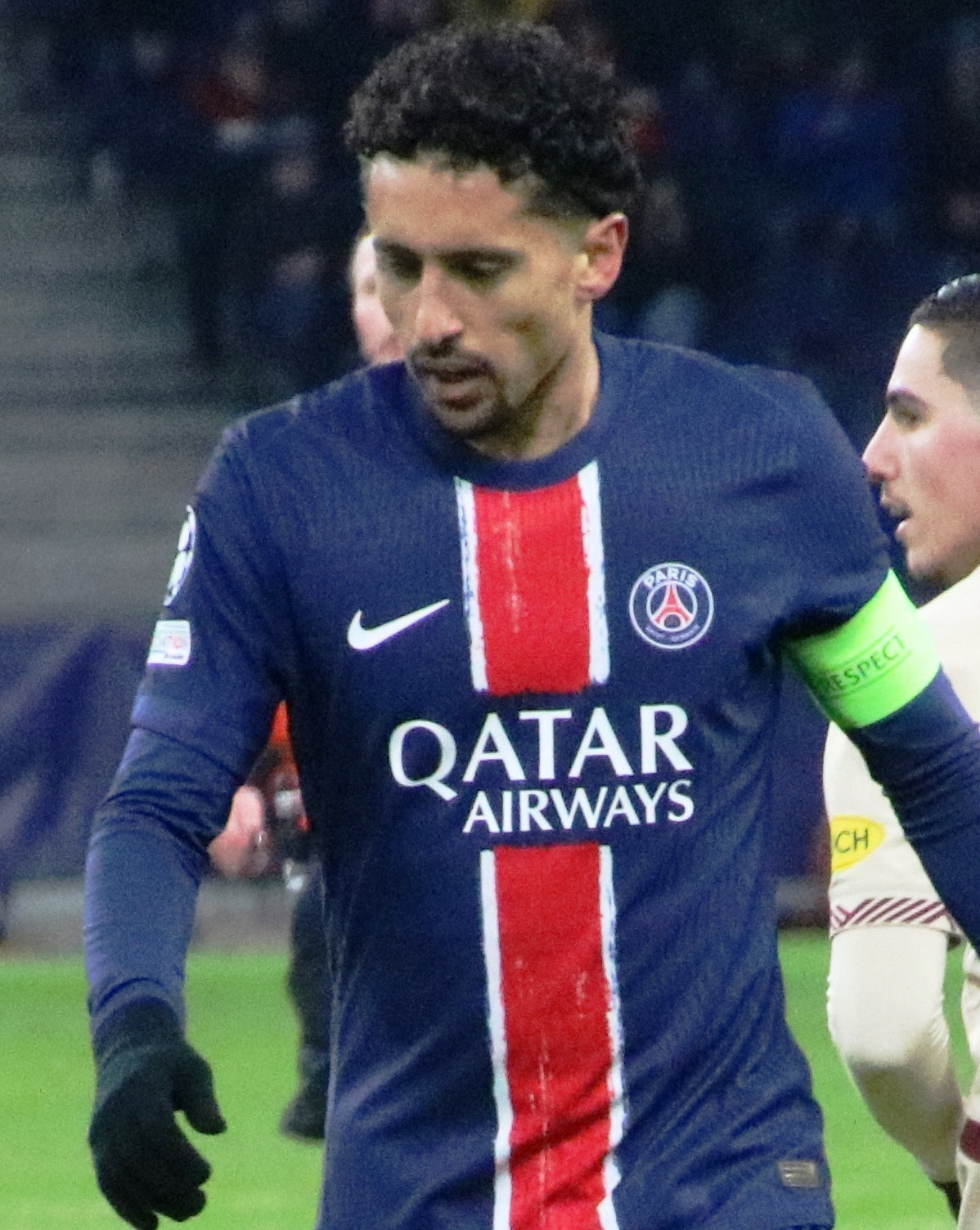
Marquinhos holds the record of most Ligue 1 titles for a player, with eleven.

Eleven titles

- Marquinhos (Paris Saint-Germain) (2014, 2015, 2016, 2018, 2019, 2020, 2022, 2023, 2024, 2025 and 2026)

Nine titles

- Marco Verratti (Paris Saint-Germain) (2013, 2014, 2015, 2016, 2018, 2019, 2020, 2022 and 2023)

Eight titles

- Presnel Kimpembe (Paris Saint-Germain) (2015, 2016, 2018, 2019, 2020, 2022, 2023 and 2025)

Seven titles

- Sidney Govou, Grégory Coupet and Juninho (Lyon) (2002, 2003, 2004, 2005, 2006, 2007 and 2008)
- Jean-Michel Larqué and Hervé Revelli (Saint-Étienne) (1967, 1968, 1969, 1970, 1974, 1975 and 1976)
- Thiago Silva (Paris Saint-Germain) (2013, 2014, 2015, 2016, 2018, 2019 and 2020)
- Kylian Mbappé (Monaco, Paris Saint-Germain) (2017, 2018, 2019, 2020, 2022, 2023 and 2024)

=== Goalkeeping ===
- Most saves in a single match: 13, Guillermo Ochoa, for Ajaccio against Marseille, 2011
- Most consecutive minutes without conceding at home: Jérémie Janot for Saint-Étienne, 1,534 minutes without conceding in 2004–05 and 2005–06 seasons (17 games)
- Most consecutive minutes without conceding: Gaëtan Huard for Bordeaux, 1,176 minutes without conceding in 1992–93 season (13 games)

=== Goalscoring ===
- Most goals in a single season: Josip Skoblar, 44
  - Each season: See List of Ligue 1 top scorers
- Most goals in a single match: 7, Jean Nicolas, for Rouen against Valenciennes, 1938; André Abegglen, for Sochaux against Valenciennes, 1935
- Most games scored in a row: Vahid Halilhodžić (Nantes), 9 matches in a row (1984–1985); Zlatan Ibrahimović (Paris Saint-Germain), 9 matches in a row (2015–2016)

=== Other records ===
- Most red cards received by a player: 19, Cyril Rool
- Youngest player to appear in a match: Kalman Gerencseri, aged 15 years, 225 days (for Lens against Monaco on 21 August 1960)
- Youngest player to score a hat-trick: Jérémy Ménez, aged 17 years, 260 days (for Sochaux against Bordeaux on 22 January 2005)
- Fastest goal: 7.9 seconds, Michel Rio (for Caen against Cannes on 15 February 1992)
- Fastest hat-trick: 4 minutes and 30 seconds, Loïs Openda (for Lens against Clermont Foot on 12 March 2023)
- Most consecutive unbeaten matches: 51, Fabián Ruiz.
