= List of Ligue 1 players =

This is a list of Ligue 1 players who have made 400 or more appearances in Ligue 1. Current Ligue 1 players and their clubs are shown in bold. Players currently active outside of Ligue 1 are shown in italics.

== Players ==
As of matches played 14 December 2025

Player	Nationality	Position	Apps	Club(s)	Titles
Mickaël Landreau	France	GK	618	Nantes; Paris Saint-Germain; Lille; Bastia	2 (2001, 2011)
Jean-Luc Ettori	France	GK	602	Monaco	
Dominique Dropsy	France	GK	596	Valenciennes; Strasbourg; Bordeaux	3 (1979, 1985, 1987)
Dominique Baratelli	France	GK	593	Ajaccio; Nice; Paris Saint-Germain	
Alain Giresse	France	MF	586	Bordeaux; Marseille	2 (1984, 1985)
Sylvain Kastendeuch	France	DF	577	Metz; Saint-Étienne; Toulouse	
Patrick Battiston	France	DF	558	Bordeaux; Metz; Saint-Étienne; Monaco	5 (1981, 1984, 1985, 1987, 1988)
Steve Mandanda	France	GK	555	Marseille; Rennes	1 (2010)
Jacky Novi	France	DF	545	Marseille; Nîmes; Paris Saint-Germain; Strasbourg	3 (1971, 1972, 1979)
Roger Marche	France	DF	542	Reims; RC Paris	2 (1949, 1953)
Jean-Paul Bertrand-Demanes	France	GK	532	Nantes	4 (1973, 1977, 1980, 1983)
Florent Balmont	France	MF	512	Lyon; Toulouse; Nice; Lille; Dijon	2 (2003, 2011)
Hilton	Brazil	DF	512	Bastia; Lens; Marseille; Montpellier	2 (2010, 2012)
Sylvain Armand	France	DF	506	Nantes; Paris Saint-Germain	2 (2001, 2013)
Loïc Amisse	France	FW	503	Nantes	3 (1977, 1980, 1983)
Dimitri Payet	France	FW	492	Nantes; Saint-Étienne; Lille; Marseille	
Daniel Congré	France	DF	490	Toulouse; Montpellier	
Bernard Lama	France	GK	489	Lille; Metz; Brest; Lens; Paris Saint-Germain; Rennes	1 (1994)
Claude Puel	France	MF	486	Monaco	2 (1982, 1988)
Daniel Bravo	France	MF	485	Nice; Monaco; Paris Saint-Germain; Lyon; Marseille	1 (1994)
Franck Silvestre	France	DF	485	Sochaux; Auxerre; Montpellier; Bastia	1 (1996)
Jimmy Briand	France	FW	483	Rennes; Lyon; Guingamp; Bordeaux	
Serge Chiesa	France	MF	475	Lyon	
Laurent Batlles	France	MF	472	Toulouse; Bordeaux; Rennes; Bastia; Marseille; Grenoble; Saint-Étienne	
Grégory Coupet	France	GK	467	Saint-Étienne; Lyon; Paris Saint-Germain	7 (2002, 2003, 2004, 2005, 2006, 2007, 2008)
Étienne Didot	France	MF	460	Rennes; Toulouse; Guingamp	
**Benjamin André**	France	MF	451	Ajaccio; Rennes; **Lille**	1 (2021)
Paul Le Guen	France	MF	443	Brest; Nantes; Paris Saint-Germain	1 (1994)
Charles Orlanducci	France	DF	440	Bastia	
Manuel Amoros	France	DF	435	Monaco; Marseille; Lyon	5 (1982, 1988, 1990, 1991, 1992)
Stéphane Ruffier	France	GK	428	Monaco; Saint-Étienne	
Rio Mavuba	France	MF	426	Bordeaux; Lille	1 (2011)
Anthony Réveillère	France	DF	426	Rennes; Lyon	5 (2004, 2005, 2006, 2007, 2008)
Jérémy Morel	Madagascar	DF	425	Lorient; Marseille; Lyon; Rennes	
Souleymane Camara	Senegal	FW	423	Monaco; Guingamp; Nice; Montpellier	1 (2012)
Mathieu Bodmer	France	MF	418	Lille; Lyon; Paris Saint-Germain; Saint-Étienne; Nice; Guingamp; Amiens	1 (2008)
Jérôme Leroy	France	MF	418	Paris Saint-Germain; Marseille; Guingamp; Lens; Sochaux; Rennes; Evian	
Frédéric Da Rocha	France	MF	413	Nantes; Boulogne	1 (2001)
**Anthony Lopes**	Portugal	GK	411	Lyon; **Nantes**	
Nicolas Penneteau	France	GK	411	Bastia; Valenciennes	
Jaroslav Plašil	Czech Republic	MF	411	Monaco; Bordeaux	
Benoît Costil	France	GK	407	Caen; Rennes; Bordeaux; Auxerre	
Benoît Pedretti	France	MF	407	Sochaux; Marseille; Lyon; Auxerre; Lille; Ajaccio; Nancy	1 (2006)
Benoît Cheyrou	France	MF	406	Lille; Auxerre; Marseille	1 (2010)
Ulrich Ramé	France	GK	406	Angers; Bordeaux	2 (1999, 2009)
Ludovic Giuly	France	MF	401	Lyon; Monaco; Paris Saint-Germain; Lorient	1 (2000)
Blaise Matuidi	France	MF	400	Troyes; Saint-Étienne; Paris Saint-Germain	4 (2013, 2014, 2015, 2016)
