= Francis Gillot =

French footballer (born 1960)

Personal information
- Date of birth: 9 February 1960 (age 66)
- Place of birth: Maubeuge, France
- Position: Defender

Youth career
- 1970–1974: Villiers-Siré-Nicole
- 1974–1978: Valenciennes

Senior career*
Years	Team	Apps	(Gls)
1978–1982	Valenciennes	93	(6)
1982–1988	Lens	158	(10)
1988–1989	Strasbourg	20	(2)
1989–1993	Lens	90	(2)
1993	Mulhouse	5	(0)
1993–1996	Montauban		

Managerial career
- 2005–2007: Lens
- 2008–2011: Sochaux
- 2011–2014: Bordeaux
- 2014–2015: Shanghai Shenhua
- 2017: Auxerre
- * Club domestic league appearances and goals

Francis Gillot (French pronunciation: [fʁɑ̃sis ʒilo]; born 9 February 1960) is a football manager and former player who most recently managed Ligue 2 team AJ Auxerre.

As a player, he was a defender and predominantly associated with his time at Valenciennes and Lens while having brief periods with Strasbourg as well as Mulhouse before ending his career with Montauban. Since retiring he initially moved into youth coaching before moving into assistant management and then gaining his first head coaching position with his former club Lens. He has gone on to manage Sochaux and went on to win the 2012–13 Coupe de France with Bordeaux.

== Playing career ==
Born in Maubeuge, France, Francis Gillot started his football career playing for the youth team of his local club Villiers-Siré-Nicole before joining the Valenciennes FC academy. At Valencianones he worked his way up into the senior team and in the 1978–79 season he started his professional career when he was included in the squad for the Ligue 1 outfit. He eventually became a regular starter in the team's defence until they were relegated at the end of the 1981–82 French Division 1 season.

In the following season Gillot moved to top-tier club RC Lens and experienced continental competitions with the club during his initial time with the team until the manager Jean Parisseaux decided he could be loan to RC Strasbourg in the 1988–89 campaign. Upon his return to Lens the club found themselves in the second tier after experiencing relegation, however Gillot stayed with the team until they won promotion back into the top tier at the end of the 1990–91 French Division 2 season. After spending several further seasons with Lens, Gillot was nearing the end of his career and he joined second-tier club FC Mulhouse for a brief period before ending his career with lower league side FC Montauban.

== Managerial career ==
After retiring from playing Gillot, soon moved into coaching and joined the FC Sochaux U15 team as a trainer in 1996. He rose to be the team's U19 coach as well as the assistant coach to former head coaches Philippe Anziani and Jean Fernandez. After spending several years with the club he left in 2003 to go abroad to join United Arab Emirates football team Al Ain FC and be their assistant coach under fellow countryman Bruno Metsu. After spending one season abroad, Gillot returned to France as an assistant to Joël Müller at his former club RC Lens.

At Lens, Gillot was promoted to the team's manager after Joël Müller resigned on 24 January 2005, and for the remainder of the season he guided the club to a seventh-place finish. In his first full season Gillot would impress the fans with his outspokenness, confidence towards youth and offensive play that saw the team move up to fourth and qualification for the 2006–07 UEFA Cup. This saw a growing expectation from the fans that the club could achieve more, however the club finished fifth and a point away from qualification for the 2007–08 UEFA Champions League. Unable to exceed expectations Gillot resigned on 28 May 2007; however he still remained at the club as a recruiter.

On 2 January 2008, Gillot joined struggling top-tier side Sochaux as their new manager after replacing Frédéric Hantz and in his debut season led the club to safety from the relegation zone. The following season the club would continue to struggle to avoid relegation; however Gillot was offered a two-year contract to remain with the team after avoiding relegation once again Sochaux's results significantly improved in the 2010–11 Ligue 1 campaign, which saw the club finish fifth. Despite the club gaining qualification for the 2011–12 UEFA Europa League and Gillot gaining a nomination for French coach of the year award, Gillot decided to publicly declare that he wanted to leave the club. On 5 June 2011, he officially resigned from his post; however he immediately took over Bordeaux the following day, leading many from the French media to suspect that Gillot intentionally engineered the move to gain a larger operating budget from his new club and a higher salary.

On 6 June 2011, Gillot was officially signed on as the new head coach of Bordeaux with a two-year contract at the club. In his debut season he guided them to a fifth-place finish and qualification for the 2012–13 UEFA Europa League where he led them to the round of 16 before being knocked out by Benfica, 4–2 on aggregate. His reign at the club reached its peak when he won the 2012–13 Coupe de France by beating Evian Thonon Gaillard F.C. 3–2 in the final, which saw him rewarded with a two-year extension to his contract. In the following season, results within the league did not improve and the club were knocked out in the group stages of the 2013–14 UEFA Europa League and after a 1–1 draw with Olympique de Marseille on 10 May 2014, he announced that he would be leaving the club at the end of the season.

Gillot was appointed as the new manager of AJ Auxerre on 1 June 2017. He was sacked on 9 December 2017.

== Career statistics ==
Appearances and goals by club, season and competition
Season	Club	League			Cups		Europe		Total	
Season	Club	Division	Apps	Goals	Apps	Goals	Apps	Goals	Apps	Goals
Valenciennes	1978–79	French Division 1	4	0	0	0	-	-	4	0
Valenciennes	1979–80	French Division 1	16	0	2	0	–	–	18	0
Valenciennes	1980-81	French Division 1	22	2	1	0	–	–	23	2
Valenciennes	1981-82	French Division 1	35	2	7	1	–	–	42	3
Valenciennes	1982–83	Ligue 2	16	2	0	0	–	–	16	2
Valenciennes	Total		93	6	10	1	0	0	103	7
Lens	1982–83	French Division 1	6	0	1	0	–	–	7	0
Lens	1983–84	French Division 1	19	1	5	0	4	0	28	1
Lens	1984–85	French Division 1	29	3	5	2	–	–	34	5
Lens	1985–86	French Division 1	36	2	5	0	–	–	41	2
Lens	1986–87	French Division 1	32	3	7	0	2	0	41	3
Lens	1987–88	French Division 1	36	1	6	0	–	–	42	1
Lens	Total		158	10	29	2	6	0	193	12
Strasbourg	1988–89	French Division 1	20	2	3	0	–	–	23	2
Lens	1989–90	French Division 2	27	0	1	0	–	–	28	0
Lens	1990–91	French Division 2	27	3	6	0	–	–	33	3
Lens	1991–92	French Division 1	29	2	2	0	–	–	31	2
Lens	1992–93	French Division 1	5	0	0	0	–	–	5	0
Lens	Total		88	5	9	0	0	0	97	5
Mulhouse	1992–93	French Division 2	5	0	1	0	–	–	6	0
Montauban	1993–94	Midi-Pyrénées Division Honneur			0	0	–	–	0	0
Montauban	1994–95	National 3 Group G			1	0	–	–	1	0
Montauban	1995–96	National 3 Group G			1	0	–	–	1	0
Montauban	Total				2	0	0	0	2	0
Career total			364	23	54	3	6	0	424	26

== Managerial record ==
As of 9 December 2017

Club	From	To	Record				
Club	From	To	G	W	D	L	Win %
Lens	24 January 2005	28 May 2007	130	55	42	33	42.31
Sochaux	2 January 2008	5 June 2011	148	52	35	61	35.14
Bordeaux	6 June 2011	23 May 2014	148	56	50	42	37.84
Shanghai Shenhua	4 December 2014	29 November 2015	37	16	8	13	43.24
Auxerre	1 June 2017	9 December 2017	19	5	5	9	26.32
Total			482	184	140	158	38.17

== Honours ==
=== As a player ===
Montauban

- National 3 Group G: 1996
- Midi-Pyrénées Division Honneur: 1994

=== As a coach ===
Lens

- UEFA Intertoto Cup: 2005

Bordeaux

- Coupe de France: 2012–13
