= Delio Onnis =

Football player and manager (born 1948)

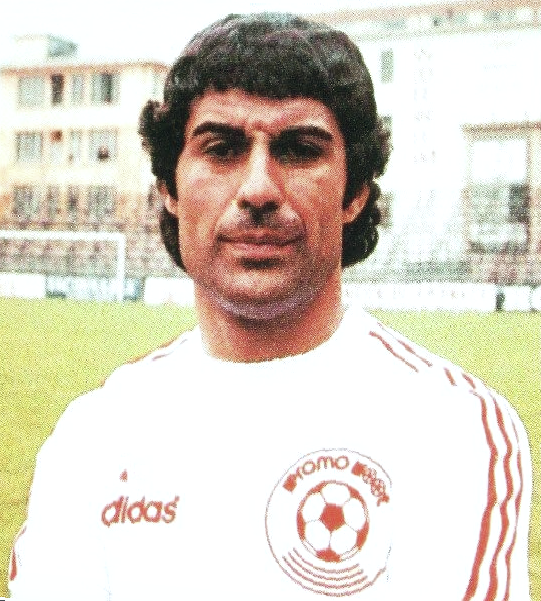
- Onnis in 1978

Personal information
- Date of birth: 24 March 1948 (age 78)
- Place of birth: Giuliano di Roma, Italy
- Height: 1.80 m (5 ft 11 in)
- Position: Striker

Youth career
- 1963–1967: Almagro

Senior career*
Years	Team	Apps	(Gls)
1966–1968	Almagro	18	(11)
1968–1971	Gimnasia	95	(53)
1971–1973	Reims	65	(39)
1973–1980	Monaco	232	(187)
1980–1983	Tours	110	(64)
1983–1986	Toulon	74	(39)
Total		594	(393)

Managerial career
- 1990–1991: Toulon
- 1992–1995: Paris
- * Club domestic league appearances and goals

Delio Onnis (born 24 March 1948) is a former professional football player who played as a striker. Born in Italy, his family emigrated to Argentina in his youth and he was nicknamed "El Tano" (the Italian) in Argentina.

With 299 goals, he is the all-time top goalscorer in the history of Ligue 1 in France, and was the league's top scorer on five occasions. He played the majority of his career for Reims, Monaco, Tours and Toulon. With Monaco, he won one league title and one Coupe de France.

== Career ==
Onnis was born in Giuliano di Roma in Italy, but moved to Argentina before he was three and subsequently gained Argentinian citizenship. Beginning his football career as a youth player for Almagro, he made a successful transition to the senior team and subsequently earned a move to Gimnasia La Plata where he played alongside players like Roberto Zywica. He was the star striker for the team that finished third in 1970, which brought him to the attention of scouts from Europe.

In 1971, he joined Reims at the same time as his compatriot Zywica, finishing his first season with 22 goals and his second season with 17. In 1974, the newly promoted Monaco signed him and over the next seven seasons he was their top scorer every year, eventually scoring 223 goals, with 157 in the league. In 1976, the club were relegated, but Onnis stayed with them and helped them regain their top flight status for the 1977-78 season that saw them finish as league champions, and the following season win the Coupe de France.

In 1980, despite playing in one of the best teams in Division 1, he signed for newly promoted and inexperienced team Tours, where he was again Division 1 leading goalscorer. In 1983 Tours were relegated, and as a result he joined Toulon, where he finished his career in 1986.

== International career ==
Onnis was never called up for Argentina, which had a policy of favouring players who remained in the domestic league. Throughout the 1970s and 1980s, Onnis and Carlos Bianchi were behind compatriots such as Mario Kempes and Leopoldo Luque in the Argentinian pecking order.

== Scoring titles ==
Carlos Bianchi had been signed as his replacement at Reims in 1973–74. Bianchi went on to win five scoring titles over the next six seasons, including four back-to-back between 1975 and 1979, Onnis breaking Bianchi's run in 1974–75. Following Bianchi's return to Argentina in 1980, Onnis went on to win four back-to-back scoring titles of his own, leaving them with five apiece and meaning that in eleven seasons between 1973–74 and 1983–84 they won five scoring titles each with only Vahid Halilhodžić's win in 1982 for Nantes breaking their dominance. (Note: Twice the title was shared. In the first instance with Erwin Kostedde in 1979–80, and then with Patrice Garande in 1983–84)

== Career statistics ==
Appearances and goals by club, season and competition
Club	Season	League			Coupe de France		Europe		Total	
Club	Season	Division	Apps	Goals	Apps	Goals	Apps	Goals	Apps	Goals
Reims	1971–72	Division 1	32	22	8	4	—		40	26
Reims	1972–73	Division 1	33	17	3	2	—		36	19
Reims	Total		65	39	11	6	—		76	45
Monaco	1973–74	Division 1	31	26	9	10	—		40	36
Monaco	1974–75	Division 1	37	30	1	0	2 (Note: Appearances in European Cup Winners' Cup)	1	40	31
Monaco	1975–76	Division 1	33	29	1	0	—		34	29
Monaco	1976–77	Division 2	32	30	6	4	—		38	34
Monaco	1977–78	Division 1	35	29	9	8	—		44	37
Monaco	1978–79	Division 1	34	22	5	3	3 (Note: Appearances in European Cup)	1	42	26
Monaco	1979–80	Division 1	30	21	7	5	4 (Note: Appearances in UEFA Cup)	4	41	30
Monaco	Total		232	187	38	30	9	6	279	223
Tours	1980–81	Division 1	38	24	5	3	—		43	27
Tours	1981–82	Division 1	38	29	7	5	—		45	34
Tours	1982–83	Division 1	34	11	7	1	—		41	12
Tours	Total		110	64	19	9	—		129	73
Toulon	1983–84	Division 1	36	21	5	1	—		41	22
Toulon	1984–85	Division 1	30	17	1	0	—		31	17
Toulon	1985–86	Division 1	8	1	1	0	—		9	1
Toulon	Total		74	39	7	1	—		81	40
Career total			481	329	75	46	9	6	565	381

== Honours ==
Monaco

- Division 1: 1977–78
- Coupe de France: 1979–80
- Division 2: 1976–77

Individual

- French Division 1 top scorer: 1974–75, 1979–80, 1980–81, 1981–82, 1983–84
- French Division 2 top scorer: 1976–77
- French Division 1 Foreign Player of the Year: 1980

Records

- Ligue 1 all-time highest goalscorer: 299 goals
