= Bernard Lacombe =

French football player and manager (1952–2025)

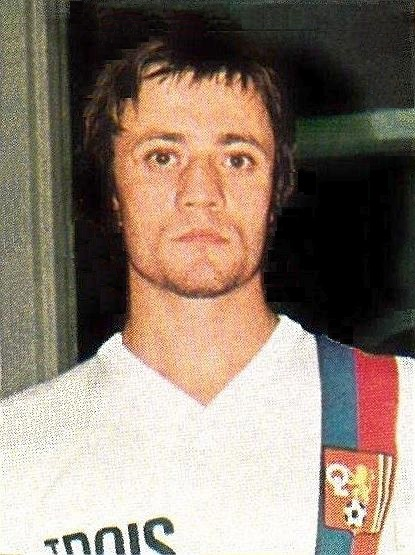
- Lacombe with Lyon in 1977

Personal information
- Date of birth: 15 August 1952
- Place of birth: Lyon, France
- Date of death: 17 June 2025 (aged 72)
- Place of death: Albigny-sur-Saône, France
- Height: 1.71 m (5 ft 7 in)
- Position: Striker

Youth career
- 1960–1969: CS Fontaines

Senior career*
Years	Team	Apps	(Gls)
1969–1978	Lyon	222	(123)
1978–1979	Saint-Étienne	32	(14)
1979–1987	Bordeaux	243	(118)
Total		497	(255)

International career
1973–1984	France	38	(12)

Managerial career
- 1996–2000: Lyon
Medal record
Representing France
UEFA European Championship
Winner	1984
- * Club domestic league appearances and goals

Bernard Lacombe (French pronunciation: [bɛʁnaʁ lakɔ̃b]; 15 August 1952 – 17 June 2025) was a French professional football player and manager. He played as a striker, mainly for Lyon, Bordeaux and Saint-Étienne and the France national football team.

== Career ==
Lacombe began his professional career with hometown club Lyon in 1969. One of his teammates, Aimé Jacquet, would be later his team manager (and the manager of the France national team which won the 1998 FIFA World Cup).

Lacombe earned his first cap for France in 1973. He went on to represent his nation at the 1978 World Cup, scoring after only 30 seconds against Italy, the fastest goal ever for a French player, and also the first goal of that tournament. Lacombe also played at the 1982 World Cup and won UEFA Euro 1984.

After a brief stay with Saint-Étienne, Lacombe joined Bordeaux, where he was re-united with Aimé Jacquet. He won three French Ligue 1 championships. Lacombe won the Coupe de France twice (with Lyon and Bordeaux), and scored a goal in the 1973 Coupe de France Final.

With 255 goals scored in Ligue 1, he is the second-best striker of all-time in the French championship, after Delio Onnis.

After his playing career ended, Lacombe joined the technical staff of former club Lyon, first as technical manager (from 1988 to 1996), then as trainer (1996 to 2000) and manager. He was instrumental in the successes of the club in Ligue 1 and also on the European scene, helping lead his side to seven-straight UEFA Champions League appearances. Lacombe served as a "special adviser" to team president Jean-Michel Aulas for twenty years. He also had significant influence on choices made; for example, he helped retain several Brazilian players who would join Lyon during the 2000s, including Juninho, Edmílson, Cris, Caçapa and Fred.

== Death ==
Lacombe died on 17 June 2025, at the age of 72.

== Career statistics ==
=== Club ===
Appearances and goals by club, season and competition
Club	Season	League			Cup		Europe		Total	
Club	Season	Division	Apps	Goals	Apps	Goals	Apps	Goals	Apps	Goals
Lyon	1969–70	Division 1	5	1			—		5	1
Lyon	1970–71	Division 1	3	0			—		3	0
Lyon	1971–72	Division 1	36	19			—		36	19
Lyon	1972–73	Division 1	35	23			—		35	23
Lyon	1973–74	Division 1	31	13			4 (Note: Appearances in European Cup Winners' Cup)	1	35	14
Lyon	1974–75	Division 1	27	17			4 (Note: Appearances in UEFA Cup)	4	31	21
Lyon	1975–76	Division 1	16	5			0	0	16	5
Lyon	1976–77	Division 1	36	21			—		36	21
Lyon	1977–78	Division 1	33	24			—		33	24
Lyon	Total		222	123			8	5	230	128
Saint-Étienne	1978–79	Division 1	32	14			—		32	14
Bordeaux	1979–80	Division 1	33	11			—		33	11
Bordeaux	1980–81	Division 1	34	18			—		34	18
Bordeaux	1981–82	Division 1	33	17			3	1	36	18
Bordeaux	1982–83	Division 1	33	20			6	0	39	20
Bordeaux	1983–84	Division 1	35	18			2	0	37	18
Bordeaux	1984–85	Division 1	36	22			8 (Note: Appearances in European Cup)	3	44	25
Bordeaux	1985–86	Division 1	23	7			1	0	24	7
Bordeaux	1986–87	Division 1	16	5			2	0	18	5
Bordeaux	Total		243	118			22	4	265	122
Career total			497	255			30	9	527	264

=== International ===
Appearances and goals by national team and year
National team	Year	Apps	Goals
France	1973	1	0
France	1974	3	2
France	1975	—	
France	1976	3	1
France	1977	4	0
France	1978	6	1
France	1979	4	4
France	1980	3	1
France	1981	3	2
France	1982	5	0
France	1983	—	
France	1984	6	1
Total		38	12

Scores and results list France's goal tally first, score column indicates score after each Lacombe goal.

List of international goals scored by Bernard Lacombe
No.	Date	Venue	Opponent	Score	Result	Competition
1	27 April 1974	Letná Stadium, Prague, Czechoslovakia	Czechoslovakia	2–0	3–3	Friendly
2	27 April 1974	Letná Stadium, Prague, Czechoslovakia	Czechoslovakia	3–2	3–3	Friendly
3	9 October 1976	Vasil Levski National Stadium, Sofia, Bulgaria	Bulgaria	2–0	2–2	1978 FIFA World Cup qualification
4	2 June 1978	World Cup Stadium, Mar del Plata, Argentina	Italy	1–0	1–2	1978 FIFA World Cup
5	7 May 1979	Giants Stadium, East Rutherford, United States	United States	1–0	6–0	Friendly
6	7 May 1979	Giants Stadium, East Rutherford, United States	United States	2–0	6–0	Friendly
7	7 May 1979	Giants Stadium, East Rutherford, United States	United States	3–0	6–0	Friendly
8	5 September 1979	Råsunda Stadium, Stockholm, Sweden	Sweden	1–0	3–1	UEFA Euro 1980 qualifying
9	11 October 1980	Tsirion Stadium, Limassol, Cyprus	Cyprus	1–0	7–0	1982 FIFA World Cup qualification
10	5 December 1981	Parc des Princes, Paris, France	Cyprus	2–0	4–0	1982 FIFA World Cup qualification
11	5 December 1981	Parc des Princes, Paris, France	Cyprus	3–0	4–0	1982 FIFA World Cup qualification
12	1 June 1984	Stade Vélodrome, Marseille, France	Scotland	2–0	2–0	Friendly

== Honours ==
=== Player ===
Lyon

- Coupe de France: 1972–73
- Trophée des Champions: 1973

Bordeaux

- Division 1: 1983–84, 1984–85, 1986–87
- Coupe de France: 1985–86, 1986–87
- Trophée des Champions: 1986

France

- UEFA European Championship: 1984

=== Manager ===
Lyon

- UEFA Intertoto Cup: 1997

Sporting positions
Preceded by Paul Breitner	FIFA World Cup opening goal 1978	Succeeded by Erwin Vandenbergh
