= Roberto Zywica =

Argentine footballer (1947–2025)

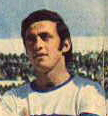
- Zywica in 1970

Personal information
- Full name: Roberto Jaime Zywica
- Date of birth: 21 January 1947
- Place of birth: Buenos Aires, Argentina
- Date of death: 18 July 2025 (aged 78)
- Height: 1.74 m (5 ft 9 in)
- Position: Midfielder

Senior career*
Years	Team	Apps	(Gls)
1966–1968	River Plate		
1969–1971	Gimnasia de La Plata	100	(4)
1971–1974	Reims	62	(2)
1974–1975	Troyes	11	(1)
1975–1976	Toulouse	26	(5)
1976–1977	Gazélec Ajaccio	25	(6)
1977–1978	All Boys		
- Nueva Chicago
- Banfield
- Atlanta

International career
- 1967 Argentina

Managerial career
- Belgrano
- 1993–1994: Tristán Suárez
- * Club domestic league appearances and goals

Roberto Zywica (21 January 1947 – 18 July 2025) was an Argentine football player and manager.

== Playing career ==
A midfielder, Zywica started his professional playing career in 1966 with River Plate. He joined Gimnasia La Plata where he was part of "La Barredora" team.

In 1971, he joined Reims alongside teammate Delio Onnis, where he played three seasons and was nicknamed "Roberto Z". He enjoyed three more seasons in France, with Troyes, Toulouse and Gazélec Ajaccio.

He ended his career in Argentina with stints with All Boys, Nueva Chicago, Banfield and Atlanta.

== Managerial career ==
Zywica managed Belgrano and Tristán Suárez in 1993–94.

== Death ==
Zywica died on 18 July 2025, at the age of 78.

== Sources ==
- Barreaud, Marc (1998). Dictionnaire des footballeurs étrangers du championnat professionnel français (1932–1997). L'Harmattan, Paris. ISBN 2-7384-6608-7.
