= 1976–77 French Division 2 =

38th season of the second-tier football league in France

Division 2
- Season: 1976–77

Statistics of Division 2 in the 1976/1977 season.

== Overview ==
It was contested by 36 teams, and AS Monaco and RC Strasbourg won the championship.

== League tables ==
=== Group A ===
Pos	Team	Pld	W	D	L	GF	GA	GD	Pts	Promotion or relegation
1	Monaco	34	19	10	5	64	35	+29	48	Promoted
2	Gueugnon	34	18	9	7	54	32	+22	45	
3	Toulon	34	16	12	6	49	30	+19	44	
4	Avignon	34	15	10	9	53	31	+22	40	
5	Auxerre	34	13	12	9	48	30	+18	38	
6	Toulouse	34	15	7	12	72	60	+12	37	
7	Angoulême	34	16	5	13	50	46	+4	37	
8	Béziers	34	14	9	11	41	50	−9	37	
9	Red Star Paris	34	14	7	13	51	47	+4	35	
10	Martigues	34	14	7	13	51	47	+4	35	
11	Cannes	34	14	7	13	48	33	+15	35	
12	Paris FC	34	12	10	12	49	33	+16	34	
13	Entente BFN	34	13	4	17	40	41	−1	30	
14	Arles	34	9	12	13	37	50	−13	30	
15	Gazélec Ajaccio	34	9	11	14	33	47	−14	29	
16	Bourges	34	6	9	19	29	56	−27	21	Relegated
17	Tavaux-Damparis	34	7	7	20	38	69	−31	21	Relegated
18	Sète	34	5	5	24	26	89	−63	15	Relegated

Source: rsssf.com

=== Group B ===
Pos	Team	Pld	W	D	L	GF	GA	GD	Pts	Promotion or relegation
1	RC Strasbourg	34	23	3	8	84	26	+58	49	Promoted
2	Rouen	34	17	10	7	62	39	+23	44	Promoted
3	Tours	34	14	11	9	58	44	+14	39	
4	Amicale de Lucé	34	14	9	11	47	43	+4	37	
5	Stade Quimpérois	34	15	6	13	48	44	+4	36	
6	Besançon	34	14	8	12	45	43	+2	36	
7	Épinal	34	13	9	12	44	50	−6	35	
8	Berrichonne Chateauroux	34	13	8	13	41	42	−1	34	
9	Noeux-les-Mines	34	11	11	12	31	31	0	33	
10	Stade Brest	34	12	8	14	39	44	−5	32	
11	Chaumont	34	13	6	15	44	65	−21	32	
12	Dunkerque	34	9	13	12	42	47	−5	31	
13	Saint-Dié	34	11	8	15	36	40	−4	30	
14	US Boulogne	34	11	8	15	36	40	−4	30	
15	Caen	34	11	8	15	43	51	−8	30	
16	Lorient	34	9	10	15	36	46	−10	28	Relegated
17	Amiens	34	9	10	15	36	56	−20	28	Relegated
18	Hazebrouck	34	9	9	16	35	48	−13	27	Relegated

Source: rsssf.com

== Championship play-offs ==
Team 1	Agg.	Team 2	1st leg	2nd leg
Strasbourg	3–1	Monaco	2–0	1–1

== Promotion play-offs ==
Team 1	Agg.	Team 2	1st leg	2nd leg
Gueugnon	2–4	Rouen	2–1	0–3
