= Patrick Battiston =

French footballer (born 1957)

Personal information
- Full name: Patrick Raymond Jean Battiston
- Date of birth: 12 March 1957 (age 69)
- Place of birth: Amnéville, Moselle, France
- Height: 1.82 m (6 ft 0 in)
- Position: Defender

Youth career
- 1966–1973: Talange

Senior career*
Years	Team	Apps	(Gls)
1973–1980	Metz	181	(19)
1980–1983	Saint-Étienne	101	(8)
1983–1987	Bordeaux	136	(10)
1987–1989	Monaco	68	(0)
1989–1991	Bordeaux	71	(1)
Total		557	(38)

International career
1977–1989	France	56	(3)
Medal record
Representing France
UEFA European Championship
Winner	1984
- * Club domestic league appearances and goals

Patrick Raymond Jean Battiston (born 12 March 1957) is a French former footballer who played as a defender for the France national team in three World Cups and won UEFA Euro 1984. At club level, he played for Metz, Saint-Étienne, Bordeaux, and Monaco, winning five Ligue 1 titles and one Coupe de France.

== Club career ==
Born in Amnéville, Moselle, Battiston began his career at lower league club Talange (1966–1973), before he was spotted and purchased by FC Metz (1973–1980). After seven years at that club, he moved to Saint-Etienne (1980–1983) for three years, where they won the 1981 Division 1 title, before moving to Bordeaux (1983–1987), where they won the 1984, 1985 and 1987 league titles and two Coupe de France. Battiston then moved on to Monaco (1987–1989), where they won the 1988 league title, before he returned to Bordeaux (1989–1991).

His professional career lasted 18 seasons. Twenty-five years after his retirement, he remained in the top ten of players with the most appearances in League 1, occupying the third spot for non-goalkeepers.

== International career ==
Battiston earned 56 caps for his national side, scoring three goals. He represented France in the 1978, 1982 and 1986 World Cups, and helped France to their victory at UEFA Euro 1984.

=== 1982 World Cup incident ===
Battiston is particularly remembered for the 1982 FIFA World Cup semi final in Seville, when France faced West Germany. He came off the bench in the second half, and after ten minutes of play, following a through ball by Platini, Battiston was clear through the German defence racing towards goal. The German goalkeeper, Harald Schumacher, raced towards Battiston as the Frenchman took the shot, missing the goal. Schumacher leapt into the air, twisting his body and colliding with Battiston. In the process Schumacher's hip hit the Frenchman's face. Battiston, clattered, fell to the ground unconscious, with damaged vertebrae and teeth knocked out, later slipping into a coma. Emergency medics had to administer oxygen on the pitch. Michel Platini later said that he thought that Battiston was dead, because "he had no pulse and looked pale".

The Dutch referee Charles Corver did not give a foul, let alone send Schumacher off. Schumacher then proceeded to take the goal-kick and play resumed. After winning the game, the goalkeeper caused more controversy when he was told that Battiston had lost two teeth, and replied: "If that's all that's wrong with him, I'll pay him the crowns."

Schumacher later apologised in person to Battiston, and the apology was accepted by Battiston. In his autobiography, Anpfiff, published a couple of years later, Schumacher said the reason he did not go over to check on Battiston's condition was because a number of French players were standing around Battiston and making threatening gestures in his direction.

Battiston recovered well from his injuries and returned to competition some time after.

== Private and later life ==
Battiston's paternal grandfather was Italian from Veneto. His uncle Raymond Battiston (1924–2006) played for FC Metz between 1945 and 1953. He has two sons.

After his retirement, Battiston joined the Bordeaux staff. He has held various positions, including sporting director, youth and reserve team coach and head of the youth academy. Under his leadership, the academy has produced players such as Marouane Chamakh, Rio Mavuba and Marc Planus.

== Honours ==
Saint-Étienne

- Division 1: 1980–81

Bordeaux

- Division 1: 1983–84, 1984–85, 1986–87
- Coupe de France: 1985–86
- Trophée des Champions: 1986

Monaco

- Division 1: 1987–88

France

- UEFA European Championship: 1984

Individual

- Onze Mondial: 1984, 1986
