= Uwe Krause =

German footballer

Personal information
- Date of birth: 13 October 1955 (age 71)
- Place of birth: Braunschweig, West Germany
- Height: 1.81 m (5 ft 11 in)
- Position: Striker

Senior career*
Years	Team	Apps	(Gls)
1977–1980	Eintracht Braunschweig	45	(7)
1980–1983	Laval	103	(55)
1983–1984	Monaco	38	(12)
1984–1986	Sochaux	73	(17)
1986–1989	FC Sète	93	(14)
Total		352	(105)
- * Club domestic league appearances and goals

Uwe Krause (born 13 October 1955) is a German former professional footballer who played as a striker. He spent most of his career in France.
