= Patrice Garande =

French footballer (born 1960)

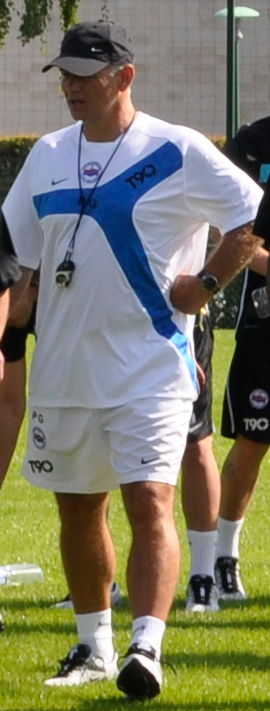
- Garande with Caen in 2011

Personal information
- Date of birth: 27 November 1960 (age 65)
- Place of birth: Oullins, France
- Height: 1.76 m (5 ft 9 in)
- Position: Striker

Youth career
- 1966–1968: CASCOL Oullins
- 1968–1973: J.S. Irigny
- 1973–1975: CASCOL Oullins
- 1975–1979: Saint-Étienne

Senior career*
Years	Team	Apps	(Gls)
1978	Saint-Étienne	3	(0)
1979–1980	Chênois	24	(9)
1980–1981	Orléans	33	(20)
1981–1986	Auxerre	151	(58)
1986–1987	Nantes	21	(4)
1987–1989	Saint-Étienne	72	(26)
1989–1990	Lens	14	(5)
1990–1991	Montpellier	20	(1)
1991–1992	Le Havre	20	(6)
1992–1993	Sochaux	27	(2)
1993–1994	Bourges	22	(10)
1994–1995	Orléans		
Total		407	(141)

International career
1988	France	1	(0)

Managerial career
- 1995–1998: Caen (assistant)
- 2000–2004: Cherbourg
- 2005–2012: Caen (assistant)
- 2012–2018: Caen
- 2020–2021: Toulouse
- 2021–2022: Dijon
Medal record
Men's football
Representing France
Gold medal – first place	1984 Los Angeles	Team competition
- * Club domestic league appearances and goals

Patrice Garande (born 27 November 1960) is a French former professional footballer who played as a striker, currently a manager.

== Playing career ==
=== Club ===
Born in Oullins, Rhône, Garande finished his development at AS Saint-Étienne, but appeared rarely for the first team during his tenure. In 1981, following a spell in the Swiss Super League with CS Chênois, he signed with AJ Auxerre, scoring a career-best 21 goals in the 1983–84 season to help them finish in third place in Ligue 1 and becoming top scorer in the process.

After leaving the Stade de l'Abbé-Deschamps in the summer of 1986, Garande went on to represent, in the French top division, FC Nantes, Saint-Étienne, Montpellier HSC, Le Havre AC and FC Sochaux-Montbéliard, eventually amassing competition totals of 314 matches and 97 goals. He retired at the age of 34, after a stint with amateurs US Orléans for which he had already played in Ligue 2.

=== International ===
Garande was part of the French Olympic team that won the gold medal at the 1984 Summer Olympics in Los Angeles. He won his only cap for the full side on 27 April 1988, in a 0–0 friendly away draw in Northern Ireland.

== Style of play ==
Garande was known for his intelligent movement as a forward, which made him difficult for opposing defenders to mark, with French former defender Lilian Thuram labelling him as one of his most difficult opponents throughout his career.

== Coaching career ==
In 1995, Garande joined Stade Malherbe Caen as assistant to Pierre Mankowski. He moved to AS Cherbourg Football in directorial capacities in January 1999, being named head coach the following year and achieving promotion to the Championnat National.

In June 2012, following Caen's relegation to the second division, Garande replaced fired Franck Dumas as manager. After a third place in the 2013–14 campaign and the subsequent promotion, the side managed to avoid relegation after a spectacular comeback, and his contract was renewed until 2017.

After again leading the club to top-flight survival, Garande left the Stade Michel d'Ornano in May 2018. Two years later, he was appointed at Toulouse FC who had just finished last in the abridged 2019–20 Ligue 1.

On 23 August 2021, Garande was hired by second-tier Dijon FCO.
