= 1973–74 French Division 1 =

36th season of French Division 1

Division 1
- Season: 1973–74
- Dates: 7 August 1973 – 25 May 1974
- Champions: Saint-Étienne (7th title)
- Relegated: Nancy; Paris FC; Sedan
- European Cup: Saint-Étienne
- Cup Winners' Cup: Monaco
- UEFA Cup: Nantes; Lyon
- Matches: 380
- Goals: 1,151 (3.03 per match)
- Top goalscorer: Carlos Bianchi (30 goals)

AS Saint-Etienne won the 1973–74 edition of the French Association Football League Division 1 season with 66 points.

== Participating teams ==
- Angers SCO
- SEC Bastia
- Bordeaux
- RC Lens
- Olympique Lyonnais
- Olympique de Marseille
- FC Metz
- AS Monaco
- AS Nancy
- FC Nantes
- OGC Nice
- Nîmes Olympique
- Paris FC
- Stade de Reims
- Stade Rennais FC
- AS Saint-Etienne
- CS Sedan
- FC Sochaux-Montbéliard
- RC Strasbourg
- Troyes AF
Location of teams in 1973–74 Division 1

== League table ==
Pos	Team	Pld	W	D	L	GF	GA	GD	BP	Pts	Qualification or relegation
1	Saint-Étienne (C)	38	23	9	6	74	40	+34	11	66	Qualification to European Cup first round
2	Nantes	38	19	9	10	63	41	+22	11	58	Qualification to UEFA Cup first round
3	Lyon	38	18	11	9	64	51	+13	8	55	Qualification to UEFA Cup first round
4	Angers	38	17	9	12	77	57	+20	11	54	
5	Nice	38	16	10	12	71	55	+16	12	54	
6	Reims	38	16	7	15	67	62	+5	11	50	
7	Sochaux	38	17	8	13	59	46	+13	7	49	
8	Strasbourg	38	13	11	14	62	67	−5	8	45	
9	Nîmes	38	13	15	10	41	37	+4	3	44	
10	Lens	38	14	8	16	58	65	−7	8	44	
11	Metz	38	14	7	17	53	53	0	8	43	
12	Marseille	38	13	9	16	58	62	−4	8	43	
13	Rennes	38	16	8	14	42	47	−5	3	43	
14	Bordeaux	38	11	12	15	55	57	−2	8	42	
15	Bastia	38	14	8	16	44	49	−5	5	41	
16	Monaco	38	11	11	16	64	73	−9	8	41	Qualification to Cup Winners' Cup first round (Note: Monaco qualified for 1974–75 European Cup Winners' Cup as runners-up of the 1973–74 Coupe de France as cup winners Saint-Étienne also won the league and qualified for the European Cup.)
17	Troyes	38	11	11	16	52	63	−11	8	41	
18	Nancy (R)	38	10	13	15	51	67	−16	8	41	Relegation to French Division 2
19	Paris FC (R)	38	9	9	20	54	79	−25	9	36	Relegation to French Division 2
20	Sedan (R)	38	8	9	21	42	80	−38	3	28	Relegation to French Division 2

Rules for classification: 1) points; 2) goal difference; 3) number of goals scored.
Victory: 2 points, Draw: 1 point, Defeat: 0 points, a bonus of 1 point for scoring three or more goals in a match
(C) Champions; (R) Relegated
Notes:

Promoted from Division 2, who will play in Division 1 season 1974/1975

- Lille: Champion of Division 2, winner of Division 2 group A
- Red Star Paris: Runner-up, winner of Division 2 group B
- Paris Saint-Germain FC: Third place, winner of barrages

== Results ==
Home \ Away	ANG	BAS	BOR	RCL	OL	OM	MET	ASM	NAL	NAN	NIC	NMS	PFC	REI	REN	STE	SED	SOC	RCS	TRO
Angers		1–2	4–3	3–1	1–0	3–0	2–1	2–2	1–0	2–3	4–1	1–2	1–1	3–1	0–1	4–0	4–0	2–4	3–3	6–1
Bastia	0–0		2–0	0–0	5–1	4–0	0–0	4–0	3–2	0–1	1–0	2–0	1–1	1–1	1–0	1–6	2–0	2–0	0–0	1–0
Bordeaux	0–2	3–1		1–1	3–0	0–0	3–1	1–2	1–1	2–1	4–0	1–1	6–1	3–0	0–1	0–5	2–1	1–1	2–2	4–1
Lens	1–1	3–1	0–1		1–1	2–3	2–1	2–1	1–0	0–1	2–0	0–1	3–2	2–1	3–0	2–3	4–2	1–1	3–1	0–0
Lyon	3–1	1–0	2–0	4–2		2–2	2–0	0–1	4–0	3–1	5–2	2–0	5–4	4–4	2–2	0–0	2–0	2–1	3–2	2–0
Marseille	2–2	2–1	3–1	5–2	1–1		3–1	0–2	2–2	3–0	2–0	1–2	3–0	1–0	2–1	0–2	4–0	1–1	6–1	2–3
Metz	0–1	3–0	1–0	1–0	0–2	1–0		3–2	3–3	1–1	2–0	1–1	4–0	1–0	4–0	5–1	4–1	3–2	2–0	1–1
Monaco	1–2	3–3	1–1	4–2	1–1	1–1	2–1		3–3	1–4	1–1	0–2	3–0	3–3	2–0	2–3	3–0	2–1	1–1	1–1
Nancy	0–3	2–0	0–2	3–2	3–1	0–0	2–1	2–1		1–0	0–1	1–1	1–1	2–2	1–2	1–1	4–1	0–1	3–1	0–0
Nantes	1–0	3–0	3–1	4–0	1–2	4–1	2–2	2–1	0–0		1–1	0–2	3–0	2–1	1–1	3–1	1–0	2–1	3–0	3–0
Nice	4–0	3–0	2–1	2–4	4–1	3–0	4–0	3–2	1–1	1–1		2–2	2–1	3–0	3–1	4–1	7–2	2–2	3–2	1–1
Nîmes	0–0	3–1	0–0	1–1	0–0	4–1	0–0	4–3	1–0	0–0	0–0		1–1	2–0	0–2	1–2	2–0	1–1	1–2	1–1
Paris FC	2–2	0–1	2–2	1–3	2–0	0–1	3–2	4–0	4–2	2–5	3–2	3–1		3–0	0–0	0–1	3–1	2–3	3–0	0–2
Reims	4–2	1–0	2–0	3–1	0–0	1–0	4–0	8–4	1–2	4–2	2–2	1–0	4–0		4–0	0–1	0–1	1–0	3–2	3–2
Rennes	1–2	1–2	4–2	0–1	1–0	3–1	1–0	1–1	3–0	0–0	1–0	1–2	1–0	2–0		1–0	1–1	0–2	2–1	2–1
Saint-Étienne	3–2	2–0	0–0	2–1	2–0	3–1	2–0	3–2	6–0	1–1	1–0	2–1	4–0	2–2	0–0		4–1	2–0	3–3	2–0
Sedan	0–4	1–0	2–2	1–1	1–1	3–1	1–2	0–2	2–3	0–1	2–0	2–0	2–2	4–1	1–1	0–0		1–1	2–1	4–3
Sochaux	4–2	1–0	4–1	2–3	1–1	2–0	1–0	1–0	4–1	2–0	0–1	0–1	2–1	1–2	4–1	0–2	3–0		1–0	2–0
Strasbourg	2–2	3–1	0–0	3–0	1–2	2–2	2–1	3–1	2–1	3–2	0–4	2–0	1–1	4–1	2–1	1–1	2–0	2–2		2–0
Troyes	3–2	1–1	3–1	4–1	1–2	2–1	2–0	0–2	4–4	1–0	2–2	0–0	4–1	0–2	1–2	1–0	2–2	3–0	1–3	

Legend: Blue = home team win; Yellow = draw; Red = away team win.

== Top goalscorers ==
Rank	Player	Club	Goals
1	(Argentina) Carlos Bianchi	Reims	30
2	(France) Marc Berdoll	Angers	29
3	(Luxembourg) Nico Braun	Metz	28
4	(Argentina) Delio Onnis	Monaco	26
5	(France) Gérard Tonnel	Troyes AF	21
6	(Socialist Federal Republic of Yugoslavia) Josip Skoblar	Marseille	20
6	(France) Hervé Revelli	Saint-Étienne	20
8	(Socialist Federal Republic of Yugoslavia) Božidar Antić	Angers	18
8	(France) Éric Edwige	Angers	18
8	(France) François Félix	Paris FC	18

== Attendances ==
#	Club	Average
1	Lens	17,731
2	Paris FC	16,444
3	Saint-Étienne	15,027
4	Marseille	14,685
5	Nantes	13,647
6	Reims	12,725
7	Strasbourg	12,241
8	Olympique lyonnais	12,069
9	Stade rennais	11,897
10	Nice	11,138
11	Troyes	10,293
12	Nancy	8,986
13	Angers	8,836
14	Metz	7,860
15	Nîmes	7,353
16	Girondins	6,847
17	Sochaux	6,093
18	Sedan	5,193
19	Bastia	4,091
20	Monaco	3,341
