= 1981–82 French Division 1 =

44th season of French Division 1

Division 1
- Season: 1981–82
- Champions: Monaco (4th title)
- Relegated: Valenciennes; Nice; Montpellier
- European Cup: Monaco
- Cup Winners' Cup: Paris Saint-Germain
- UEFA Cup: Saint-Étienne; Sochaux; Bordeaux
- Matches: 380
- Goals: 982 (2.58 per match)
- Top goalscorer: Delio Onnis (29)

AS Monaco won Division 1 season 1981/1982 of the French Association Football League with 55 points.

== Overview ==
Location of teams in 1981–82 Division 1

Twenty teams competed in the league – the top eighteen teams from the previous season, as well as two teams promoted from 1980–81 French Division 2. The competition was contested in a double round robin format, with each club playing every other club twice, for a total of 38 rounds. Two points were awarded for wins and one point for draws.

Team	Town	Region	Position in 1980–81
Auxerre	Auxerre	Burgundy	10th
Bastia	Bastia	Corsica	12th
Bordeaux	Bordeaux	Aquitaine	3rd
Brest	Brest	Brittany	1st in Division 2
Laval	Laval	Pays de la Loire	16th
Lens	Lens	Hauts-de-France	13th
Lille	Lille	Hauts-de-France	17th
Lyon	Lyon	Auvergne-Rhône-Alpes	6th
Metz	Metz	Lorraine	9th
Monaco	Monaco	Monaco	4th
Montpellier	Montpellier	Languedoc-Roussillon	2nd in Division 2
Nancy	Nancy	Lorraine	8th
Nantes	Nantes	Pays de la Loire	2nd
Nice	Nice	Provence-Alpes-Côte d'Azur	15th
Paris Saint-Germain	Paris	Île-de-France	5th
Saint-Étienne	Saint-Étienne	Auvergne-Rhône-Alpes	1st
Sochaux	Montbéliard	Franche-Comté	14th
Strasbourg	Strasbourg	Alsace	7th
Tours	Tours	Centre-Val de Loire	18th
Valenciennes	Valenciennes	Hauts-de-France	11th

== League table ==
Pos	Team	Pld	W	D	L	GF	GA	GD	Pts	Qualification or relegation
1	Monaco (C)	38	24	7	7	70	29	+41	55	Qualification to European Cup first round
2	Saint-Étienne	38	22	10	6	74	31	+43	54	Qualification to UEFA Cup first round
3	Sochaux	38	20	9	9	59	43	+16	49	Qualification to UEFA Cup first round
4	Bordeaux	38	19	10	9	55	45	+10	48	Qualification to UEFA Cup first round
5	Laval	38	16	12	10	49	40	+9	44	
6	Nantes	38	19	5	14	64	34	+30	43	
7	Paris Saint-Germain	38	17	9	12	58	45	+13	43	Qualification to Cup Winners' Cup first round
8	Nancy	38	13	13	12	50	52	−2	39	
9	Brest	38	14	10	14	48	57	−9	38	
10	Strasbourg	38	12	12	14	41	41	0	36	
11	Tours	38	14	7	17	61	59	+2	35	
12	Bastia	38	12	11	15	43	65	−22	35	
13	Lens	38	12	10	16	44	51	−7	34	
14	Lille	38	13	8	17	46	54	−8	34	
15	Auxerre	38	11	12	15	43	58	−15	34	
16	Lyon	38	13	6	19	38	46	−8	32	
17	Metz	38	8	16	14	35	49	−14	32	
18	Valenciennes (R)	38	10	10	18	40	59	−19	30	Qualification to relegation play-offs
19	Nice (R)	38	7	9	22	34	57	−23	23	Relegation to French Division 2
20	Montpellier (R)	38	7	8	23	30	67	−37	22	Relegation to French Division 2

Source: Histoire du PSG
Rules for classification: 1) points; 2) goal difference; 3) number of goals scored.
Victory: 2 points, Draw: 1 point, Defeat: 0 points
(C) Champions; (R) Relegated

Promoted from Division 2, who will play in Division 1 season 1982/1983

- Toulouse FC:Champion of Division 2, winner of Division 2 group A
- FC Rouen:Runner-up, winner of Division 2 group B
- FC Mulhouse:Third place, winner of barrages against US Valenciennes-Anzin

== Results ==
Home \ Away	AUX	BAS	BOR	BRS	LVL	RCL	LIL	OL	MET	ASM	MHS	NAL	NAN	NIC	PSG	STE	SOC	RCS	TFC	VAL
Auxerre		2–2	3–2	1–1	0–1	1–1	1–2	2–2	0–0	2–0	1–1	1–0	0–1	0–0	1–0	3–1	3–0	3–0	1–2	3–0
Bastia	0–1		4–4	3–1	2–2	1–0	3–2	1–0	1–1	1–0	1–0	3–3	1–0	1–1	3–1	1–1	1–1	1–0	2–1	1–0
Bordeaux	0–2	4–0		1–1	0–0	0–1	1–1	3–0	2–1	1–0	4–1	1–1	3–2	1–0	2–0	1–1	3–1	1–1	2–1	2–0
Brest	2–2	2–0	3–1		2–2	2–0	1–0	1–0	2–0	2–2	0–1	0–1	1–2	1–0	0–3	1–1	2–1	1–2	2–1	3–0
Laval	2–0	2–0	1–0	1–0		1–0	2–0	3–1	1–0	2–3	2–1	2–1	1–1	5–0	0–3	0–0	1–1	4–2	0–0	0–0
Lens	5–2	1–1	1–2	4–0	0–1		1–0	2–1	2–0	0–0	1–0	2–2	1–0	1–0	1–1	2–5	3–2	0–1	4–2	1–1
Lille	1–1	4–0	0–1	1–1	1–0	0–3		1–0	1–0	0–2	6–1	1–2	1–0	5–0	2–1	3–4	0–0	1–1	2–0	2–0
Lyon	0–1	4–1	0–1	1–0	0–0	3–0	4–1		3–1	0–2	2–0	2–0	1–0	1–0	2–3	0–1	1–0	1–1	2–1	3–0
Metz	1–0	2–0	1–1	1–1	1–1	0–0	1–0	1–0		0–0	4–0	1–2	0–0	1–0	1–1	0–0	1–1	0–0	4–2	1–1
Monaco	7–1	4–1	0–1	0–0	3–0	4–1	4–0	3–1	2–1		1–0	5–1	1–0	1–0	0–0	1–0	2–3	1–0	3–1	3–1
Montpellier	0–0	3–2	1–2	1–3	2–1	1–1	2–1	0–0	1–1	1–2		3–0	2–0	2–1	2–5	0–1	1–3	0–0	1–3	0–0
Nancy	1–1	2–1	0–0	5–0	2–2	0–0	1–1	2–1	2–2	0–3	3–2		1–0	4–0	0–0	0–0	0–0	3–0	2–0	1–3
Nantes	2–0	1–0	6–0	3–1	1–0	4–0	1–2	0–0	2–0	3–1	7–0	5–1		2–0	4–0	3–0	1–1	2–0	3–1	4–1
Nice	4–0	1–1	2–2	2–4	1–2	3–1	2–0	0–0	3–1	0–2	1–0	1–2	3–0		2–2	1–3	1–0	0–1	0–1	1–2
Paris SG	2–1	3–1	0–2	1–2	2–1	2–1	0–1	2–0	2–0	1–2	1–0	1–2	4–0	1–1		0–0	1–0	2–1	4–3	4–0
Saint-Étienne	3–0	3–0	5–0	1–0	1–1	3–1	1–1	4–0	9–2	2–0	4–0	2–1	1–0	2–0	0–0		0–1	2–0	1–0	5–1
Sochaux	5–0	3–0	2–1	0–0	3–1	1–0	1–1	3–1	2–1	1–4	1–0	1–0	2–1	2–1	2–1	2–1		2–2	4–1	2–0
Strasbourg	2–2	0–0	1–0	2–3	1–2	2–1	3–0	2–0	0–1	0–1	0–0	2–0	1–0	1–1	2–0	2–0	2–3		1–1	4–0
Tours	2–0	4–0	1–2	5–0	2–1	1–0	4–1	3–0	2–2	1–1	1–0	1–1	1–1	2–1	1–2	3–4	1–2	2–1		2–1
Valenciennes	3–1	1–2	0–1	5–2	3–1	1–1	4–0	0–1	2–0	0–0	1–0	2–1	1–2	0–0	2–2	0–2	3–0	0–0	1–1	

Legend: Blue = home team win; Yellow = draw; Red = away team win.

== Relegation play-offs ==
Team 1	Agg.	Team 2	1st leg	2nd leg
Mulhouse	6–3	Valenciennes	5–2	1–1

== Top goalscorers ==
Rank	Player	Club	Goals
1	(Argentina) Delio Onnis	Tours	29
2	(Poland) Andrzej Szarmach	Auxerre	24
3	(France) Michel Platini	Saint-Étienne	22
4	(Iceland) Teitur Thordarson	Lens	19
5	(West Germany) Uwe Krause	Laval	18
5	(Socialist Federal Republic of Yugoslavia) Drago Vabec	Brest	18
7	(France) Bernard Lacombe	Bordeaux	17
8	(Sweden) Ralf Edström	Monaco	15
8	(France) Yannick Stopyra	Sochaux	15
10	(France) Alain Giresse	Bordeaux	14
10	(Socialist Federal Republic of Yugoslavia) Simo Nikolić	Lyon	14

== Attendances ==
#	Club	Average
1	PSG	24,082
2	Saint-Étienne	16,239
3	Girondins	15,949
4	Nantes	13,240
5	Lyon	12,690
6	Tours	11,974
7	LOSC	11,009
8	Stade brestois	10,795
9	Lens	9,815
10	Stade lavallois	9,690
11	Strasbourg	9,322
12	Metz	8,801
13	MHSC	7,614
14	AJA	7,538
15	Sochaux	7,472
16	Nancy	7,469
17	Nice	6,810
18	Valenciennes	5,177
19	Monaco	4,394
20	Bastia	2,833
