= 1974–75 French Division 1 =

37th season of French Division 1

Division 1
- Season: 1974–75
- Dates: 2 August 1974 – 3 June 1975
- Champions: Saint-Étienne (8th title)
- Relegated: Angers; Rennes; Red Star
- European Cup: Saint-Étienne
- Cup Winners' Cup: Lens
- UEFA Cup: Marseille; Lyon
- Matches: 380
- Goals: 1,075 (2.83 per match)
- Top goalscorer: Delio Onnis (30 goals)

AS Saint-Etienne won Division 1 season 1974/1975 of the French Association Football League with 58 points.

== Participating teams ==
- Angers SCO
- SEC Bastia
- Bordeaux
- RC Lens
- Lille
- Olympique Lyonnais
- Olympique de Marseille
- FC Metz
- AS Monaco
- FC Nantes
- OGC Nice
- Nîmes Olympique
- Paris Saint-Germain FC
- Red Star Paris
- Stade de Reims
- Stade Rennais FC
- AS Saint-Etienne
- FC Sochaux-Montbéliard
- RC Strasbourg
- Troyes AF
Location of teams in 1974–75 Division 1

== League table ==
Pos	Team	Pld	W	D	L	GF	GA	GD	BP	Pts	Qualification or relegation
1	Saint-Étienne (C)	38	23	6	9	70	39	+31	6	58	Qualification to European Cup first round
2	Marseille	38	18	9	11	65	45	+20	4	49	Qualification to UEFA Cup first round
3	Lyon	38	16	11	11	64	53	+11	5	48	Qualification to UEFA Cup first round
4	Nîmes	38	16	11	11	56	49	+7	4	47	
5	Nantes	38	16	11	11	50	42	+8	2	45	
6	Bastia	38	15	11	12	54	47	+7	4	45	
7	Lens	38	16	8	14	59	59	0	4	44	Qualification to Cup Winners' Cup first round (Note: Lens qualified for 1975–76 European Cup Winners' Cup as runners-up of the 1974–75 Coupe de France as cup winners Saint-Étienne also won the league and qualified for the European Cup.)
8	Metz	38	15	10	13	54	56	−2	4	44	
9	Strasbourg	38	16	8	14	49	56	−7	3	43	
10	Monaco	38	18	4	16	64	68	−4	2	42	
11	Reims	38	15	8	15	57	57	0	3	41	
12	Bordeaux	38	15	7	16	48	49	−1	2	39	
13	Lille	38	15	5	18	53	56	−3	4	39	
14	Nice	38	13	10	15	59	63	−4	3	39	
15	Paris Saint-Germain	38	12	12	14	57	65	−8	1	37	
16	Troyes	38	12	10	16	46	55	−9	3	37	
17	Sochaux	38	11	10	17	41	49	−8	2	34	
18	Angers (R)	38	9	10	19	48	60	−12	5	33	Relegation to French Division 2
19	Rennes (R)	38	10	11	17	38	52	−14	2	33	Relegation to French Division 2
20	Red Star (R)	38	7	12	19	43	55	−12	3	29	Relegation to French Division 2

Source: Histoire du PSG
Rules for classification: 1) points; 2) goal difference; 3) number of goals scored.
Victory: 2 points, Draw: 1 point, Defeat: 0 points, a bonus of 1 point for winning by three or more goals in a match
(C) Champions; (R) Relegated
Notes:

Promoted from Division 2, who will play in Division 1 season 1975/1976

- AS Nancy: Champion of Division 2, winner of Division 2 group B
- US Valenciennes-Anzin: Runner-up, winner of Division 2 group A
- Olympique Avignonnais: Third place, winner of barrages

== Results ==
Home \ Away	ANG	BAS	BOR	RCL	LIL	OL	OM	MET	ASM	NAN	NIC	NMS	PSG	RS	REI	REN	STE	SOC	RC<S	TRO
Angers		3–0	2–2	1–2	4–1	0–2	1–2	2–2	2–1	0–0	1–3	2–0	3–1	1–1	1–2	1–2	0–1	1–1	5–1	1–1
Bastia	3–0		1–0	0–0	2–0	2–0	2–2	0–0	1–0	1–0	2–0	4–0	0–2	2–0	0–1	3–0	1–1	4–2	2–1	5–1
Bordeaux	1–1	1–0		2–0	4–2	1–1	1–0	3–2	0–0	2–1	2–0	0–1	1–2	2–1	2–0	1–0	1–0	2–1	4–1	6–0
Lens	0–0	3–3	3–0		1–0	4–0	2–2	3–1	6–3	2–2	4–2	3–0	3–2	0–0	1–0	1–0	3–1	3–2	0–1	1–0
Lille	1–5	0–0	2–0	1–1		1–2	1–0	4–0	2–0	3–0	4–2	1–1	5–0	1–0	2–1	1–0	2–0	4–0	2–1	2–0
Lyon	0–0	8–1	1–0	5–1	5–1		0–1	2–0	1–3	1–1	0–0	2–2	4–4	2–1	3–3	4–1	1–0	1–0	4–1	2–1
Marseille	3–1	3–1	3–0	4–0	2–0	0–1		1–0	4–1	2–1	4–1	1–1	4–2	3–2	1–1	3–1	1–2	2–0	1–1	0–0
Metz	2–0	0–2	3–3	2–1	2–1	3–1	1–0		1–0	4–0	2–2	3–0	1–3	2–1	1–1	5–2	3–0	0–1	2–1	1–1
Monaco	1–0	1–0	2–0	3–0	1–0	3–1	0–2	1–2		1–3	3–2	3–3	3–0	4–3	2–3	2–0	3–1	3–1	1–0	3–1
Nantes	1–0	0–0	3–0	2–1	1–0	3–1	2–0	0–2	4–2		2–0	0–1	0–0	0–0	0–1	1–1	2–1	1–0	3–1	4–1
Nice	4–1	2–1	0–0	2–1	2–1	2–2	1–3	1–0	2–3	2–2		2–0	4–2	2–1	0–0	4–1	1–1	5–1	2–1	2–1
Nîmes	4–0	3–3	2–1	3–1	2–1	1–2	3–1	2–0	3–0	0–2	2–1		2–1	3–0	2–0	0–0	0–0	1–0	6–0	2–2
Paris SG	3–2	1–1	1–0	3–1	0–0	2–2	1–1	2–2	0–1	2–3	2–1	1–1		2–0	3–0	2–1	2–2	0–1	1–1	0–0
Red Star	2–5	0–0	1–2	1–1	2–1	4–0	0–0	1–1	3–0	4–4	4–1	0–1	1–1		2–1	0–2	1–2	0–1	0–1	2–1
Reims	1–1	0–1	2–1	5–1	4–3	0–2	4–3	1–2	2–3	2–1	1–1	2–1	6–1	1–1		2–1	0–2	2–1	2–0	3–0
Rennes	2–0	1–1	1–1	1–0	3–0	0–0	1–0	0–0	1–1	0–0	0–0	2–1	2–1	0–2	2–2		3–1	0–1	5–1	1–1
Saint-Étienne	2–0	3–2	2–0	3–2	4–1	1–0	4–1	5–0	3–2	2–0	2–0	4–0	3–2	2–0	3–1	3–0		1–0	2–1	5–1
Sochaux	0–1	3–0	5–2	0–1	1–1	3–1	1–1	1–1	4–2	0–1	1–1	2–0	0–1	0–0	1–0	2–1	1–1		0–0	0–1
Strasbourg	1–0	3–2	1–0	2–1	3–0	2–0	3–2	3–0	2–2	2–0	2–1	1–1	2–1	1–1	3–0	2–0	0–0	1–1		1–0
Troyes	4–0	2–1	1–0	0–1	0–1	0–0	1–2	4–1	5–0	0–0	3–1	1–1	1–3	2–1	2–0	2–0	1–0	2–2	2–0	

Legend: Blue = home team win; Yellow = draw; Red = away team win.

== Top goalscorers ==
Rank	Player	Club	Goals
1	(Argentina) Delio Onnis	Monaco	30
2	(Republic of the Congo) François M'Pelé	Paris Saint-Germain	21
3	(Argentina) Hugo Curioni	Nantes/Metz	19
4	(France) Marc Berdoll	Angers	17
4	(Luxembourg) Nico Braun	Metz	17
4	(France) Bernard Lacombe	Lyon	17
4	(France) Gérard Tonnel	Troyes AF	17
8	(Socialist Federal Republic of Yugoslavia) Božidar Antić	Angers	16
8	(France) Christian Coste	Lille	16
8	(Brazil) Paulo César Lima	Marseille	16

== Attendances ==
#	Club	Average
1	Marseille	24,033
2	PSG	17,167
3	Lens	15,422
4	Saint-Étienne	13,970
5	Nantes	13,739
6	Reims	12,233
7	LOSC	11,802
8	Stade rennais	11,301
9	Metz	10,995
10	Strasbourg	10,864
11	Girondins	10,290
12	Olympique lyonnais	9,939
13	Troyes	9,847
14	Nice	9,578
15	Red Star	8,994
16	Nîmes	8,028
17	Angers	6,418
18	Sochaux	5,975
19	Bastia	5,128
20	Monaco	2,989
