= 1979–80 French Division 1 =

42nd season of French Division 1

Division 1
- Season: 1979–80
- Dates: 26 July 1979 – 27 May 1980
- Champions: Nantes (5th title)
- Relegated: Marseille; Brest
- European Cup: Nantes
- UEFA Cup: Sochaux; Saint-Étienne
- Cup Winners' Cup: Monaco
- Matches: 380
- Goals: 1,073 (2.82 per match)
- Top goalscorer: Erwin Kostedde (21); Delio Onnis (21)

FC Nantes won Division 1 season 1979/1980 of the French Association Football League with 57 points.

== Participating teams ==
- Angers SCO
- SEC Bastia
- Bordeaux
- Stade Brest
- Stade Lavallois
- RC Lens
- Lille
- Olympique Lyonnais
- Olympique de Marseille
- FC Metz
- AS Monaco
- AS Nancy
- FC Nantes Atlantique
- OGC Nice
- Nîmes Olympique
- Paris Saint-Germain FC
- AS Saint-Etienne
- FC Sochaux
- RC Strasbourg
- US Valenciennes-Anzin
Location of teams in 1979–80 Division 1

== League table ==
Pos	Team	Pld	W	D	L	GF	GA	GD	Pts	Qualification or relegation
1	Nantes (C)	38	26	5	7	76	30	+46	57	Qualification to European Cup first round
2	Sochaux	38	24	6	8	76	36	+40	54	Qualification to UEFA Cup first round
3	Saint-Étienne	38	23	8	7	73	50	+23	54	Qualification to UEFA Cup first round
4	Monaco	38	21	8	9	61	30	+31	50	Qualification to Cup Winners' Cup first round (Note: Monaco qualified for the 1980–81 European Cup Winners' Cup as winners of the 1979–80 Coupe de France.)
5	Strasbourg	38	17	9	12	58	50	+8	43	
6	Bordeaux	38	16	8	14	64	53	+11	40	
7	Paris Saint-Germain	38	15	10	13	59	52	+7	40	
8	Valenciennes	38	14	12	12	47	47	0	40	
9	Lens	38	14	10	14	51	51	0	38	
10	Nîmes	38	15	8	15	45	50	−5	38	
11	Nancy	38	15	7	16	55	61	−6	37	
12	Laval	38	15	5	18	57	55	+2	35	
13	Lille	38	12	11	15	45	49	−4	35	
14	Angers	38	14	7	17	45	55	−10	35	
15	Nice	38	13	6	19	53	62	−9	32	
16	Bastia	38	14	4	20	39	51	−12	32	
17	Metz	38	12	8	18	45	60	−15	32	
18	Lyon (O)	38	10	9	19	43	65	−22	29	Qualification to relegation play-offs
19	Marseille (R)	38	9	6	23	45	78	−33	24	Relegation to French Division 2
20	Brest (R)	38	4	7	27	35	87	−52	15	Relegation to French Division 2

Source: Histoire du PSG
Rules for classification: 1) points; 2) goal difference; 3) number of goals scored.
Victory: 2 points, Draw: 1 point, Defeat: 0 points
(C) Champions; (O) Play-off winners; (R) Relegated
Notes:

Promoted from Division 2, who will play in Division 1 season 1980/1981

- Auxerre: Champion of Division 2, winner of Division 2 group B
- FC Tours: Runner-up, winner of Division 2 group A

== Results ==
Home \ Away	ANG	BAS	BOR	BRS	LVL	RCL	LIL	OL	OM	MET	ASM	NAL	NAN	NIC	NMS	PSG	STE	SOC	RCS	VAL
Angers		3–1	3–0	2–0	3–1	2–1	2–0	1–1	3–1	2–0	1–4	1–0	0–1	2–3	0–1	1–2	0–2	1–3	1–0	2–1
Bastia	1–1		2–1	1–0	2–1	1–2	4–0	2–0	2–0	0–1	2–0	2–2	1–0	3–0	2–0	1–0	0–1	0–1	2–1	2–1
Bordeaux	2–1	2–1		4–1	4–1	1–1	1–1	3–0	2–0	1–3	3–1	4–1	1–3	3–1	2–1	0–1	5–1	2–3	1–3	7–0
Brest	0–1	3–0	0–1		2–2	0–0	1–1	5–1	7–2	1–3	1–2	3–3	0–1	1–0	2–2	0–4	0–2	1–2	2–5	1–5
Laval	3–2	3–0	1–0	3–0		0–0	2–0	1–2	3–0	3–2	0–2	0–1	0–2	3–0	3–1	3–1	2–3	3–3	0–0	3–0
Lens	2–0	2–0	2–1	3–0	1–0		5–3	1–1	4–1	4–1	0–3	4–0	1–3	0–1	1–0	1–1	4–3	2–0	1–1	1–1
Lille	0–0	2–0	0–1	1–0	2–0	0–0		1–0	1–1	3–0	3–1	2–0	1–1	4–3	4–0	4–2	0–2	1–1	2–0	0–1
Lyon	0–1	1–1	1–1	3–0	2–0	1–1	4–2		1–0	1–0	0–1	2–1	1–2	2–2	2–1	1–1	0–0	3–1	0–2	3–1
Marseille	3–1	2–1	1–1	3–0	0–2	3–1	2–0	3–1		1–0	0–3	2–2	0–1	3–1	0–1	0–2	3–5	1–1	1–3	3–6
Metz	0–1	0–2	1–1	0–0	1–4	2–1	2–0	5–2	3–2		0–0	2–1	0–0	2–0	0–0	5–2	1–2	0–0	0–0	1–0
Monaco	3–0	1–0	0–0	4–0	2–1	2–0	0–1	4–0	1–0	3–0		3–0	2–1	2–1	0–0	2–2	2–1	0–1	4–1	0–1
Nancy	1–0	3–1	3–1	5–1	2–1	1–1	1–0	1–0	5–0	0–1	2–1		0–2	1–2	1–0	3–2	1–1	1–2	3–4	1–0
Nantes	3–1	1–0	4–1	3–0	4–1	3–0	1–0	3–0	4–1	4–1	0–0	2–0		5–0	4–1	4–2	2–0	3–2	2–1	0–0
Nice	0–0	2–1	0–0	3–0	0–1	1–0	0–0	3–1	0–3	4–2	1–2	1–1	1–2		1–2	3–0	2–4	1–2	6–1	2–0
Nîmes	1–1	2–0	2–0	2–0	2–0	3–1	3–2	3–2	0–0	2–1	1–1	4–2	2–1	0–1		2–0	0–1	2–0	0–0	1–1
Paris SG	1–1	1–1	0–1	0–0	3–1	3–0	2–2	2–1	2–1	2–0	2–1	1–2	1–0	2–2	4–0		2–2	3–1	1–0	3–0
Saint-Étienne	3–3	2–0	3–3	2–1	3–1	3–1	0–0	2–0	3–1	2–1	2–1	2–2	4–2	2–1	3–1	2–0		2–1	2–1	0–1
Sochaux	4–0	3–0	2–0	7–0	2–0	3–0	3–0	3–1	3–0	4–0	1–2	5–1	1–0	2–1	2–1	1–0	4–1		1–1	0–1
Strasbourg	4–0	1–0	4–0	2–1	0–3	0–1	3–2	3–1	1–1	3–2	1–1	1–0	2–2	2–3	1–0	2–1	1–0	0–1		2–1
Valenciennes	2–1	5–0	0–3	2–1	1–1	3–1	0–0	1–1	1–0	2–2	0–0	0–1	1–0	1–0	4–1	1–1	0–0	1–1	1–1	

Legend: Blue = home team win; Yellow = draw; Red = away team win.

== Relegation play-offs ==
Team 1	Agg.	Team 2	1st leg	2nd leg
Lyon	8–4	Avignon	6–0	2–4

== Top goalscorers ==
Rank	Player	Club	Goals
1	(West Germany) Erwin Kostedde	Laval	21
1	(Argentina) Delio Onnis	Monaco	21
3	(France) Pierre Pleimelding	Lille	18
4	(Socialist Federal Republic of Yugoslavia) Drago Vabec	Brest	17
5	(France) Michel Platini	Saint-Étienne	16
6	(France) Yves Ehrlacher	Lens	15
6	(Socialist Federal Republic of Yugoslavia) Nenad Bjeković	Nice	15
6	(Netherlands) Johnny Rep	Saint-Étienne	15
6	(France) Bernard Genghini	Sochaux	15
10	(France) Yannick Stopyra	Sochaux	14

== Attendances ==
#	Club	Average
1	PSG	21,361
2	Saint-Étienne	19,664
3	Nantes	16,422
4	Lens	15,100
5	Marseille	13,838
6	Strasbourg	13,768
7	LOSC	13,314
8	Metz	9,734
9	Stade lavallois	9,278
10	Girondins	8,932
11	Lyon	8,899
12	Stade brestois	8,296
13	Nice	8,248
14	Nancy	8,138
15	Angers	7,788
16	Valenciennes	7,655
17	Nîmes	7,526
18	Sochaux	7,007
19	Monaco	4,265
20	Bastia	3,275
