= 1980–81 French Division 1 =

43rd season of French Division 1

Division 1
- Season: 1980–81
- Dates: 24 July 1980 – 2 June 1981
- Champions: Saint-Étienne (10th title)
- Relegated: Nîmes; Angers
- European Cup: Saint-Étienne
- UEFA Cup: Nantes; Bordeaux; Monaco
- Cup Winners' Cup: Bastia
- Matches: 380
- Goals: 1,064 (2.8 per match)
- Top goalscorer: Delio Onnis (24 goals)

1980–81 Division 1 was the 43rd season of the French top association football league, played from July 1980 to June 1981. The league was won by AS Saint-Etienne with 57 points, for whom this was their 10th title.

== Participating teams ==
- Angers SCO
- Auxerre
- SEC Bastia
- Bordeaux
- Stade Lavallois
- RC Lens
- Lille
- Olympique Lyonnais
- FC Metz
- AS Monaco
- AS Nancy
- FC Nantes Atlantique
- OGC Nice
- Nîmes Olympique
- Paris Saint-Germain FC
- AS Saint-Etienne
- FC Sochaux
- RC Strasbourg
- FC Tours
- US Valenciennes-Anzin
Location of teams in 1980–81 Division 1

== League table ==
Pos	Team	Pld	W	D	L	GF	GA	GD	Pts	Qualification or relegation
1	Saint-Étienne (C)	38	23	11	4	68	26	+42	57	Qualification to European Cup first round
2	Nantes	38	22	11	5	74	36	+38	55	Qualification to UEFA Cup first round
3	Bordeaux	38	18	13	7	57	34	+23	49	Qualification to UEFA Cup first round
4	Monaco	38	19	11	8	58	41	+17	49	Qualification to UEFA Cup first round
5	Paris Saint-Germain	38	17	12	9	62	50	+12	46	
6	Lyon	38	14	13	11	70	54	+16	41	
7	Strasbourg	38	14	12	12	44	47	−3	40	
8	Nancy	38	15	7	16	55	49	+6	37	
9	Metz	38	10	16	12	48	53	−5	36	
10	Auxerre	38	10	16	12	46	52	−6	36	
11	Valenciennes	38	12	12	14	51	70	−19	36	
12	Bastia	38	13	9	16	50	55	−5	35	Qualification to Cup Winners' Cup first round (Note: Bastia qualified for the 1981–82 European Cup Winners' Cup as winners of the 1980–81 Coupe de France.)
13	Lens	38	10	14	14	46	48	−2	34	
14	Sochaux	38	10	14	14	51	59	−8	34	
15	Nice	38	10	12	16	47	61	−14	32	
16	Laval	38	10	11	17	49	55	−6	31	
17	Lille	38	10	11	17	55	71	−16	31	
18	Tours (O)	38	9	13	16	54	71	−17	31	Qualification to relegation play-offs
19	Nîmes (R)	38	6	14	18	46	66	−20	26	Relegation to French Division 2
20	Angers (R)	38	5	14	19	33	66	−33	24	Relegation to French Division 2

Source: Histoire du PSG
Rules for classification: 1) points; 2) goal difference; 3) number of goals scored.
Victory: 2 points, Draw: 1 point, Defeat: 0 points
(C) Champions; (O) Play-off winners; (R) Relegated
Notes:

Promoted from Division 2, who will play in Division 1 season 1981/1982

- Stade Brest:Champion of Division 2, winner of Division 2 group B
- Montpellier HSC:Runner-up, winner of Division 2 group A

== Results ==
Home \ Away	ANG	AUX	BAS	BOR	LVL	RCL	LIL	OL	MET	ASM	NAL	NAN	NIC	NMS	PSG	STE	SOC	RCS	TFC	VAL
Angers		4–1	1–0	0–3	2–0	1–2	3–2	1–3	0–0	1–1	2–0	0–3	1–1	1–2	1–1	1–1	1–2	0–0	2–2	1–1
Auxerre	2–2		0–0	1–2	1–0	1–1	2–2	2–2	4–2	0–0	0–2	0–0	3–1	4–2	0–1	0–2	1–1	1–1	3–2	1–1
Bastia	3–0	2–0		3–2	2–2	3–1	5–1	2–0	1–0	1–1	2–1	1–2	3–0	3–2	2–0	2–1	1–1	2–0	0–1	1–1
Bordeaux	1–0	2–0	0–0		2–1	5–1	2–0	3–2	1–1	1–0	2–0	0–0	3–0	1–1	1–3	3–0	0–0	2–1	1–1	4–0
Laval	2–0	0–0	3–0	2–4		3–0	4–2	0–0	1–1	3–3	1–0	2–0	0–1	4–0	0–0	0–0	0–0	3–1	2–0	2–1
Lens	1–0	1–1	5–0	0–1	3–0		0–0	2–2	2–2	0–0	0–0	0–0	2–0	1–1	2–3	1–1	5–1	1–2	3–0	1–2
Lille	4–0	2–3	3–1	2–2	1–1	2–1		1–1	0–1	2–1	0–0	0–3	3–1	0–0	2–2	1–3	2–1	3–0	1–1	1–2
Lyon	5–1	1–3	2–1	1–0	1–0	4–1	2–2		0–0	3–2	4–2	0–0	5–1	4–2	2–0	1–1	5–1	0–0	2–3	1–1
Metz	1–0	2–2	1–0	1–1	3–2	0–2	3–0	0–2		1–1	2–0	2–2	0–1	2–1	0–0	0–0	4–2	4–1	2–3	4–2
Monaco	2–0	2–1	3–0	0–0	3–0	1–0	1–2	2–1	2–1		1–0	2–1	1–0	2–1	4–0	1–2	2–1	3–1	1–1	5–1
Nancy	2–0	3–0	3–0	2–0	3–0	1–2	2–0	3–1	2–0	2–3		1–0	3–2	2–0	2–2	0–0	2–2	2–0	1–3	7–1
Nantes	3–1	0–1	2–1	1–0	4–1	2–0	4–1	2–1	1–0	5–0	3–0		4–1	1–1	1–1	1–1	2–1	1–1	4–3	3–0
Nice	2–2	0–0	2–1	1–1	2–1	1–1	1–2	3–2	0–0	2–1	2–2	3–2		0–0	1–1	0–1	4–2	0–0	2–2	4–0
Nîmes	0–0	0–0	3–2	0–2	2–2	1–1	2–1	1–2	3–3	1–3	1–2	2–3	1–3		2–1	0–1	0–0	4–2	2–1	1–1
Paris SG	2–2	2–3	3–1	4–0	3–2	3–0	4–1	1–1	1–1	0–0	2–1	0–2	3–1	3–2		1–1	3–2	1–0	4–1	3–2
Saint-Étienne	5–0	2–0	3–0	2–1	1–0	0–0	3–1	3–2	3–0	5–1	4–1	0–0	3–2	0–0	0–2		3–0	3–0	1–2	4–0
Sochaux	2–0	1–1	1–0	0–0	2–1	1–2	3–0	2–2	3–0	1–1	1–1	2–4	1–1	2–1	4–0	1–2		1–1	1–0	3–3
Strasbourg	2–0	1–0	1–1	1–1	0–0	1–0	3–2	2–1	3–3	0–0	2–0	1–2	2–1	1–0	1–0	0–2	2–0		4–1	3–0
Tours	2–2	1–4	2–2	0–1	3–2	1–1	3–3	1–1	1–1	0–1	1–0	2–3	1–0	4–3	0–2	1–3	0–1	1–1		2–3
Valenciennes	0–0	2–0	1–1	2–2	4–2	1–0	0–3	2–1	3–0	0–1	3–0	3–3	1–0	1–1	2–0	0–1	2–1	1–2	1–1	

Legend: Blue = home team win; Yellow = draw; Red = away team win.

== Relegation play-offs ==
Team 1	Agg.	Team 2	1st leg	2nd leg
Tours	3–2	Toulouse	1–0	2–2

== Top goalscorers ==
Rank	Player	Club	Goals
1	(Argentina) Delio Onnis	Tours	24
2	(West Germany) Uwe Krause	Laval	23
3	(Socialist Federal Republic of Yugoslavia) Simo Nikolić	Lyon	21
4	(France) Michel Platini	Saint-Étienne	20
5	(France) Bernard Lacombe	Bordeaux	18
5	(Argentina) Victor Trossero	Monaco	18
7	(France) Dominique Rocheteau	Paris Saint-Germain	16
7	(Poland) Andrzej Szarmach	Auxerre	16
7	(France) Bernard Zénier	Nancy	16
10	(France) Albert Gemmrich	Bordeaux	14
10	(Israel) Vicky Peretz	Strasbourg	14
10	(Netherlands) Johnny Rep	Saint-Étienne	14
10	(France) Olivier Rouyer	Nancy	14

== Attendances ==
#	Club	Average
1	PSG	23,329
2	Saint-Étienne	18,524
3	Lyon	17,441
4	Nantes	15,241
5	Tours	11,676
6	Girondins	11,397
7	Lens	11,385
8	LOSC	10,104
9	Metz	9,460
10	Strasbourg	8,607
11	AJA	8,450
12	Nice	7,691
13	Nancy	7,614
14	Stade lavallois	7,590
15	Sochaux	5,788
16	Valenciennes	5,558
17	Nîmes	5,183
18	Angers	4,664
19	Monaco	3,745
20	Bastia	2,971
