= 1983–84 French Division 1 =

46th season of French Division 1

Division 1
- Season: 1983–84
- Champions: Bordeaux (2nd title)
- Relegated: Saint-Étienne; Nîmes; Rennes
- European Cup: Bordeaux
- Cup Winners' Cup: Metz
- UEFA Cup: Monaco; Auxerre; Paris Saint-Germain
- Matches: 380
- Goals: 911 (2.4 per match)
- Top goalscorer: Patrice Garande (21); Delio Onnis (21)

Girondins de Bordeaux won Division 1 season 1983/1984 of the French Association Football League with 54 points.

== Participating teams ==
- Auxerre
- SEC Bastia
- Bordeaux
- Stade Brest
- Stade Lavallois
- RC Lens
- Lille
- FC Metz
- AS Monaco
- AS Nancy
- FC Nantes Atlantique
- Nîmes Olympique
- Paris Saint-Germain FC
- Stade Rennais
- FC Rouen
- AS Saint-Etienne
- FC Sochaux
- RC Strasbourg
- Sporting Toulon Var
- Toulouse FC
Location of teams in 1983–84 Division 1

== League table ==
Pos	Team	Pld	W	D	L	GF	GA	GD	Pts	Qualification or relegation
1	Bordeaux (C)	38	23	8	7	72	33	+39	54	Qualification to European Cup first round
2	Monaco	38	22	10	6	58	29	+29	54	Qualification to UEFA Cup first round
3	Auxerre	38	21	7	10	59	33	+26	49	Qualification to UEFA Cup first round
4	Paris Saint-Germain	38	18	11	9	56	37	+19	47	Qualification to UEFA Cup first round
5	Toulouse	38	19	7	12	57	41	+16	45	
6	Nantes	38	18	9	11	46	32	+14	45	
7	Sochaux	38	14	13	11	46	34	+12	41	
8	Strasbourg	38	11	17	10	36	38	−2	39	
9	Lille	38	13	11	14	49	49	0	37	
10	Bastia	38	14	8	16	36	43	−7	36	
11	Laval	38	12	12	14	29	36	−7	36	
12	Metz	38	13	9	16	49	53	−4	35	Qualification to Cup Winners' Cup first round (Note: Metz qualified for 1984–85 European Cup Winners' Cup as winners of the 1983–84 Coupe de France.)
13	Lens	38	14	7	17	57	66	−9	35	
14	Rouen	38	13	8	17	42	40	+2	34	
15	Nancy	38	10	12	16	38	53	−15	32	
16	Toulon	38	12	8	18	39	60	−21	32	
17	Brest	38	9	13	16	36	47	−11	31	
18	Saint-Étienne (R)	38	11	8	19	31	52	−21	30	Qualification to relegation play-offs
19	Nîmes (R)	38	6	13	19	36	70	−34	25	Relegation to French Division 2
20	Rennes (R)	38	8	7	23	39	65	−26	23	Relegation to French Division 2

Source: Histoire du PSG
Rules for classification: 1) points; 2) goal difference; 3) number of goals scored.
Victory: 2 points, Draw: 1 point, Defeat: 0 points
(C) Champions; (R) Relegated
Notes:

Promoted from Division 2, who will play in Division 1 season 1984/1985

- Tours FC:Champion of Division 2, winner of Division 2 group B
- Olympique Marseille:Runner-up, winner of Division 2 group A
- RC Paris:Third place

== Results ==
Home \ Away	AUX	BAS	BOR	BRE	LAV	RCL	LIL	MET	ASM	NAL	FCN	NMS	PSG	REN	ROU	STE	SOC	RCS	SCT	TFC
Auxerre		1–1	1–4	5–0	3–0	4–0	2–0	6–1	0–0	4–0	1–0	0–0	1–2	1–0	1–0	1–0	2–0	3–0	1–1	1–1
Bastia	1–0		1–3	2–1	3–0	2–2	1–0	1–0	0–1	0–1	1–0	1–1	1–1	2–1	0–0	2–1	0–2	4–2	1–0	3–2
Bordeaux	4–1	2–1		1–1	0–0	3–2	5–2	1–1	0–2	2–1	1–0	4–0	2–1	4–1	3–1	7–0	3–0	2–0	1–0	0–0
Brest	2–0	3–0	0–0		1–0	2–1	1–1	0–2	0–1	1–1	0–1	2–0	2–2	1–1	1–0	3–2	0–0	0–0	5–2	0–1
Laval	1–0	1–0	0–1	2–1		3–0	3–1	1–0	2–0	1–1	0–1	1–0	2–0	2–0	0–0	1–1	1–1	1–1	0–2	1–0
Lens	1–3	1–0	3–1	3–2	2–1		4–2	3–2	3–1	3–1	2–2	0–0	0–3	0–1	4–2	2–1	1–0	2–2	5–1	0–1
Lille	1–2	0–0	1–1	2–1	1–0	3–1		2–0	1–1	2–0	2–0	1–0	1–0	2–0	0–1	1–1	1–2	1–1	4–2	0–0
Metz	1–2	1–0	0–0	1–0	0–0	3–0	1–0		0–4	1–2	2–1	2–1	1–1	6–0	1–1	1–0	3–1	0–1	2–0	1–3
Monaco	0–1	1–0	2–1	2–0	3–0	3–1	1–1	2–2		1–1	3–0	5–1	0–1	3–2	1–0	3–1	1–1	1–0	1–0	2–3
Nancy	0–1	1–3	0–2	1–1	0–0	2–0	1–2	2–1	1–1		0–1	2–1	1–2	1–3	2–0	2–0	0–0	3–2	2–2	2–0
Nantes	1–2	1–0	0–1	4–0	3–1	0–0	2–1	2–1	0–0	2–1		4–0	3–1	3–1	3–0	1–0	1–1	1–1	1–0	3–1
Nîmes	1–1	0–0	1–2	2–2	3–0	2–1	2–2	3–7	1–2	1–1	1–0		1–1	1–1	2–1	1–1	2–2	0–3	1–0	3–0
Paris SG	1–2	1–0	2–1	1–1	0–0	3–0	4–5	2–0	0–1	1–1	0–0	0–0		3–2	2–0	3–1	3–1	2–0	5–1	1–0
Rennes	1–3	4–1	0–2	1–1	1–1	1–1	0–0	1–2	1–2	2–1	1–2	2–1	0–1		2–1	1–2	0–1	3–0	1–2	1–5
Rouen	2–0	1–2	1–0	0–1	2–0	0–2	3–1	3–0	1–0	7–1	2–0	3–0	0–1	1–0		1–1	1–0	2–2	1–1	3–1
Saint-Étienne	0–0	0–2	0–2	1–0	1–0	0–4	2–0	2–2	0–1	1–0	0–0	3–1	2–3	1–0	1–0		1–0	0–1	1–0	0–1
Sochaux	3–0	2–0	3–1	2–0	0–1	2–2	1–0	2–0	1–1	0–1	0–1	4–1	2–1	1–0	1–1	1–1		0–0	8–2	1–0
Strasbourg	2–1	0–0	2–2	1–0	1–0	2–1	1–1	0–0	0–1	1–1	0–0	1–0	0–0	1–1	0–0	2–0	0–0		2–0	1–3
Toulon	1–0	1–0	1–0	0–0	2–2	3–0	0–3	0–0	1–3	0–0	1–1	3–1	1–0	0–1	1–0	0–1	1–0	1–3		3–2
Toulouse	0–2	4–0	1–3	1–0	0–0	2–0	2–1	3–1	1–1	1–0	3–1	5–0	1–1	3–1	2–0	2–1	0–0	1–0	1–3	

Legend: Blue = home team win; Yellow = draw; Red = away team win.

== Relegation play-offs ==
Team 1	Agg.	Team 2	1st leg	2nd leg
Racing Paris	2–0	Saint-Étienne	0–0	2–0

== Top goalscorers ==
Rank	Player	Club	Goals
1	(France) Patrice Garande	Auxerre	21
1	(Argentina) Delio Onnis	Toulon	21
3	(Poland) Andrzej Szarmach	Auxerre	20
4	(France) Philippe Anziani	Sochaux	18
4	(France) Bernard Genghini	Monaco	18
4	(France) Bernard Lacombe	Bordeaux	18
7	(France) François Brisson	Lens	16
7	(France) Alain Giresse	Bordeaux	16
9	(Socialist Federal Republic of Yugoslavia) Tony Kurbos	Metz	15
10	(France) Jean-François Beltramini	Rouen	14
10	(West Germany) Dieter Müller	Bordeaux	14

== Attendances ==
No.	Club	Average Attendance	Change
1	Paris Saint-Germain FC	23,840	-0.4%
2	Girondins de Bordeaux	17,759	14.1%
3	Toulouse FC	14,887	-6.1%
4	RC Lens	13,923	-28.5%
5	FC Nantes	13,063	-21.8%
6	FC Rouen	11,234	-12.8%
7	RC Strasbourg	10,368	63.3%
8	Stade rennais	9,936	5.5%
9	AS Saint-Étienne	9,658	-15.8%
10	Olympique lyonnais	9,380	-6.1%
11	AJ auxerroise	9,230	10.8%
12	LOSC	8,467	0.6%
13	Sporting Toulon Var	8,242	63.6%
14	Stade Brestois 29	7,891	-23.8%
15	FC Metz	7,883	-15.4%
16	Stade lavallois	7,329	-12.9%
17	Nîmes Olympique	6,442	31.4%
18	AS Nancy	6,428	-28.9%
19	AS Monaco	5,183	52.7%
20	SC Bastia	5,020	27.9%
