= 1975 Coupe de France final =

- Event: 1974–75 Coupe de France
Saint-Étienne	Lens
2	0
- Date: 14 June 1975
- Venue: Parc des Princes, Paris
- Referee: Robert Helies
- Attendance: 44,725

The 1975 Coupe de France final was a football match held at Parc des Princes, Paris on 14 June 1975, that saw AS Saint-Étienne defeat RC Lens 2–0 thanks to goals by Oswaldo Piazza and Jean-Michel Larqué.

== Match details ==
14 June 1975

Saint-Étienne	2–0	Lens
Piazza 68'; Larqué 79'

Parc des Princes, Paris
Attendance: 44,725
Referee: Robert Helies

GK
DF
DF
DF
DF
MF
MF
MF
FW
FW
FW
Substitutes:
MF
Manager:
(France) Robert Herbin Assistant Referees: Fourth Official:

(Socialist Federal Republic of Yugoslavia) Ivan Ćurković
(France) Gérard Janvion
(France) Gérard Farison
(Argentina) Oswaldo Piazza
(France) Christian Lopez
(France) Dominique Bathenay
(France) Patrick Revelli
(France) Jean-Michel Larqué	(c)
(France) Hervé Revelli
(France) Christian Synaeghel	(substituted off) 77'
(France) Christian Sarramagna
(France) Jacques Santini	(substituted in) 77'

GK	(France) André Lannoy
DF	(France) Alain Hopquin
DF	(France) Didier Notheaux
DF	(France) Jacques Marie	(c)
DF	(Poland) Ryszard Grzegorczyk
MF	(France) Jean-Marie Elie
MF	(France) Daniel Leclercq
MF	(Poland) Eugeniusz Faber
MF	(France) Alfred Kaiser
FW	(France) Farès Bousdira
FW	(France) Casimir Zuraszek
Substitutes:
Manager:
(France) Arnold Sowinski

== See also ==
- Coupe de France 1974-75
