= 1974 Coupe de France final =

Final of the 1973–74 edition of the Coupe de France

- Event: 1973–74 Coupe de France
Saint-Étienne	Monaco
2	1
- Date: 8 June 1974
- Venue: Parc des Princes, Paris
- Referee: Achille Verbecke
- Attendance: 45,813

The 1974 Coupe de France final was a football match held at Parc des Princes, Paris, on 8 June 1974 that saw AS Saint-Étienne defeat AS Monaco FC 2–1 thanks to goals by Christian Synaeghel and Alain Merchadier.

== Match details ==
8 June 1974

Saint-Étienne	2–1	Monaco
Synaeghel 44'; Merchadier 61'		Onnis 65'

Parc des Princes, Paris
Attendance: 45,813
Referee: Achille Verbecke

GK	(Socialist Federal Republic of Yugoslavia) Ivan Ćurković
DF	(France) Pierre Repellini
DF	(France) Gérard Farison
DF	(Argentina) Oswaldo Piazza
DF	(France) Christian Lopez
MF	(France) Dominique Bathenay	(substituted off) 58'
MF	(France) Gérard Janvion
MF	(France) Jean-Michel Larqué
FW	(France) Georges Bereta (c)
FW	(France) Christian Synaeghel
FW	(France) Patrick Revelli
Substitutes:
DF	(France) Alain Merchadier	(substituted in) 58'
Manager:
(France) Robert Herbin

GK	(France) Christian Montes
DF	(France) André Guesdon
DF	(France) Georges Polny
DF	(France) Pierre Mosca
DF	(France) Claude Quittet (c)
MF	(France) Yvon Chomet
MF	(France) Aimé Rosso
MF	(France) Jean Petit
MF	(Argentina) Anibal Tarabini
FW	(France) Christian Dalger
FW	(Argentina) Delio Onnis
Substitutes:
Manager:
(Argentina) Ruben Bravo

== See also ==
- 1973–74 Coupe de France
