= Madlenianum Opera and Theatre =

Opera house and theatre in Zemun, Belgrade, Serbia

- Official logo

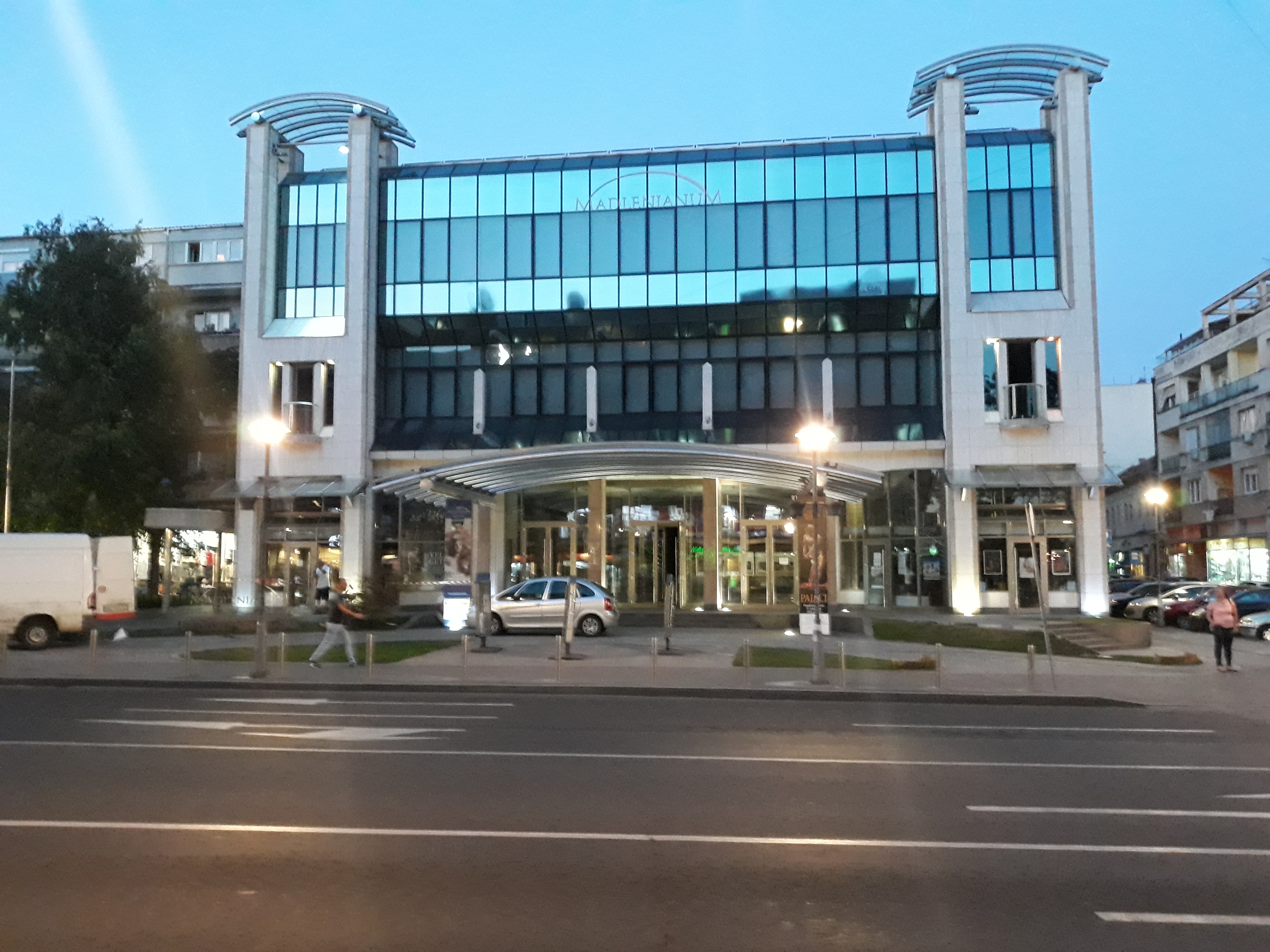
- Madlenianum Opera and Theatre

- Location within Belgrade
- Address: Glavna Street, 32
- Location: Zemun, Belgrade, Serbia
- Coordinates: 44°50′44″N 20°24′39″E
- Owner: Zepter International
- Capacity: 524
- Type: Theatre

Construction
- Opened: 25 December 1997; 28 years ago
- General contractor: Madlena Zepter

Website
- operatheatremadlenianum.com

Madlenianum Opera and Theatre is an opera house and theatre located in Zemun, Belgrade, Serbia. It is the first privately owned opera and theater company both in Serbia and in Southeast Europe. It is located in Belgrade, Serbia, and was founded on 26 January 1999, by Madlena Zepter, wife of Philip Zepter, Serbian businessman. The name Madlenianum derives from Madlena Zepter's name.

== History ==
It is situated in the Old city core of Zemun, which is Spatial Cultural-Historical Units of Great Importance of Serbia. The Theatre houses opera, ballet, concert programs, drama and musical repertoire.

Madlenianum was officially founded on 25 December 1997 by Gordan Dragović Černogorski opera and ballet director, and it is located in the building that previously housed the second stage of the National Theatre in Belgrade. After seven years of work and five different stages of reconstruction, a completely refurbished, reconstructed and conceptually enriched edifice opened its doors to the public on 19 April 2005.

== Productions ==
As of February 2013, the following operas, musicals and plays outside of the standard repertoire were produced at the Madlenianum. Premieres marked with "*" are still in the repertory.

Name	Author, Composer, Choreographer	Premiere	In repertory to date
Opera Il matrimonio segreto	Domenico Cimarosa	1999	
Orpheus in the Underworld	Ballet by Krunislav Simić	1999	
Opera The Rape of Lucretia	Benjamin Britten	1999	
Opera Il signor Bruschino	Gioachino Rossini	2000	
Opera Die Kluge	Carl Orff	2000	
Opera The two widows	Bedřich Smetana	2001	
Nijinsky - Golden bird	Ballet by Krunislav Simić	2001	
Liederabend	Gustav Mahler, Ballet by Duška Sifnios and Vladimir Logunov	2002	
Triptych	Ballet by Ramón Oller	2004	
Tesla	Miloš Crnjanski	2005	
Icy Firefly	Vladan Radoman	2005	
Opera The tales of Hoffmann	Jacques Offenbach	2005	
Don Quixote	Mikhail Bulgakov	2005	
Prometheus bound	Aeschylus	2006	
Wolfgang Amadé	Ballet by Renato Zanella	2006	
Opera Così fan tutte	Wolfgang Amadeus Mozart	2006	
Quartet	Ronald Harwood	2006	
Frida Kahlo	Sanja Domazet	2006	*
Burlesque on the Greek	Andrej Hing	2007	
Musical Les Misérables	Claude-Michel Schönberg	2007	
The Lady from Maxim's (La Dame de chez Maxim)	Georges Feydeau	2008	
Opera The Diary of Anne Frank	Grigory Frid	2008	
The bereaved family (Ožalošćena porodica)	Branislav Nušić	2008	
The Scent of Rain in the Balkans (Miris kiše na Balkanu)	Gordana Kuić	2009	
Cat on a hot tin roof	Tennessee Williams	2009	
Opera The Mandrake (La Mandragola)	Ivan Jevtić	2009	
Wait for me in heaven my love	Fernando Arrabal	2010	
Opera Rita Opera Angélique	Gaetano Donizetti Jacques Ibert	2010	
Indian summer	Ivan Sergeyevich Turgenev	2010	
Breakfast at Tiffany’s	Truman Capote	2011	
Celebrating of love	Ballet by Aleksandar Ilić	2011	
North fairy tale	Edvard Grieg's Peer Gynt, Ballet by Staša Zurovac	2011	
Greta Garbo’s secret (Tajna Grete Garbo)	Miro Gavran	2012	
Two Serbian ballets Ballad of the stray moon Two Serbian ballets The vallet's broom	Dušan Radić, Ballet by Aleksandar Ilić Miloje Milojević, Ballet by Aleksandar Ilić	2012	
Musical Rebecca	Michael Kunze, Sylvester Levay	2012	
Opera for kids Kopriva, kopriva	Milan T Ilić	2013	
Opera for kids The Magic Flute	W. A. Mozart	2013	*
Drama Pierrot Lunaire / Lenz	A. Schoenberg, G. Buchner	2013	

== Gallery ==
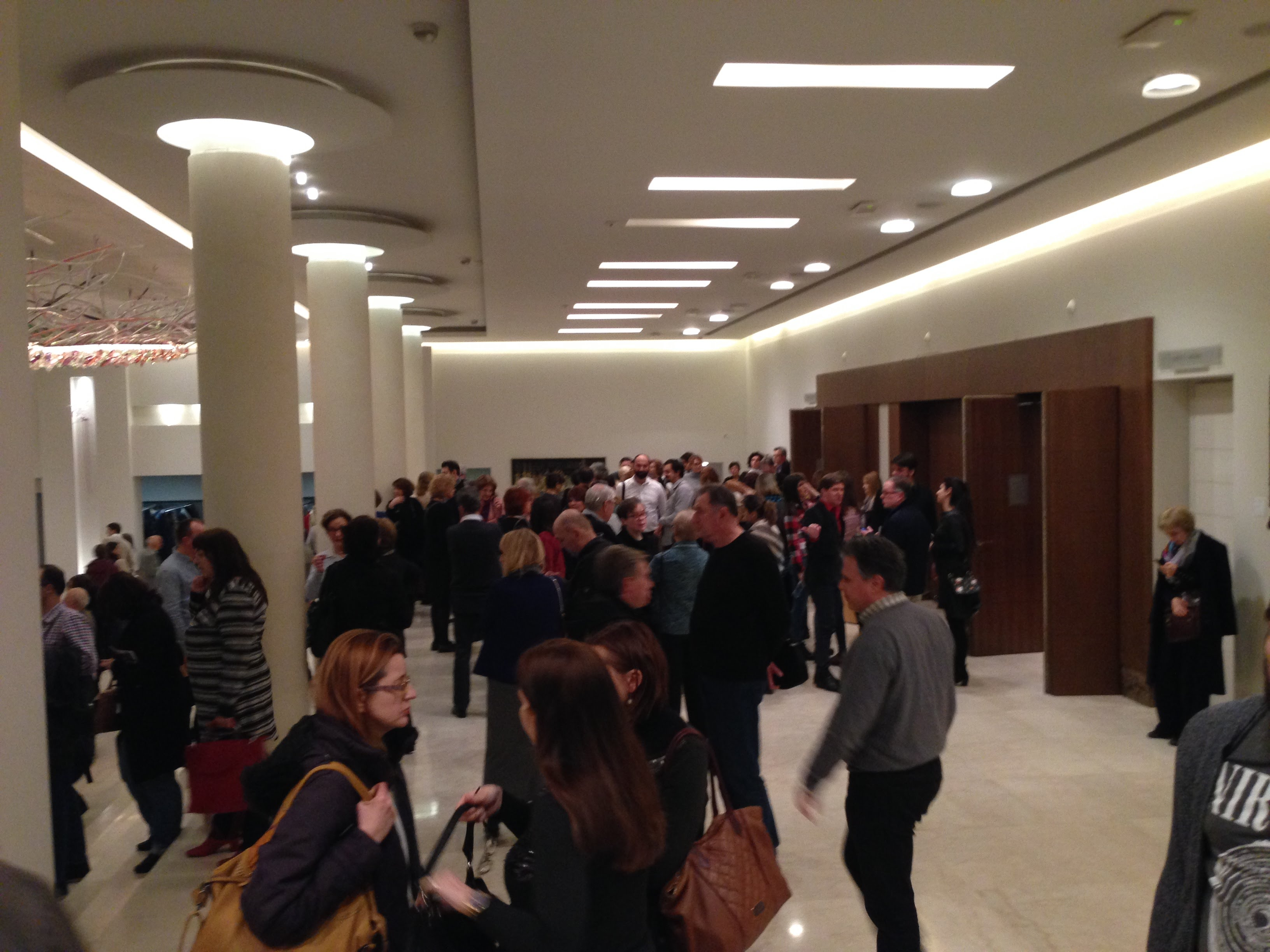
Madlenianum enterier

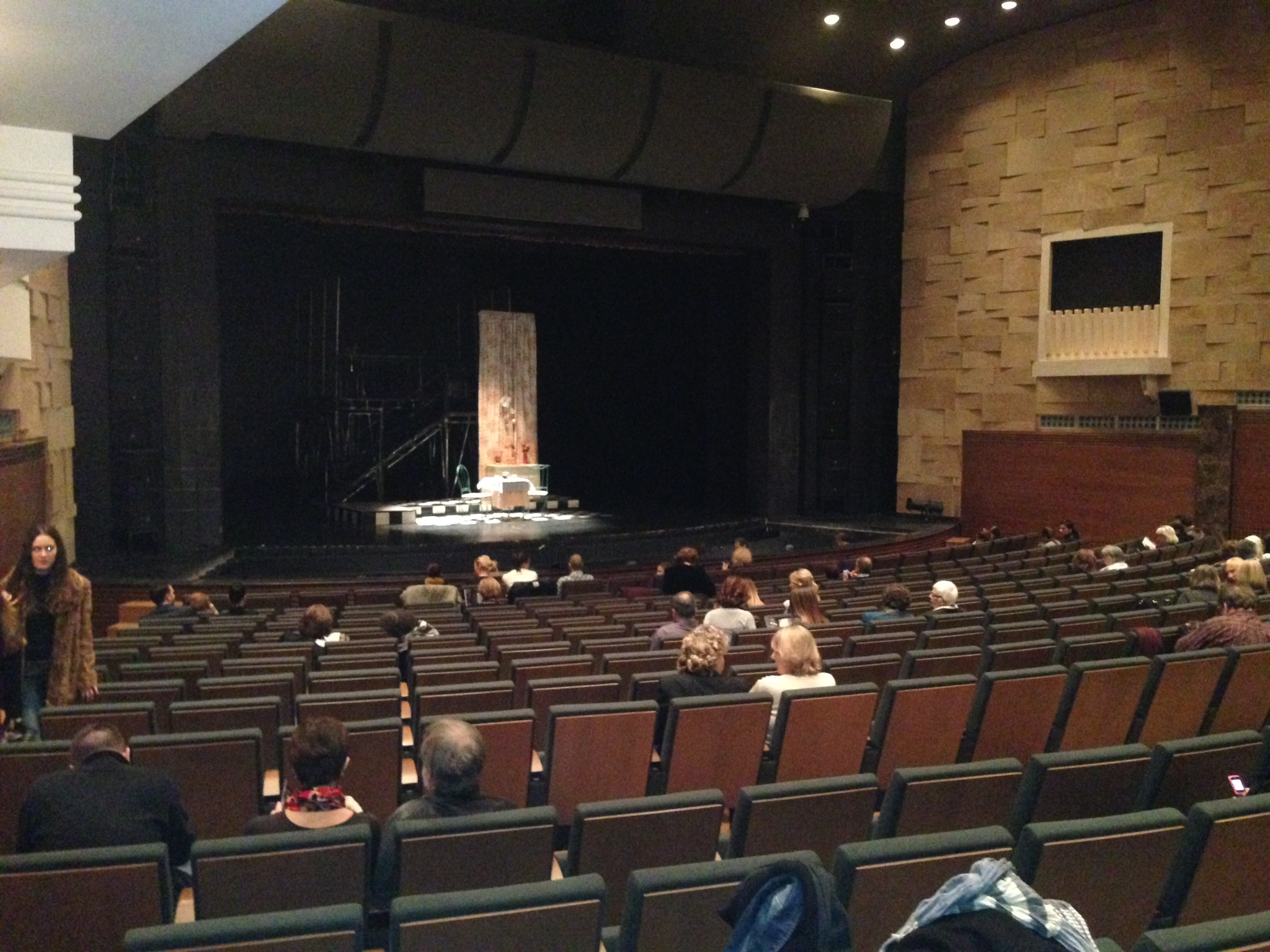
Madlenianum theatre hall

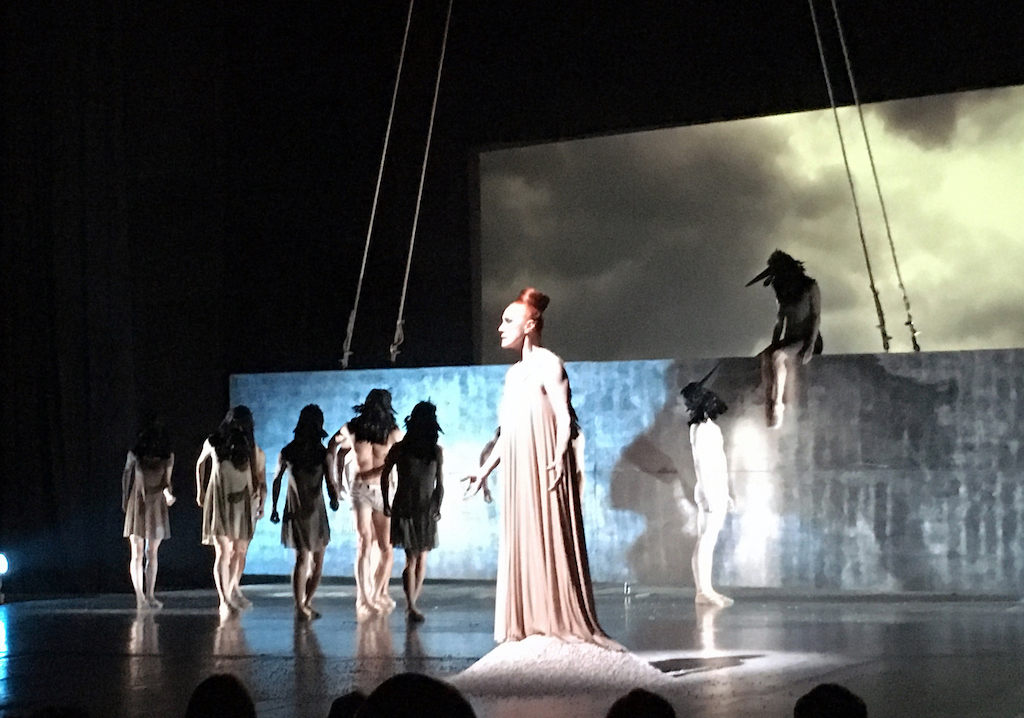
Ballet Dictionary of the Khazars

== See also ==
- List of theatres in Serbia
