= Zepter =

Zepter may refer to:

- Philip Zepter (born 1950), Serbian entrepreneur
- Zepter International, multinational company owned by Philip Zepter
- German word for sceptre
