= Christian Ide Hintze =

Austrian poet and performance artist

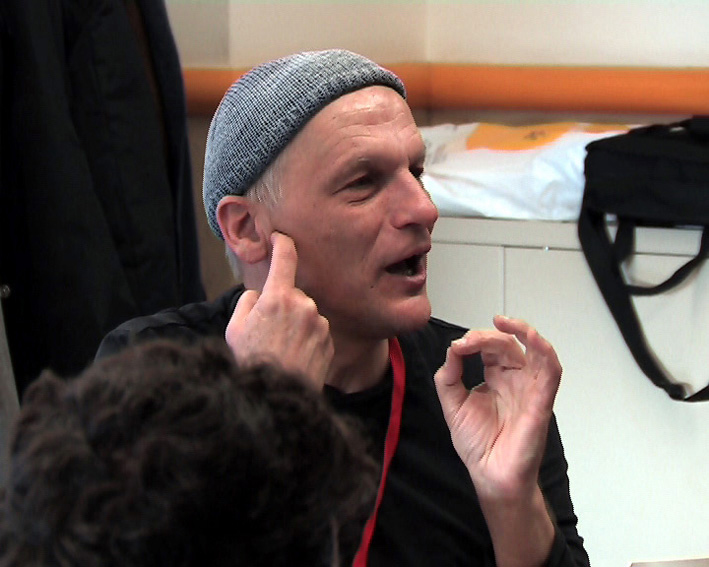
Hintze giving a lecture at University of Barcelona, 2009

Christian Ide Hintze (December 26, 1953 – February 2012) was an Austrian poet and performance artist, who focused on the transition from literary to crossmedia forms.

== Biography ==
Christian Ide Hintze was born on December 26, 1953, in Vienna. Between 1972 and 1974, he worked as a Super-8 filmmaker and street singer in Scandinavia, England, France and Spain. Between 1974 and 1978, in addition to studying theater and communications at the University of Vienna, he worked as a distributor of megaphone, poster and leaflet texts in Austria, Germany, Switzerland and Holland. His actions resulted in numerous charges of "obstructing pedestrian traffic" and "contamination of public buildings". In 1976 he was arrested and interrogated by the police in East Berlin. In 1978 he was expelled from the book fair in Stuttgart and convicted of criminal damage in Vienna (for pasting banners, posters and poems onto the Burgtheater). In 1979 the Austrian filmmaker Alfred Kaiser published a film about his work in public spaces.

In the 1980s Hintze undertook several 'pilgrimages' to the Greek island of Lesbos to celebrate his favourite poet, Sappho, and created a series of multi-media poem cycles ("tetralogies"), using "gestures", "graphemes", "phonemes", "audio", and "video" as elements. The works oscillate between semantic and non-semantic structures and are multilingual. They have been presented at ateliers, festivals and public areas and have led to collaborations with Allen Ginsberg, Henri Chopin, Emil Siemeister and Falco. "What Ide aims at is a poetry to be perceived not only with the brain, but also with the whole body; the sensorial poetry, capable of achieving the 'communication monopoly' he had long pined for."

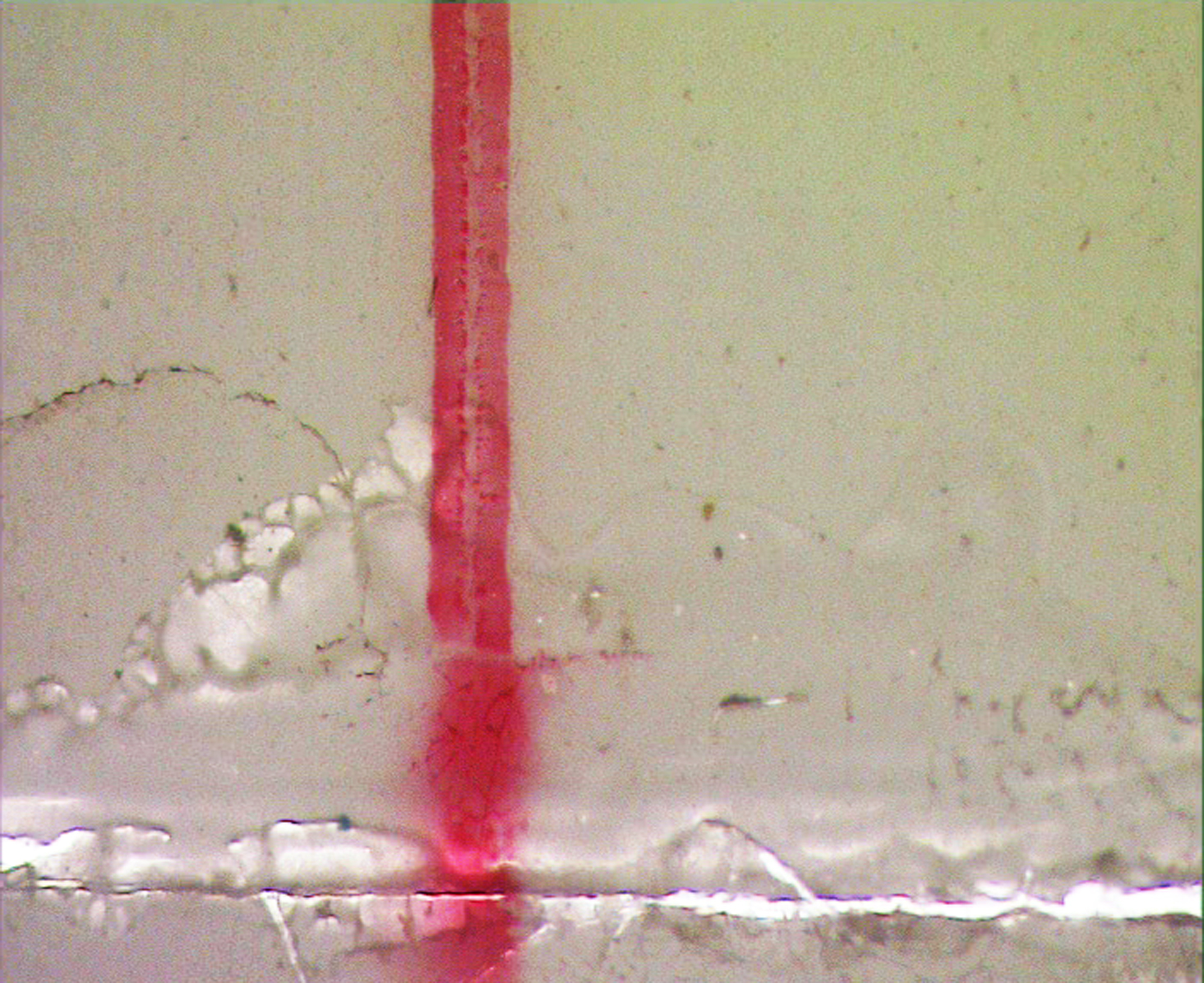
1973: "Prolog 1", super 8 film

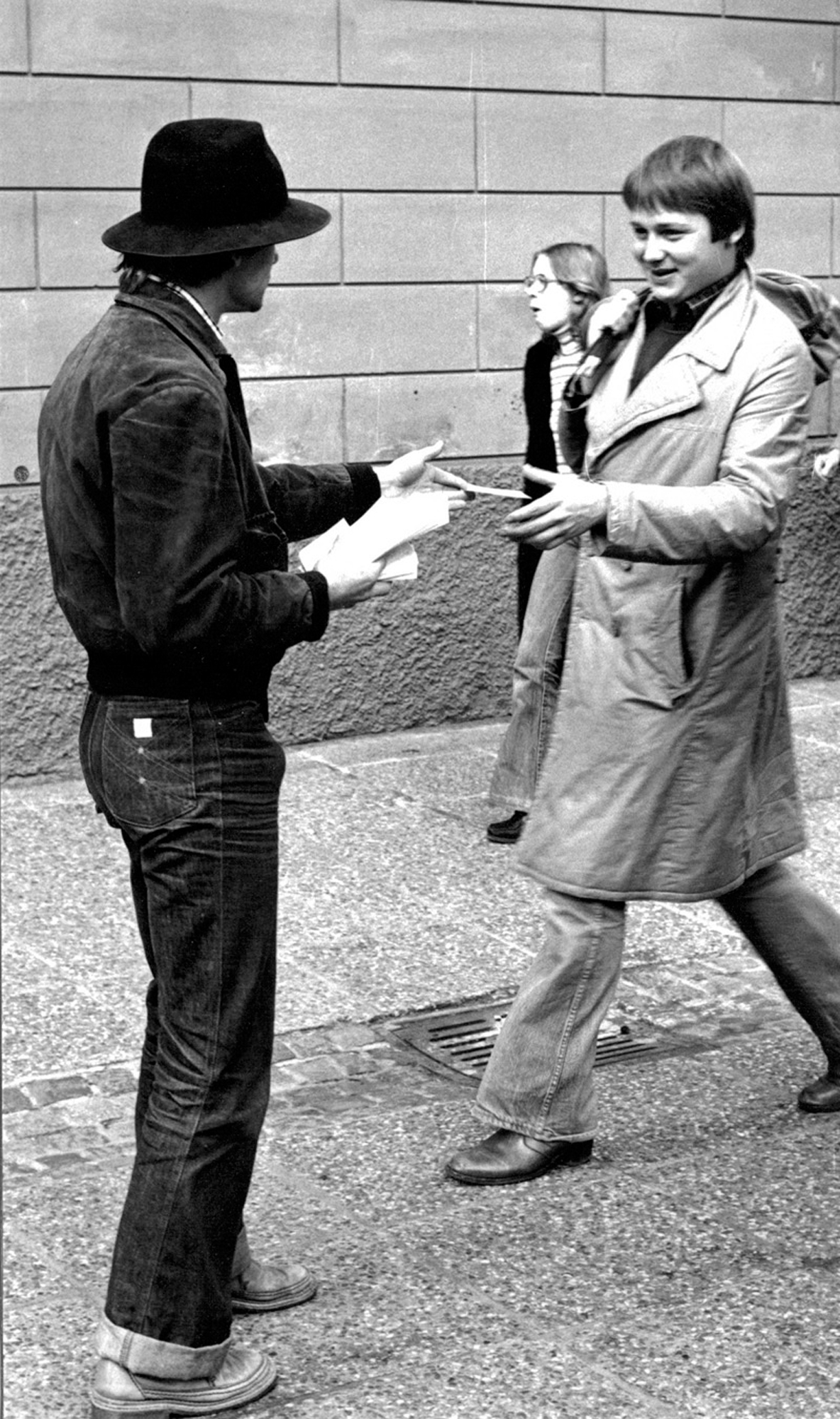
1974-78: Street poet

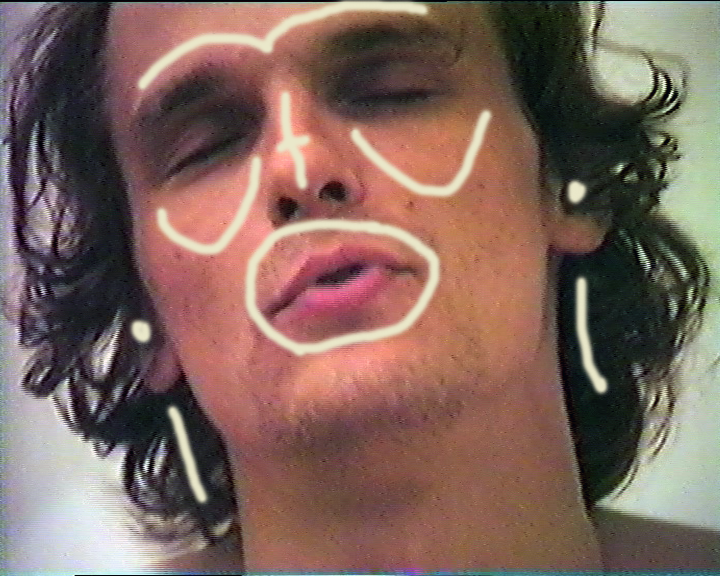
1982: "iumotui", painted video still

In 1984 Hintze built a poet's temple near the underground station of Karlsplatz in Vienna. The "LI-TE“, a closed-circuit installation in public space, consisted of 4 letter sculptures, a wooden trumpet cross and a hut where the author lived and worked for three weeks. The temple was sponsored by GRUNDIG-Austria and had 3 live cameras and 11 monitors equipped to run the 16 video loops.

"The golden flood", a volume of written poetry that portraits the conditions of vagrancy, appeared in 1987, was translated into several languages and received comprehensive reviews in Germany, Switzerland, Cuba, Vietnam and Argentina. "His searches have something in common with the best "exteriorismo" of Nicaraguan poetry (Cardenal, Coronel Urtecho) or with the striking uninhibitedness of the American "beatnik" movement." "Pindar, Klopstock, Whitman, Rilke, Eliot, Ginsberg, Brinkmann. It is to this tradition that Hintze's book "The golden flood" belongs."

In 1993 Hintze undertook, at the invitation of Miguel Barnet and the Cuban writers’ union UNEAC, a reading tour of Cuba. In the same year he taught, as the first Western author, at the Institute of Literature Nguyên Du in Hanoi (Vietnam). In 1995 he was the first German-language author who taught at the Jack Kerouac School of Disembodied Poetics in Boulder, Colorado (USA). In 1996, he was the co-initiator of the "escuela de poesía" in Medellín (Colombia)

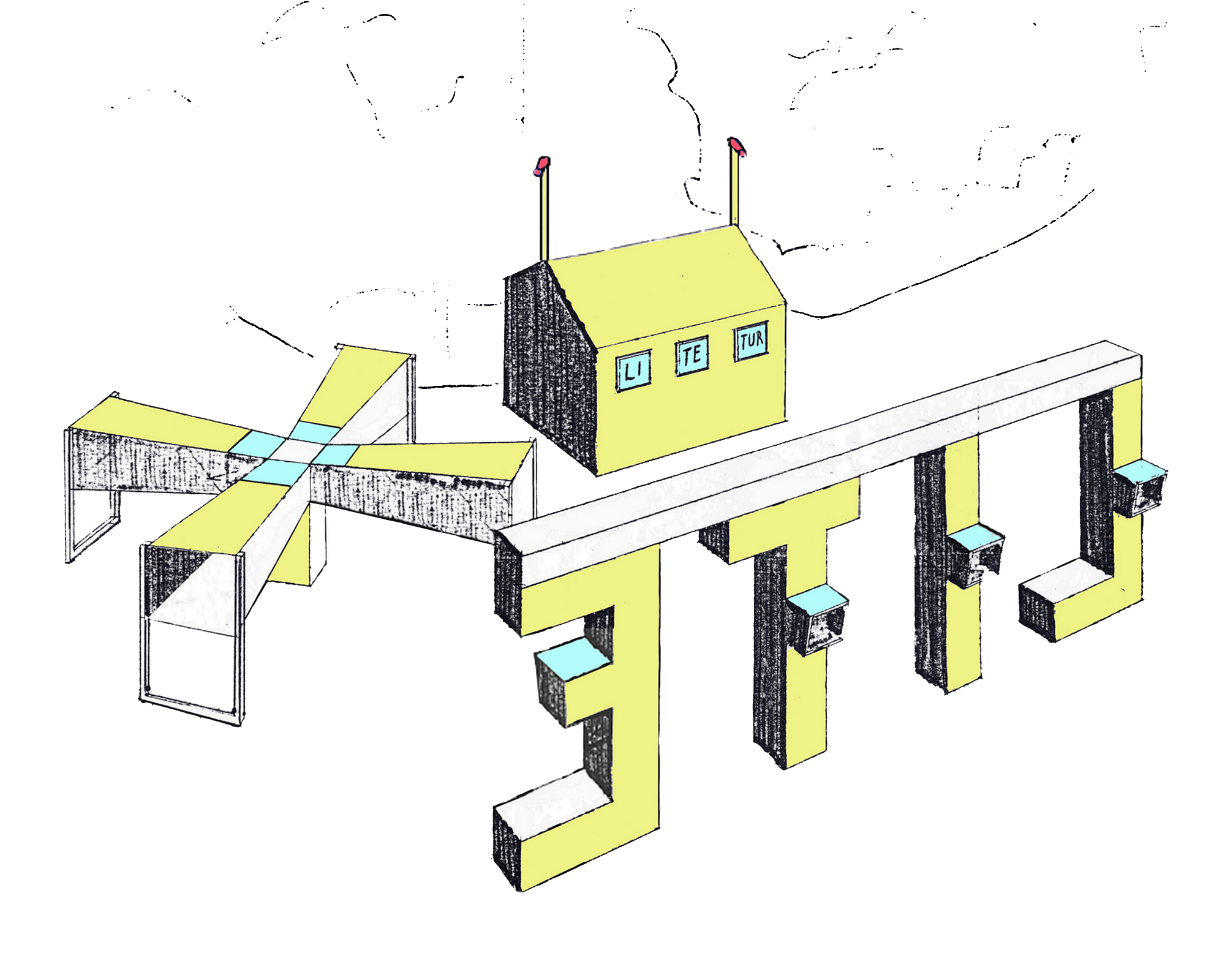
1984: "LI-TE" draft

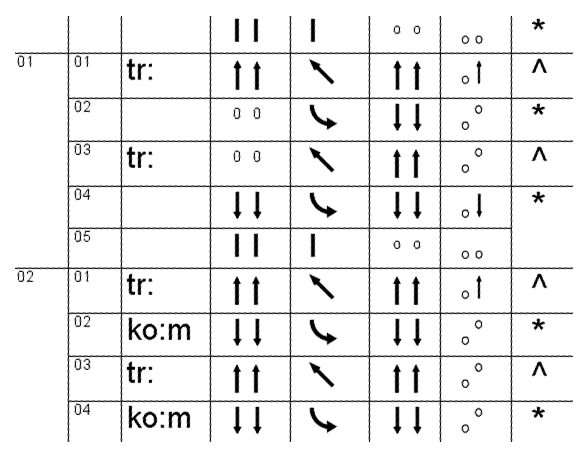
1991: score to performative poem

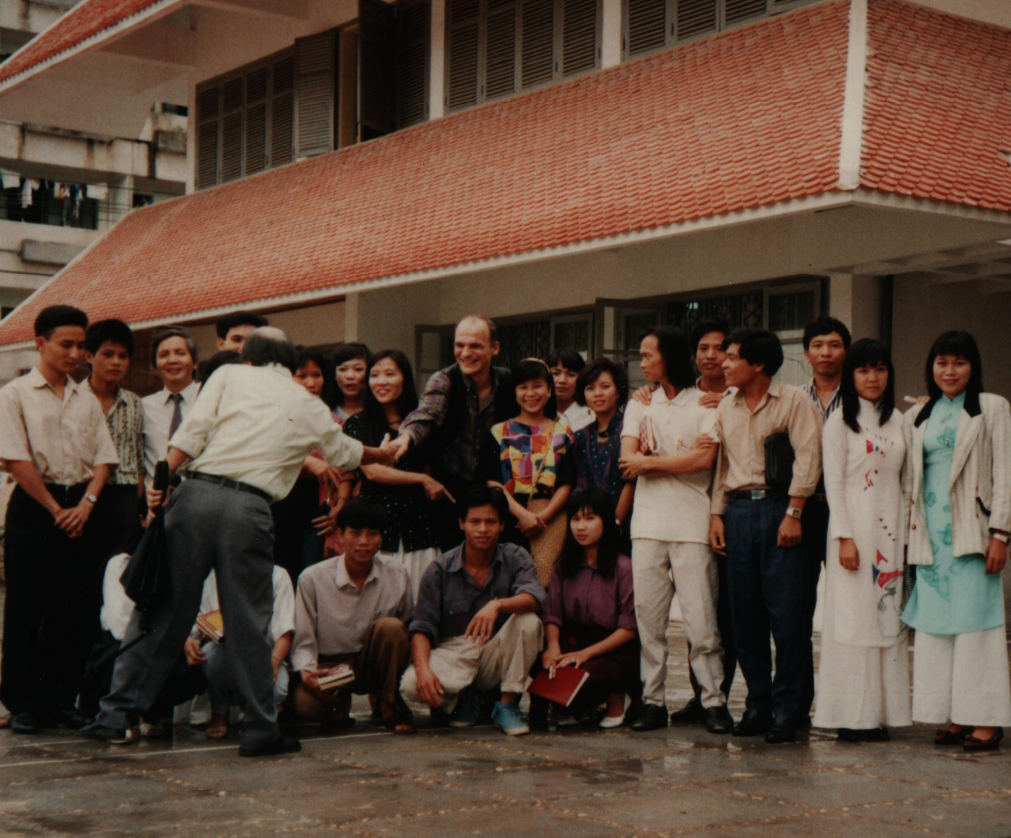
1993: with his students, Hanoi

His project "Writing in Water" was realized in 1998 in the spa Oberlaa, Vienna. Hintze wanted to find out whether the emergence of language and phenomena such as rhyme and refrain have something to do with the phylogenetic origin of man out of water.

In 2004 he took part in the Austrian pre-selection show of the Eurovision Song Contest and reached the third place. His contribution, the song "Link Love!", is a statement against racism and for mutual cultural understanding. The text consists of multilingual versions of "I love you".

In 2008 and 2009 he presented his concept of a "7fold poetics" at the Orivesi college of Art, the University of Barcelona and at the Poetry Festival in Oslo. Hintze considers the genesis of poetry to comprise 3 stages (mythical: oral-performative poetry, historical: literary poetry, digital: multi-media poetry) and introduces 7 categories of creation and communication: acoustic, visual, literary, performative, interactive, infrastructural and instructive. "Hintze's unusual theory holds that only after a long period of domination by writing, with the discovery of new media, audio and video tapes, and subsequently of digital technologies and the internet, did poetry return to its roots."

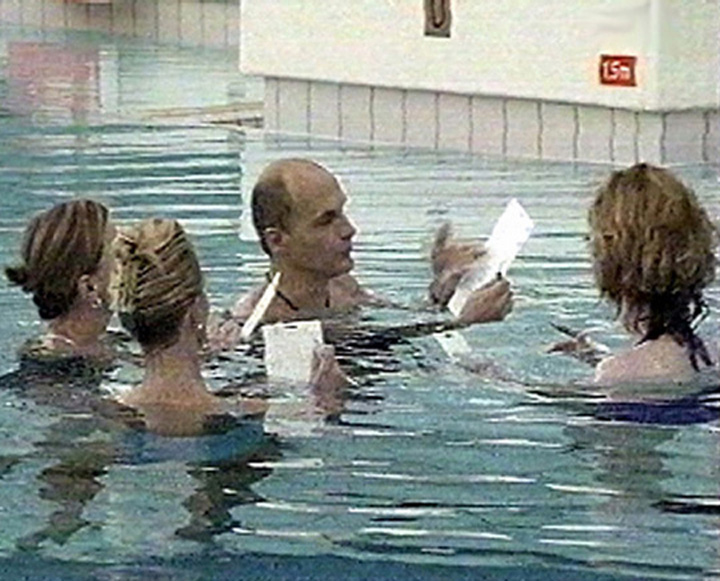
1998: "Writing in water"

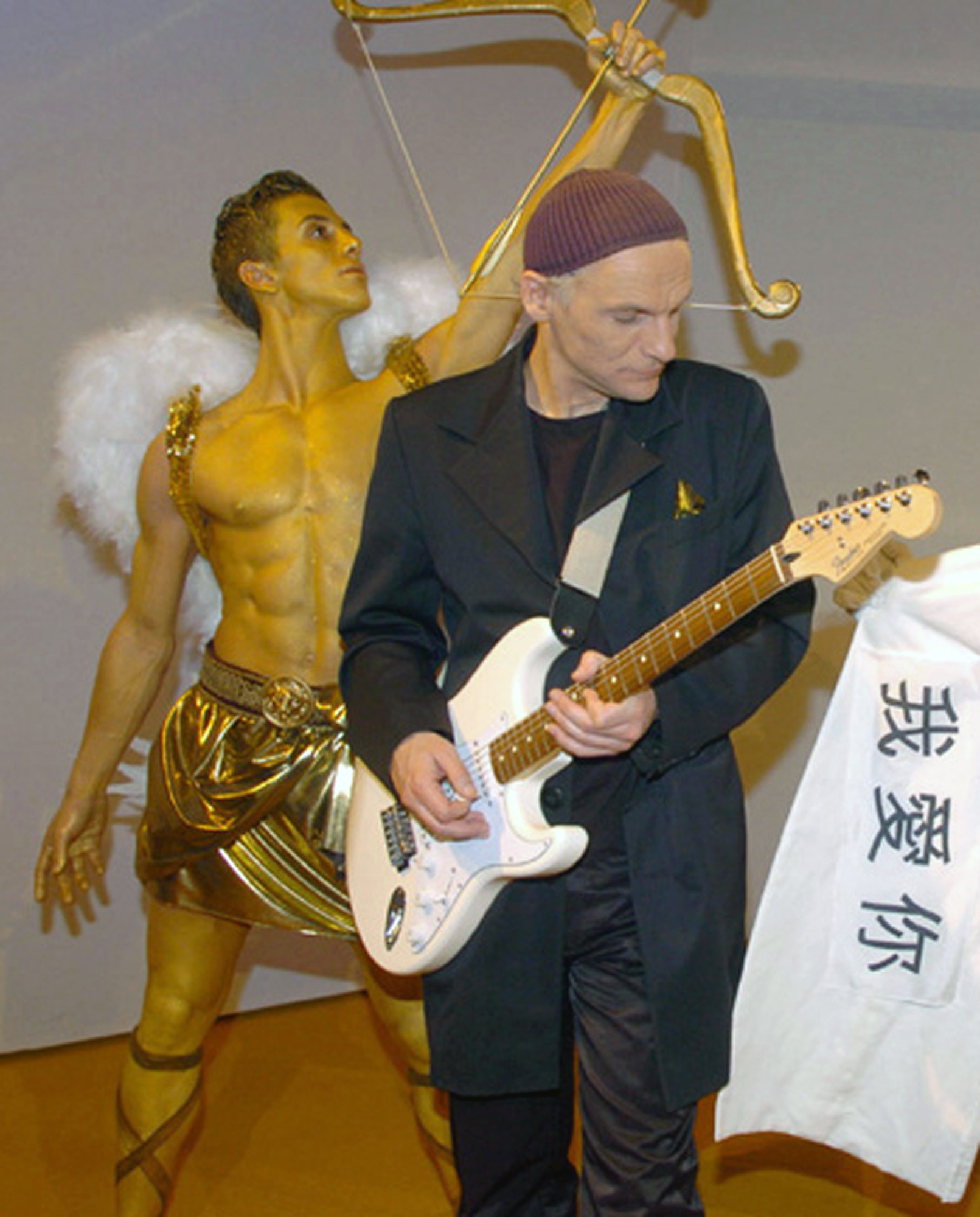
2004: "Link Love"

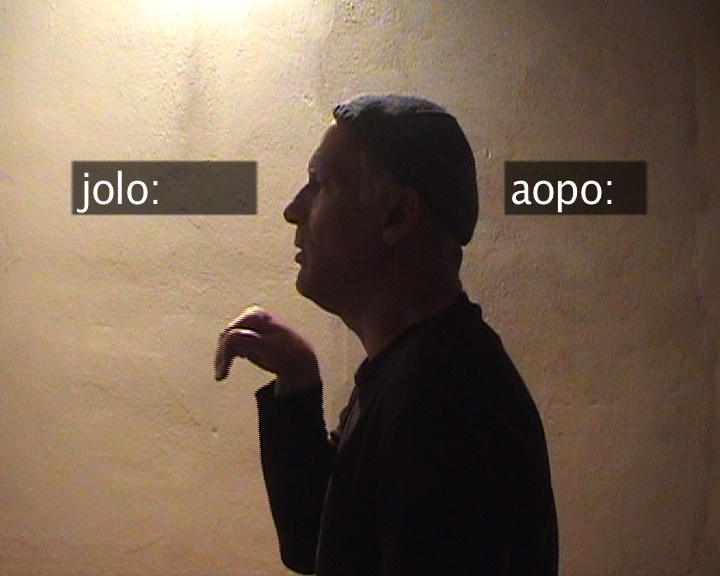
2010: "performative poem

Christian Ide Hintze engages in language policy, propagates lower case writing, organizes cross-cultural events and has run, since 1992, the vienna poetry school. Those who have taught there include Allen Ginsberg, Humberto Ak'abal, Nick Cave, H. C. Artmann, Anne Waldman, Blixa Bargeld, Falco, Wolfgang Bauer, Fernando Rendón, Henri Chopin, Ed Sanders, Ayu Utami and Inger Christensen.

Hintze's works have been presented at festivals and exhibitions in Hall in Tirol (1974), Esslingen (1976), Vienna (1981), Ljubljana (1983), Turino (1984), The Hague (1985), Tokyo (1986), Bern (1987), Buenos Aires (1993), Stockholm (1993), Medellín (1995/1996/2011), Rosario (1996), Berlin (1998), Barcelona (2000), Jakarta (2001), Milano (2007), Novi Sad (2008) and Oslo (2009).

== Selected works ==
acoustic

- 30 Rufe (30 Callings). Poems with audio-samples, drumcomputer, solo- und multitrack-voice. CD. German and phonetic language. extraplatte, Vienna 1992. EX 162C
- [ampf]. Notes, poems, sequences & songs. Asemantic acoustic poetry. CD. extraplatte, Vienna 2000. EX 462-2
- link love!. Songs and videoclips. CD. 73 languages. Alphabet / Modena, Vienna 2004. LC 08340

visual

- Der Blick aus meinem Fenster (Looking out my window). Super-8-film. ORF "Lumier's children", Austria 1974
- mmm, non-alphabetic letter signs. Video and 136 drawings. P-Tapes, Vienna 1983, and WTG, Vienna 2006
- Act in A and AH. Poem for 1 spoken sound, 1 live-camera, 1 monitor & 3 symbols. Video, Vienna 1985
- Lesson in looking. Insert-screen-poem. Video, 2 min., Vienna 1985

literary

- Zettelalbum. Street diary, leaflet poems, letters by passers-by. Book. German. 222 pages. Michael Schönemann Verlag, Kisslegg 1978. ISBN 3-921825-12-1
- Die goldene Flut (The golden Flood). 129 poems. 200 pages. Book. German. Verlag Kiepenheuer & Witsch, Cologne 1987. ISBN 3-462-01815-9
- Autoren als Revolutionäre (Authors as revolutionaries). Dialogues with Henri Chopin, Mircea Dinescu, Gioconda Belli, Anne Waldman, Allen Ginsberg, Ryszard Dreger, Anna Leska. Book. German. edition selene, Vienna 2002. ISBN 3-85266-176-5
- Bruce Chatwin and Christian Ide Hintze Dream-Time / A Rainbow-Travel. Concertina style artists' book. Alinea-Presse, Berlin, Germany, 1993. 60 copies published in English, 100 in German.

performative

- Kundgebung der Anwesenden (Manifestation of attendants). Instant street drama. Salzburg 1976
- Gold im Ofen (Gold in the oven). Theatre play. produced by Wiener Festwochen / the Vienna Festival. Vienna 1981
- nantzn. Asemantic performance poetry. DVD. Asemantic phonetic language. Modena / [a:o], Vienna 2010. ISBN 978-3-9502923-0-5
- mamama papapa. Dialogue writer – drawer, video performance & drawings. With Emil Siemeister. Modena / [a:o]. Vienna 2010. ISBN 978-3-9502923-1-2

interactive

- Zettel. Leaflets, flyers, hand outs. Distributed by the author in the street, in front of cinemas, theatres, stadiums etc. Ca. 1,2 million copies. Austria, Germany, Holland, Switzerland 1974–78
- Writing off the back of others. Chain-poem with passers-by. Vienna, Austria 1975
- E1. Card game. Alphanumeric symbols. Vienna, Austria 1977
- IPPOI. Interactive Internet Platform. English. Austrian cultural forum New York, New York & internet 1995
- internet-icons. Emoticons. Interactive digital classroom. German. vienna poetry school, Vienna & Internet 1997

infrastructural

- L-LI-OBO. 4-monitor installation in a wooden box. 4 looped videos. Body-voice-audio-video-dialogues. English, French and phonetic language. With Henri Chopin. Vienna 1983
- I-Tetralogy. Multimedia poetry. 1 box of playing cards, 1 audio tape, 2 video tapes. German and phonetic language. P-Tapes, Vienna 1984
- LI-TE. Closed circuit 4-media installation in public space. German, French, English and phonetic language. Sponsored by Grundig Austria, Vienna 1984
- ide7fold. Videoclip-based online platform. Inauguration: 2008. Work in progress

instructive

- Poly poetyka. video. How i work with audio, video, voice, body & script. Examples 1983–88. Rome & Vienna 1988
- Internet-icons. Documentation of a teaching process at the internet. Essay, German, in: 5 Internetklassen. Ed. by Orhan Kipcak and Barbara Ruhsmann. Vienna 2000. ISBN 3-85165-438-2
- Poetry in times of transition / 7fold poetics. Laptop lecture, English & Catalan, in: Poesia contemporània, tecnologies i educació. Ed. by Glòria Bordons and Lis Costa. Book & DVD. Publicacions i edicions Universitat de Barcelona. Barcelona 2010. ISBN 978-84-475-3430-2

== Teachings ==
- 2011: Medellín, Colombia, Museo de Antioquia: "Poesía experimental", class. Organized by Escuela de Poesía de Medellìn & Prometeo
- 2009: Barcelona, Spain, University of Barcelona: Presentation of the "7fold poetics"-concept as part of a seminar on "Contemporary poetry, technologies and education". Organized by the research group "POCIO.Poetry and education".
- 2008: Orivesi, Finland, Orivesi College of Art: "Sound poetry, voice and body", class. Organized by Orivesi College of Art.
- 2005: Prague, Czech republic, Literární Akademie: "Spoken sound poetry", master class. Organized by Literárni Akademie & European Network of Creative Writing Programmes.
- 2003: Denpasar & Jakarta, Indonesia, Komunitas Utan Kayu: "Sound poetry pop", class, student-interviews, panels, colloquium, faculty-performance. Organized by Komunitas Utan Kayu & Vienna Poetry School (vps).
- 2001: Vienna, Austria, University of Music and Performing Arts: "From soundpoetry to pop", lecture & exercise. Organized by University of Music and Performing Arts.
- 2000: Internet: "European loveletter – latin, central european, cyrillic, greek letters, fonts & spelling systems", online class, lecture. Together with Renée Gadsen & Gertraud Marinelli-König. Organized by vps.
- 1998: Vienna, Austria, Thermalbad Oberlaa: "Writing in water", class, lecture, student-interviews. Together with Helga Pesserer. Teachers & students working in the water. Organized by Thermalbad Oberlaa & vps.
- 1997: Internet: "Internet-icons – hieroglyphs & modern icons", online class, lecture, chat. Organized by vps.
- 1996: Medellín, Colombia, Universidad de Antioquía: "Cultos y incultos", lecture, "Una piramida de luz", speech & "Voz y cuerpo – score-problems, vocal poetry, dadaism, jitanjafora", class. Organized by Prometeo, Escuela de Poesía & vps.
- 1995: Boulder, Colorado, USA, Jack Kerouac School of Disembodied Poetics: "Sound poetry", class, student-Interviews, panels, colloquium, faculty-performance, lecture. Organized by Naropa University.
- 1993: Hanoi, Vietnam, Institute of Literature Nguyên Du: "Trained & untrained - traditions of modern poetry", class & lecture. Organized by the Institute of Literature Nguyên Du.
- 1992: Vienna, Austria, University of Applied Arts: "Speaking the voice - oral traditions, poly-vocal poetry", class, lecture, student-interviews. Organized by vps.
- 1989: Rome, Italy, Deutsche Schule: "Experimental literature", workshop. Organized by the department of culture of the Austrian embassy in Rome.
- 1979: Linz, Austria, university of industrial design: "Hand-out, poster, performance", workshop talk, demonstration of examples. Organized by Wolf Sator & "Aktuelles Forum".
- 1976: Esslingen, Germany, Webergasse: "Durchsuchung eines Sprachraums - Handwerk, Mundwerk, Mailart", street lecture, exercises with passers-by. Organized by Michael Schönemann and the "qualerie" gallery.
- 1975: Salzburg, Summer Academy: "Interactive Action theatre", demonstrations, discussions & exercises. Together with German actress Christiane Schröder. Organized by Wolfgang Glück and the Summer Academy.

== Editor (selection) ==
- Falco's many languages. Book. German. A collection of poetological essays by experts of language & literature on the Austrian popstar. Edition schule für dichtung, Residenz Verlag. Vienna 2010. ISBN 978-3-7017-3183-1
- Falco: lyrics complete. Book. German (Falco's lyrics are a combination of German, English, Austrian, Spanish, Italian, French, Greek). Foreword by Christian Ide Hintze. Afterword by Peter Ernst: Edition schule für dichtung, Residenz Verlag. Vienna 2009. ISBN 978-3-7017-1529-9
- Viva la Poesía. Book & CD. German with some original texts in English. Nick Cave, Falco & Allen Ginsberg at the schule für dichtung. Songs, pictures, anecdotes. Residenz Verlag. Vienna – Salzburg – Frankfurt 2002. ISBN 3-7017-1337-5
- Sound poetry live. CD. English, German & asemantic acoustic language. poems by Allen Ginsberg, Wolfgang Bauer, Sainkho Namtchylak, Edward Sanders. sfd records 1998
- Poetiken (Poetics). Book. German. A collection of lectures. Edition schule für dichtung, Passagen Verlag 1993. ISBN 3-85165-127-8
- Über die Lehr- und Lernbarkeit von Literatur (On the teach- and learnability of literature). Book. German. Ed. together with Dagmar Travner. Edition schule für dichtung, Passagen Verlag. Vienna 1993. ISBN 3-85165-048-4

== Comments ==
- "Someone capable of taking the art of speaking and the expressiveness of the body as sources of renewal of poetic creativity." (Marylin Bobes, Cuba 1993)
- "Whether Hintze is referred to as a postmodern romantic, a descendant of the expressionists, a new goliard or a shamanistic pop singer, will not worry the enthusiast. He has found his own rhapsodic tone." (Süddeutsche Zeitung, Germany 1987)
- "I even noticed that he was received by the younger ones just like a Messiah – as if an artistic personality of this kind had never before emerged on the scene." (Friederike Mayröcker, Austria 1981)
- "He always stood up for and praised those who held dignity, poverty and humbleness high and fought against the power-abuse of oppression." (Vinh K. Huynh, Vietnam 1993)
- "He is the modern minstrel and an extraordinary poet. Because he does it the activist, the gestual, the histrionic way." (Miguel Barnet, Cuba 1993)
- "The Austrian Christian Ide Hintze likes the idea of merging the mundane with the spiritual, the female with the male, the avandgardist with the traditional, the oriental with the occidental, the characters of the alphabet with the new signs of the electronic world." (La Capital, Argentina 1996)
- "Christian Ide Hintze thrilled the audience at the international Novi Sad literature festival with his unusual performance. Hintze spoke poems, danced on stage, played a self-made instrument, and introduced a theory." (Vecernje Novosti, Serbia 2008)
- "Here is, i guess, a complete poet, both in oeuvre and in action." (Henri Chopin, France 1993)
- "He truly is a cosmopolitan, who seems to be faithful to the idea of poetry as a wide, global phenomenon." (Aleksis Salusjärvi, Finland 2009)
- "In his per- (or more appropriately) trans-formances he shows in disconcerting and frightening manner how thin the skin of civilisation that we have been given through Enlightenment really is." (Julian Schutting, Austria 2010)
