= Hintze =

Hintze is a surname. Notable people with the surname include:

- Almut Hintze (born 1957), philologist, linguist and scholar of Indo-Iranian studies
- Carl Hintze (1851–1916), German mineralogist and crystallographer
- Christian Ide Hintze (1953–2012), Austrian poet and performance artist
- Johannes Hintze (born 1999), German swimmer
- Kurt Hintze (1901–1944), German politician
- Michael Hintze (born 1953), British-Australian businessman, philanthropist and Conservative Party patron, based in the United Kingdom
- Otto Hintze (1861–1940), German historian of public administration
- Peter Hintze (1950–2016), German politician of the Christian Democratic Union (CDU) and from 2013 one of the six Vice Presidents of the Bundestag
- Paul von Hintze (1864–1941), German naval officer, diplomat and politician

== See also ==
- Christian Hintze Holm (born 1964), Norwegian politician for the Socialist Left Party
- Ernesto Hintze Ribeiro (1849–1907), Portuguese politician, statesman
- Hintze Ribeiro Bridge collapse, a 2001 bridge collapse in Portugal that killed 59 people
