= Patrick Revelli =

French footballer (born 1951)

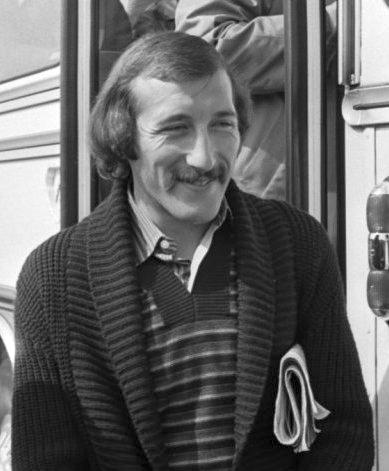
- Revelli in 1976

Personal information
- Date of birth: 22 June 1951 (age 75)
- Place of birth: Mimet, France
- Position: Striker

Senior career*
Years	Team	Apps	(Gls)
1968–1978	Saint-Étienne	226	(74)
1978–1982	Sochaux	146	(27)
1982–1984	Cannes	61	(8)
Total		434	(109)

International career
1973–1977	France	5	(1)
- * Club domestic league appearances and goals

Patrick Revelli (born 22 June 1951) is a French former professional football striker and brother of the footballer Hervé Revelli.

== Honours ==
Saint-Étienne

- Ligue 1: 1969–70, 1973–74, 1974–75, 1975–76
- Coupe de France: 1973–74, 1974–75, 1976–77
- European Cup runner-up: 1975–76
