= Hervé Bazile =

Haitian footballer (born 1990)

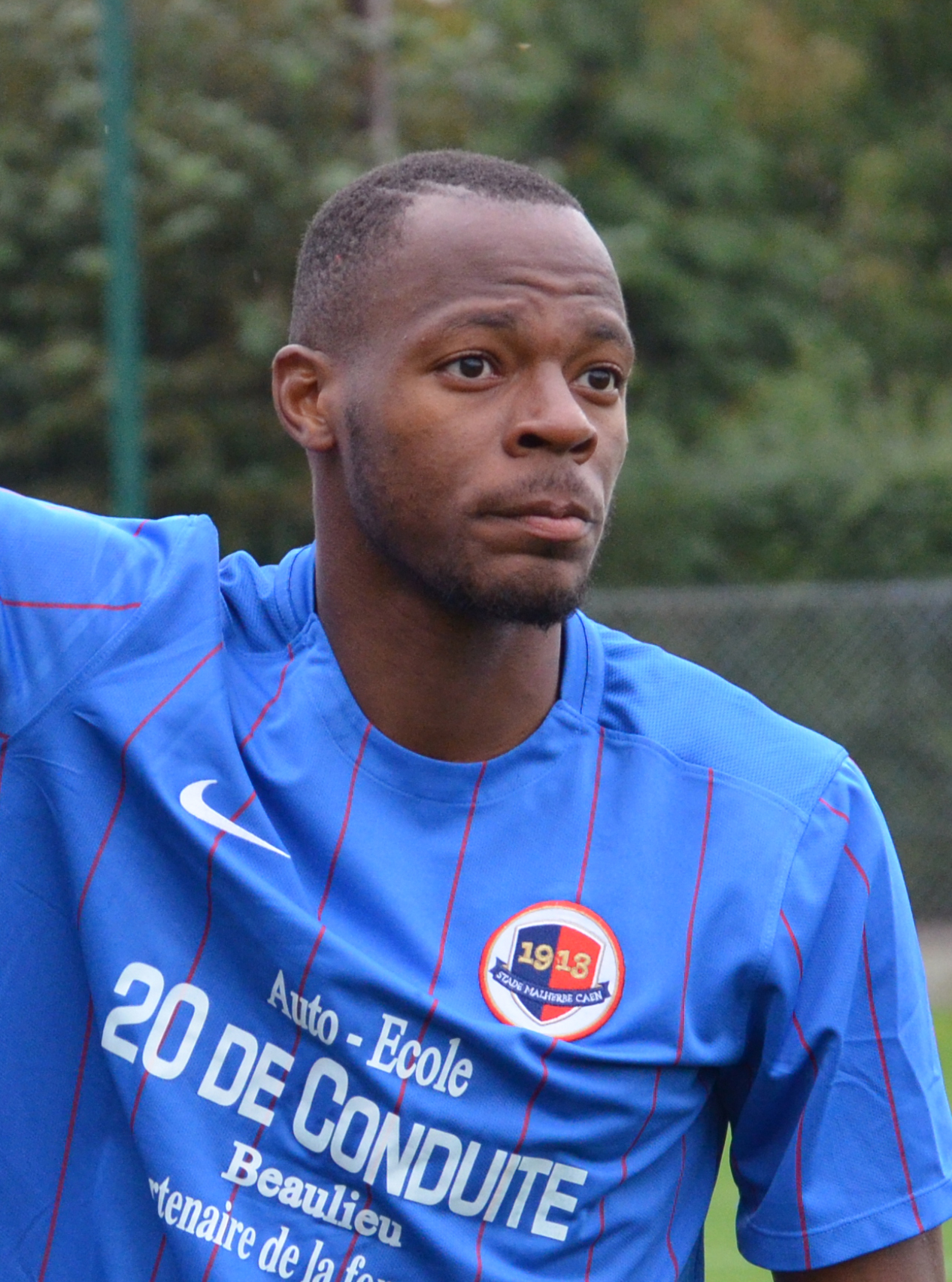

Personal information
- Date of birth: 18 March 1990 (age 36)
- Place of birth: Créteil, France
- Height: 1.81 m (5 ft 11 in)
- Positions: Attacking midfielder; striker

Team information
- Current team: Wasquehal
- Number: 17

Youth career
- 2006–2008: Guingamp

Senior career*
Years	Team	Apps	(Gls)
2008–2011	Guingamp	32	(2)
2011–2013	Amiens	40	(10)
2013–2014	Le Poiré-sur-Vie	27	(10)
2014–2018	Caen	93	(9)
2018–2021	Le Havre	48	(6)
2019	Le Havre II	4	(1)
2022–2023	SC Hérouville		
2023–2024	ASD Ilvamaddalena 1903	9	(1)
2024–2025	US Tempio		
2025–26	Wasquehal	0	(0)
2026 -	CA Lisieux Football Pays d'Auge	0	(0)

International career
2008–2009	France U19	9	(2)
2019–2021	Haiti	13	(1)
- * Club domestic league appearances and goals as of 9 October 2025

Hervé Bazile (born 18 March 1990) is a professional footballer who plays as a forward for CA Lisieux Football Pays d'Auge. Born in France, he played for the Haiti national team.

== Career ==
Bazile made his professional football debut on 11 November 2008 in a 2–4 loss to Bordeaux in the 2008–09 edition of the Coupe de la Ligue coming on as a substitute playing 24 minutes. He made his league debut a month later on 5 December 2008 in a 0–0 draw against Montpellier again appearing as a substitute.

== International career ==
Bazile played on the France U-19 squad. He formally switched allegiance to the Haitian national football team, and was on reserve squad for the 2015 Gold Cup.

He made his Haiti national football team debut on 2 June 2019, in a friendly against El Salvador, as a starter.

=== International goals ===
Scores and results list Haiti's goal tally first.

No.	Date	Venue	Opponent	Score	Result	Competition
1.	29 June 2019	NRG Stadium, Houston, United States	Canada	2–2	3–2	2019 CONCACAF Gold Cup

== Trophies ==
Club Domestic
Coupe de France	Winner	1x	2008/2009
Trophée des Champions	Runner-up	1x	2009/2010

== Personal life ==
Bazile is of Haitian descent.
