= Madlena Zepter =

Serbian businessperson

- Born: 1947 (age 77–78); Belgrade, FPR Yugoslavia
- Known for: Founder of Madlenianum Opera and Theatre; Zepter International
- Spouse: Philip Zepter
- Children: 1

Madlena Zepter, also known as Madlena Janković (born in 1947) is a Serbian businesswoman and arts patron.

== Background ==
Zepter was born in Belgrade, FPR Yugoslavia, and studied literature at the University of Belgrade. In 1997, she founded Madlenianum Opera and Theatre as its single patron, opening the facility in 2005. She also founded the Zepter Museum in the same city. In 2011, she was awarded the Golden Wreath by Serbian Culture Minister Nebojša Bradić, in recognition of her art patronage and her contribution as a benefactor to the development of Serbian culture.

== Personal life ==
On February 21, 1976, she married Philip Zepter. They have a daughter Emma, who they adopted in 2000. The Zepter family lives in Roquebrune-Cap-Martin in the south of France. Their villa formerly known as Villa Aréthuse, the Villa Trianon was built in 1893 at the request of Lord George Montgomery by the Danish architect, Hans-Georg Tersling. She cites Lou Salomé, Colette, Marguerite Yourcenar, Coco Chanel and Peggy Guggenheim as her role models.
