= Aimé Rosso =

French footballer (born 1955)

Personal information
- Date of birth: 5 June 1955 (age 71)
- Place of birth: Saint-Tropez, France
- Height: 1.69 m (5 ft 7 in)
- Position: Forward

Senior career*
Years	Team	Apps	(Gls)
1973–1975	Monaco	6	(0)
1975–1982	Tours	146	(21)
Total		152	(21)
- * Club domestic league appearances and goals

Aimé Rosso (born 5 June 1955) is a French former professional footballer who played as a forward. He played for Monaco and Tours.

== Honours ==
Monaco

- Coupe de France runner-up: 1973–74
