= Ivan Ćurković =

Serbian sports executive and former footballer (born 1944)

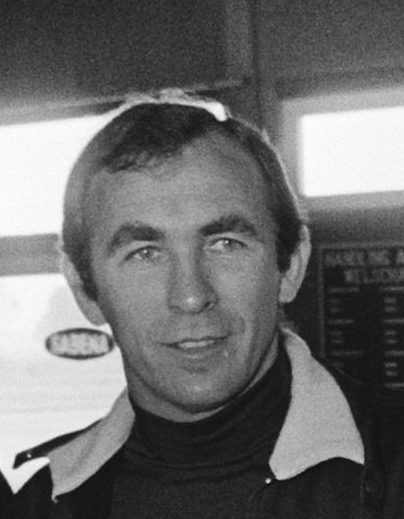
- Ćurković with Saint-Étienne in 1979

President of FK Partizan
- In office 21 December 2015 – 24 October 2016
- Preceded by: Zoran Popović
- Succeeded by: Milorad Vučelić
- In office 1 July 1989 – 26 December 2006
- Preceded by: Špiro Sinovčić
- Succeeded by: Nenad Popović

President of the Olympic Committee of Serbia
- In office 2005–2009
- Preceded by: Philip Zepter
- Succeeded by: Vlade Divac

Personal details
- Born: Ivan Ćurković; 15 March 1944 (age 82) Mostar, Independent State of Croatia
- Height: 1.79 m (5 ft 10 in)
Association football career
- Position: Goalkeeper
Youth career
- 1958–1960: Velež Mostar
Senior career*
Years	Team	Apps	(Gls)
1960–1964	Velež Mostar	87	(0)
1964–1972	Partizan	201	(0)
1972–1981	Saint-Étienne	303	(0)
Total		591	(0)
International career
1963–1970	Yugoslavia	19	(0)
Managerial career
- 1981–1982: France (assistant)
- 2001: FR Yugoslavia (co-manager)
Medal record
Gold medal – first place	Mediterranean Games	1971
- * Club domestic league appearances and goals

Ivan Ćurković (Serbian Cyrillic: Иван Ћурковић, pronounced [ǐʋan tɕǔːrkoʋitɕ]; born 15 March 1944) is a Serbian sports executive and former footballer who played as a goalkeeper.

During his playing career that spanned 21 seasons from 1960 to 1981, Ćurković made over 700 official appearances for three clubs in Yugoslavia and France, winning numerous trophies and reaching the European Cup final on two occasions, with Partizan in 1966 and Saint-Étienne in 1976. He was also capped 19 times by Yugoslavia at senior level between 1963 and 1970.

After hanging up his boots, Ćurković held various high-level administrative positions, including serving as president of the Serbian Olympic Committee and vice-president of the Serbian Football Association. He also served as president of his former club Partizan for almost two decades from 1989 to 2006.

== Club career ==
A talented goalkeeper, Ćurković began at his hometown club Velež Mostar and was officially registered in 1958. He signed his first professional contract at the age of 16. During the 1960–61 Yugoslav First League, Ćurković played 13 (out of 22) games and helped the team narrowly avoid relegation from the top flight. He spent three more seasons with the Rođeni, leading them to a fourth-place finish in 1962–63.

In 1964, Ćurković was transferred to Partizan. He would become the first-choice goalkeeper in his debut season after Milutin Šoškić joined the army to complete his compulsory military service, helping the side win the championship title. During the next season in 1965–66, Ćurković served as a backup to Šoškić through their European Cup campaign that year, as Partizan lost in the final to Real Madrid. He spent a total of eight seasons with the Crno-beli, making 227 appearances across all competitions.

In 1972, Ćurković moved abroad to France and signed with Saint-Étienne. He immediately established himself as the starting goalkeeper and played nine seasons with Les Verts, winning four domestic championship titles (1973–74, 1974–75, 1975–76, and 1980–81), three national cups (1973–74, 1974–75, and 1976–77), and reaching the European Cup final in 1975–76. In total, Ćurković amassed 383 competitive appearances for Saint-Étienne.

== International career ==
At international level, Ćurković earned 19 full caps for Yugoslavia between 1963 and 1970. He participated at the 1964 Summer Olympics in Tokyo. In addition, Ćurković represented Yugoslavia at the 1971 Mediterranean Games, winning a gold medal.

== Post-playing career ==
Between 1989 and 2006, Ćurković served as president of his former club Partizan, establishing a long-lasting partnership with Žarko Zečević (general secretary) and Nenad Bjeković (sporting director).

In May 2001, Ćurković was appointed by the Football Association of FR Yugoslavia as co-manager of the FR Yugoslavia national team alongside Vujadin Boškov and Dejan Savićević, replacing Milovan Đorić after poor results at the start of the 2002 FIFA World Cup qualification.

In July 2005, Ćurković was appointed as acting president of the Olympic Committee of Serbia and Montenegro, replacing Philip Zepter. He officially became president on 8 March 2006. Following the split between the two nations, Ćurković served as president of the Olympic Committee of Serbia until February 2009.

On 23 December 2009, Ćurković was named vice-president of the Football Association of Serbia during the presidential term of Tomislav Karadžić.

== Personal life ==
Born in Mostar, Independent State of Croatia (present-day Bosnia and Herzegovina), Ćurković identifies as a Herzegovinian Croat and a Catholic.

In 1982, Ćurković was granted French citizenship by a decree of President François Mitterrand. He was also a recipient of France's Legion of Honour during a ceremony held in Belgrade on 5 October 2005, in which his former Saint-Étienne teammate Michel Platini presented him the award.

== Career statistics ==
=== Club ===
Appearances and goals by club, season and competition
Club	Season	League			Cup (Note: Includes Yugoslav Cup, Coupe de France)		Continental		Total	
Club	Season	Division	Apps	Goals	Apps	Goals	Apps	Goals	Apps	Goals
Velež Mostar	1960–61	Yugoslav First League	13	0	0	0	—		13	0
Velež Mostar	1961–62	Yugoslav First League	22	0	3	0	—		25	0
Velež Mostar	1962–63	Yugoslav First League	26	0	1	0	—		27	0
Velež Mostar	1963–64	Yugoslav First League	26	0	1	0	—		27	0
Velež Mostar	Total		87	0	5	0	—		92	0
Partizan	1964–65	Yugoslav First League	23	0	1	0	—		24	0
Partizan	1965–66	Yugoslav First League	18	0	2	0	1 (Note: Appearances in European Cup)	0	21	0
Partizan	1966–67	Yugoslav First League	30	0	4	0	—		34	0
Partizan	1967–68	Yugoslav First League	29	0	2	0	4 (Note: Appearances in Inter-Cities Fairs Cup)	0	35	0
Partizan	1968–69	Yugoslav First League	33	0	4	0	—		37	0
Partizan	1969–70	Yugoslav First League	33	0	2	0	2	0	37	0
Partizan	1970–71	Yugoslav First League	17	0	1	0	2	0	20	0
Partizan	1971–72	Yugoslav First League	18	0	1	0	—		19	0
Partizan	Total		201	0	17	0	9	0	227	0
Saint-Étienne	1972–73	French Division 1	38	0	6	0	—		44	0
Saint-Étienne	1973–74	French Division 1	38	0	9	0	—		47	0
Saint-Étienne	1974–75	French Division 1	38	0	8	0	8	0	54	0
Saint-Étienne	1975–76	French Division 1	38	0	1	0	9	0	48	0
Saint-Étienne	1976–77	French Division 1	37	0	10	0	6	0	53	0
Saint-Étienne	1977–78	French Division 1	37	0	3	0	2 (Note: Appearances in European Cup Winners' Cup)	0	42	0
Saint-Étienne	1978–79	French Division 1	36	0	4	0	—		40	0
Saint-Étienne	1979–80	French Division 1	38	0	6	0	8 (Note: Appearances in UEFA Cup)	0	52	0
Saint-Étienne	1980–81	French Division 1	3	0	0	0	0	0	3	0
Saint-Étienne	Total		303	0	47	0	33	0	383	0
Career total			591	0	69	0	42	0	702	0

=== International ===
Appearances and goals by national team and year
National team	Year	Apps	Goals
Yugoslavia	1963	1	0
Yugoslavia	1964	8	0
Yugoslavia	1965	0	0
Yugoslavia	1966	0	0
Yugoslavia	1967	0	0
Yugoslavia	1968	6	0
Yugoslavia	1969	3	0
Yugoslavia	1970	1	0
Total		19	0

== Honours ==
Partizan

- Yugoslav First League: 1964–65
- European Cup runner-up: 1965–66

Saint-Étienne

- French Division 1: 1973–74, 1974–75, 1975–76, 1980–81
- Coupe de France: 1973–74, 1974–75, 1976–77
- European Cup runner-up: 1975–76

Yugoslavia

- Mediterranean Games: 1971

Orders

- Knight of the Legion of Honour: 2005
