= Yvon Chomet =

French footballer (born 1945)

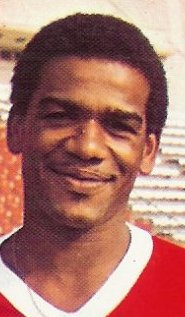
- Chomet with Monaco

Personal information
- Date of birth: 20 August 1945 (age 81)
- Place of birth: Le Carbet, Martinique, France
- Height: 1.78 m (5 ft 10 in)
- Positions: Defender; midfielder

Senior career*
Years	Team	Apps	(Gls)
- Assaut de Saint-Pierre
1970–1972	Aix	30+ (Note: Statistics are incomplete for the 1971–72 season.)	(0+)
1972–1976	Monaco	118	(0)
1976–1977	Aix		
Total		148+	(0+)
- * Club domestic league appearances and goals

Yvon Chomet (born 20 August 1945) is a French former professional footballer who played as defender and midfielder. He notably made 130 appearances for Monaco.

== Honours ==
Monaco

- Coupe de France runner-up: 1973–74
