= Aníbal Tarabini =

Argentine footballer (1941–1997)

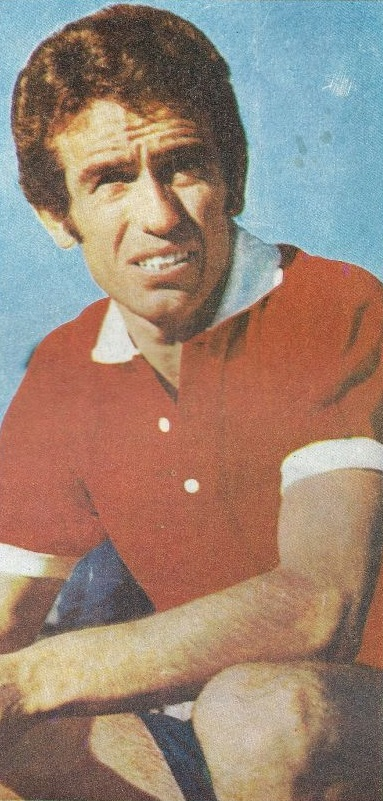

Personal information
- Full name: Aníbal Roberto Tarabini
- Date of birth: August 4, 1941
- Place of birth: La Plata, Argentina
- Date of death: April 21, 1997 (aged 55)
- Place of death: Berazategui, Argentina
- Position: Striker

Senior career*
Years	Team	Apps	(Gls)
1960–1961	Estudiantes de La Plata	11	(2)
1962–1965	Temperley		
1966–1970	Independiente	163	(77)
1971	Boca Juniors	18	(3)
1971–1973	Torreón	70	(23)
1973–1974	Monaco	13	(5)

International career
- Argentina
- * Club domestic league appearances and goals as of April 2008

Aníbal Roberto Tarabini (4 August 1941 – 21 April 1997) was an Argentine football player who played for the Argentina national team and was part of the squad for the 1966 World Cup. At club level, he won two league championships with Independiente in 1967 and 1970.

== Biography ==
Tarabini made his debut in 1960 for Estudiantes de La Plata, in 1961 he joined 2nd division Temperley where he played until 1965.

In 1966 he joined Independiente where he is said to have played his best football and was part of the squad that won the Nacional in 1967 and the Metropolitano in 1970.

In 1971 Tarabini joined Boca Juniors where he played a total of 22 games in all competitions for the club, scoring three goals. He then went to Mexico where he played for (now defunct) Club de Fútbol Torreón until 1973.

Tarabini's last club was AS Monaco of France, he retired in 1974.

== Later years ==
After his retirement as a player Tarabini went on to become the field assistant of José Omar Pastoriza. On April 21, 1997, he died in a traffic accident in Berazategui, Greater Buenos Aires.

== Family ==
His daughter Patricia is a professional tennis player who won a bronze medal at the 2004 Summer Olympics.

== Titles ==
Season	Team	Title
1967 Nacional	Independiente	Argentine Primera
1970 Metropolitano	Independiente	Argentine Primera
1974 Coupe de France	Monaco	Coupe de France (finalist)
