= César Ruminski =

French footballer (1924–2009)

Personal information
- Full name: César-Jean Ruminski
- Date of birth: 13 June 1924
- Place of birth: Douai, France
- Date of death: 14 May 2009 (aged 84)
- Place of death: Lisieux, France
- Position: Goalkeeper

Youth career
- 1941–1942: Olympique de Reims

Senior career*
Years	Team	Apps	(Gls)
1942–1946	Reims		
1946–1947	SC Douai		
1947–1952	Le Havre	139	(4)
1952–1954	Lille	92	(0)
1955–1956	CA Lisieux		

International career
1952–1954	France	7	(0)

Managerial career
- 1955-1961: CA Lisieux
- * Club domestic league appearances and goals

César-Jean Ruminski (13 June 1924 − 14 May 2009) was a French football goalkeeper. He was of Polish descent.

At the end of his playing career he became player coach of CA Lisieux in 1955 for a season, then staying as coach until 1961.
