= CA Lisieux =

- Full name: CA Lisieux Football Pays d'Auge
- Founded: 1920
- Ground: Stade Louis-Bielman
- Capacity: 1,500
- Chairman: Lilian Lebarbey
- Manager: Antoine Husson
- League: Régional 1
Home colours

CA Lisieux is a French football club based in Lisieux.

== History ==
The club was formed on January 12, 1920 by its founding president, Eugène Tribouillard.

The club spent its first 50 years in the departmental and regional leagues, until 1971 when it was promoted to the newly formed Division 3. the club spent 3 years in division 3, before dropping back down to the regional league. The 1977-78 season saw the club retain promotion back to Division 3, and the club manage to stay in the 3rd to 5th tier of the French football league system for 18 years. After being relegated to the regional league at the end of the 1995-96 season, the club has remained at this level since.

== Ground ==
The club play there home games at Stade Louis-Bielman. The stadium was built in teh 1920s and was originally called stade des Marronniers. It was renamed after Swiss national Louis Bielman, who during the second world war was in charge of the civil defense post on behalf of the Red Cross. He became president of the Lisieux Athletic Club (CAL) in 1941 and teh stadium was renamed in his name after hi death.

The Stadium has a stand that contains 500 seats and its overall capacity is 1,500.

== Honour ==
- Division 4 Gr.B (2) 1980-81,1982-83
- DH Normandie (2) 1970-71, 1977-78
- Regional 2 Normandie group C (1) 2024-25
- Coupe de Basse-Normandie (2) 1985-86, 2009-10

== Notable players ==
- (Mauritania) (France) Oumar N'Diaye
- (Haiti) (France) Hervé Bazile
- (France) César Ruminski
- (France) Didier Notheaux
- (France) Jacques Santini

== Notable Managers ==
- (France) César Ruminski
- (France) Didier Notheaux
- (France) Jacques Santini
- (France) Alain Merchadier
