= André Lannoy =

French footballer (born 1945)

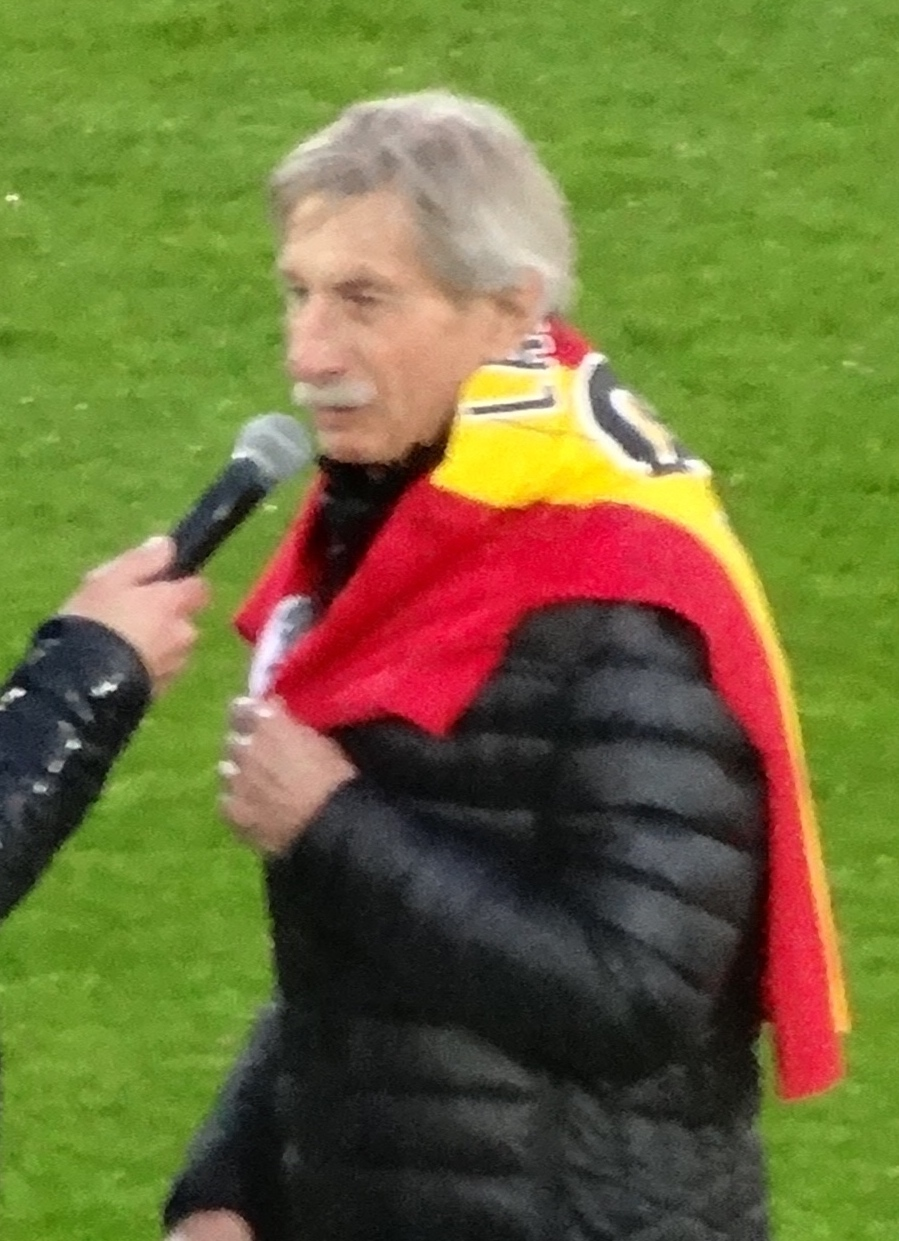
- Lannoy in April 2018

Personal information
- Date of birth: 1 March 1945 (age 80)
- Place of birth: Calais, France
- Height: 1.80 m (5 ft 11 in)
- Position: Goalkeeper

Senior career*
Years	Team	Apps	(Gls)
1963–1964	Calais		
1964–1967	Mouscron		
1967–1976	Lens	229+ (Note: Statistics are missing for the 1969–70 season.)	(0+)
- * Club domestic league appearances and goals

André Lannoy (born 1 March 1945) is a French former professional footballer who played as a goalkeeper. He played the majority of his career at Lens.

== Honours ==
Lens

- Division 2: 1972–73
- Coupe de France runner-up: 1974–75
