= Glòria Bordons =

Spanish art historian

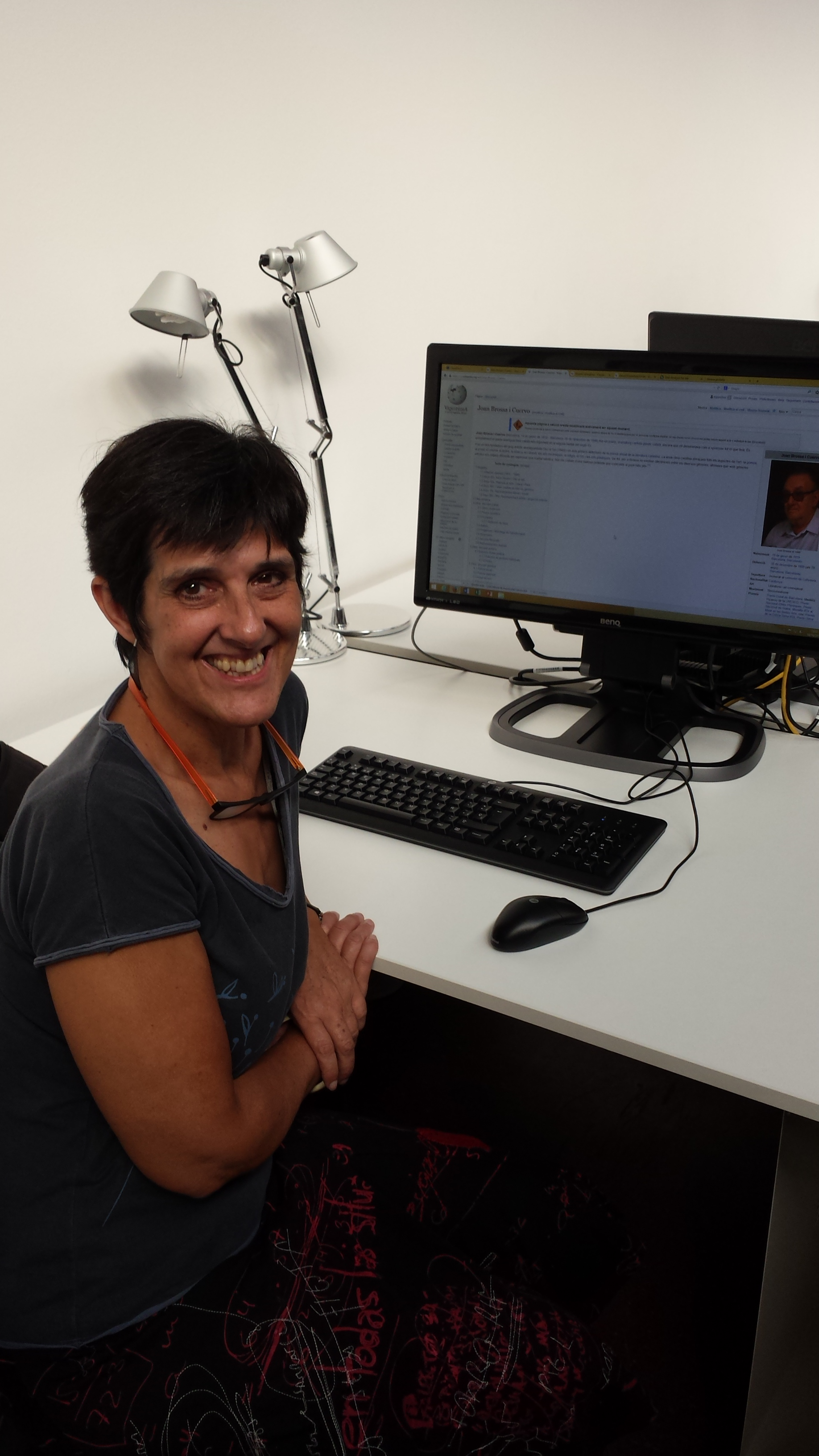
Glòria Bordons de Porrata-Doria

Glòria Bordons de Porrata-Doria (born 22 September 1953 in Barcelona) is a Spanish art historian, pedagogue, and philologist. She is considered an expert on the works of Joan Brossa, having published three books on his works.
