= Casimir Zuraszek =

French footballer (born 1949)

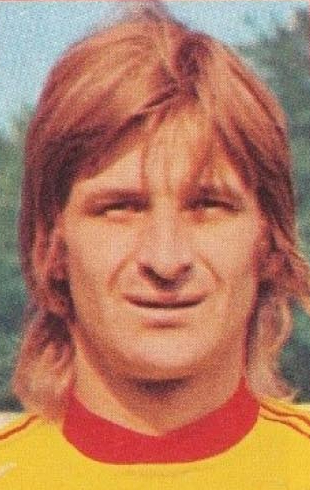
- Zuraszek with Lens

Personal information
- Birth name: Kazimierz Juraszek
- Date of birth: 26 February 1949 (age 77)
- Place of birth: Mazingarbe, France
- Height: 1.83 m (6 ft 0 in)
- Position: Forward

Youth career
- Lens

Senior career*
Years	Team	Apps	(Gls)
1967–1976	Lens	172+ (Note: Statistics are missing for the 1969–70 season.)	(57+)
1976–1977	Hazebrouck	32	(10)
1978–1981	Thonon	58+ (Note: Statistics are missing for the 1978–79 season.)	(8+)
1981–1985	Cholet		
- * Club domestic league appearances and goals

Casimir "Cajou" Zuraszek (birth name Kazimierz Juraszek; born 26 February 1949) is a French former professional footballer who played as a forward.

== After football ==
After he retired from football, Zuraszek became responsible for financial affairs in the communal center of social action in the city of Cholet. He also worked as an educator in several amateur football clubs from 1982 to 2017. At the age of 68, Zuraszek was a coach at a "small" amateur club.

== Honours ==
Lens

- Division 2: 1972–73
- Coupe de France runner-up: 1974–75
