= Alfred Kaiser =

French footballer (born 1947)

Personal information
- Date of birth: 6 June 1947 (age 78)
- Place of birth: Schirrhein, France
- Height: 1.72 m (5 ft 8 in)
- Position: Forward

Senior career*
| Years | Team | Apps | (Gls) |
| 1966–1967 | FC Konstanz | | |
| 1967–1968 | SC 04 Tuttlingen | | |
| 1968–1973 | Patro Eisden | | |
| 1973–1974 | Diest | | |
| 1974–1977 | Lens | 79 | (21) |
| 1977–1978 | Paris FC | 18 | (2) |
| 1978–1979 | Haguenau | | |
| 1979–1983 | Neudorf | | |
- * Club domestic league appearances and goals

Alfred Kaiser (born 6 June 1947) is a French former professional footballer who played as a forward.

== Honours ==
Lens

- Coupe de France runner-up: 1974–75
