= Robert Héliès =

French football referee and player (1927–2019)

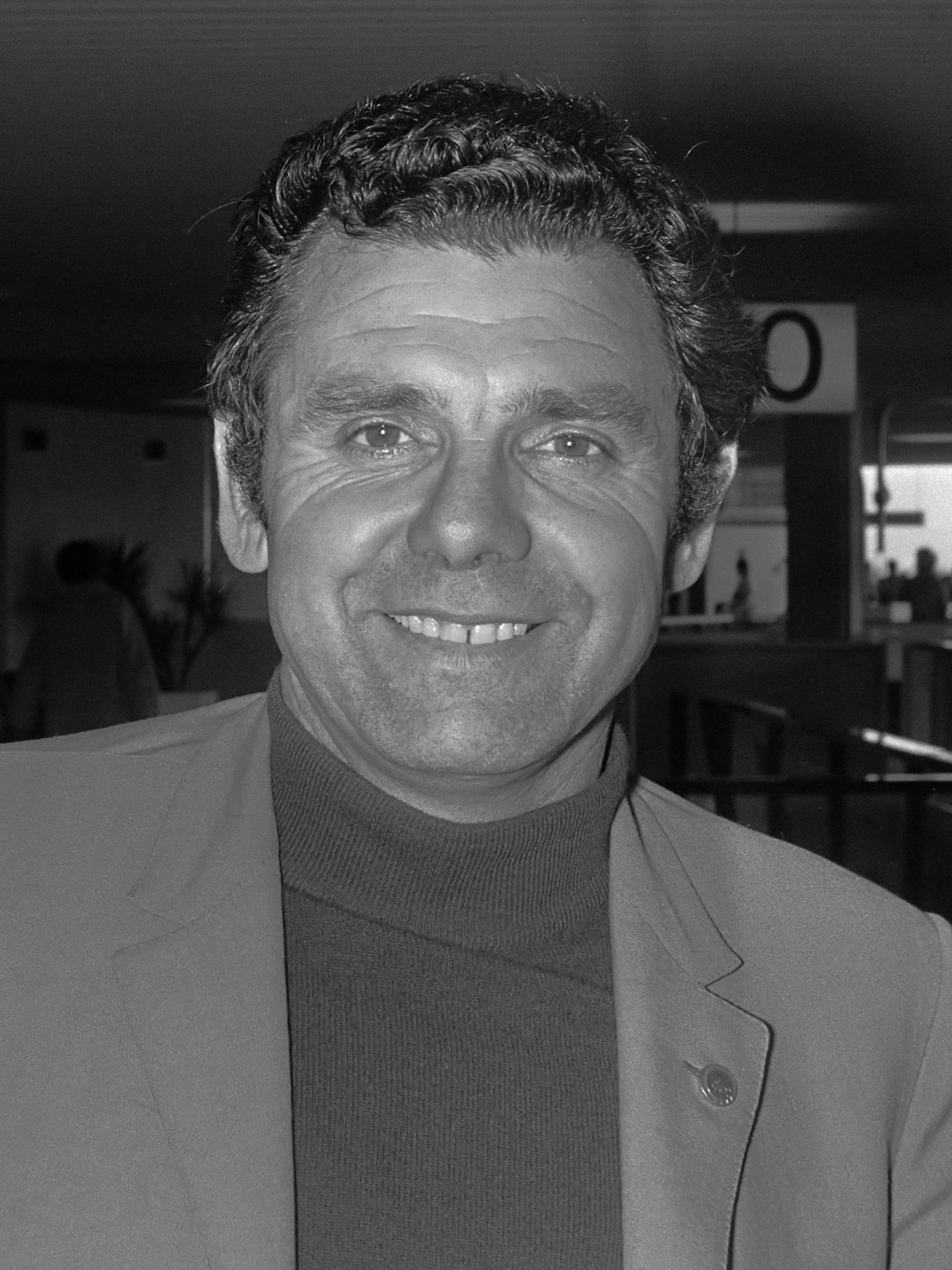
- Héliès in 1972

Personal information
- Full name: Robert Georges Jean Héliès
- Date of birth: 8 February 1927
- Place of birth: Brest, France
- Date of death: 19 February 2019 (aged 92)
- Place of death: Grasse, France
- Position: Goalkeeper

Senior career*
Years	Team	Apps	(Gls)
1951–1952	Saint-Étienne	8	(0)
Refereeing career
Domestic
Years	League	Role
1962–1977	Division 1	Referee
International
Years	League	Role
1966–1977	FIFA listed	Referee
- * Club domestic league appearances and goals

Robert Georges Jean Héliès (8 February 1927 – 19 February 2019) was a French football referee and player. In his playing days, he was a goalkeeper.

== Playing career ==
Héliès played 8 matches in 1951–52 French Division 1 for Saint-Étienne.

== Refereeing career ==
After his playing career, Héliès became a referee, and was member of FIFA from 1966 to 1977. He officiated a total of 13 international matches, with 3 being in World Cup qualifying, 5 in Euro qualifying, 4 friendlies, and a single match at the 1976 Olympic Games.

In club football, Héliès officiated some UEFA competition matches. He was the referee for 7 Champions League games, 12 UEFA Cup games, and 10 Cup Winners' Cup games. He also refereed 270 Division 1 matches from 1962 to 1977, and officiated 2 Coupe de France finals in 1970 and 1975.
