= Didier Notheaux =

French football coach (1948–2021)

Personal information
- Full name: Didier Notheaux
- Date of birth: 4 February 1948
- Place of birth: Déville-lès-Rouen, France
- Date of death: 18 August 2021 (aged 73)
- Position: Defender

Youth career
- 1958–1960: Déville-lès-Rouen
- 1960–?: Rouen

Senior career*
Years	Team	Apps	(Gls)
?–1974	Rouen		
1974–1976	Lens		
1976–1977	Rennes		
1977–1980	Rouen		
1980–1981	CA Lisieux		

Managerial career
- CA Lisieux
- 1983–1988: Le Havre
- 1988–1990: Mulhouse
- 1990–1991: Reims
- 1991–1993: Rennes
- 1993–1995: ASOA Valence
- 1995–1996: Sochaux
- Saint-Denis Saint-Leu
- 1998–1999: Burkina Faso
- 2000–2003: ASOA Valence
- 2007: Benin
- 2007: Burkina Faso
- * Club domestic league appearances and goals

Didier Notheaux (4 February 1948 – 18 August 2021) was a French football player and coach.

Prior to his coaching career, he played mainly for FC Rouen, RC Lens and Rennes. He then coached numerous French clubs and already had a brief stint for Burkina Faso. He led the team to the 2000 African Cup of Nations, but was fired just before the tournament. He came back to Africa in 2007.
