= Alain Merchadier =

French footballer (born 1952)

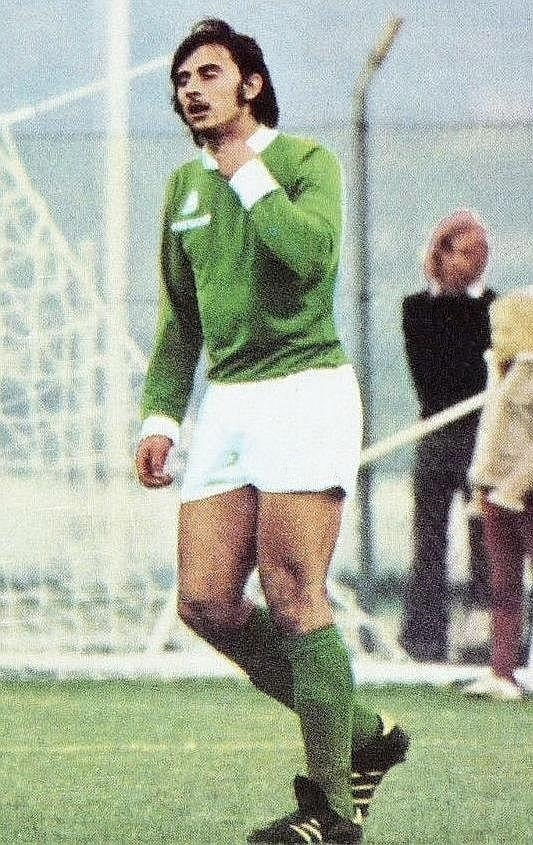
- Merchadier in 1972

Personal information
- Date of birth: 13 March 1952 (age 74)
- Place of birth: Toulouse, France
- Position: Defender

Senior career*
Years	Team	Apps	(Gls)
1969–1978	AS Saint-Étienne		
1978–1980	AS Nancy		
1980–1981	AAJ Blois		

International career
1973–1975	France	5	(0)

Managerial career
- 1983–1984: AS Montferrand
- 1984–1985: Sud Nivernais Imphy Decize
- 1985–1986: CA Lisieux
- 1988-1990: FC Saint-Lô Manche
- * Club domestic league appearances and goals

Alain Merchadier (born 13 March 1952) is a French retired professional footballer who played as a defender.

His playing career was spent mostly at AS Saint-Étienne.
