= Philip Zepter =

Serbian businessman and entrepreneur (born 1950)

- Филип Цептер
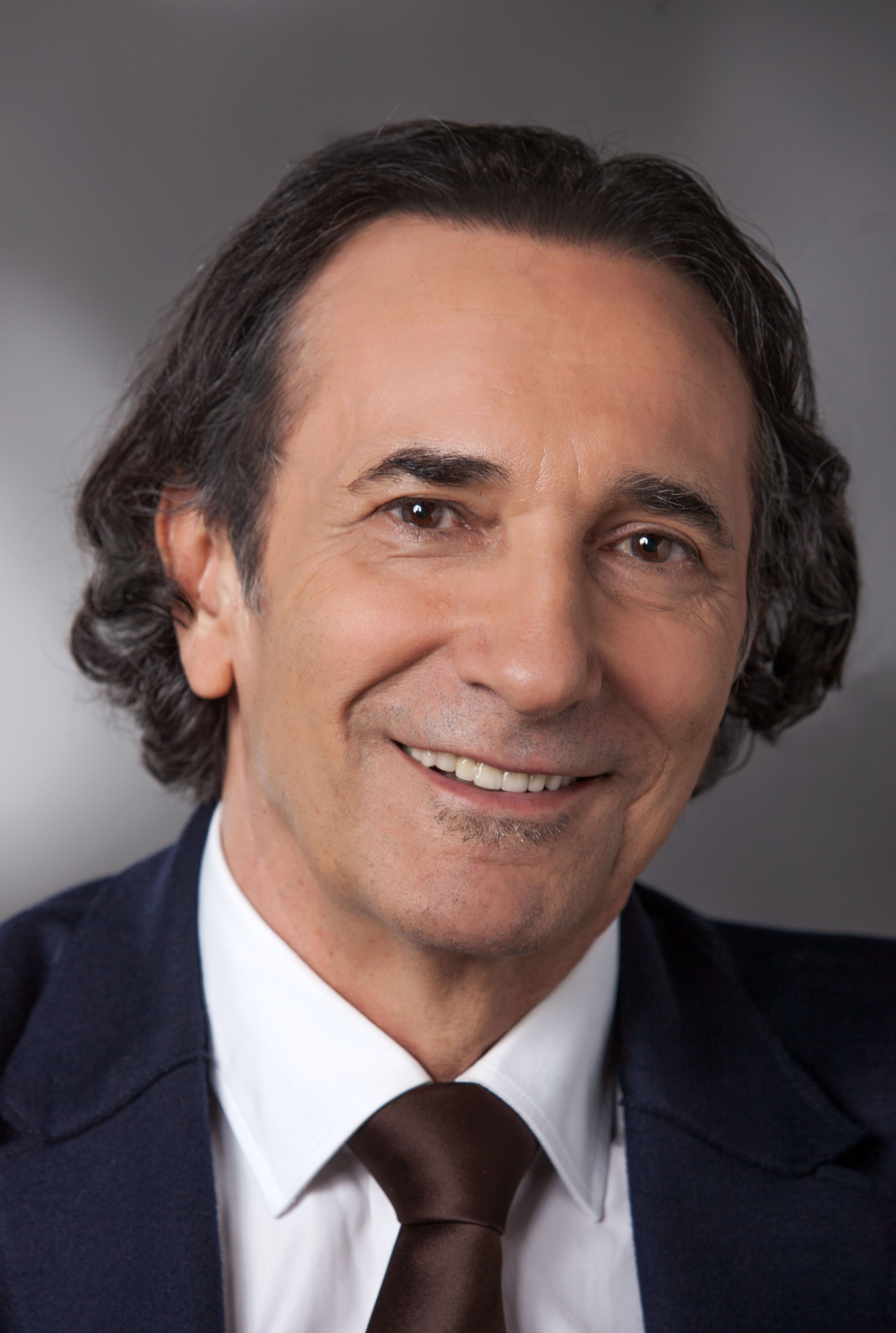
- Zepter in 2015

President of the Olympic Committee of Serbia and Montenegro (OKSCG)
- In office 2005–2005
- Preceded by: Dragan Kićanović
- Succeeded by: Ivan Ćurković

Personal details
- Born: Milan Janković; 23 November 1950 (age 75) Bosanska Dubica, PR Bosnia, FPR Yugoslavia
- Occupation: Entrepreneur; sports administrator
- Education: University of Belgrade
- Known for: founder of Zepter International
- Spouse: Madlena Zepter
- Children: Emma Zepter

Philip Zepter (Serbian: Филип Цептер, romanized: Filip Cepter; born Milan Janković; Serbian Cyrillic: Милан Јанковић; 23 November 1950) is a Serbian entrepreneur. He is the president of the Zepter International Group.

== Early years and education ==
Philip Zepter is a Serb born in Bosanska Dubica (in modern-day Republika Srpska, Bosnia and Herzegovina) on 23 November 1950. He is the son of Milisav Janković and Nada Reljan. He is the youngest of three sons, his brothers are Philip and Gojko.

Zepter's education was strict, focusing on mathematics and sports. He completed his secondary education at the secondary school of Bosanska Dubica, then went to study economics, and graduated with a master's degree from the University of Belgrade Faculty of Economics. He is fluent in Serbian, German, and English.

On 21 February 1976, he married Madlena Horvat, professor of literature. They have a daughter Emma, born in 2000.

== Professional life ==
His professional life began in Belgrade in 1976, with an international transport company Transkop International. He stayed there for two years as Commercial Director.

In 1986, he founded his company Zepter International in Linz, Austria. The company produces and makes kitchen utensils in stainless steel alloy. Today, the company has an annual turnover of around one billion euros, and has subsidiaries in some 40 countries. The group has extended its field of activity to the medical and cosmetic world as well as to other areas: insurance, banking, real estate and hotels.

In 1990, the Zepter family moved to Monaco, a company under local law was created, CORPO SAM, which designs and carries out marketing, promotion and events for the group's products around the world.

The Zepter family lives in Roquebrune-Cap-Martin in the south of France. Their villa formerly known as Villa Aréthuse, the Villa Trianon was built in 1893 at the request of Lord George Montgomery by the Danish architect, Hans-Georg Tersling.

== Political activities ==
=== Relationship with political power ===
Philip Zepter was one of the first and among the most important supporters of Zoran Đinđić, Prime Minister of Serbia from 2001 to 2003 and promoter of important economic and liberal political reforms in his country.

Zepter continued his active support for Đinđić's pro-reform, democratic agenda, once saying that Đinđić was "a glimpse of bright light in the general hopelessness."

=== Litigation with the International Crisis Group ===
In 2003, one of the reports of the International Crisis Group attributed the deceleration of Serbian reform to "the financial structures of the Milošević era" which had become "a new oligarchy" financing various parties and influencing, de facto, government decisions. It mentions the name of Philip Zepter who is said to be among those who have benefited from "special informal monopolies" in exchange for their support for the Milošević regime.

A defamation action was brought before the American courts. On May 10, 2016, the D.C. Circuit dismissed the applicant. According to Judge Rogers, Philip Zepter was indeed an advisor and financial support to Đinđić.

Evidence shows that he was "willingly" involved in a reform process in Serbia. Moreover, the plaintiff does not deny having paid more than US$100,000 to a lobbyist to help the government of Đinđić to improve its relations with the United States, “efforts which led (...) to cancel two-thirds of Serbia's external debt”. The allegations of attempted extortion on the part of the author of the writing were also dismissed.

== Patronage ==
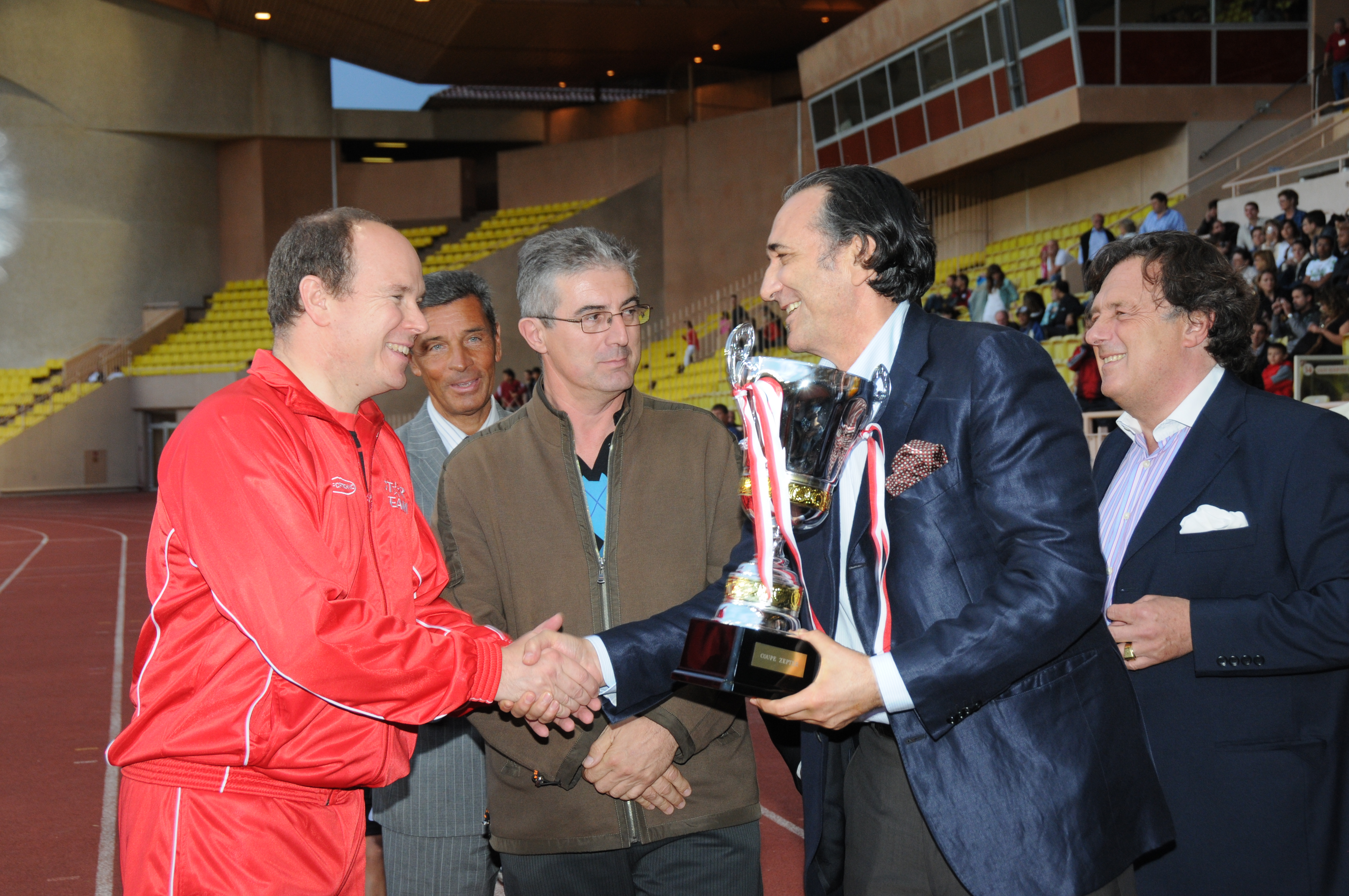
Albert II receiving from the hands of Philip Zepter with the Zepter Cup in Louis II Stadium, Monaco.

The Zepter Group has been involved for several decades in sponsorship encompassing sports, culture and charity. Among these, the Formula 1 world championship, the offshore championship, numerous car rallies, the ice hockey worlds, numerous ATP tennis tournaments, the Cannes festival, the construction and management of the Europe's only private opera house - The Belgrade Madlenianum, the Madeleine Zepter Foundation, which grants and supports various projects, the Zepter Museum (Belgrade) which constitutes a collection of works from 1950 to the present day, the literary prize Madeleine Zepter, the Zepter International Design Award, the publishing house Zepter Book World, the first auction house in Belgrade (MadlArt), the Young Chef Prize.

In Monaco, a partnership with the Formula 1 Monaco Grand-Prix, the Golden League Athletic Meeting Zepter Herculis, the Monte Carlo Open tennis tournament, the Monte Carlo rally of new energies, the Zepter Monte-Carlo pro celebrities golf tournament, the IAF Monte-Carlo Master class, the Yacht Show the Monte Carlo World Music awards.

== Awards/Recognitions ==
=== Main recognitions received by Philip Zepter ===
Philip Zepter was named Cavaliere in the Order of Merit for Work of the Italian Republic in 1997 for his outstanding contribution to the development of the industry in that country.

In recognition of the benefits brought to Ukraine and its population, the small planet N6589 discovered in 1985 by Ljudmila Ivamovna Cernih and Nikolaj Stepanovic Cernih of the Crimean Astrophysical Observatory, was named and registered in 2000 under the reference N6589 -JANKOVIC (ZEPTER). by the International Astronomical Union. In the same year he was appointed to the Academy of Sciences (Ecology Section) of the Republic of Ukraine.

In 2011, Philip Zepter was awarded the Ellis Island Medal of Honor (United States of America) for his philanthropic actions in favor of health and the improvement of the human condition.

=== Main awards received by the Zepter International Group (59) ===
- 1994: Organization for Cardiovascular Protection (Poland). Prize awarded for his fight against cholesterol.
- 1994/1995/1996/1997/2010: "Golden Mercury" Prize, Italy, awarded for its technological advances and the originality of its products.
- 2000: "Golden Europe Award" awarded in Madrid (Spain) for the quality of its products and its commercial success.
- 2000: “International Europe Award for Quality” awarded in Paris (France).
- 2002: "Golden BIATEC D'Or" Prize awarded in Bratislava (Slovakia), pg.3 (60).
- 2014: “Kitchen Innovation of the Year, Best Consumer Friendly Product Award” awarded in Frankfurt (Germany).

Civic offices
| Preceded by Dragan Kićanović | President of the Olympic Committee of Serbia and Montenegro; 2005 | Succeeded by Ivan Ćurković |
