= Zepter International =

Swiss consumer goods enterprise

- Type: Private
- Industry: Consumer products
- Founded: 1986; 40 years ago
- Headquarters: Sihleggstrasse 23, Wollerau, Schwyz, Switzerland
- Number of locations: 60
- Area served: Worldwide
- Key people: Philip Zepter (Founder, President, CEO & Chairman); Madlena Zepter
- Products: Cooking dishes, Cleaning systems, Purification systems, Medical products, Cosmetics, Exclusive items
- Website: zepter.com

Zepter International is a Swiss multinational consumer goods enterprise, which produces, sells and distributes consumer goods through direct sales and through stores. Zepter's products are manufactured in its several factories based in Germany, Italy, Switzerland and China. It was established in Linz, Austria in 1986 by Serbian businessman Philip Zepter.

== History ==
In the 1980s, Philip Zepter along with his wife left Belgrade and moved to Austria. There, Zepter worked as distributor of German kitchen utensil manufacturer AMC International AG and soon became one of the company's executives. After five years of working in AMC International AG, he invented special utensil cover and patented as "Zepter utensils". In 1986, Zepter along with his wife founded Zepter International and in the following years made a breakthrough in the market.

Zepter International began distributing worldwide stainless steel cookware and tableware accessories, manufactured in its own plant in Milan, Italy since 1990. In 1996, Zepter Group acquired two companies, based in Switzerland, and thus branched out into the markets of light therapy medical devices (by the purchase of Bioptron AG, Wollerau and cosmetics (through Intercosmetica Neuchâtel SA, Neuchâtel).

After these investments the company's headquarters moved to Switzerland. Later on "Zepter Finance Holding AG" was established, providing services in the fields of private pensions, health care, insurance and property. As of 2016, Zepter International has operations in more than 60 countries worldwide.

As of 2024, the key product lines offered by Zepter International include Health, Optics, Kitchenware, Homeware and Fashion.

== Sponsorship ==
Zepter were a prominent sports sponsor in the late 1990s into the early 2000s. In Formula One, Zepter were a partner of Arrows F1 Team and Jordan Grand Prix, alongside sponsorship of the Monaco, Brazil and Canadian Grand Prix. Elsewhere in motorsports, the company supported Serbian racing drivers through the Zepter Racing project, providing opportunities for drivers such as Andrej Kulundžić, Andrej Pavicevic, and Milovan Vesnić to compete in international racing series. Furthermore, Zepter sponsored the F1 Powerboat World Championship from 2000-2009, the Ice Hockey World Championship from 1999-2010, were an official partner of FIBA from 2003-2011 and sponsored a variety of tennis tournaments, including the Monte-Carlo Masters, between 1997 and 1999.

== Gallery ==
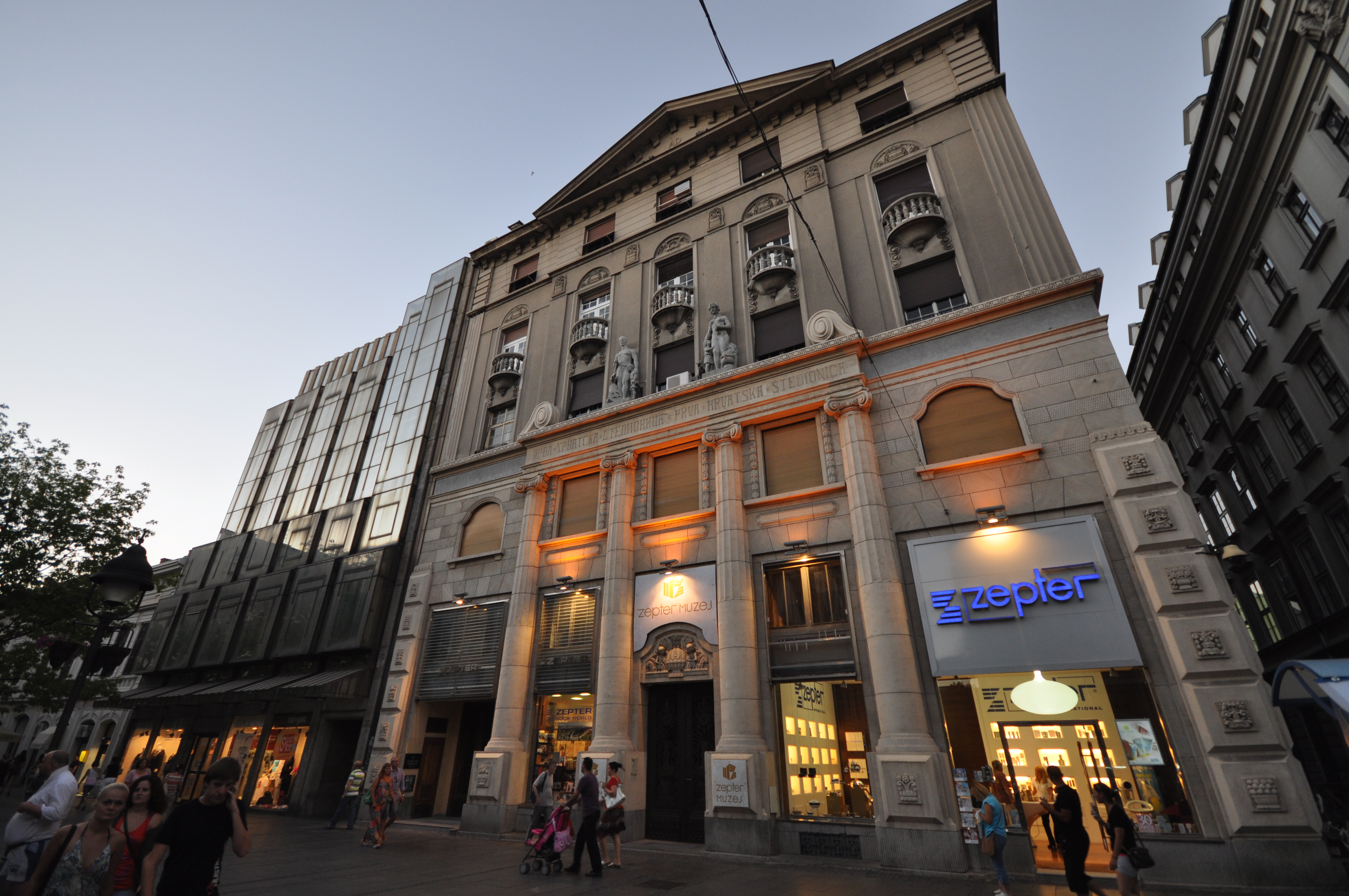
Zepter museum in Belgrade, Serbia

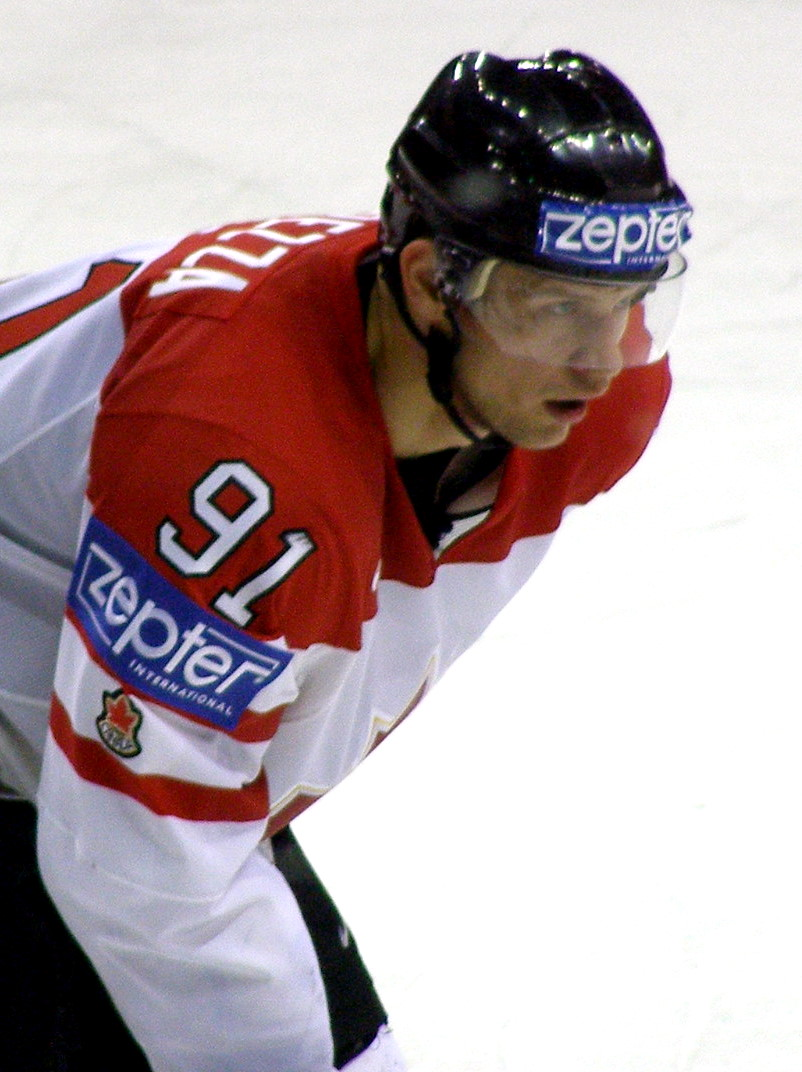
Jason Spezza with a Zepter sponsor on his uniform

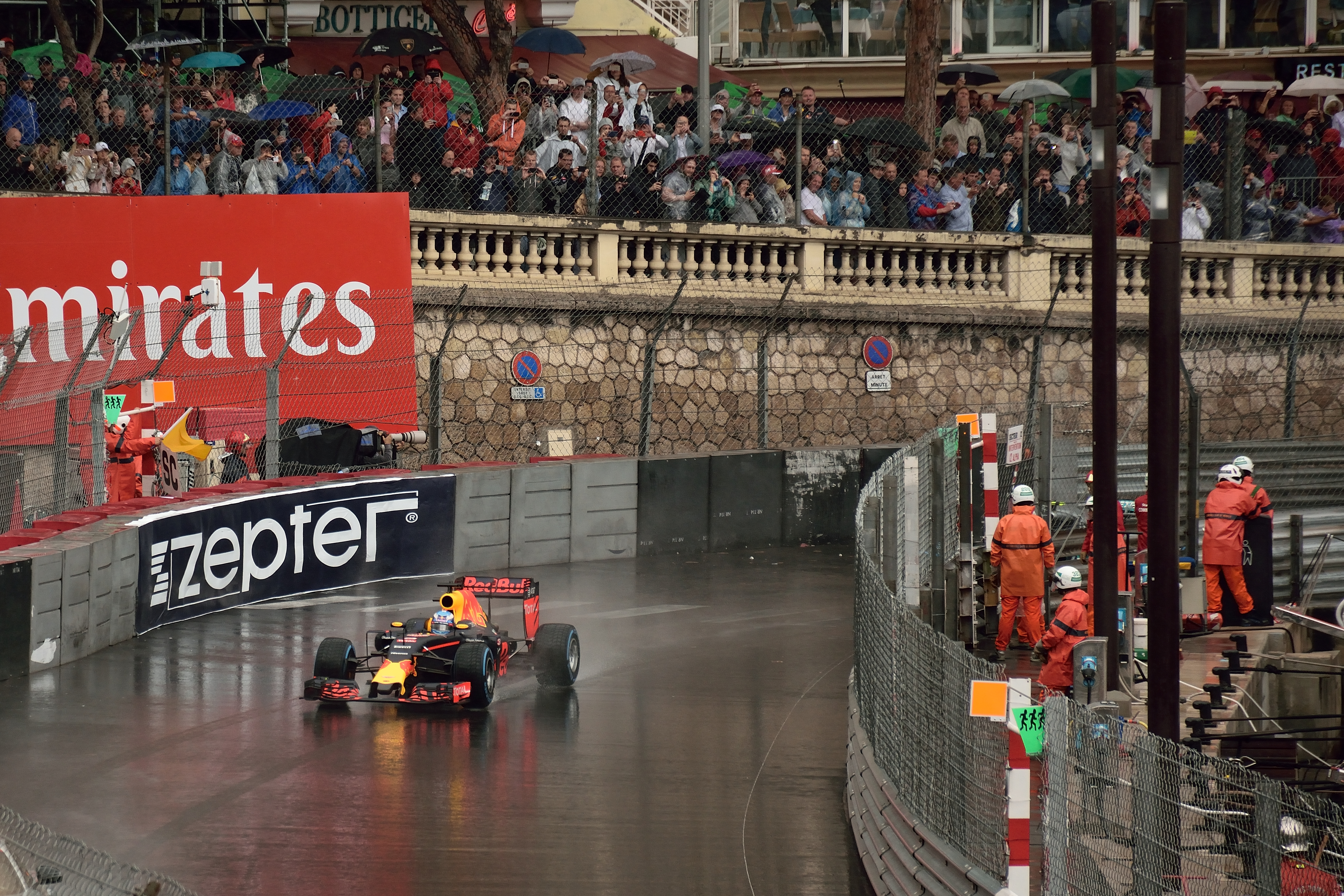
Daniel Ricciardo passing Zepter branding at the 2016 Monaco Grand Prix
