= 1973–74 Coupe de France =

Tournament details
- Country: France

The 1973–74 Coupe de France was the 57th Coupe de France, France's annual national football cup competition. It was won by AS Saint-Étienne, who defeated AS Monaco FC in the final.

== Round of 16 ==
Team 1	Agg.	Team 2	1st leg	2nd leg
Angers SCO (D1)	2–4	AS Saint-Étienne (D1)	2–0	0–4
FC Nantes (D1)	2–0	RC Strasbourg (D1)	1–0	1–0
FC Metz (D1)	1–4	Paris SG (D2)	0–2	1–2
US Toulouse (D2)	1–9	Stade de Reims (D1)	1–4	0–5
AS Cannes (D2)	2–7	Olympique Lyonnais (D1)	1–2	1–5
FC Rouen (D2)	1–6	AS Monaco (D1)	0–3	1–3
AC Ajaccio (D2)	3–4	FC Sochaux-Montbéliard (D1)	2–3	1–1
SC Bastia (D1)	6–2	Stade Lavallois (D2)	3–1	3–1

== Quarter-finals ==
Team 1	Agg.	Team 2	1st leg	2nd leg
Olympique Lyonnais (D1)	4–4 (3–4 p)	FC Sochaux-Montbéliard (D1)	4–2	0–2
Stade de Reims (D1)	7–2	Paris SG (D2)	5–0	2–2
AS Monaco (D1)	2–1	SC Bastia (D1)	2–0	0–1
AS Saint-Étienne (D1)	3–2	FC Nantes (D1)	2–1	1–1

== Semi-finals ==
31 May 1974

Saint-Étienne (1)	1–0	Reims (1)
Bathenay 49'

Parc des Princes, Paris
Attendance: 46,191
Referee: René Vigliani

31 May 1974

Monaco (1)	1–0	Sochaux (1)
Onnis 50'

Stadium Municipal, Toulouse
Attendance: 10,000
Referee: Robert Wurtz

== Final ==
8 June 1974

Saint-Étienne	2–1	Monaco
Synaeghel 44'; Merchadier 61'		Onnis 65'

Parc des Princes, Paris
Attendance: 45,813
Referee: Achille Verbecke
