= Christian Synaeghel =

French footballer (born 1951)

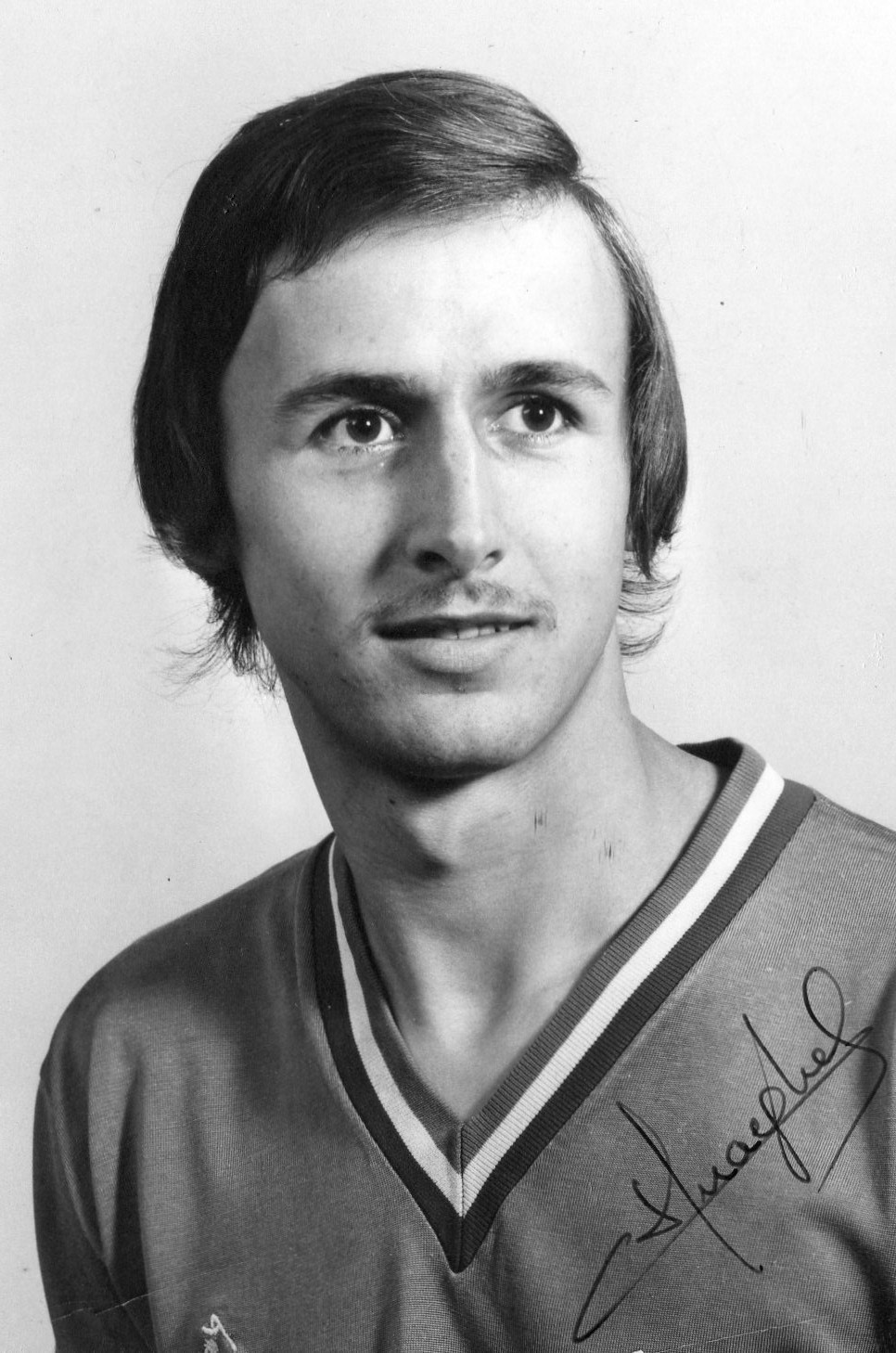

Personal information
- Date of birth: 28 January 1951 (age 75)
- Place of birth: Leffrinckoucke, France
- Height: 1.74 m (5 ft 8 1/2 in)
- Position: Midfielder

Senior career*
Years	Team	Apps	(Gls)
1969–1978	Saint-Étienne		
1978–1982	FC Metz	80	(8)

International career
1974–1977	France	5	(0)
- * Club domestic league appearances and goals

Christian Synaeghel (born 28 January 1951) is a French retired professional football midfielder.
