= 1974–75 Coupe de France =

Tournament details
- Country: France

The Coupe de France 1974–75 was its 58th edition. It was won by AS Saint-Étienne which defeated RC Lens in the Final.

== Round of 16 ==
| Team 1 | Agg. | Team 2 | 1st leg | 2nd leg |
|---|---|---|---|---|
| FC Sochaux-Montbéliard (D1) | 0–5 | Paris SG (D1) | 0–3 | 0–2 |
| Angers SCO (D1) | 2–1 | Troyes AF (D1) | 0–0 | 2–1 |
| Olympique de Marseille (D1) | 2–1 | Lille OSC (D1) | 2–0 | 0–1 |
| FC Metz (D1) | 6–2 | Valenciennes FC (D2) | 2–0 | 4–2 |
| AS Nancy (D2) | 3–4 | AS Saint-Étienne (D1) | 1–1 | 2–3 |
| RC Strasbourg (D1) | 6–3 | FC Martigues (D2) | 4–2 | 2–1 |
| RC Lens (D1) | 6–2 | Sporting Toulon Var (D2) | 3–1 | 3–1 |
| Stade Lavallois (D2) | 2–7 | SC Bastia (D1) | 1–0 | 1–7 |

== Quarter-finals ==
| Team 1 | Agg. | Team 2 | 1st leg | 2nd leg |
|---|---|---|---|---|
| Olympique de Marseille (D1) | 2–4 | Paris SG (D1) | 2–2 | 0–2 |
| FC Metz (D1) | 5–6 | RC Lens (D1) | 4–3 | 1–3 |
| SC Bastia (D1) | 2–0 | Angers SCO (D1) | 1–0 | 1–0 |
| AS Saint-Étienne (D1) | 3–1 | RC Strasbourg (D1) | 2–0 | 1–1 |

== Semi-finals ==
7 June 1975

| Saint-Étienne (1) | 2–0 | Bastia (1) |
|---|---|---|
| Sarramagna 60'; H. Revelli 80' |

Parc des Princes, Paris
Attendance: 45,927
Referee: Georges Konrath

7 June 1975

| Lens (1) | 3–2 (a.e.t.) | Paris Saint-Germain (1) |
|---|---|---|
| Faber 18' (pen.), 84'; Zuraszek 100' | | M'Pelé 32'; Laposte 82' |

Stade Auguste-Delaune, Reims
Attendance: 23,249
Referee: René Vigliani

== Final ==
14 June 1975

| Saint-Étienne | 2–0 | Lens |
|---|---|---|
| Piazza 68'; Larqué 79' |

Parc des Princes, Paris
Attendance: 44,725
Referee: Robert Helies
