= List of France national football team captains =

The France national football team (French: Equipe de France) represents the nation of France in international association football. It is fielded by the French Football Federation (FFF) (French: Fédération Française de Football) and competes as a member of the Union of European Football Associations (UEFA). The team played its first official international match on 1 May 1904 against Belgium. Since its first competitive match, more than 800 players have made at least one international appearance for the team. Of them, 105 have served as captain of the national team. This list contains football (soccer) players who have served as captain of the France national team and is listed according to their number of matches captained.

The France national team's record appearance-maker as captain is Hugo Lloris, who led the team out 121 times during his 145-cap tenure, which lasted for over a decade. Didier Deschamps is the most successful France captain, having worn the armband in team victories at the 1998 FIFA World Cup and UEFA Euro 2000. The Bayonne-born midfielder surpassed the previous record-holder of the France captaincy, midfielder Michel Platini, in the team's semi-final match at the latter competition. Platini became the first France captain to win a major international competition after leading the team in the 1984 European Football Championship. Aside from Deschamps and Platini, only three other players have captained France on over 40 occasions: defenders Roger Marche and Marcel Desailly, and goalkeeper Hugo Lloris. Marche is one of two French captains to lead the team at two FIFA World Cup competitions. Desailly captained the team to victories at the 2001 and 2003 editions of the FIFA Confederations Cup. He is one of four players to be sent off in a FIFA World Cup final, one of the other three being fellow France captain Zinedine Zidane. Lloris captained France to victory at the 2018 FIFA World Cup and to the final of UEFA Euro 2016 and the 2022 FIFA World Cup. The current captain of the national team is Kylian Mbappe.

== History ==
The first captain of the France national team was Fernand Canelle, who captained the national team in its first international match against Belgium on 1 May 1904. Canelle went on to captain France only once more in a 7–0 defeat to Belgium in 1905. The team's next captain was Pierre Allemane, who had previously captained a team representing France at the 1900 Summer Olympics. However, this occurred when the team was under the supervision of the Union des Sociétés Françaises de Sports Athlétiques (USFSA), a federation sports union that supported amateur sport. Under the Fédération Internationale de Football Association (FIFA) governing body, Allemane is the only French player to wear the armband in all of his national team appearances. Aside from Canelle and Allemane, Gaston Barreau, René Bonnet, Étienne Jourde, and Robert Lemaître are the only other players to ever captain the national team on their debuts. Bonnet's captaincy is notable due in part to the fact that it was his only appearance with the national team. The first player to captain France in a major international competition while playing under FIFA was André François. He led the team at the football tournament in the 1908 Summer Olympics and captained France to the worst loss in national team and competition history, a 17–1 loss to Denmark. One of the first permanent captains of the national team was Jean Ducret. He captained the team 13 times between 1910 and 1914.

"There’s nothing more beautiful than the national team and I appreciated every cap, be it the first, 50th or 100th. But yes, my proudest moment is that victory and that team, because we could overcome any obstacle, hated defeat and always stepped onto the pitch to win. It was a privilege to captain that team."

— Didier Deschamps on captaining the France team that won the 1998 FIFA World Cup.

Alexandre Villaplane captained France in its first FIFA World Cup match in 1930 and went on to captain the team in the entire tournament. Maurice Cottenet was the first goalkeeper to captain the national team. Alex Thépot was the second and bore the armband at the 1934 FIFA World Cup. The team's first captain after World War II was Alfred Aston. Aston captained the team for the first time in its first match following the conclusion of the war, a 3–1 win over Belgium on Christmas Eve 1944, and subsequently led the team out six more times. Following Aston, the captaincy was rotated among striker Jean Baratte and defenders Roger Marche and Robert Jonquet. Marche and Jonquet alternated the armband at the 1954 and 1958 editions of the FIFA World Cup. Following the retirement of Baratte, Marche took primary control of the captaincy and guided the team until his international retirement in 1960. The former Stade de Reims defender held the record of captaining France the most until he was surpassed by Michel Platini in 1986. Platini is the first France captain to lead the team to victory in a major international competition. He accomplished this feat at UEFA Euro 1984. In 2000, Platini was surpassed by Didier Deschamps, who captained France to its first FIFA World Cup title in 1998. Deschamps surpassed Platini during UEFA Euro 2000 in the team's semi-final match against Portugal. France won the match, 2–1. In the final, France defeated Italy, giving Deschamps his second major honour as captain. Deschamps was succeeded by Marcel Desailly, who ranks second in captaining France the most. Desailly captained France to victory at both the 2001 and 2003 editions of the FIFA Confederations Cup.

From 2004 to 2010, when Raymond Domenech managed the national team, the captaincy regularly alternated between Patrick Vieira and Zinedine Zidane. The former player was given the captaincy first, but handed it over to Zidane when he returned to the team in 2005. Zidane subsequently wore the armband at the 2006 FIFA World Cup and became the first French captain and just the fourth player in association football history to be sent off in a World Cup final match. Former teammate and captain Marcel Desailly is one of the other three. Following Zidane's retirement, Vieira was designated captain of the team for its UEFA Euro 2008 campaign, however, injuries hampered his stint as captain and, as a result, defender Lilian Thuram led the team at the competition. The last permanent captain of the team was the national team's all-time leading goalscorer, Thierry Henry. He first captained the team on 6 February 2008 in a friendly against Spain when he was given the armband following the substitution of Vieira. He held onto the captaincy until a month before the 2010 FIFA World Cup following his relegation to a substitute's role. The armband was given to defender Patrice Evra who led the team at the competition. Under manager Laurent Blanc, several players made their debuts as captains of the national team. In August 2010, Philippe Mexès captained the team for the first time. The following month, Florent Malouda made his debut as captain.

In February 2012, Hugo Lloris was made captain of the national team, having previously held the role on a provisional basis. He captained the national team until his retirement in 2023, having led his side to winning the 2018 FIFA World Cup in Russia and finishing as runners-up in the 2022 FIFA World Cup in Qatar, alongside winning the 2020–21 UEFA Nations League and finishing as runners-up in UEFA Euro 2016. He became the most capped player for France with 145 appearances, surpassing the previous record holder Lilian Thuram. Kylian Mbappé was selected as captain in 2023.

== Captains ==
Appearances and matches captained are composed of FIFA World Cup, UEFA European Football Championship, FIFA Confederations Cup, and pre-World Cup Summer Olympics matches and each competition's required qualification matches, as well as numerous international friendly tournaments and matches. Players are initially listed by number of matches captained, followed by number of international caps attained. If the number of matches captained and the number of caps earned are equal, then the player who captained the national team first is listed first. Statistics correct as of 2 October 2026.

Key
§	Still active for the national team (Note: Players who are still active for the national team are players who have not retired from international football and are, subsequently, eligible to be called up.)
†	Captained the team at a major international tournament (Note: Includes FIFA World Cup, UEFA European Football Championship, FIFA Confederations Cup, and pre-World Cup Summer Olympics matches.)
GK	Goalkeeper
DF	Defender
MF	Midfielder
FW	Forward

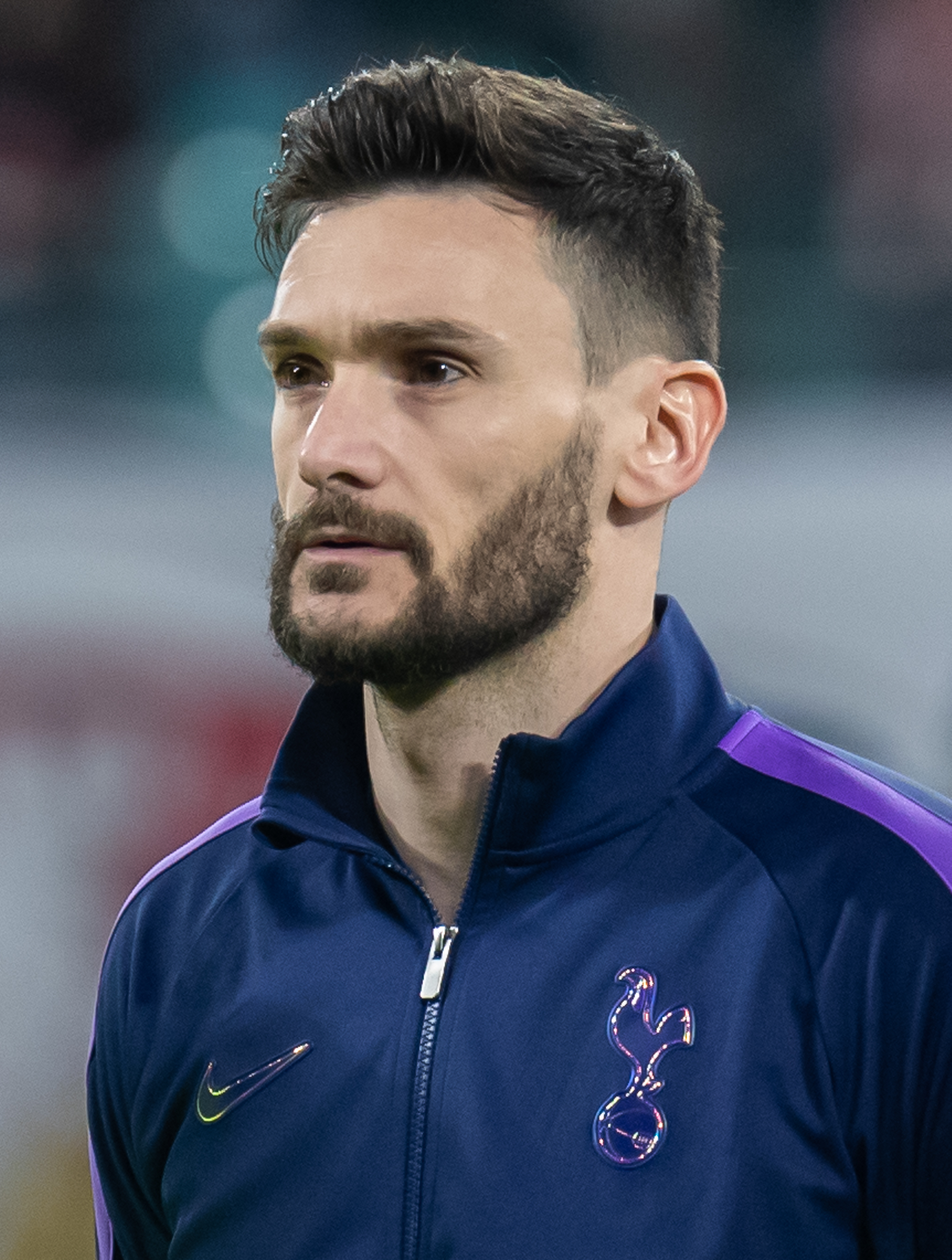
Hugo Lloris holds the record for most captaincies with France and has captained them to victory at the 2018 FIFA World Cup.

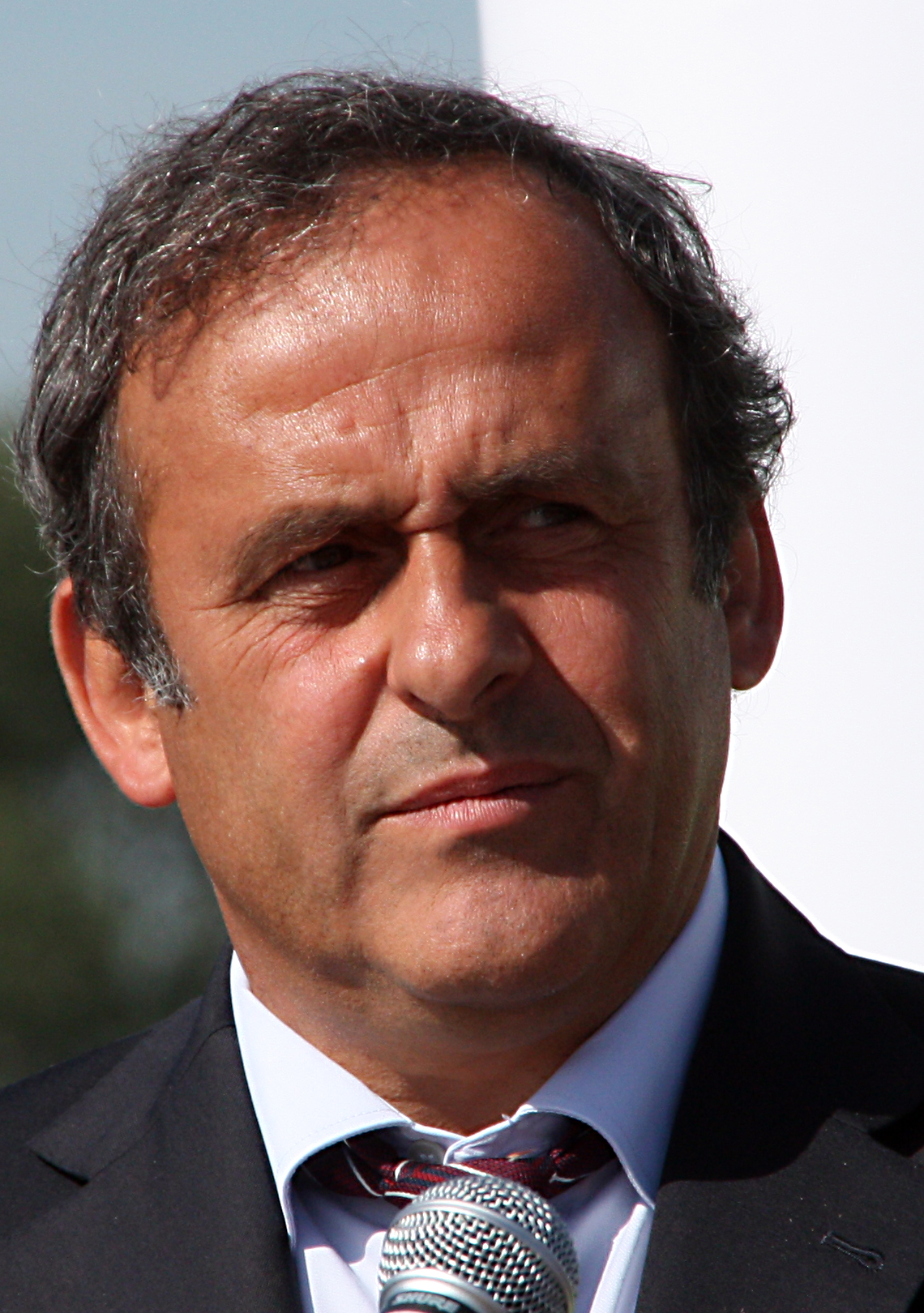
Michel Platini captained France to victory at UEFA Euro 1984.

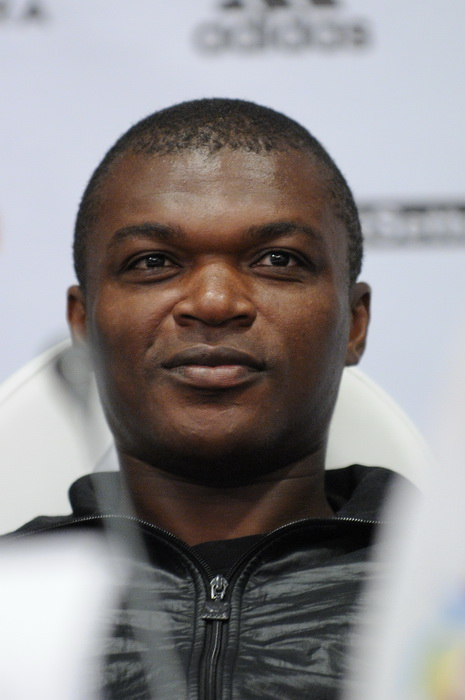
Marcel Desailly captained France national football team to victory at both the 2001 and 2003 editions of the FIFA Confederations Cup.

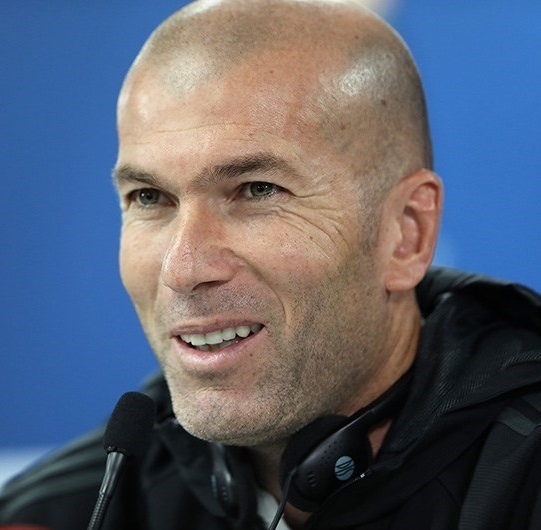
Playmaker Zinedine Zidane captained France to the 2006 FIFA World Cup Final.

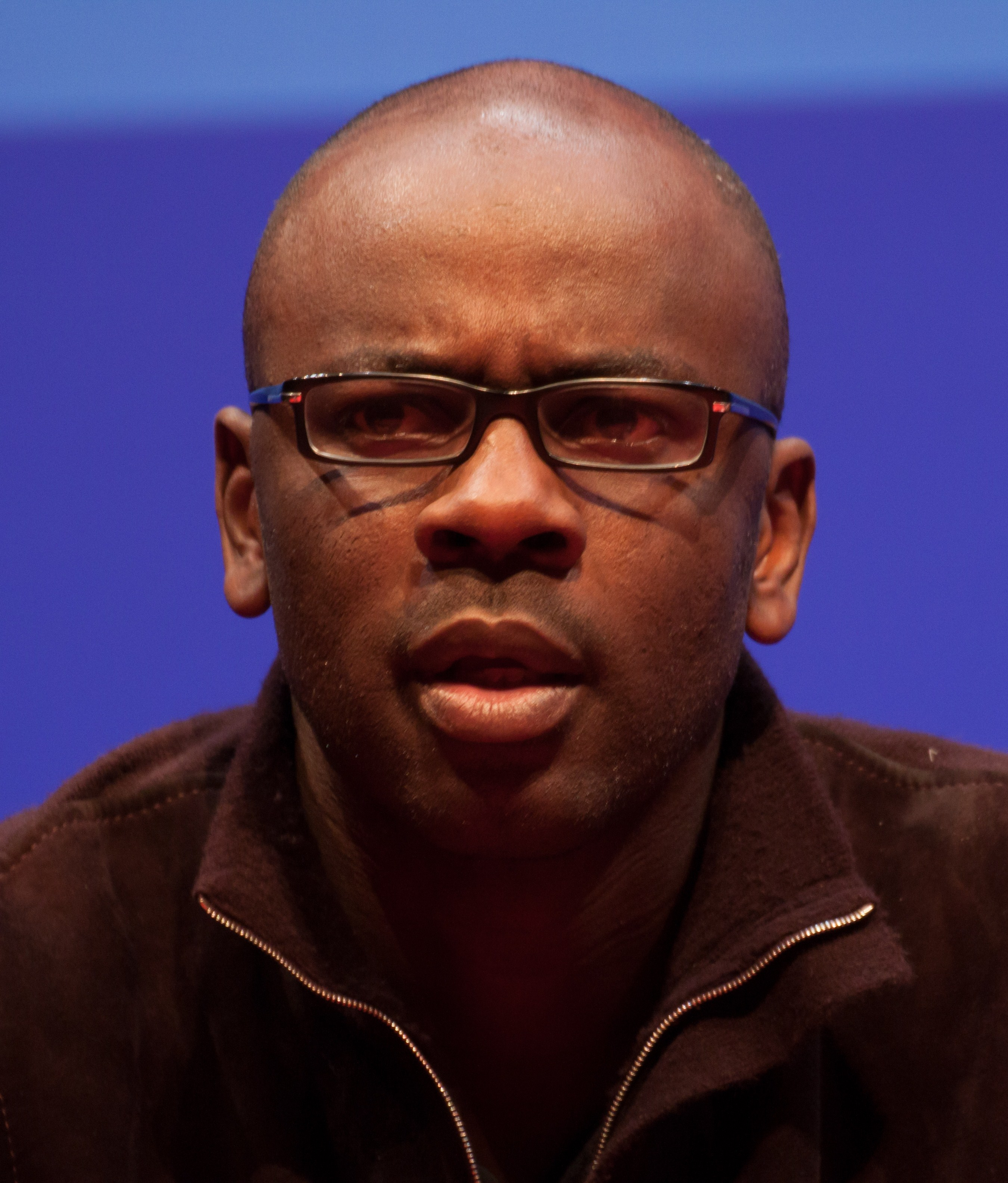
Lilian Thuram captained France at UEFA Euro 2008.

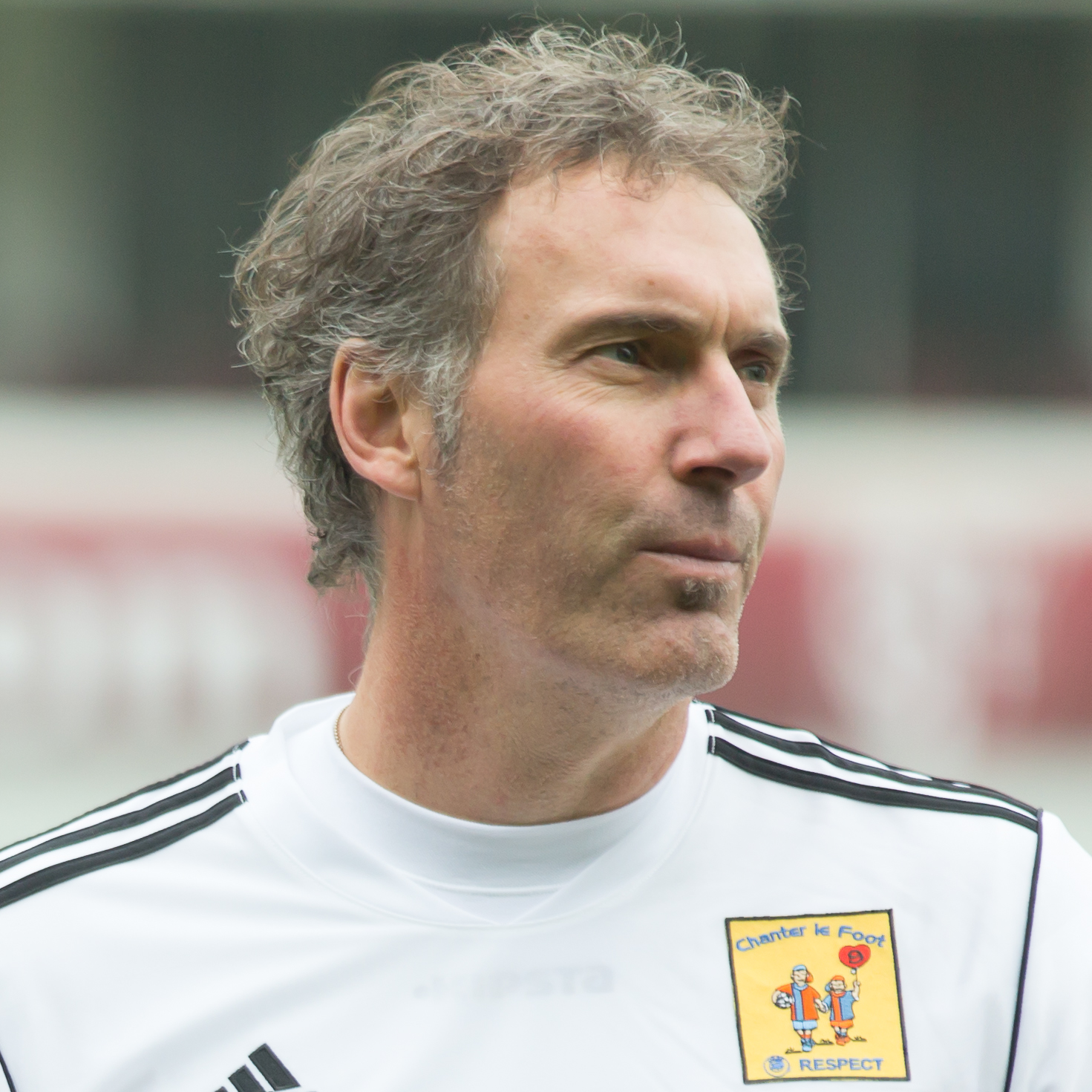
Laurent Blanc has captained France nine times.

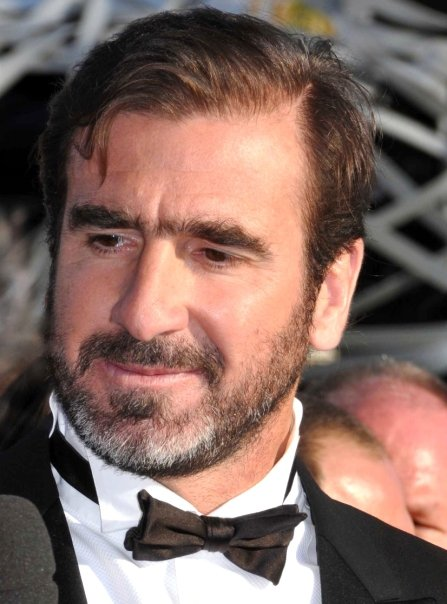
Eric Cantona captained France from 1993 to 1995.

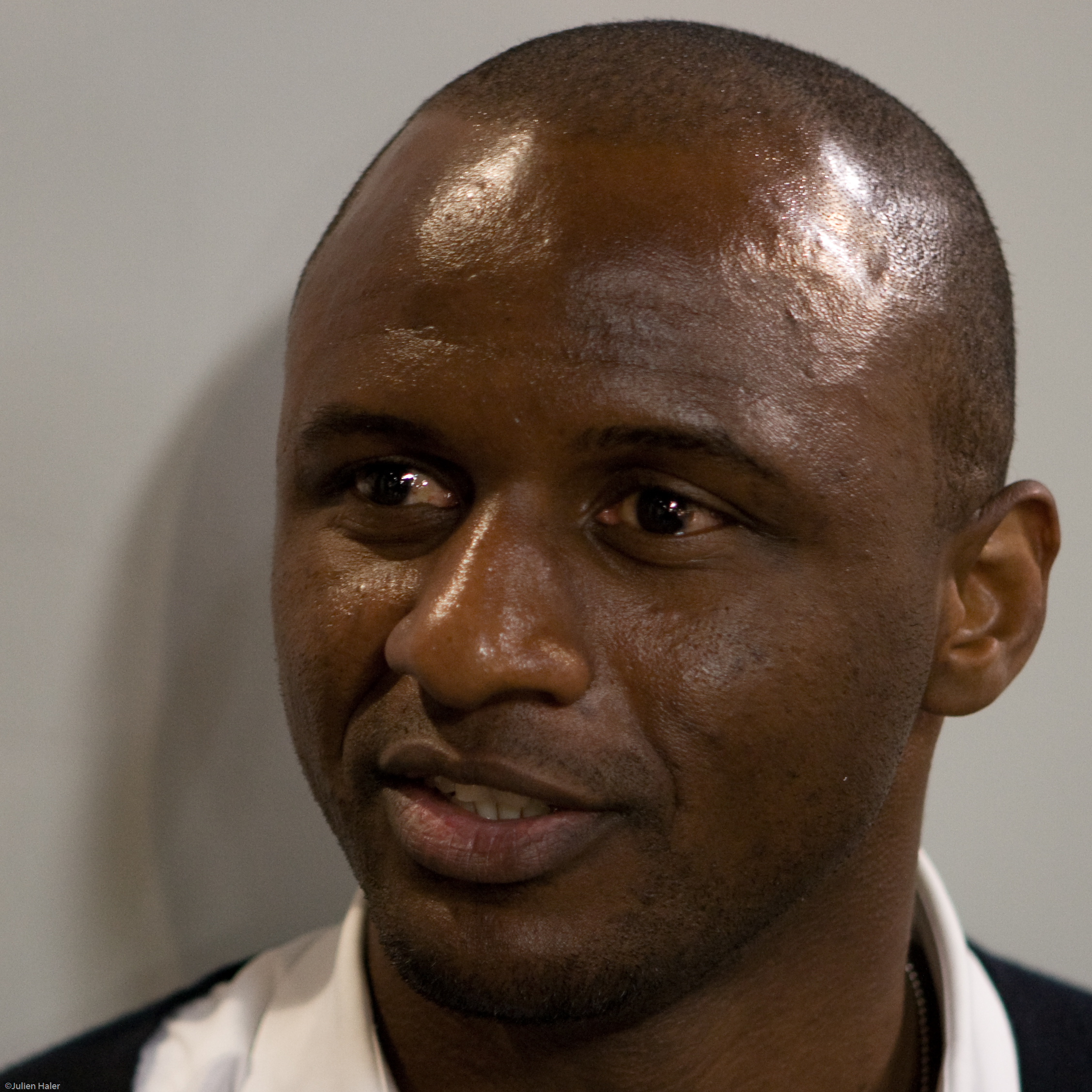
Patrick Vieira captained France infrequently from 2004 until retirement.

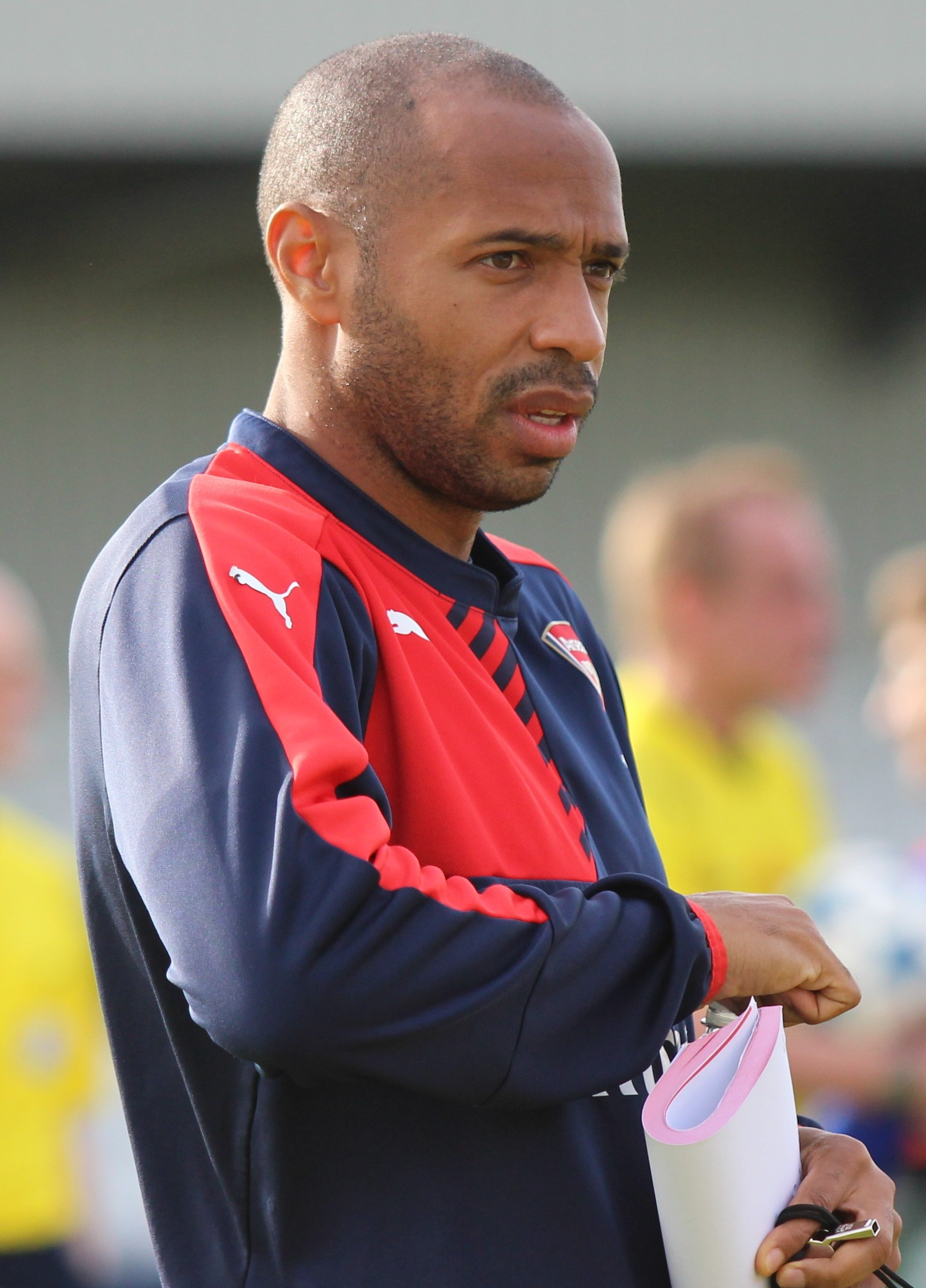
Thierry Henry was the national team's captain from 2008 to 2010.

List of France national team football players who have served as captain of the team
Rank	Player	Position	National team career	Caps as captain	Total caps	First captaincy	Ref
1	Hugo Lloris	GK	2008–2023^{†}	121	145	17 November 2010	
2	Didier Deschamps	MF	1989–2000^{†}	54	103	22 March 1994	
3	Michel Platini	MF	1976–1987^{†}	50	72	5 September 1979	
4	Marcel Desailly	DF	1993–2004^{†}	49	116	6 September 1995	
5	Roger Marche	DF	1947–1959^{†}	42	63	4 June 1950	
6	Kylian Mbappé	FW	2017–^{†}	37	107	24 March 2023	
7	Manuel Amoros	DF	1982–1992^{†}	30	82	18 November 1987	
8	Zinedine Zidane	MF	1994–2006^{†}	26	108	1 September 2001	
9	Marius Trésor	DF	1971–1983^{†}	24	65	9 October 1976	
=	Jean Djorkaeff	DF	1964–1972	24	48	30 April 1969	
11	Thierry Henry	FW	1997–2010^{†}	21	123	6 February 2008	
=	Patrick Vieira	MF	1997–2009^{†}	21	107	4 September 2004	
13	Raphaël Varane	DF	2013–2022^{†}	20	90	14 October 2014	
14	Paul Nicolas	FW	1920–1931^{†}	18	35	19 April 1925	
15	Lilian Thuram	DF	1994–2008^{†}	16	142	9 November 2005	
16	Étienne Mattler	DF	1930–1940^{†}	14	46	21 January 1934	
17	Alex Thépot	GK	1927–1935^{†}	13	31	15 March 1931	
=	Jean Ducret	MF	1910–1914	13	20	6 April 1910	
19	Georges Bereta	FW	1967–1975	12	44	8 September 1973	
=	Edmond Delfour	DF	1929–1938	12	41	10 June 1933	
=	Jean Baratte	FW	1944–1952	12	32	13 November 1949	
22	Jean-Pierre Papin	FW	1986–1995	11	54	26 August 1992	
=	Bernard Bosquier	FW	1964–1972	10	42	27 September 1967	
=	Raymond Dubly	DF	1913–1925^{†}	10	31	15 January 1922	
25	Laurent Blanc	DF	1989–2000^{†}	9	97	26 June 1996	
=	Robert Jonquet	DF	1948–1960^{†}	9	58	16 June 1954	
=	Henri Michel	MF	1967–1980	9	58	3 September 1975	
=	Eric Cantona	FW	1987–1995	9	45	17 November 1993	
=	Alou Diarra	MF	2004–2012^{†}	9	44	22 June 2010	
=	Christian Lopez	DF	1975–1982	9	39	2 February 1977	
=	Franck Sauzée	MF	1988–1993	9	39	28 March 1990	
=	André Lerond	DF	1957–1963	9	31	12 November 1961	
=	Marcel Artelesa	DF	1963–1966^{†}	9	21	9 October 1965	
=	Lucien Gamblin	MF	1911–1923	9	17	5 April 1920	
35	Armand Penverne	MF	1952–1959^{†}	7	39	6 October 1957	
=	Alfred Aston	MF	1934–1946	7	31	24 December 1944	
=	Marcel Langiller	FW	1927–1937	7	30	10 April 1932	
=	Oscar Heisserer	MF	1936–1948	7	25	26 May 1945	
=	Pierre Allemane	DF	1905–1908	7	7	12 February 1905	
40	Maxime Bossis	DF	1976–1986	6	76	23 March 1983	
=	Raymond Kopa	MF	1952–1962	6	45	28 February 1960	
42	Luis Fernández	MF	1982–1992	5	60	9 September 1987	
=	Patrick Battiston	DF	1977–1989^{†}	5	56	31 May 1983	
=	Jean Vincent	FW	1953–1961^{†}	5	46	16 March 1960	
=	Patrice Evra	DF	2004–2016^{†}	5	46	26 May 2010	
=	Alexandre Villaplane	MF	1926–1930^{†}	5	25	23 February 1930	
=	Julien Darui	GK	1939–1951	5	25	26 May 1947	
=	Robert Herbin	DF	1960–1968	5	23	18 April 1965	
=	Henri Bard	DF	1913–1923^{†}	5	18	18 January 1920	
50	Antoine Griezmann	FW	2014–2024^{†}	4	137	25 September 2022	
=	Franck Leboeuf	DF	1995–2002^{†}	4	50	27 February 2001	
=	Jean-Jacques Marcel	MF	1953–1961	4	44	11 December 1960	
=	Jules Dewaquez	FW	1920–1929	4	41	24 April 1927	
=	Pierre Bernard	GK	1960–1965	4	21	25 December 1963	
=	Claude Quittet	DF	1967–1973	4	16	13 October 1972	
=	Louis Mesnier	MF	1904–1913	4	14	23 March 1911	
=	Henri Pavillard	MF	1928–1932	4	14	18 May 1930	
=	Albert Batteux	MF	1948–1949	4	8	27 April 1949	
59	Fabien Barthez	GK	1994–2006	3	87	18 August 2004	
=	N'Golo Kanté	MF	2016–	3	69	9 September 2024	
=	Eric Abidal	DF	2002–2013	3	61	16 November 2007	
=	Bernard Lama	GK	1993–2000	3	44	16 August 1995	
=	François Hugues	DF	1919–1927	3	24	2 April 1923	
=	Jules Vandooren	DF	1933–1942	3	22	13 December 1936	
=	Marcel Domergue	MF	1922–1928	3	20	11 April 1926	
=	Yvon Douis	FW	1957–1965	3	20	29 September 1963	
=	Jean Prouff	MF	1946–1949	3	17	23 April 1949	
=	Jean-Michel Larqué	MF	1969–1976	3	14	24 April 1976	
=	Robert Budzynski	DF	1965–1967	3	11	28 September 1966	
70	Olivier Giroud	FW	2011–2024	2	137	7 October 2020	
=	William Gallas	DF	2002–2011	2	84	19 November 2008	
=	Mike Maignan	GK	2020–	2	51	13 October 2025	
=	Aurélien Tchouaméni	MF	2021–	2	50	10 October 2024	
=	Ibrahima Konaté	DF	2022–	2	30	17 November 2024	
=	Philippe Mexès	DF	2002–2012	2	29	11 August 2010	
=	Presnel Kimpembe	DF	2018–2022	2	28	6 June 2022	
=	René Ferrier	MF	1958–1964	2	24	4 October 1964	
=	Éric Di Meco	DF	1989–1996	2	23	11 October 1995	
=	Maurice Cottenet	GK	1920–1927	2	18	22 March 1925	
=	Gaston Barreau	MF	1911–1914	2	12	30 April 1911	
=	Étienne Jourde	FW	1910–1914	2	8	3 April 1910	
=	Fernand Canelle	DF	1904–1908	2	6	1 May 1904	
=	Daniel Eon	GK	1966–1967	2	3	22 March 1967	
84	Sylvain Wiltord	FW	1999–2006	1	92	31 May 2005	
=	Florent Malouda	MF	2004–2012	1	80	3 September 2010	
=	Robert Pires	MF	1996–2004^{†}	1	79	20 June 2003	
=	Ousmane Dembélé	FW	2016–	1	70	2 October 2026	
=	Jean Tigana	MF	1980–1988	1	52	16 June 1987	
=	Alain Giresse	MF	1974–1986	1	47	28 March 1984	
=	Roger Piantoni	FW	1952–1961	1	37	27 November 1957	
=	Georges Lech	FW	1963–1973	1	35	11 November 1964	
=	Steve Mandanda	GK	2008–2022	1	35	6 June 2011	
=	Samir Nasri	MF	2007–2013	1	35	25 March 2011	
=	Bruno Martini	GK	1987–1996	1	31	27 May 1992	
=	Antoine Cuissard	MF	1946–1954	1	27	30 May 1954	
=	Jean Nicolas	FW	1933–1938	1	25	24 January 1937	
=	Alain Roche	DF	1988–1996	1	25	22 July 1995	
=	Philippe Bonnardel	MF	1920–1927	1	23	16 March 1927	
=	Roger Courtois	FW	1933–1947	1	22	23 March 1947	
=	Jean-Marc Guillou	MF	1974–1978	1	19	19 May 1978	
=	Vincent Guérin	MF	1993–1996	1	19	15 November 1995	
=	Roger Rio	MF	1933–1937	1	18	21 February 1937	
=	Paul Le Guen	MF	1993–1995	1	17	29 March 1995	
=	Joseph Kaucsar	MF	1931–1934	1	15	9 June 1932	
=	Georges Verriest	MF	1933–1936	1	14	9 May 1935	
=	Gabriel Hanot	DF	1908–1919	1	12	9 March 1919	
=	André Chardar	DF	1930–1933	1	12	5 June 1932	
=	Marius Royet	FW	1904–1908	1	9	10 May 1908	
=	Albert Jourda	MF	1914–1924	1	7	4 June 1924	
=	André François	DF	1906–1908	1	6	22 October 1908	
=	Louis Cazal	MF	1927–1930	1	6	11 May 1930	
=	Jacques Mairesse	DF	1927–1934	1	6	12 June 1932	
=	Robert Lemaître	DF	1953–1954	1	2	17 December 1953	
=	René Bonnet	DF	1914	1	1	8 February 1914	

== Timeline ==
Tenure	Incumbent	Others used when incumbent unavailable
1904–1905	Fernand Canelle	
1905–1908	Pierre Allemane	Marius Royet, André François
1910–1914	Jean Ducret	Étienne Jourde, Louis Mesnier, Gaston Barreau
1920–1922	Lucien Gamblin	Henri Bard
1922–1925	Raymond Dubly	François Hugues
1925–1930	Paul Nicolas	Jules Dewaquez, Marcel Domergue
1930	Alexandre Villaplane	
1930–1931	Henri Pavillard	
1931–1933	Alex Thépot	Marcel Langiller
1933–1938	Edmond Delfour	Étienne Mattler, Jules Vandooren
1938–1940	Étienne Mattler	
1944–1946	Alfred Aston	
1946–1948	Oscar Heisserer	Julien Darui
1949–1952	Jean Baratte	Roger Marche
1952–1959	Roger Marche	Robert Jonquet, Armand Penverne, Raymond Kopa
1960–1961	Jean-Jacques Marcel	
1961–1963	André Lerond	
1965–1966	Marcel Artelesa	
1967–1969	Bernard Bosquier	
1969–1972	Jean Djorkaeff	
1972–1973	Claude Quittet	
1973–1975	Georges Bereta	
1975–1976	Henri Michel	
1976–1979	Marius Trésor	Christian Lopez
1979–1987	Michel Platini	Marius Trésor, Maxime Bossis, Patrick Battiston
1987–1988	Luis Fernández	Manuel Amoros
1988–1992	Manuel Amoros	Luis Fernández, Franck Sauzée
1992–1993	Jean-Pierre Papin	
1993–1995	Eric Cantona	
1995–2000	Didier Deschamps	Marcel Desailly, Laurent Blanc
2000–2004	Marcel Desailly	Zinedine Zidane
2004–2005	Patrick Vieira	Fabien Barthez, Sylvain Wiltord
2005–2006	Zinedine Zidane	Patrick Vieira, Lilian Thuram
2006–2008	Patrick Vieira	Lilian Thuram
2008	Lilian Thuram	Thierry Henry
2008–2010	Thierry Henry	Patrick Vieira, Eric Abidal, William Gallas
2010	Patrice Evra	Alou Diarra
2010–2012	Rotation	Alou Diarra, Hugo Lloris, Eric Abidal, Philippe Mexès, Florent Malouda, Samir Nasri, Steve Mandanda
2012–2022	Hugo Lloris	Blaise Matuidi, Raphaël Varane, Philippe Mexès, Mamadou Sakho, Olivier Giroud, Presnel Kimpembe, Antoine Griezmann
2023–present	Kylian Mbappé	Antoine Griezmann, Olivier Giroud, N'Golo Kanté, Aurélien Tchouaméni, Ibrahima Konaté, Mike Maignan, Ousmane Dembélé

== See also ==
- List of France international footballers
- List of leading goalscorers for the France national football team
