= René Bonnet =

René Bonnet may refer to:

- René Bonnet (footballer) (1880–), French footballer
- René Bonnet (businessman) (1904–1983), French businessman
  - Automobiles René Bonnet, French automobile manufacturer founded by the above
- René Bonnet (1905–1998), better known as Herboné, French comic book artist and scriptwriter
