= Quittet =

Quittet (French pronunciation: [ki'te]) is a surname. Notable people with the surname include:

- Alain Quittet (born 1956), French sports shooter and Paralympic road cyclist
- Catherine Quittet (born 1964), French skier
- Claude Quittet (born 1941), French footballer
