= Patrice Evra =

French footballer (born 1981)

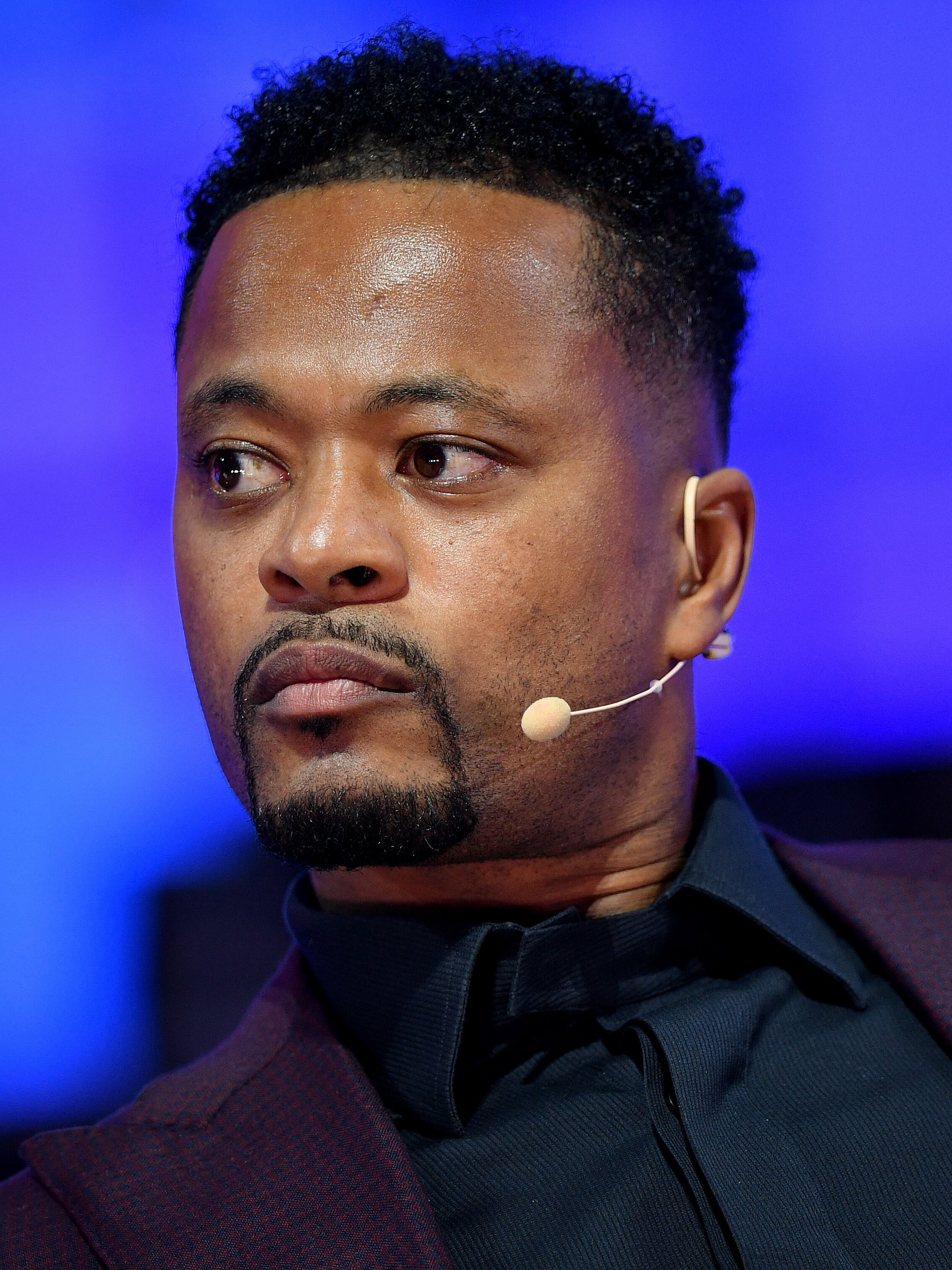
- Evra in 2022

Personal information
- Full name: Patrice Latyr Evra
- Date of birth: 15 May 1981 (age 45)
- Place of birth: Dakar, Senegal
- Height: 1.74 m (5 ft 9 in)
- Position: Left-back

Youth career
- 1992–1993: CO Les Ulis
- 1993–1997: CSF Brétigny

Senior career*
Years	Team	Apps	(Gls)
1998–1999	Marsala	24	(3)
1999–2000	Monza	3	(0)
2000–2002	Nice	40	(1)
2002–2006	Monaco	120	(2)
2006–2014	Manchester United	273	(7)
2014–2017	Juventus	53	(3)
2017	Marseille	15	(1)
2018	West Ham United	5	(0)
Total		533	(17)

International career
2002–2003	France U21	11	(0)
2004–2016	France	81	(0)
Medal record
Men's football
Representing France
UEFA European Championship
Runner-up	2016 France
- * Club domestic league appearances and goals

Patrice Latyr Evra (French pronunciation: [patʁis ɛvʁa]; born 15 May 1981) is a French former professional footballer who played as a left-back. Evra served as captain for both Manchester United and the France national team. He was named in the PFA Team of the Year on three occasions, as well as the FIFPro World XI and the UEFA Team of the Year. He is often regarded as one of the greatest full-backs of all time.

The son of a diplomat, Evra was born in Senegal and arrived in Europe when he was a year old. Evra started his senior career with Italian club Marsala. The following season, he joined Monza, but returned to France a year later to play for Nice where he was converted into a full-back. In 2002, he joined Monaco and was part of the team that reached the 2004 UEFA Champions League Final. Evra's performances for Monaco culminated in a move to English club Manchester United in January 2006, where he spent eight years and went on to win 14 trophies including five Premier League titles and a UEFA Champions League. In 2014 he joined Italian side Juventus, where he won two Serie A titles and played in another Champions League final. Evra moved to Marseille in January 2017; however, he was released in November 2017 after being banned from UEFA competition for seven months for kicking a fan prior to a UEFA Europa League match. Following a short-term contract with West Ham United in February 2018, Evra retired from professional football in July 2019, later completing his professional coaching badges and returning to former club Manchester United as a trainee coach at the club's academy.

Evra participated in five major international tournaments for France: the 2008, 2012 and 2016 UEFA European Championships, and both the 2010 and 2014 editions of the FIFA World Cup. Ahead of the 2010 World Cup, Evra was named captain of the national team by manager Raymond Domenech. At the tournament, he appeared in two group matches, although France had a poor campaign that saw the players go on strike after a first-round elimination. The incident resulted in Evra, for his role as captain, being suspended from national team duty for five matches. He returned to the squad and enjoyed a successful 2014 World Cup in Brazil under Didier Deschamps as France reached the quarter-finals.

== Club career ==
=== Early career ===
Evra began his football career playing for hometown club CO Les Ulis. After playing in the streets for years, he was brought to the club by friend Tshymen Buhanga, who informed the club coach, "I bring you the new Romário." Evra spent one year at the club under the watch of coach Jean-Claude Giordanella, who later became vice-president of the club. Giordanella described the player as "more quiet, almost shy. He was a good kid". Evra originally played football in the striker position and, while training at Les Ulis, underwent trials with professional clubs Rennes and Lens. Following the conclusion of the evaluations, Evra was rejected primarily due to his size. In 1993, he joined amateur club CSF Brétigny based in nearby Brétigny-sur-Orge. Similar to his stint with Les Ulis, Evra went on trials with several clubs, most notably Toulouse and Paris Saint-Germain. He was ultimately signed by the latter and converted into a winger. Evra trained at the Camp des Loges for a few months, but was later released.

After failing to convince PSG officials of his ability as a footballer, Evra returned to Brétigny and was invited by a friend to participate in an indoor five-a-side football tournament organised by the Juvisy-sur-Orge sports center. While playing, he was spotted by an Italian scout who offered him the opportunity to attend a trial with professional club Torino. Evra spent ten days training with the club and, after the trial, was offered a place on the club's youth team. Afterwards, he was approached by Serie C1 club Marsala, whose officials enticed him with the prospect of becoming a professional. Evra chose the latter option and signed his first professional contract at age 17. Evra spent only one season with the club, appearing in 27 total matches and scoring six goals. After this, he moved to the Serie B level to join Monza for a €250,000 transfer fee after potential moves to Serie A clubs Roma and Lazio fell-through. Evra only appeared in three matches, making his debut on 29 August 1999 in a 2–1 away defeat against Alzano. He left the club following one season after becoming frustrated with his lack of appearances.

=== Nice ===
Evra returned to France joining professional club Nice in Ligue 2, the second division of French football. He spent the majority of his first season with the club playing with its reserve team in the Championnat de France amateur, the fourth level of French football. He primarily played as a midfielder on the team and appeared in 18 matches, scoring one goal. Midway through the campaign, he was called into the first team by manager Sandro Salvioni. He was assigned the number 26 shirt and made his club debut on 7 October 2000 in the team's 7–2 defeat to Châteauroux, starting in the left winger position. Evra made four more appearances during the campaign, appearing as a substitute in defeats to Cannes, Nancy and starting in the team's 3–0 win over Laval and 1–0 loss to Le Havre in the final match of the season. Evra played primarily as centre forward in the matches.

In the 2001–02 season, Evra switched to the number 17 shirt and was promoted to the first team on a permanent basis. In the team's first league match of the season against Laval, he started in the team's 2–1 win. Towards the end of the match, reserve left-back Jean-Charles Cirilli, who was starting in place of the regular starter José Cobos, suffered an injury, which required the player to be substituted. As a consequence, Evra dropped back into the role and played out the rest of the match in the position. Following the match, due to injuries to both Cobos and Cirilli, Evra was informed by Salvioni he would take over the position. Evra made his debut in the position in the team's following league match against Strasbourg, a 3–0 defeat. He appeared regularly in the campaign and, following the return of Cobos, was even allowed to play in his preferred left wing role. (Note: Nice matches in which both starting left-back José Cobos and Evra appear in the starting line-up are tallied in the attached sources.) With the club in the midst of a promotion battle, Evra scored his first and only goal for Nice in his last match with the club, a 4–3 win over Laval. The victory placed Nice in third place, which resulted in the club earning promotion to Ligue 1 for the first time since 1997. For his performances, Evra was named to the National Union of Professional Footballers (UNFP) Ligue 2 Team of the Year in the left-back position.

=== Monaco ===
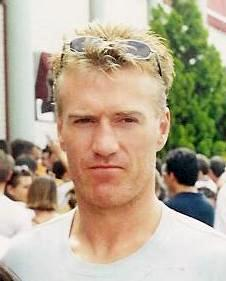
Didier Deschamps coached Evra during his four-year stint with Monaco.

Following the season, Evra was recruited by Nice's Derby de la Côte d'Azur rivals Monaco. Despite wanting to play as a left winger again, Evra was advised by manager Didier Deschamps he would only play as a left-back; Evra has since credited Deschamps for allowing him to become a better defender after initially describing the role as being "not fun". Evra was inserted into a back four that consisted of centre-backs Rafael Márquez and Sébastien Squillaci and right-back Franck Jurietti. Evra was assigned the number 3 shirt and made his debut for the club in the opening match of the 2002–03 season against Troyes. He played the entire match in a 4–0 win. On 28 September, Evra scored his first goal for the club, scoring the match-winner in a 2–1 victory against Rennes. On 22 March 2003, he scored his second goal of the season in a 3–0 away win over Le Havre. The victory allowed Monaco to maintain its position at the top of the table, as the club was in a three-way battle with Lyon and Marseille. Monaco climactically conceded first place to Lyon in May, which resulted in Lyon being declared champions for the second time in its history. Monaco finished the campaign in second place, which merited the club an appearance in the UEFA Champions League. The club was also rewarded domestically for its performance in the Coupe de la Ligue where it reached the final. Evra featured in the team's 4–1 win over Sochaux in the match. The league cup title gave Evra the first major honour of his career.

After the season, Márquez and Jurietti departed Monaco for Spanish club Barcelona and Bordeaux respectively, and were replaced by Gaël Givet and Hugo Ibarra, the latter joining the club on loan. In the 2003–04 league season, Deschamps installed Evra as a vice-captain and he responded by appearing in 33 matches and providing four assists. Monaco spent six months from September to March in first place, but, like the previous season, conceded the top spot to Lyon as the season wore on. Evra made his UEFA Champions League debut on 17 September 2003 in the team's opening group stage match against PSV. Evra played the entire match in a 2–1 win. He appeared in all six group stage matches as Monaco finished in first place. (Note: The six UEFA Champions League group stage matches Evra appeared in are tallied in the attached sources.) For his performances in the first half of the 2003–04 season, Evra was linked with a 2004 winter move to English club Arsenal, Italian clubs Juventus and Milan, and Spanish club Barcelona.

After appearing consistently with the team, on 24 March 2004, Evra suffered an ankle injury in the club's 4–2 first leg defeat to Spanish club Real Madrid in the quarter-finals of the Champions League. Evra subsequently missed two weeks in the league, but was healthy enough to return for the team's second leg quarter-final tie against Madrid, which Monaco won 3–1. (Note: Monaco league matches Evra missed due to the injury suffered in the Real Madrid quarter-final first leg, which equated to two weeks, are tallied in the attached sources.) The win allowed the club advancement to the Champions League semi-finals on the away goals rule. In the semi-finals, Monaco faced English club Chelsea. Evra appeared in both matches as Monaco advanced to the final, beating the London club 5–3 on aggregate. In the 2004 UEFA Champions League Final, Monaco were pitted against Porto at the Arena AufSchalke in Gelsenkirchen, Germany. The club was defeated 3–0 by Porto. Evra played the full 90 minutes. After the season, Evra was given the UNFP Young Player of the Year award, becoming only the second defender and the first since 1997 (Philippe Christanval) to win the award. He was also named to the organisation's Ligue 1 Team of the Year.

Despite missing out on playing in UEFA Euro 2004, Evra endured a tumultuous summer in which the player was linked with moves to Manchester United in England, and Juventus and Internazionale in Italy. Despite offers, Evra remained at Monaco. On 24 September 2004, he signed a one-year contract extension with the club until 2008. In the season, Evra was a regular appearing in a career-high 52 matches scoring one goal and contributing seven assists as Monaco reached the semi-finals in both the Coupe de la Ligue and Coupe de France. Evra scored his only goal of the season on 8 January 2005 in the team's round of 64 Coupe de France match against amateur club AC Seyssinet-Pariset. He netted the opener in a 7–0 win. In the Champions League, Monaco reached the first knockout round, where they suffered defeat to PSV 3–0 on aggregate. Evra appeared in nine of the ten matches the team contested in the competition. In April 2005, Evra confirmed he was interested in departing the club, stating, "I will have a decision to make for the rest of my career... If attracted clubs show concrete interest, I will think about it seriously." Despite several clubs declaring interest in Evra, Deschamps declared he would not be sold. At the start of the 2005–06 season, Monaco struggled falling to 15th place after only a month of play. On 21 December 2005, Evra made his final appearance with the club in a 1–0 win over Lille in the Coupe de la Ligue.

=== Manchester United ===
==== 2006–2008 ====
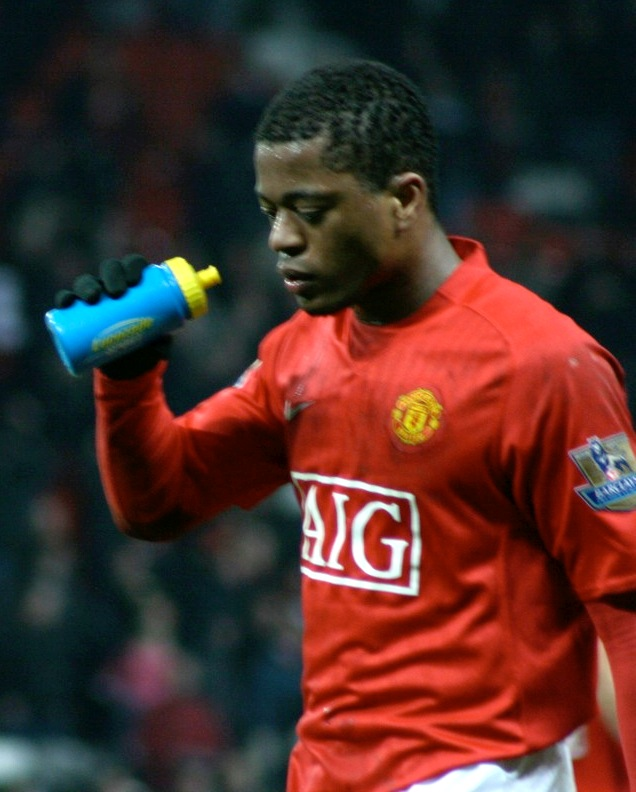
Evra comes off the pitch after a match versus Arsenal

On 27 December, French sources revealed that Manchester United was interested in signing Evra. Despite rumours of Monaco reaching a transfer agreement with Internazionale, on 3 January 2006, Evra revealed he preferred to move to England to join Manchester United. The following day, Manchester United officially issued a transfer bid for the player. On 6 January, United manager Alex Ferguson confirmed a deal for Evra was reached. Four days later, the transfer was official as Evra joined the club for a transfer fee of around £5.5 million and signed a three-and-a-half-year contract. Evra's arrival signalled Ferguson's intention to shore up the club's defence that had suffered since the sidelining of Gabriel Heinze. After joining the club, Evra affirmed that Manchester was his only future destination: "I was not very keen to go forward in the talks with Arsenal, Liverpool or Real Madrid. They all talked with my agent in the past two seasons. But to me, it was over. As I said to the Monaco officials, I only wanted to hear about Manchester."

Evra initially had some problems adapting to the English game. He made his debut for the club on 14 January in a 3–1 away defeat to Manchester City in the Premier League, and he was substituted at half-time after failing to make an impact. After the conclusion of the match, Ferguson stated, "Maybe it was a bit of a gamble playing Evra," while the player himself admitted that "playing for Manchester United was something I was not prepared for". Despite the initial set-back, Evra started in the team's ensuing match against Liverpool, a 1–0 victory, and was praised for his performance by teammate Rio Ferdinand. On 26 February, Evra appeared as a substitute in United's 4–0 win over Wigan Athletic in the 2006 League Cup final. On 2 March, it was reported that Liverpool defender Steve Finnan had racially abused Evra in the match. The abuse claims surfaced from two deaf television viewers lodging a police complaint. The viewers claimed to have lip-read Finnan abusing Evra during the televised match. Finnan denied the charge and, after an investigation, The Football Association (FA) decided against charging the player. Evra regularly alternated between the bench and the starting 11 to close out the campaign. He finished the season with 14 total appearances for his new club.

In Evra's first full season as a Manchester United player, he struggled to consistently appear as a starter early on in the season as Ferguson preferred Evra's compatriot Mikaël Silvestre. After appearing as an unused substitute in United's first two Champions League matches, on 17 October 2006, Evra made his European debut for the club in its 3–0 group stage win over Copenhagen. On 18 November, he provided the assist for the game-winning goal, scored by Wayne Rooney, in the team's 2–1 win over Sheffield United. Eight days later, Evra scored his first goal for the club in a 3–0 league win over Everton, also contributing an assist. By December, Evra began featuring as a regular in the starting 11. After starting in United's 3–1 Champions League win over Benfica on 6 December, Evra started nine consecutive matches. Evra provided assists in two of the matches; a Rooney goal in a 2–1 away defeat to Arsenal and another in a 2–0 victory over Charlton Athletic. On 10 April 2007, Evra scored the final goal in a 7–1 win over Roma in the second leg of the quarter-finals of the 2006–07 UEFA Champions League. The goal was his first-ever in the Champions League and helped progress Manchester United to the semi-finals, where the club suffered defeat to the eventual champions Milan. Following the league season, which Manchester United won by a six-point margin, Evra was named to the Professional Footballers' Association (PFA) Team of the Year, despite only appearing in 24 league matches.

Evra began the 2007–08 season as the first-choice left-back. He began the campaign appearing in United's 3–0 penalty shoot-out win over rivals Chelsea in the 2007 FA Community Shield. In competitive matches, Evra appeared in the club's first 12 matches. He missed his first match of the season against Ukrainian club Dynamo Kyiv in the Champions League after suffering a calf injury during warm-ups. Evra returned to the team a few days later for the team's league match against Arsenal. The rest paid off as he assisted Cristiano Ronaldo's goal in the 82nd minute to give United a 2–1 lead. France teammate William Gallas later equalised for Arsenal to draw the match at 2–2. In the return match against Dynamo Kyiv in the Champions League, Evra provided the assist for one of the goals in a 4–0 victory. Though he made 48 appearances in all competitions, Evra failed to score a goal. Manchester United clinched its second consecutive Premier League title on the final day, edging Chelsea by two points. The club later completed a double after defeating the same club on penalties in the 2008 UEFA Champions League Final. Evra made ten appearances in the competition, which included playing the entire 120 minutes in the final. After the season, on 12 June, he signed a four-year contract extension with Manchester United, a deal that was set to keep him at Old Trafford until 2012.

==== 2008–2014 ====
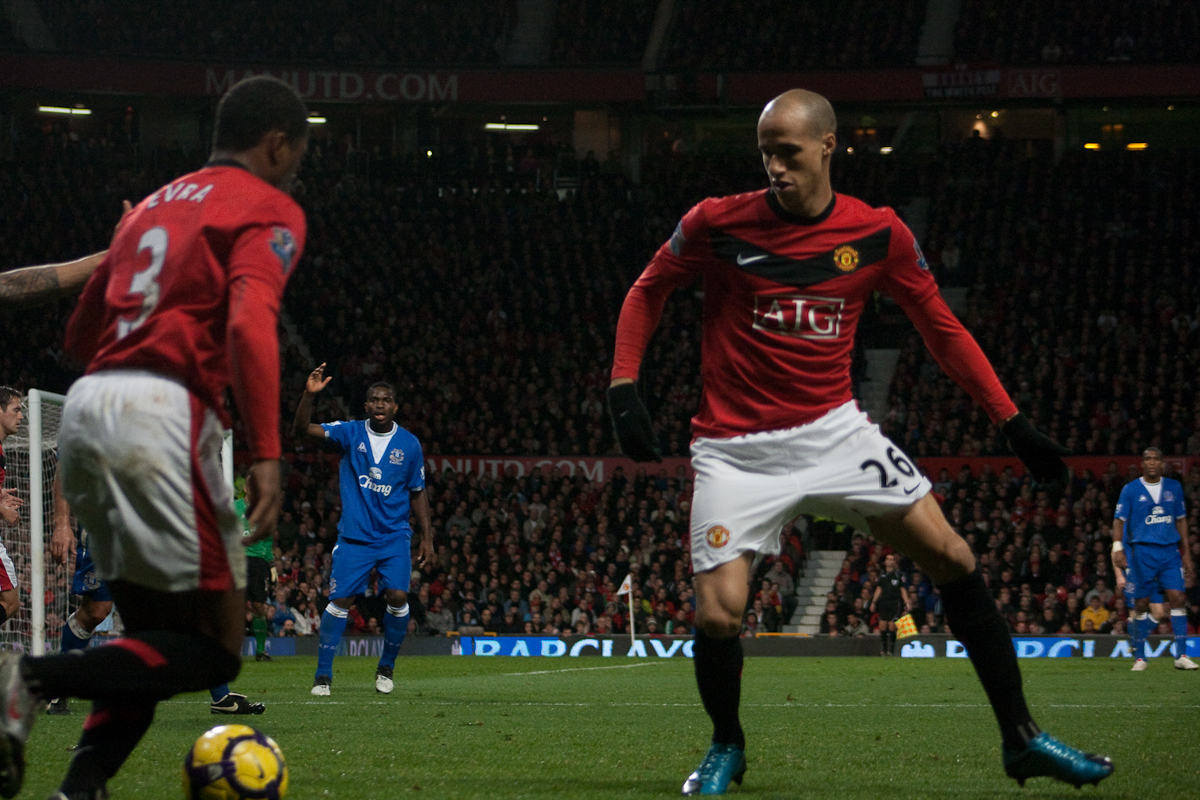
Evra (left) passing the ball to Gabriel Obertan in a match against Everton in the 2009–10 season

Prior to the start of the 2008–09 season, on 18 July 2008, Evra was charged with four separate counts of improper conduct by the FA. The charges were related to an incident that occurred during the 2007–08 season when Evra had an altercation with a Chelsea groundsman during a warm-down following a match on 26 April. The defender denied the charges and was supported by several members of the club's staff, who commented that the player was racially abused by the groundsman prior to the confrontation. Evra remained free to play for United up to the date of the hearing despite the charges being made in July 2008. He began the campaign in similar fashion to the previous season as Manchester United won the Community Shield following the team's 3–0 victory over Portsmouth on penalties. Evra was ever-present in Manchester United's first 22 competitive matches of the season, starting 19 of them. At the hearing on 5 December, Evra was found guilty of improper conduct, and handed a four-match ban – due to start on 22 December 2008 – and a £15,000 fine.

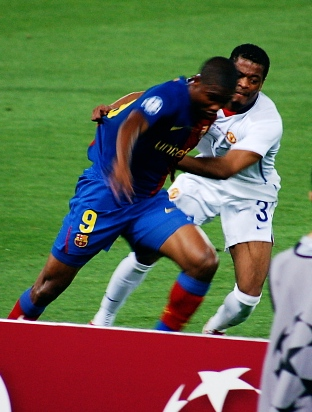
Evra (right) defending against Samuel Eto'o in the 2009 UEFA Champions League Final

Despite the suspension, Evra still featured with Manchester United in December as the club participated in the 2008 FIFA Club World Cup. He appeared in both matches the team contested as United came out as champions after defeating Ecuadorian club LDU Quito in the final. Evra temporarily returned to the team domestically for its home match against Chelsea on 11 January 2009, assisting the second goal in a 3–0 victory. He was later forced to leave the match due to a foot injury, which was later discovered to be serious. Evra missed a month and returned to the line-up on 15 February in a 3–0 win over Fulham. Evra subsequently appeared in every remaining competitive match for United, excluding an April league match against Sunderland, as the club cruised to its third consecutive Premier League title, won the League Cup, and reached the 2009 UEFA Champions League Final after defeating league rivals Arsenal 4–1 on aggregate in the semi-finals. Following the second leg against Arsenal, Evra was asked his opinion of the team's 3–1 second leg victory, and declared, "It was 11 men against 11 babies. We never doubted ourselves." The final marked Evra's third appearance in Champions League finals as Manchester United lost 2–0 to Barcelona. At the end of the season, Evra was included in the PFA Team of the Year for the second time.

For the first time in his career, Evra appeared in all 38 league matches in the 2009–10 season. The campaign initially began badly for him after he delivered a soft penalty shot, described by some in the media as "awful", in the team's penalty shoot-out defeat to Chelsea in the 2009 FA Community Shield. Due to injuries to Rio Ferdinand, Gary Neville and Ryan Giggs, he captained the team in several matches during the season wearing the armband for the first time in his Manchester United career in the team's 3–1 Champions League victory over VfL Wolfsburg. In December 2009, Evra was among three Manchester United players named to the FIFPro World XI for the 2009 calendar year, before being named to the UEFA Team of the Year in January 2010. On 28 February 2010, Evra captained Manchester United to a 2–1 win against Aston Villa in the 2010 League Cup final. The league cup title was Evra's fourth overall as well as his first title earned as a captain. He also became only the second Frenchman after Eric Cantona to captain a Manchester United team to victory in a major competition. In league play, Manchester United failed to win its fourth-straight league title, conceding the honour to Chelsea. The club also failed to reach the Champions League final for their third-straight final appearance, losing to German champions Bayern Munich in the quarter-finals.

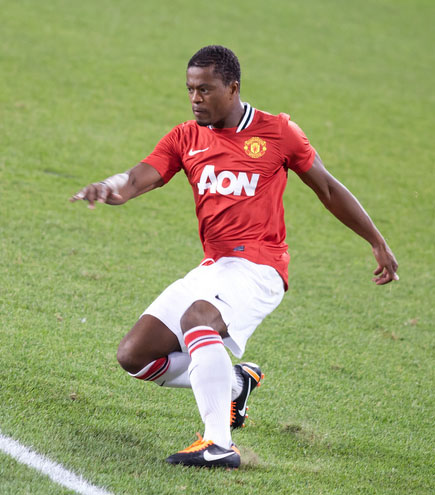
Evra playing in the 2011 MLS All-Star Game

Early on during the 2010–11 season, Evra was hampered by constant inquiries about what happened at the 2010 FIFA World Cup from the French Football Federation (FFF), the French media, as well as the French government. Evra's contract with Manchester United was also up at the end of the 2011–12 season, which led to the player being linked with a move to Real Madrid. Evra's hearing with the FFF in Paris, which he attended, was held the day after the team's opening 3–0 league win over Newcastle United. Evra played over 85 minutes in the match. On 20 November, Evra scored his second Premier League goal in a 2–0 win at home against Wigan Athletic. On 21 February 2011, after weeks of negotiations, Evra signed a contract extension with Manchester United that would keep him with the club until at least the end of the 2013–14 season. Two days after signing his contract extension, Evra participated in United's 0–0 draw with Marseille in the first leg of the team's first knockout round tie in the Champions League. The match, played at the Stade Vélodrome in Marseille, was Evra's first match played in France since the 2010 World Cup debacle. As a consequence, he was subjected to a barrage of jeers and boos every time he touched the ball.

At the start of the 2011–12 season, Evra helped United win the 2011 Community Shield against Manchester City on 7 August. Despite being caught out in the first half by a header from Joleon Lescott and a long-range Edin Džeko strike that put City into a 2–0 lead, United rallied in the second half and won 3–2 to claim the Shield. On 15 October, Evra captained Manchester United in the club's 1–1 draw away to Liverpool. Following the match, in an interview with French television channel Canal+, Evra asserted that Liverpool player Luis Suárez had racially abused him multiple times during the match. He also stated that he had informed referee Andre Marriner of the incidents at the conclusion of the match. The following day, the FA announced it would investigate the claim, and on 17 November, the FA announced it would charge Suárez with "abusive and/or insulting words and/or behaviour contrary to FA rules", including "a reference to the ethnic origin and/or colour and/or race of Patrice Evra".

During the 2012–13 season, despite being just 174 cm (5 ft 9 in) tall, Evra built up a reputation as an attacking threat at corners, doubling his goals tally from his previous seven years at the club with three headed goals from corners in the space of 13 games, against Newcastle United, Arsenal and Swansea City. He continued this run into the 2013–14 season, heading home against Cardiff City on 24 November 2013. In addition to the headers, Evra has also scored twice from open play since the start of the 2012–13 season, the first a low drive from just outside the penalty area against Newcastle on Boxing Day 2012, and the second a curling, right-footed effort against Stoke City in the fifth round of the League Cup almost a year later. On 23 May 2014, Evra signed a new one-year contract extension that would have kept him at Manchester United until at least the summer of 2015.

=== Juventus ===
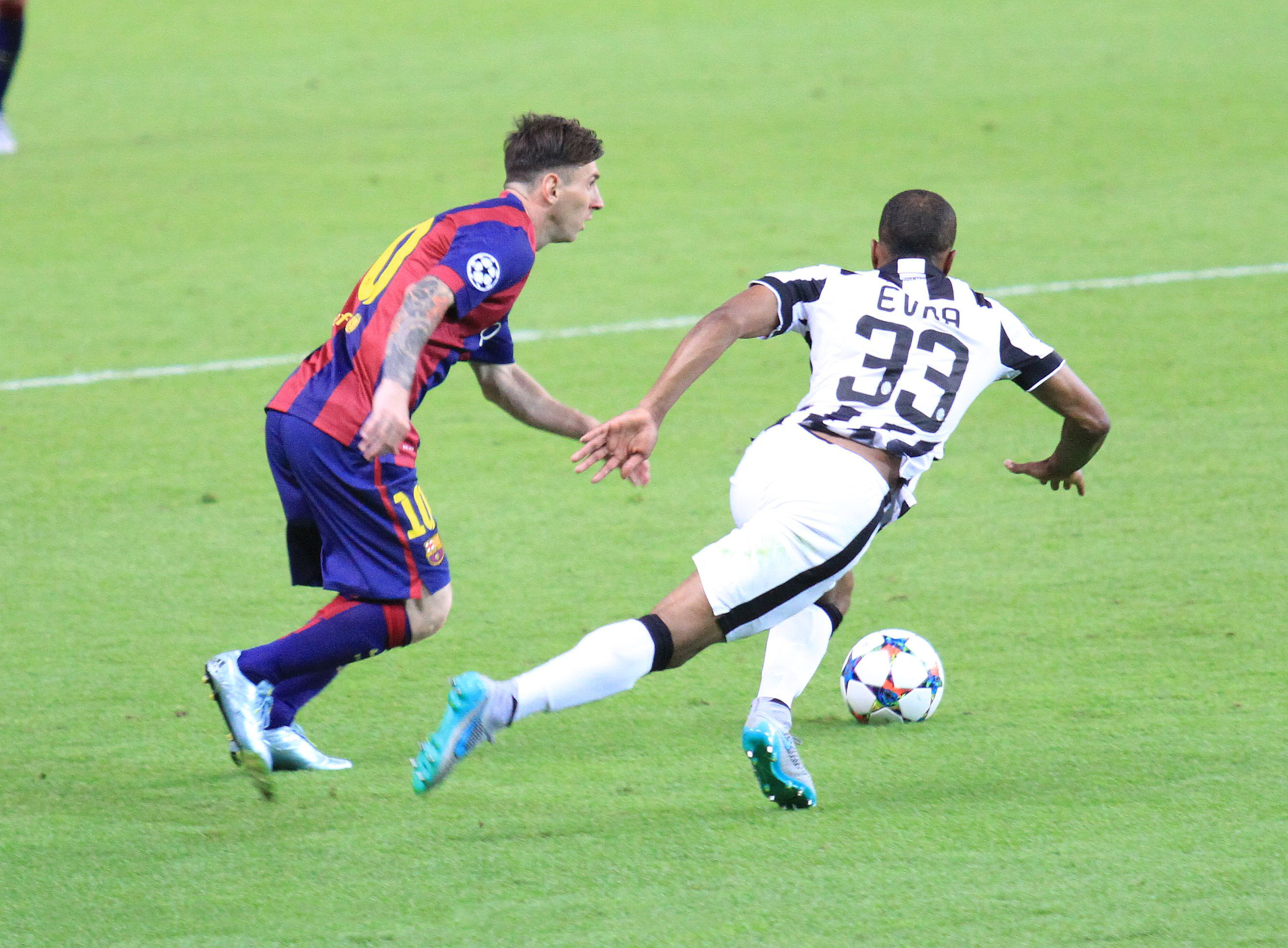
Evra battles Barcelona forward Lionel Messi for the ball during the Champions League final in June 2015.

On 21 July 2014, Evra joined Italian Serie A club Juventus on a two-year contract. The fee was £1.2 million, which rose to £1.5 million, after Juventus qualified for the 2015–16 UEFA Champions League. On 14 December 2014, he scored his first goal for the club, opening the scoring of a 1–1 home draw to Sampdoria. On 6 June 2015, Evra started for Juventus in the 2015 UEFA Champions League final as Juventus were defeated 3–1 by Barcelona at Berlin's Olympiastadion. The match was the fifth Champions League final in which he had appeared, and the defeat meant he became the first and only player to lose four Champions League finals. In addition, he becomes the first and only player to lose the final with three different clubs, and the first and only player to lose against the same opponent, Barcelona, on three occasions.

Evra made his 100th UEFA Champions League appearance in a 1–0 home win over Manchester City on 25 November 2015, becoming the second French player to do so after Thierry Henry. Evra scored a goal in the last match of the 2015–16 Serie A season on 14 May 2016, in a 5–0 home win over Sampdoria, as Juventus celebrated winning the league title for a fifth consecutive time since the 2011–12 season. On 6 June 2016, Evra signed a one-year contract extension with Juventus; the deal included an option for a further extension of one year.

=== Marseille ===
On 25 January 2017, Evra joined Marseille on a free transfer, signing an 18-month contract with the club. On 7 May 2017, he scored his only goal for Marseille in a 2–1 win over his former club Nice.

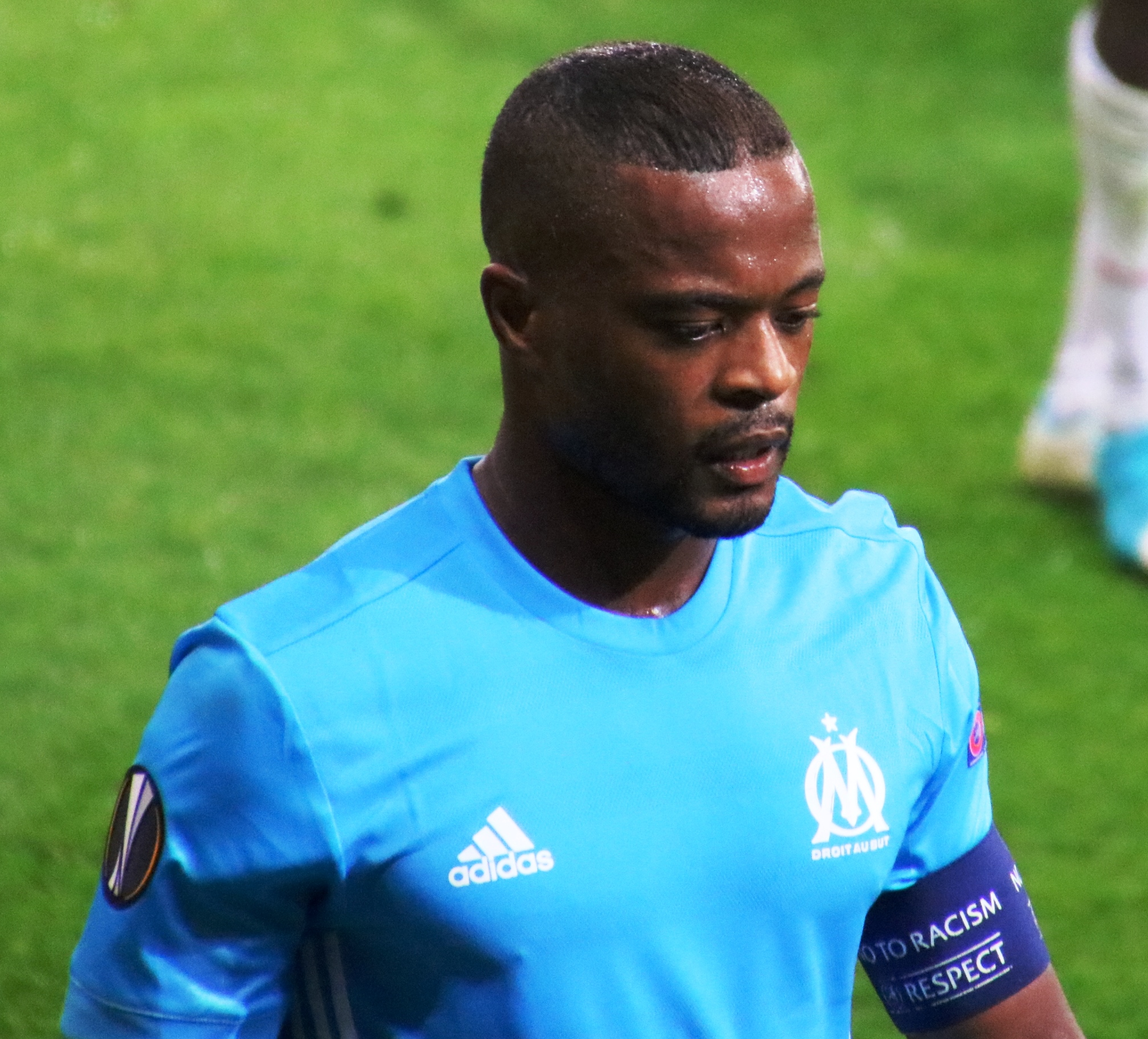
Evra with Marseille in September 2017

In the warm-up preceding a Europa League match on 2 November 2017, Evra was sent off for kicking a spectating Marseille fan in the head, who was reportedly "ridiculing" him as he trained. Marseille coach Rudi Garcia was critical of the fans, but also criticized Evra for reacting to the provocation. On 3 November, the day after Evra's altercation with a fan, he was suspended from playing indefinitely by Marseille, pending an interview with the player regarding his conduct and further investigation before any other sanctions are imposed on him. Marseille released a statement concerning the incident, condemning Evra's actions. He also received a charge of violent conduct from UEFA as a consequence. Evra also received a UEFA ban that made him ineligible to play in any UEFA competitions until June 2018. Marseille subsequently terminated Evra's contract with immediate effect.

=== West Ham United ===
On 7 February 2018, West Ham United signed Evra on a free transfer. He signed a contract until the end of June 2018. He made his debut against Liverpool on 24 February. Evra departed West Ham United when his contract expired at the end of the season, having made five appearances for the club. Evra remained a free agent for a year before finally announcing his retirement from professional football in July 2019.

=== Brentham ===
In a bid to build fitness ahead of Soccer Aid 2020, Evra made a one-off appearance for Middlesex County League Premier Division club Brentham in a 3–2 friendly defeat to North Greenford United on 29 August 2020.

== International career ==
=== Under-21s ===
Evra is a former French youth international having played for the under-21 team. Due to harboring in Italy during his development years, he failed to earn call-ups with teams below the under-21 level. Evra earned his first call-up to the under-21 team under coach Raymond Domenech on 3 October 2002 for matches against Slovenia and Malta. He made his under-21 debut in the match against Slovenia as France cruised to a 1–0 victory. Evra was forced to miss the match against Malta after suffering an injury in the win over Slovenia. The defender regularly appeared for the team through 2002–2004 as France attempted to qualify for both the 2004 UEFA European Under-21 Football Championship and the football tournament at the 2004 Summer Olympics. France failed to qualify for both competitions, which resulted in the end of Evra's youth career.

=== Senior team ===
==== Early years ====
Evra earned his first call-up to the senior national team in May 2004 after coach Jacques Santini named him to the 31-man preliminary squad to participate in UEFA Euro 2004. Following the trimming of the squad to 23 players, Evra was not included and subsequently missed out on the competition. Following the European Championship, with former under-21 coach Domenech now coaching the team, Evra was called up to the senior team for its friendly against Bosnia and Herzegovina on 18 August 2004. The defender admitted that he was "very proud" to have been called up to the team. Evra made his senior international debut in the match against Bosnia and Herzegovina. He started on the left wing before being substituted in the 75th minute for Robert Pires. The match ended in a 1–1 draw.

Due to an injury to starter Eric Abidal, Evra supplanted him and appeared as the starting left-back in France's first two 2006 FIFA World Cup qualification matches. After being called up for the team's March 2005 friendly against Switzerland, Evra was forced to withdraw from the team due to injury. As a result, William Gallas was inserted in the role as a makeshift left-back. Following Abidal's return from injury and, due to Domenech preferring Mikaël Silvestre as the incumbent's back-up, Evra went without a call-up for almost two years and, consequently, missed the 2006 World Cup. In October 2007, the defender explained to L'Équipe that the World Cup snub "gave me my determination".

==== Euro 2008 ====
Evra returned to the team in November 2006 for the team's friendly match against Greece. He appeared as a half-time substitute for Abidal as France won the match 1–0. After going another year without representing France, Evra began appearing as a regular under Domenech in 2007. On 28 May 2008, he was included in the squad to participate in UEFA Euro 2008. He was initially placed onto the squad to serve as back-up to Abidal, however after failing to appear in the team's opening 0–0 draw with Romania, there were calls from the French media urging Domenech to insert Evra into the starting line-up at the behest of Abidal. Domenech relented and started Evra in the team's next match against the Netherlands, which ended in a 4–1 defeat. In the must-win final group stage match against Italy, Evra started his second consecutive match, but France lost 2–0 and were eliminated from the competition in the first round. Following the match, cameras witnessed Evra and teammates Patrick Vieira and Abidal getting into an altercation in the tunnel. Vieira later stated the video was shot after he got into an argument with a set of French supporters. A day after the team's elimination, Evra admitted his frustration to L'Équipe, stating, "I am someone who does not like losing but I'm not going to make excuses. We had three games in this Euro, we have not won one. It's even hard to believe, to say it's over now."

==== 2010 World Cup and exclusion ====
"Tonight it's time for the big apology towards the thousands of French people, because I share the pain of all these French people. What hurts even more is that this apology should have been made yesterday, but my coach stopped me doing it as a captain, and that hurts even more. But it won't change anything, now is not the time to settle scores. I have nothing to hide. The French team doesn't belong to anyone, it belongs to all of these French people. People need to know the truth, the causes of this enormous disaster."

— Evra, commenting following France's elimination from the 2010 FIFA World Cup.

After Euro 2008, defensive stalwart Lilian Thuram retired from the team. To mitigate his absence, Domenech moved Abidal into the centre-back position, allowing Evra to take over as starting left-back. In the team's first competitive match since Euro 2008, against Austria, Evra provided the assist for France's only goal scored by Sidney Govou in a surprising 3–1 defeat. During the 2010 FIFA World Cup qualification campaign, Evra participated in ten of the team's 12 matches, which included both legs in the team's playoff round win over the Republic of Ireland. On 26 May 2010, Evra captained the national team for the first time in a friendly match against Costa Rica; France won the match 2–1. He was subsequently named the captain for the 2010 World Cup ahead of Thierry Henry, who was relegated to the bench for the tournament. Evra wore the armband in the team's first two matches, a 0–0 draw with Uruguay and a 2–0 loss to Mexico.

On 19 June 2010, striker Nicolas Anelka was dismissed from the squad after reportedly having a dispute, in which obscenities were passed, with Domenech during half-time of the team's loss to Mexico. The resulting disagreement over Anelka's exclusion between the players, the coaching staff and France Football Federation (FFF) officials resulted in Evra leading a player protest against the decision on 20 June, in which the players refused to train. Prior to leading the revolt, Evra had got into a verbal argument with national team fitness coach Robert Duverne. The strike was denounced by the FFF as well as French government officials. The following day, the players returned to training without incident. As a result of the mutiny, Evra was stripped of the captaincy and benched for the team's final group stage match against hosts South Africa. France lost 2–1 and were eliminated from the competition.

Following the competition, former national team captain Lilian Thuram stated that Evra should be banned permanently from playing for the national team. His sentiments were later echoed by Sports Minister Chantal Jouanno, who declared, "I have nothing against Evra but, as a France player and especially captain, he did not defend the values of sport which are shared by the Republic. I am sure there exist other talents who have not sullied France and are waiting for the chance to write new history". On 6 August, Evra was one of five players summoned to attend a hearing held by the Disciplinary Committee of the FFF in response to the team's strike at the World Cup. On 17 August, he received a five-match international ban for his part in the incident.

==== Return to the national team and Euro 2012 ====
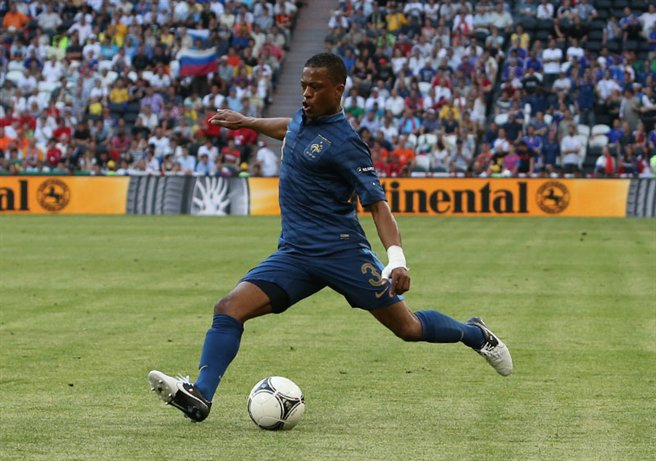
Evra in action for France in their Euro 2012 group stage match against England on 11 June

As a result of being captain, Evra bore the brunt of the criticism. However, despite the public ridicule, Evra maintained his stance regarding his future with the national team, stating, "I can't see my future without the France team." On 17 March 2011, he was called up to the national team by new manager Laurent Blanc for the first time since the 2010 World Cup. He had been eligible to return to the team since the previous month after serving his five-match suspension, however he was not called up to the team by Blanc, with the manager citing "sporting reasons" as the reason. Evra made his return to the team on 25 March in the team's Euro 2012 qualifying match against Luxembourg. He started the match and played the full 90 minutes in a 2–0 win. Four days later, Evra appeared on the bench in his first match at the Stade de France since the World Cup, against Croatia. After appearing regularly in qualifying for Euro 2012, on 29 May 2012, he was named to the 23-man squad to participate in the finals of the competition. France were eliminated in the quarter-finals following a 2–0 defeat against eventual champions Spain.

==== 2014 World Cup and Euro 2016 runners-up ====
Evra played four of France's five matches at the 2014 World Cup, in which they were eliminated in the quarter-finals by the eventual champions Germany.

In May 2016, Evra was named in Didier Deschamps's 23-man France squad for Euro 2016, to be played on home soil. On 10 June, he was later included in the starting line-up for France's opening match of the tournament against Romania, playing the entire 90 minutes of the fixture. With France leading 1–0, Evra fouled Nicușor Stanciu in the penalty box; Bogdan Stancu scored the resulting penalty in the 65th minute. The hosts eventually won the match 2–1, although Evra was later criticised for his performance. In the semi-final against Germany on 7 July, Evra drew praise from the media as he helped win a penalty for his team and produced a strong defensive performance to help France keep a clean-sheet and defeat the reigning world champions 2–0 to advance to the final of the competition. Following the victory, he was also lauded for his leadership and his role in using his experience to unite the team. In the final, France suffered a 1–0 extra-time defeat to Portugal.

== Style of play ==
Evra is a fast left-back known for his acceleration. Despite his size, he is physically strong and good in the air, allowing him to play as a centre-back on occasion. In addition to his physical attributes, he is a technically proficient player with good vision who is comfortable in possession and frequently advances into attacking positions as a wing-back, where he can deliver crosses to teammates. Earlier in his career, he also played as a winger earlier on in his career. He is also been noted for his leadership and tenacity on the pitch.

== Family and personal life ==
=== Family ===
Evra was born in Dakar, the capital city of Senegal. His father was a Senegalese national of Bissau-Guinean ancestry, while his mother, Juliette, was a Cape Verdean national. His father divorced three times and had 24 children; as of 2007, two of these children are deceased. One of his brothers, Mamadou, changed his name to Claude in order to get a job in France. Evra was raised in Catholicism and has said that his father held anti-Muslim views.

Evra's father was a diplomat and, when Evra was a year old, moved to Brussels in Belgium to work at the Senegalese embassy. After over two years living in Belgium, when Evra was three, the family moved to France and settled in Les Ulis, a commune south of Paris. The family first settled in the local Bergeries neighbourhood before moving to the Hautes Plaines quarter shortly after. Evra was raised on Senegalese culture and values that quickly became "Westernised". At age 10, he returned to Senegal for a short period, describing the return as "not a good experience" primarily because he went back to the country to undergo circumcision. He had not returned to the country as of 2011. Ahead of the 2010 World Cup, Evra revealed he had suffered abuse from supporters of the Senegal national team for choosing to represent France internationally over his country of birth.

Evra earned good marks in school.

He was married to Sandra with whom he has a son, Lenny and a daughter, Maona. As of 2020, Evra and his wife are separated and he is engaged to Danish model Margaux Alexandra.

=== Personal life ===
Evra speaks five languages: his native French, English, Italian, Spanish and Portuguese. He is allergic to eggs, a condition which he did not discover until an examination by Juventus. He participated in the Shoot for Love Challenge, raising funds for children suffering from cancer, organised by the Guus Hiddink Foundation.

In March 2019, Evra denied making homophobic comments against Paris Saint-Germain. In January 2022, he spoke about homosexuality in football, where he said that many teammates, who rejected the idea of having a gay teammate, distanced themselves from him due to his position of accepting gay players. Evra said that he had friendships with players who were gay but that were afraid of coming out publicly. Evra was a pundit on ITV for the 2018 FIFA World Cup. In September 2019, he returned to Manchester United as a trainee coach while completing his professional coaching badges. He spent time with the club's Academy coaching staff for a period. Evra announced his autobiography, I Love This Game, in 2021. In October 2021, he alleged that he was sexually abused by a teacher when he was 13. He said that he was interviewed by police at the age of 24 in regards to the abuse, however, he denied it. Evra was a participant on the BBC's Freeze the Fear with Wim Hof in 2022. In February 2023, Evra was convicted, fined and ordered to pay compensation to two anti-hate campaigns by a Parisian court, for the homophobic remarks he made in the video from 2019. In May 2023, Evra was part of the MYFC consortium that bought Portuguese club Estrela da Amadora. The team won promotion to the Primeira Liga via the playoffs days later.

In July 2024, Evra has been found guilty by a French court of abandoning his wife and their two children and handed a suspended 12-month prison sentence. He also owes over £800k in unpaid alimony.

In April 2025, it was announced that Evra had signed a contract with the Professional Fighters League to compete in an amateur mixed martial arts bout. He was expected to make his debut at PFL Europe 2 on 23 May 2025, against a to be announced opponent. However, in early May, it was announced that this event had been cancelled.

== Career statistics ==
=== Club ===
Appearances and goals by club, season and competition
Club	Season	League			National cup (Note: Includes Coppa Italia, Coupe de France, FA Cup)		League cup (Note: Includes Coupe de la Ligue, Football League Cup)		Europe (Note: All appearances in UEFA Champions League, unless otherwise noted)		Other		Total	
Club	Season	Division	Apps	Goals	Apps	Goals	Apps	Goals	Apps	Goals	Apps	Goals	Apps	Goals
Marsala	1998–99	Serie C1	24	3	3	3	—		—		—		27	6
Monza	1999–2000	Serie B	3	0	0	0	—		—		—		3	0
Nice	2000–01	French Division 2	5	0	0	0	0	0	—		—		5	0
Nice	2001–02	French Division 2	35	1	1	0	1	0	—		—		37	1
Nice	Total		67	1	1	0	1	0	—		—		42	1
Monaco	2002–03	Ligue 1	36	2	1	0	4	0	—		—		41	2
Monaco	2003–04	Ligue 1	33	0	1	0	0	0	13	0	—		47	0
Monaco	2004–05	Ligue 1	36	0	5	1	2	0	9	0	—		52	1
Monaco	2005–06	Ligue 1	15	0	0	0	1	0	7 (Note: Two appearances in UEFA Champions League, five appearances in UEFA Cup)	0	—		23	0
Monaco	Total		120	2	7	1	7	0	29	0	—		163	3
Manchester United	2005–06	Premier League	11	0	1	0	2	0	0	0	—		14	0
Manchester United	2006–07	Premier League	24	1	4	0	1	0	7	1	—		36	2
Manchester United	2007–08	Premier League	33	0	4	0	0	0	10	0	1 (Note: Appearance in FA Community Shield)	0	48	0
Manchester United	2008–09	Premier League	28	0	3	0	2	0	11	0	4 (Note: One appearance in FA Community Shield, one appearance in UEFA Super Cup, two appearances in FIFA Club World Cup)	0	48	0
Manchester United	2009–10	Premier League	38	0	0	0	3	0	9	0	1	0	51	0
Manchester United	2010–11	Premier League	35	1	3	0	0	0	10	0	0	0	48	1
Manchester United	2011–12	Premier League	37	0	2	0	0	0	7	0	1	0	47	0
Manchester United	2012–13	Premier League	34	4	3	0	0	0	5	0	—		42	4
Manchester United	2013–14	Premier League	33	1	0	0	3	1	8	1	1	0	45	3
Manchester United	Total		273	7	20	0	11	1	67	2	8	0	379	10
Juventus	2014–15	Serie A	21	1	2	0	—		10	0	1 (Note: Appearance in Supercoppa Italiana)	0	34	1
Juventus	2015–16	Serie A	26	2	2	0	—		6	0	1	0	35	2
Juventus	2016–17	Serie A	6	0	0	0	—		6	0	1	0	13	0
Juventus	Total		53	3	4	0	—		22	0	3	0	82	3
Marseille	2016–17	Ligue 1	11	1	1	0	0	0	—		—		12	1
Marseille	2017–18	Ligue 1	4	0	0	0	0	0	5 (Note: Appearances in UEFA Europa League)	0	—		9	0
Marseille	Total		15	1	1	0	0	0	5	0	—		21	1
West Ham United	2017–18	Premier League	5	0	—		—		—		—		5	0
Career total			533	17	36	4	19	1	123	2	11	0	734	24

=== International ===
Appearances and goals by national team and year

National team	Season	Apps	Goals
France	2004–05	5	0
France	2005–06	0	0
France	2006–07	1	0
France	2007–08	7	0
France	2008–09	7	0
France	2009–10	12	0
France	2010–11	3	0
France	2011–12	7	0
France	2012–13	7	0
France	2013–14	13	0
France	2014–15	4	0
France	2015–16	14	0
France	2016–17	1	0
Total		81	0

== Honours ==
Monaco

- Coupe de la Ligue: 2002–03
- UEFA Champions League runner-up: 2003–04

Manchester United

- Premier League: 2006–07, 2007–08, 2008–09, 2010–11, 2012–13
- Football League Cup: 2005–06, 2008–09, 2009–10
- FA Community Shield: 2007, 2008, 2010, 2011, 2013
- UEFA Champions League: 2007–08; runner-up: 2008–09, 2010–11
- FIFA Club World Cup: 2008
- FA Cup runner-up: 2006–07

Juventus

- Serie A: 2014–15, 2015–16
- Coppa Italia: 2014–15, 2015–16
- Supercoppa Italiana: 2015
- UEFA Champions League runner-up: 2014–15

France

- UEFA European Championship runner-up: 2016

Individual

- UNFP Ligue 1 Young Player of the Year: 2003–04
- UNFP Ligue 1 Team of the Year: 2003–04
- PFA Premier League Team of the Year: 2006–07, 2008–09, 2009–10
- FIFA FIFPro World XI: 2009
- UEFA Team of the Year: 2009

== Filmography ==
Television
Year	Title	Role	Notes	Ref.
2018-2023	A League of Their Own	Himself	Game Show	
2022	Freeze the Fear with Wim Hof	Himself	Reality Show	
2022	Munya and Filly Get Chilly	Himself	Reality Show	
2023	The Overlap on Tour	Himself	Sports Comedy	
2024	Big Zuu's 12 Dishes in 12 Hours	Himself	Documentary	
2025	Inside	Himself	Reality Show	

Film
Year	Title	Role	Notes	Ref.
2020	Anelka: Misunderstood	Himself	Documentary	
2024	Numéro 10	Himself	Sports Comedy	

Web Roles
Year	Title	Role	Network(s)	Notes	Ref.
2022	The Mandela Project	Himself	YouTube	YouTube Series	

== See also ==
- List of footballers with 100 or more UEFA Champions League appearances
