= Joseph Kaucsar =

Association football player (1904–1986)

Personal information
- Date of birth: 20 September 1904
- Place of birth: Abeuth, Austria-Hungary
- Date of death: 5 January 1986 (aged 81)
- Height: 1.74 m (5 ft 9 in)
- Position: Midfielder

Senior career*
Years	Team	Apps	(Gls)
1925–1931	Stade Raphaëlois		
1931–1940	SO Montpellier		

International career
1931–1934	France	15	(0)

Managerial career
- 1936–1937: SO Montpellier
- * Club domestic league appearances and goals

Kaucsár József (in Hungarian) or Iosif Kaucsar (in Romanian) (20 September 1904 – 1986), known in France as Joseph Kaucsar, was a footballer who played for SO Montpellier and the France national team. His brother, Alfred Kaucsar, was also a footballer, they played together at SO Montpellier.

Kaucsár was born near the border between Hungary and Romania. He acquired French nationality by naturalization on 8 April 1930 and was working as a mechanic.
