= Samir Zamfir =

Romanian footballer

Personal information
- Full name: Samir Ionel Zamfir
- Date of birth: 7 October 1967 (age 59)
- Place of birth: Craiova, Romania
- Position: Midfielder

Senior career*
Years	Team	Apps	(Gls)
1986–1987	FC Universitatea Craiova		
1987–1995	Electroputere Craiova		
1995–1997	Martigues	16	(1)
1997–1998	Hapoel Ashkelon		
- * Club domestic league appearances and goals

Samir Ionel Zamfir (born 7 October 1967) is a retired Romanian football midfielder.
