= Robert Lemaître =

French footballer (1929–2019)

Personal information
- Date of birth: 7 March 1929
- Place of birth: Plancoët, France
- Date of death: 9 March 2019 (aged 90)
- Height: 1.78 m (5 ft 10 in)
- Position: Defender

Youth career
- Plancoët
- Samsonnaise Doloise
- La Sansonnaise
- Saint-Servan

Senior career*
Years	Team	Apps	(Gls)
1951	La Malouine		
1951–1953	Rennes		
1953–1956	Lille		
1956–1957	Le Havre		
1957–1958	Bordeaux		
1958–1960	Roubaix-Tourcoing		

International career
1953–1954	France	2	(0)

Managerial career
- 1959: Roubaix-Tourcoing
- 1964–1965: Brive
- 1969–1970: Kabylie
- * Club domestic league appearances and goals

Robert Lemaître (7 March 1929 – 9 March 2019) was a former French professional footballer who played as a defender.

== Career ==
Lemaître was born in Plancoët, a commune in the Brittany region. He began his career playing for his hometown club. In 1951, he turned professional and signed with Rennes. Lemaître spent two seasons with the club and, in 1953, signed with Lille. With Lille, he won the league in 1954 and won the Coupe de France the following year. After leaving Lille, Lemaître played for Le Havre, Bordeaux, and Roubaix-Tourcoing before retiring from football altogether in 1960.

Lemaître was also a France international and made his national team debut on 17 December 1953 in an 8–0 victory over Luxembourg. In the match, Lemaître captained the team. He is one of five France internationals in the team's history to captain the national team on his debut.
