= Henri Pavillard =

French footballer (born 1905–1978)

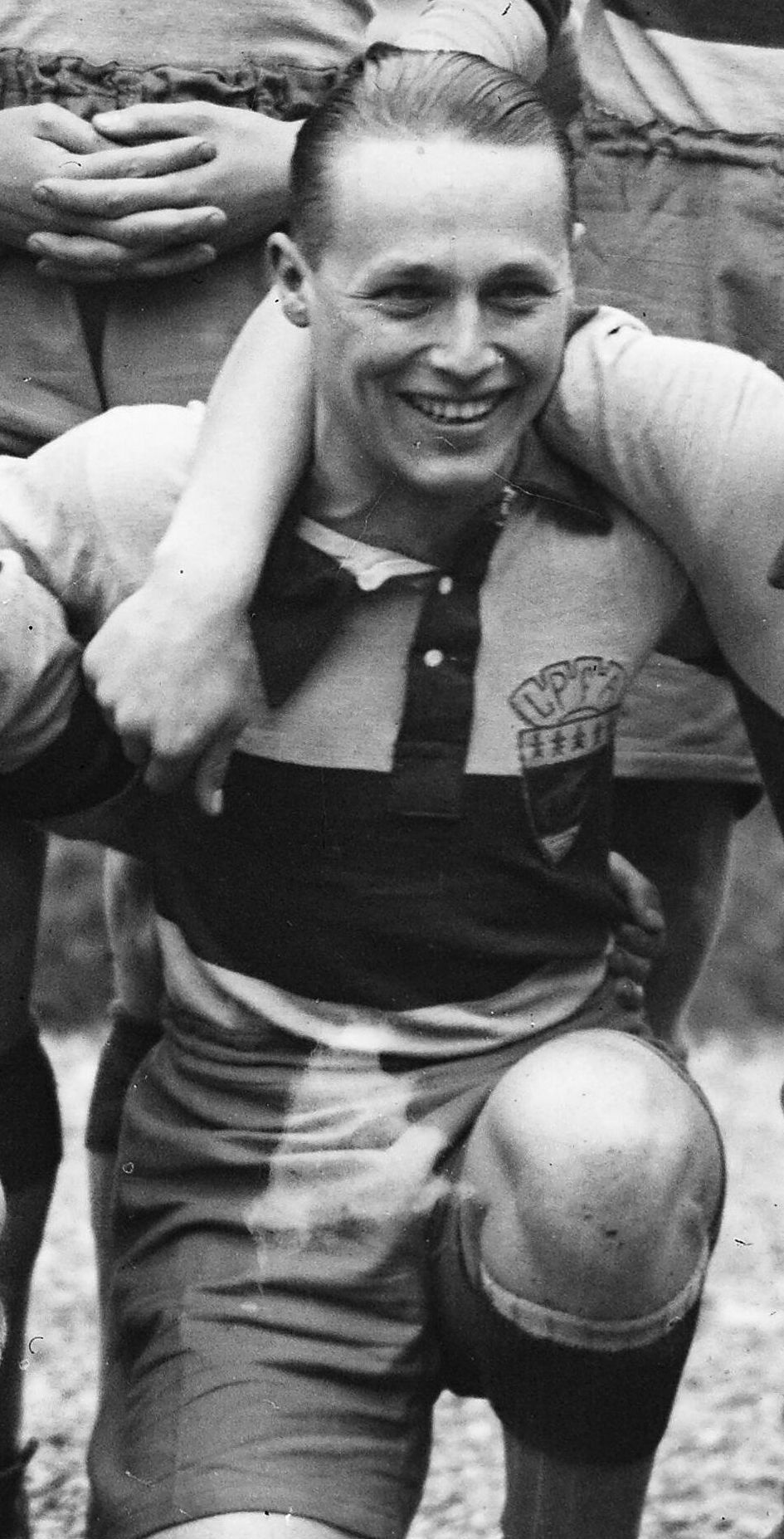
- Pavillard in 1928

Personal information
- Full name: Henri Léon Jean Pavillard
- Date of birth: 15 August 1905
- Place of birth: Héricourt, Haute-Saône, France
- Date of death: 29 January 1978 (aged 72)
- Place of death: Paris, France
- Position: Midfielder

Senior career*
| Years | Team | Apps | (Gls) |
- Stade Français
- AS Saint-Eugène

International career
| 1928–1932 | France | 14 | (1) |
- * Club domestic league appearances and goals

Henri Léon Jean Pavillard (15 August 1905 – 29 January 1978) was a French international footballer. He is mostly known for his international career and his club stint at Stade Français. After playing for Stade Français, Pavillard spent his declining years playing in French Algeria with AS Saint-Eugène. He made his international debut on 29 April 1928 in a 1–1 draw with Portugal. Pavillard was a member of the team that participated in the football tournament at the 1928 Summer Olympics. He captained the national team four times and scored his only goal in his final appearance with the team; a 5–2 defeat to Belgium.
