= Alfred Kaucsar =

Romanian footballer

Personal information
- Date of birth: 8 April 1913
- Place of birth: Târgu Mureș, Austria-Hungary
- Date of death: March 02, 2000
- Place of death: Trévoux, Ain, France
- Position: Defender

Senior career*
Years	Team	Apps	(Gls)
1934–1938	SO Montpellier		
1938–1939	Sochaux		
1943	Lyon		
1944	Rennes		
1944–1949	Sochaux		
- * Club domestic league appearances and goals as of 24 May 2021

Alfred Kaucsar (born 8 April 1913) was a Romanian footballer who played for as a defender. His brother, Joseph Kaucsar, was also a footballer, they played together at SO Montpellier. Alfred Kaucsar was the first Romanian footballer that played for Lyon.
