= René Bonnet (footballer) =

French footballer

Personal information
- Date of birth: 1880
- Place of birth: France
- Date of death: Unknown
- Position: Defender

Senior career*
Years	Team	Apps	(Gls)
1913–1914	AS Française		

International career
1913	Northern France	+1	(0)
1914	France	1	(0)
- * Club domestic league appearances and goals

René Bonnet was a French footballer who played as a defender for AS Française and the French national team in 1913–14.

== Biography ==
Very little is known about his life; Bonnet was playing football for AS Française in 1913, when the USFSA selected him to play for the so-called Lions des Flandres, a regional scratch team representing Northern France, in a friendly match against the English Wanderers on 1 November; he scored an own goal in an eventual 1–4 loss.

Three months later, on 8 February 1914, Bonnet earned his first (and only) international cap for France in an away friendly against Luxembourg, playing the full 90 minutes both as a defender and as a captain as France suffered a 5–4 loss. His date of birth is unknown, but the most frequently cited year is 1880, which means that he would have been 33 or 34 years old during his only international match, which seems quite improbable given that 30-year-old players were extremely rare in the French team before the First World War. If true, he was the first 30-year-old player in the history of the Bleus, and held the record for the oldest player in the French national team for over 14 years until May 1928, when Juste Brouzes played his last match for France at the age of 34 years and 132 days.

Two weeks after his international debut, on 22 February, Bonnet helped AS Française claim the 1913–14 USFSA Paris championship.

== Honours ==
AS Française

- USFSA Paris Championship:
  - Champions (1): 1913–14
