= Claude Quittet =

French footballer (born 1941)

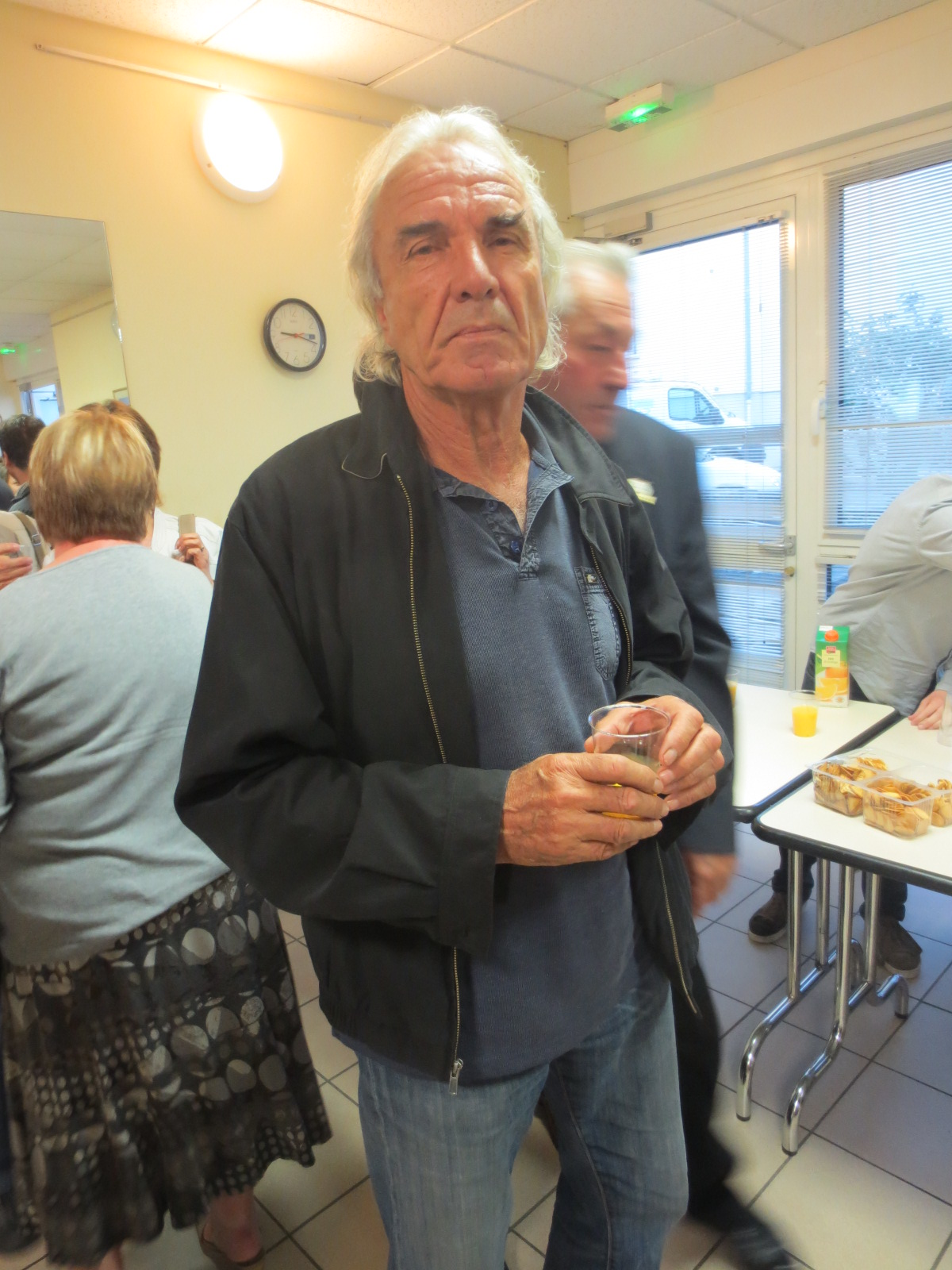
- Quittet in 2013

Personal information
- Full name: Claude Quittet
- Date of birth: March 12, 1941 (age 85)
- Place of birth: Mathay, France
- Position: Defender

Youth career
- 1958–1962: FC Sochaux

Senior career*
Years	Team	Apps	(Gls)
1962–1969	FC Sochaux	?	(?)
1969–1973	OGC Nice	?	(?)
1973–1974	AS Monaco	29	(4)
1974–1976	Besançon RC	?	(?)

International career
1967–1973	France	16	(0)
- * Club domestic league appearances and goals

Claude Quittet (French: [klod kitɛ]; born 12 March 1941) is a French former football defender.

He played for FC Sochaux, OGC Nice, AS Monaco and Besançon RC.
