= Football in Paris =

Map showing the four largest Parisian football clubs.

Football in Paris dates back to the late 19th century, when the sport first developed in the French capital. Early competitions, including the USFSA Football Championship, were largely limited to Paris and nearby areas, leading to frequent top-level derbies. Clubs such as Standard Athletic Club, Club Français, and The White Rovers emerged as leading sides of this formative period, contesting the first league titles and playing a central role in the development and popularization of football in France.

During the first half of the 20th century, Parisian football was shaped by clubs such as Racing Club de France Football and Red Star FC, both of which enjoyed sustained success in domestic competitions, particularly the Coupe de France. However, as French football professionalized, the rise of strong provincial sides gradually reduced the prominence of Parisian teams in the top flight, leading many historic clubs to experience decline or relegation.

By the late 1960s, efforts were made to re-establish a major Parisian presence in the first division. Paris FC was founded in 1969, followed by the creation of Paris Saint-Germain FC in 1970. PSG went on to become the city's most successful club, while PFC struggled to regain top-flight status. Paris FC's promotion to Ligue 1 in 2025 marked the first time in decades that the capital was represented by more than one club in the top tier, signaling a potential revival of competitive football in Paris.

In contrast, the Paris derby has gained greater sporting significance in women's football. Paris Saint-Germain FC (women) emerged as a major force following its professionalization in 2012, winning several national titles. Paris FC (women) was the capital's dominant side during the 1990s and 2000s and re-established itself as a leading contender in the early 2020s. Alongside PSG, Paris FC is one of the few clubs capable of regularly challenging the dominance of OL Lyonnes.

== Men's football ==
=== Early Parisian rivalries ===
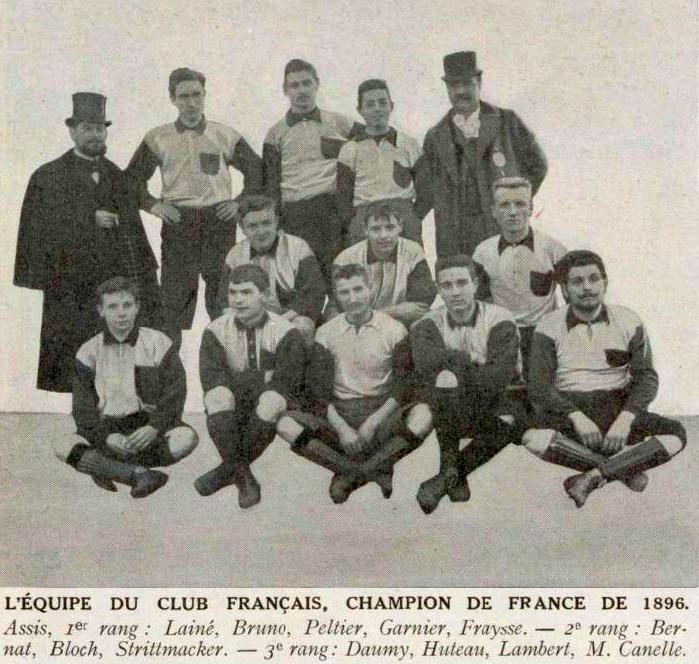
Club Français, champions of France in 1896.

Since the origins of French football, several rivalries have existed within the capital city. The first French football championship, held in 1894, was limited to Paris and its surrounding areas and featured six Parisian clubs, resulting in frequent top-flight derbies during this early period. The most prominent rivalry involved three of the competition's founders—Standard Athletic Club, The White Rovers, and Club Français—which emerged as the dominant teams of the era. Together, they contested the first five league titles, with Standard winning four, Club Français claiming one, and the Rovers finishing runners-up on four occasions.

Played in a knockout cup format, the inaugural championship was won by Standard, who defeated the Rovers over two matches in the first-ever all-Paris final. The Rovers had entered as favourites after beating Club Français 1–0 in the semi-finals, courtesy of a late goal by Mac Bain. The first match, played on 29 April 1894, ended in a 2–2 draw after extra time, before a replay on 5 May saw Standard secure a 2–0 victory. Standard repeated the feat in 1895, again overcoming the Rovers in the final with a 3–1 win.

In 1896, the championship adopted a league format. The Rovers won seven of their eight matches, recording a goal difference of 35–2, with their only defeat coming against champions Club Français, and finished runners-up for the third consecutive season. In 1897, the Rovers finished level on points with Standard at the top of the table. As goal difference was not used as a tiebreaker at the time, a deciding match was arranged. Although the Rovers had defeated Standard during the league season, they lost the final 3–2, leaving them without a title for the fourth consecutive year. The club subsequently declined, struggling to attract players, and after two further seasons without contending for the title, the Rovers were dissolved in 1899.

Standard won the championship again in 1898, defeating Club Français in the final, and went on to claim their fifth and final title in 1901, despite the competition being opened to clubs from outside Paris in 1899. The British-only club withdrew from football in 1928 after the French Football Federation (FFF) required all players to hold French residency, but continued to exist thereafter as a British social club in Paris. During the amateur era of the French championship (25 editions between 1894 and 1932), clubs from Paris won ten titles: five by Standard, one by Club Français, and one each by Gallia Club Paris, Racing Club de France Football, CA Paris-Charenton, and Stade Français.

=== From dominance to decline ===
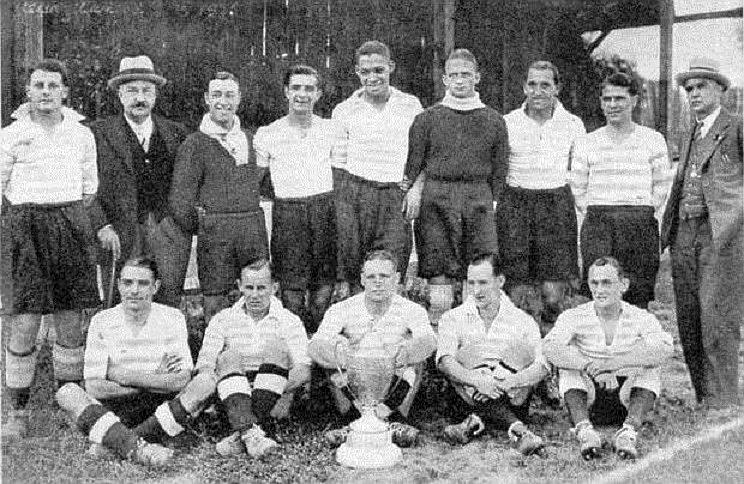
The Racing team that won the Ligue 1 and Coupe de France double in 1936.

Parisian clubs were equally dominant in the Coupe de France, winning 15 of the first 32 editions, including the first six. Olympique de Paris claimed the inaugural title in 1918, followed by CASG Paris—who denied Olympique a second consecutive crown in the first all-Paris final in 1919—and CA Paris in 1920. Red Star FC, the leading Parisian side of the 1920s, then secured three consecutive titles, becoming the first club to achieve a hat-trick. In the 1921 edition, Red Star notably defeated Racing 4–3 in the semi-finals at the Parc des Princes before winning the final against Olympique, with goalkeeper Pierre Chayriguès playing a decisive role. At the time, the club played in blue and white, but in 1926 it merged with Olympique and adopted the green and white colours still used today.

The hegemony of Parisian clubs continued as Red Star defeated Stade Français 8–2 in the semi-finals and CA Paris 3–1 in the 1928 Coupe de France final, capturing their fourth title in what remains the last all-Paris final to date. CASG and Club Français later added two further Parisian cup victories. In 1932, Red Star, Racing, CA Paris, and Club Français were among the founding members of the professional league launched for the 1932–33 season. The first Parisian derby of the professional era was played on 11 November 1932, when Red Star lost 4–3 to CA Paris at the Stade Bauer. Club Français forward Robert Mercier secured the inaugural top scorer title with 15 goals, thanks to a hat-trick in the final match against Racing, which ended in a 5–5 draw.

Racing and Red Star were at the center of the Parisian rivalry from the 1930s to the 1960s, with Racing holding the upper hand, most notably by winning the Ligue 1 and Coupe de France double in 1936. Racing went on to win the Coupe de France four more times after 1936, with their final title in 1949, while Red Star lifted the trophy once more in 1942—both marking their last major honours. As French football gradually professionalized, the national landscape shifted, and Parisian clubs fell behind major provincial sides such as Sète, Sochaux, and Marseille. CA Paris was relegated in 1934, while Club Français dissolved due to financial difficulties in 1935. Gallia Club Paris, despite a 1926 merger with Stade d'Ivry, also disbanded in 1940. CASG Paris opted not to join the professional ranks in 1933 and instead remained an amateur club until its dissolution in 1951.

During the 1946–47 and 1947–48 seasons, Stade Français competed alongside Racing and Red Star in the top flight, marking the only instance of three Parisian clubs doing so. In 1946, Stade Français lost 3–2 to Red Star in the Coupe de France semi-finals, decided by a last-minute goal from Paul Bersoullé. Stade Français gained revenge in 1948 with a 7–0 victory over Red Star, who were subsequently relegated. Another notable moment occurred during the 1954 relegation playoffs, in which Racing prevailed 4–3 on aggregate, earning promotion to Ligue 1 while sending Stade Français down. In the 1960s, Racing became the first Parisian club to compete in Europe, entering the 1963–64 Inter-Cities Fairs Cup. Stade Français also appeared twice in the competition, defeating Real Betis 2–0 in the 1964–65 season for the first European win by a Parisian side.

=== The emergence of PSG ===
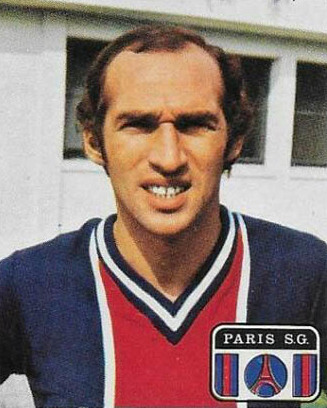
PSG's Carlos Bianchi netted two goals against PFC in 1978.

The late 1960s marked a period of decline for the capital's historic clubs. Racing, based in the northwestern suburb of Colombes, and Stade Français were confined to the amateur leagues, while Red Star, located in the northern suburb of Saint-Ouen-sur-Seine, had passed its prime. To address this void, the FFF initiated the creation of a major inner-city club. Paris FC (PFC) was officially founded in 1969, initially without players, a stadium, or a place in any league. A year later, in 1970, Paris FC merged with Stade Saint-Germain, a club from the western suburb of Saint-Germain-en-Laye that was then competing in Ligue 2. This merger gave rise to Paris Saint-Germain FC (PSG).

PSG won Ligue 2 in their first season, earning promotion to Ligue 1. In their inaugural top-flight campaign, they finished 16th, retaining their status, and claimed their first Parisian derby victory by defeating Red Star 4–1 at the Stade Yves-du-Manoir. At season's end, the Council of Paris, unhappy that the capital's club was based in the suburbs, threatened to withdraw financial support unless it changed its name to Paris FC. PSG president Henri Patrelle refused, and on 20 June 1972, the club split. PSG kept their name but were administratively relegated to Division 3, while Paris FC retained Ligue 1 status, moved into the Parc des Princes, and won both derbies against Red Star in the 1972–73 season.

On 10 November 1973, PSG played their first match at the Parc des Princes against promotion rivals Red Star, winning 3–1, with Othniel Dossevi scoring the club's first goal at the stadium. Both clubs reached Ligue 1 in 1974, the same season Paris FC was relegated. PSG took full ownership of the Parc des Princes and became the dominant club in Paris. Their first Parisian derby in Ligue 1 saw them defeat Red Star 2–0 in front of 27,840 spectators, while a draw in the return fixture marked the clubs' final meeting, as Red Star were relegated at the end of the 1974–75 season.

PSG and Paris FC first met as separate entities during the 1978–79 season, with both league fixtures ending in draws, each featuring a goal from PSG's Argentine striker Carlos Bianchi. PFC was relegated at the end of that campaign, leaving PSG as the capital's sole top-flight club. As a result, the rivalry remained relatively subdued for decades, characterized by infrequent meetings and limited supporter hostility. By contrast, PFC and Red Star developed a far more intense rivalry, marked by violent incidents both on and off the pitch, including clashes between ultras shaped by differing cultural and political identities. Red Star's derby with Racing also persisted in the lower leagues; the two clubs have not met in the top flight since 1948.

=== Lower division derbies ===
Paris FC faced Red Star for the first time on 4 October 1972. Red Star, entering a club-record sixth consecutive season in the top tier, were confident after a six-match unbeaten run. However, Paris FC secured a convincing 3–0 victory at the Parc des Princes and confirmed their superiority in the return fixture, winning 3–2 at the Stade Bauer after trailing 2–0. The defeat proved a turning point for Red Star, as it was followed by an eleven-match winless run that ultimately resulted in relegation to Ligue 2. The rivalry escalated in March 1978 during a Ligue 2 match at Stade Bauer, with both clubs competing for promotion to Ligue 1. A controversial goal by Jean-François Beltramini gave Paris FC the victory; it was never conclusively determined whether the ball had fully crossed the line, leading to allegations of favoritism by the Council of Paris. The match was further marred by disorder after the Paris FC coach was struck by stones following an obscene gesture, culminating in a pitch invasion by Red Star supporters. Paris FC secured promotion, while Red Star subsequently declared bankruptcy.

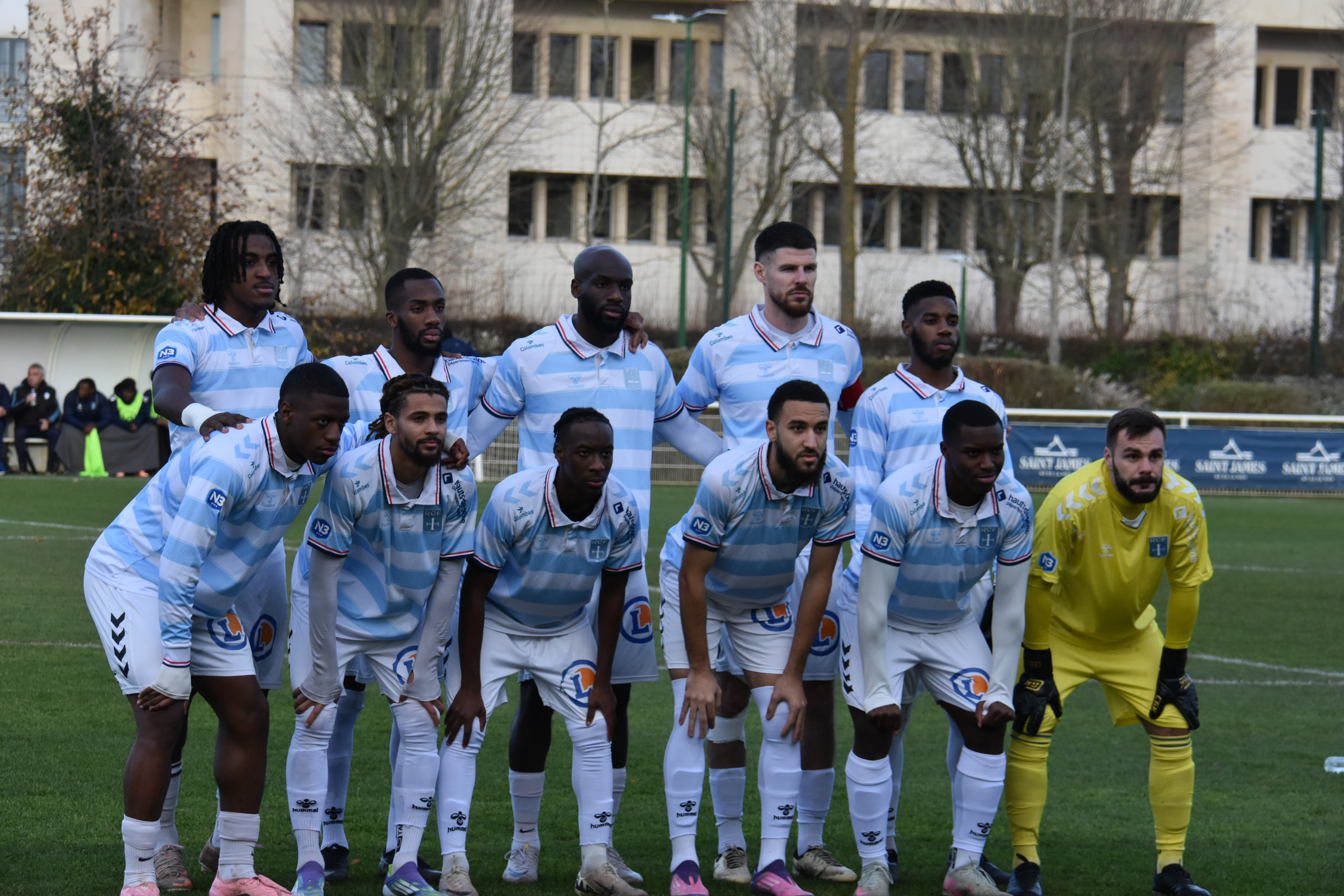
Racing's squad ahead of a fifth-tier match in 2025.

The two clubs faced each other on several occasions in the amateur ranks, including twice in the Coupe de France, with one qualification each. In October 1999, with both teams threatened by relegation in Ligue 3, a last-minute goal from Vincent Doukantié secured Red Star's first league victory over Paris FC. Another notable encounter occurred in September 2011 at the Stade Sébastien Charléty. Against a Paris FC side featuring several former Red Star members, including their manager, Red Star produced a dominant performance, scoring four unanswered goals to record the largest victory in the history of the fixture.

Paris FC responded in September 2014 by recording their first league victory over Red Star since the controversial 1978 encounter, courtesy of a disputed penalty converted by Christian Kinkela. The fixture was preceded by serious clashes between the ultras of both clubs. In April 2016, with both teams competing in Ligue 2, bottom-placed Paris FC stunned Red Star in the highest-scoring match in the history of the derby. Having gone eight months without a win, PFC's 4–2 victory ultimately denied Red Star promotion to Ligue 1. Freshly relegated, Paris FC again spoiled Red Star's campaign the following season, eliminating them from the Coupe de la Ligue on penalties. Both clubs eventually established themselves in Ligue 2, with Paris FC returning to Ligue 1 in 2025.

Concurrently, Racing also clashed with Red Star. Having largely dominated the early years of the rivalry, Racing saw Red Star balance the odds in the lower leagues. Winless since the start of the season, Red Star traveled to the Stade Yves-du-Manoir in August 1983 and secured a 2–1 victory. Backed by the Lagardère Group, Racing had the largest budget in Ligue 2 at the time and aimed for promotion to the top flight, which they achieved at the end of the season despite the surprise defeat. The two sides met again in the round of 32 of the Coupe de France in March 1985. Red Star visited the Parc des Princes, but Racing left no room for surprises, winning 3–0 in the first leg, followed by a draw in the return fixture. Fifteen years passed until their next meeting in March 2000. As part of Red Star's 103rd anniversary celebrations, the club organized their match against Racing at the Stade de France in front of 25,000 spectators. To date, it is the only Ligue 3 match ever played at France's national stadium. Red Star celebrated in style with a 2–1 victory, thanks to a brace from Congolese forward Richard Akiana.

=== Racing's challenge to PSG ===
PSG quickly established themselves in the top flight and began to gain national recognition, winning the Coupe de France in 1982 and qualifying for the 1982–83 European Cup Winners' Cup. It was the first time in more than 30 years that a Parisian team had won the trophy—the previous one being Racing in 1949—as well as the first appearance in European competition by a Parisian club since Stade Français in 1965. PSG won a second consecutive Coupe de France in 1983, another first for a Paris club since Racing achieved the feat 40 years earlier, in 1939 and 1940. Three years later, in 1986, the club was crowned French champion for the first time in its history, becoming one of only two Paris-based clubs to have won the national title in the professional era. The only other was Racing, which had claimed the title 50 years earlier, in 1936. That same year, Racing also won the Coupe de France, becoming the only club from the capital to achieve the domestic double until PSG repeated the feat in 2015.

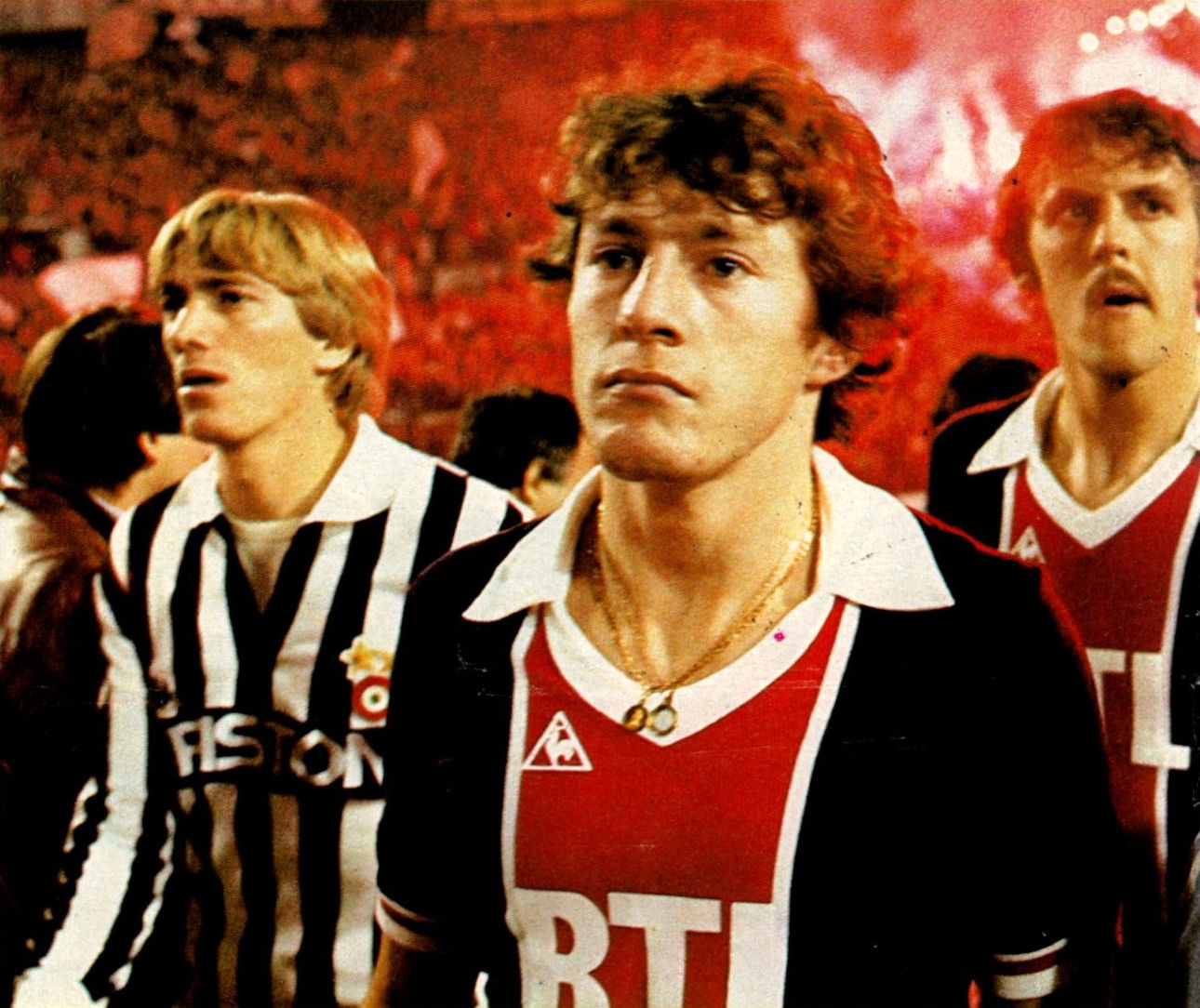
In 1986, Racing signed key PSG player Luis Fernandez.

Simultaneously, French businessman Jean-Luc Lagardère, through the Matra group, acquired Racing in 1982 with the aim of challenging PSG's hegemony in the capital. In 1984, led by Algerian 1982 FIFA World Cup star Rabah Madjer, Racing earned promotion to Ligue 1. The club won the promotion playoff 2–0 against Saint-Étienne at the Stade Geoffroy-Guichard, following a draw in the first leg at a packed Stade Yves-du-Manoir in Colombes in front of 40,000 spectators. However, Lagardère chose to relocate the club from its historic home to the Parc des Princes, where it shared the venue with PSG. This decision was later widely regarded by insiders and players as a strategic mistake. Although a new rivalry emerged, public interest remained limited, and the project struggled to generate a clear identity or lasting emotional attachment.

Racing survived only one season in Ligue 1, but returned at the first attempt in 1986. Lagardère oversaw an ambitious recruitment drive that summer, signing Uruguayan star Enzo Francescoli, West Germany playmaker Pierre Littbarski, and French international Luis Fernandez, recruited from city rivals PSG. Despite Francescoli's goals, the team finished 13th, closer to the relegation places than to qualification for European competition. In 1987, Lagardère appointed Portuguese manager Artur Jorge, who had just won the UEFA Champions League with Porto. Despite a promising third place at mid-season, Racing ended the 1987–88 campaign in seventh place, their best finish during the Matra era. The following season, the club avoided relegation to Ligue 2 only on goal difference and failed to qualify for European competition throughout the period.

Having already invested around 300 million francs, Matra and Jean-Luc Lagardère withdrew their backing in 1989. Racing had been playing in front of near-empty crowds at the Parc des Princes, making it impossible to recoup the heavy expenditure on players and management. Attendances rarely exceeded 10,000 spectators, while PSG regularly attracted at least twice as many. In 1990, Racing finished second from bottom in the league and lost the Coupe de France final 2–1 after extra time against Montpellier, but did record a derby victory before being relegated to Ligue 2. On 25 February 1990, talented young winger and future PSG legend David Ginola featured for Racing in a 2–1 victory at the Parc des Princes, with Aziz Bouderbala scoring both goals. After ten Paris derbies against PSG with a broadly balanced head-to-head record, Racing began the following season back at amateur level, where the club has remained ever since.

=== Return of Paris FC ===
Paris FC spent decades in obscurity, drifting through the lower divisions before re-emerging as Ligue 2 regulars in the 2010s. In 2024, the club was acquired by France's wealthiest family, the Arnaults of luxury empire LVMH, in partnership with Red Bull. Under this new ownership, PFC earned promotion to Ligue 1 in 2025 for the first time in 46 years. PSG, meanwhile, has been bankrolled by Qatar Sports Investments (QSI) since June 2011, becoming one of the richest clubs in the world and claiming a record number of league titles and domestic cups, in addition to winning the UEFA Champions League in 2025. By contrast, PFC has never won a league or cup. Following promotion, PFC moved to the Stade Jean-Bouin, just 20 meters from the Parc des Princes. The proximity makes it the closest professional derby in the world, with the two stadiums separated by a single street.

On 4 January 2026, PSG faced Paris FC at the Parc des Princes in the first top-flight Paris derby since 1990, when Racing had defeated PSG at the same venue 36 years earlier. None of the starters on either side had been born at the time of that match. PSG supporters welcomed Paris FC with a tifo reading "Paris is ours." The match was closely contested, with PSG edging a 2–1 victory. Désiré Doué opened the scoring before Paris FC equalized after half-time through a Willem Geubbels penalty. Parity lasted only two minutes, however, as Ousmane Dembélé scored the decisive goal. The teams met again a week later in the Coupe de France at the same venue, where PSG were eliminated. Former PSG Youth Academy graduate Jonathan Ikoné scored a late winner to secure a 1–0 victory for Paris FC. The defeat marked PSG's first home loss in the competition since 2022 and their first elimination at the round of 32 since 2014.

== Most men's titles ==
As of 2025–26 season.

Club	Domestic titles					European titles				Worldwide titles		Total	Last title	Source									
Club	L1	USFSA	CdF	CdL	TdC	UCL	UCWC	UIC	USC	FCWC	FIC	Total	Last title	Source									
Paris Saint-Germain	L1	USFSA	CdF	CdL	TdC	UCL	UCWC	UIC	USC	FCWC	FIC	14		16	9	14	2	1	1	2	1	60	2026
Racing	1	1	5									7	1949										
Red Star			5									5	1942										
Standard AC		5										5	1901										
CASG Paris			2									2	1925										
Club Français		1	1									2	1931										
CA Paris-Charenton		1	1									2	1920										
Olympique de Paris			1									1	1918										
Stade Français		1										1	1928										
Gallia Club Paris		1										1	1905										

== Notable old derbies ==
Standard Red Star CA Paris CASG Paris Racing The White Rovers Stade Français Draw

22 April 1894 USFSA SF	The White Rovers	1–0	Club Français	Bécon-les-Bruyères
14:55 CEST	Mac Bain 75'	Report		Stadium: Terrain de Bécon; Referee: Georges Caizac
Note: Semi-finals of the first recognized amateur football championship held in France.

29 April 1894 USFSA final	Standard	2–2	The White Rovers	Bécon-les-Bruyères
17:15 CEST	N. Tunmer; A. Tunmer	Report 1 Report 2	J. Wood; Roscoe	Stadium: Terrain de Bécon; Referee: Mr. Daumay (Club Français)
Note: Final of the first recognized amateur football championship held in France.

6 May 1894 USFSA final replay	Standard	2–0	The White Rovers	Bécon-les-Bruyères
17:30 CEST	Hunter 35'; Vines 88'	Report 1 Report 2		Stadium: Terrain de Bécon; Referee: Mr. Daumay (Club Français)
Note: Replay final of the first recognized amateur football championship held in France.

6 April 1919 French Cup final	CASG Paris	3–2 (a.e.t.)	Olympique de Paris	Paris
	Devic 20'; Hatzfeld 110', 118'	Report	Darques 60'; Dewaquez 100'	Stadium: Parc des Princes; Attendance: 10,000; Referee: Armand Thibaudeau
Note: The first all-Paris final of the Coupe de France.

24 April 1921 French Cup final	Red Star	2–1	Olympique de Paris	Paris
	Clavel 53'; Naudin 77'	Report	Landauer 78'	Stadium: Stade Pershing; Attendance: 18,000; Referee: Marcel Slawik
Note: The second all-Paris final of the Coupe de France.

1 April 1928 French Cup semi-finals	Red Star	8–2	Stade Français	Paris
	O. Belin (o.g.); Martin (x2); Lund (x2); Brouzes; Nicolas (x2)	Report 1 Report 2	(x2)	Stadium: Stade Pershing; Attendance: 18,000
Note: One of the largest victories in the history of the Parisian derbies.

6 May 1928 French Cup final	Red Star	3–1	CA Paris	Colombes
	Wartel 8'; Lund 33'; Brouzes 61'	Report	Bertrand 45'	Stadium: Stade Yves-du-Manoir; Attendance: 30,000; Referee: Thomas Balvay
Note: The most recent all-Paris final of the Coupe de France to date.

11 November 1932 Division 1	Red Star	3–4	CA Paris	Saint-Ouen-sur-Seine
	Finamore 20' (pen.), 40'; Díaz 80'	Report	Colomb 30'; Rose 50', 55'; Guimbard 60'	Stadium: Stade Bauer; Attendance: 7,000; Referee: Louis Raguin
Note: The first Parisian derby in the professional era.

30 April 1933 Division 1	Club Français	5–5	Racing	Saint-Ouen-sur-Seine
	Mercier 6', 30', 40'; Laurent 20', 80'	Report	Galey 10' (pen.); Ozenne 50'; Berkessy 60'; Delesse 70', 86'	Stadium: Stade Bauer; Attendance: 3,000; Referee: Thomas Balvay
Note: One of the highest-scoring matches in the history of the Parisian derbies.

27 April 1946 French Cup semi-finals	Red Star	3–2	Stade Français	Fives, Nord
	Grillon 6' (o.g.); Bersoullé 33', 90'	Report	Mandaluniz 8'; Luciano 18'
Note: Semi-finals of the Coupe de France, with Red Star finishing as runners-up in the final.

6 March 1948 Division 1	Red Star	0–7	Stade Français	Saint-Ouen-sur-Seine
		Report	Nyers 3', 48'; Aston 5'; Ujlaki 33'; Simonyi 40', 49'; Benbarek 46'	Stadium: Stade Bauer; Attendance: 10,500; Referee: Jean Quaglia
Note: One of the largest victories in the history of the Parisian derbies.

6 June 1954 Relegation playoffs	Stade Français	1–2	Racing	Paris
	Baucomont 28'	Report	Courteaux 78'; Curyl 89'	Stadium: Parc des Princes; Attendance: 30,011; Referee: Jacques Devillers
Note: Racing won the relegation playoffs 4–3 on aggregate, earning promotion to Ligue 1 while relegating Stade Français to Ligue 2.

12 June 1954 Relegation playoffs	Racing	2–2 (4–3 agg.)	Stade Français	Colombes
	Cisowski 28'; Courteaux 64'	Report	Saupin 38'; Jönsson 83'	Stadium: Stade Yves-du-Manoir; Attendance: 24,917; Referee: Louis Fauquemberghe
Note: Racing won the relegation playoffs 4–3 on aggregate, earning promotion to Ligue 1 while relegating Stade Français to Ligue 2.

== Modern derbies ==
=== PSG vs. Paris FC ===
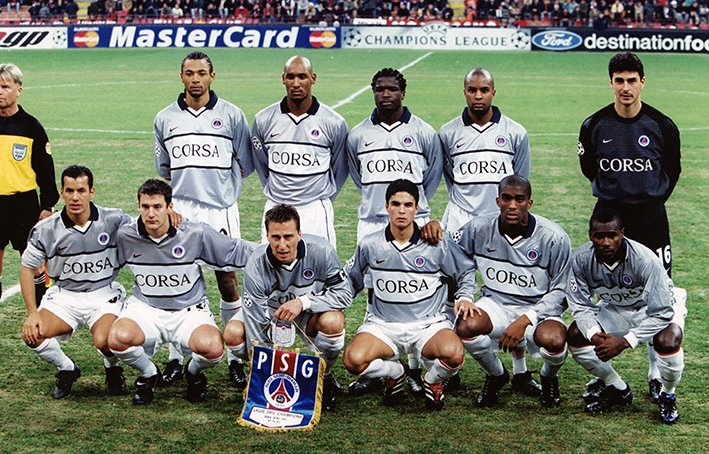
PSG, the dominant club in Paris, in 2001.

The Paris derby, also referred to as Derby de Paris, Derby de la Capitale, or Le Derby Parisien, is a French football rivalry contested between Paris Saint-Germain FC (PSG) and Paris FC (PFC), the two largest professional clubs based in Paris, France. PSG, founded in 1970 through the merger of Paris FC and Stade Saint-Germain, has grown into the dominant club in both the capital and French football, regularly competing in Ligue 1 and European competitions. Paris FC, which split from PSG in 1972, spent decades in the lower divisions before returning to the top flight in 2025, reigniting a local derby that had been dormant at the highest level for more than three decades.

The rivalry traces its roots to the early history of football in the French capital, where historic clubs like Racing Club de France Football and Red Star FC once competed. PSG emerged from efforts by the French Football Federation (FFF) to create a major inner‑city club in the late 1960s, while Paris FC originally remained in Ligue 1 following the 1972 split. PSG quickly established itself as the capital's leading club, taking over the Parc des Princes and embarking on a period of sustained success that left Paris FC largely absent from the top tier. Consequently, first‑team meetings between the two were rare for decades.

Following Paris FC's promotion to Ligue 1 in 2025, the Paris derby returned as a significant fixture in French football. The two clubs' home stadiums—PSG's Parc des Princes and PFC's Stade Jean-Bouin—are separated by only a short distance, creating one of the closest geographic derbies in world football. The first top‑flight meeting since 1990 took place on 4 January 2026 at the Parc des Princes, with PSG winning 2–1 in a closely contested match. A subsequent Coupe de France encounter saw Paris FC secure a 1–0 victory, marking PSG's first home defeat in the competition in several years.

=== PSG vs. Red Star ===
As of 3 May 1975.

Paris Saint-Germain Red Star Draw

Head-to-head

Competition	Matches	Wins		Draws	Goals		Goal difference	
Competition	Matches	PSG	Red Star	Draws	PSG	Red Star	PSG	Red Star
Ligue 1	4	2	0	2	7	2	+5	−5
Ligue 2	2	1	1	0	3	3	0	0
Division 3	2	1	1	0	5	4	+1	−1
Total	8	4	2	2	15	9	+6	−6

List of matches

13 October 1971 Division 1	Paris Saint-Germain	4–1	Red Star	Colombes
	Prost 6', 78'; Bras 12', 57'	Report	González 20'	Stadium: Stade Yves-du-Manoir; Attendance: 8,305; Referee: Robert Wurtz

26 March 1972 Division 1	Red Star	0–0	Paris Saint-Germain	Saint-Ouen-sur-Seine
		Report		Stadium: Stade Bauer; Attendance: 10,278; Referee: Georges Uhlen

12 November 1972 Division 3	Paris Saint-Germain	4–0	Red Star B	Saint-Germain-en-Laye
	André 10', 60', 85'; Renaut 47'	Report		Stadium: Stade Georges Lefèvre; Attendance: 612; Referee: Jean Muchembled

8 April 1973 Division 3	Red Star B	4–1	Paris Saint-Germain	Saint-Ouen-sur-Seine
	Ciani 5', 35'; González 9'; Simon 70'	Report	André 48'	Stadium: Stade Bauer; Attendance: 192; Referee: Mr. David

10 November 1973 Division 2	Paris Saint-Germain	3–1	Red Star	Paris
	Dossevi 15'; Monteiro 56'; Deloffre 75'	Report	Combin 67' (pen.)	Stadium: Parc des Princes; Attendance: 33,872; Referee: Henri Didier

20 April 1974 Division 2	Red Star	2–0	Paris Saint-Germain	Saint-Ouen-sur-Seine
	González 7'; Combin 10'	Report		Stadium: Stade Bauer; Attendance: 13,982; Referee: Stéphane Frère

24 November 1974 Division 1	Paris Saint-Germain	2–0	Red Star	Paris
	M'Pelé 12'; Dahleb 90'	Report		Stadium: Parc des Princes; Attendance: 28,324; Referee: Jean Bancourt

3 May 1975 Division 1	Red Star	1–1	Paris Saint-Germain	Saint-Ouen-sur-Seine
	Combin 15'	Report	M'Pelé 80' (pen.)	Stadium: Stade Bauer; Attendance: 7,000; Referee: Michel Kitabdjian

=== PSG vs. Racing ===
As of 25 February 1990.

Paris Saint-Germain Racing Draw

Head-to-head

Competition	Matches	Wins		Draws	Goals		Goal difference	
Competition	Matches	PSG	Racing	Draws	PSG	Racing	PSG	Racing
Ligue 1	10	4	3	3	14	12	+2	−2
Total	10	4	3	3	14	12	+2	−2

List of matches

2 November 1984 Division 1	Racing	0–1	Paris Saint-Germain	Paris
		Report	Sušić 74'	Stadium: Parc des Princes; Attendance: 35,000; Referee: Michel Vautrot

19 April 1985 Division 1	Paris Saint-Germain	2–2	Racing	Paris
	Renaut 29' (o.g.); Sušić 77'	Report	Renaut 28'; Ekéké 75'	Stadium: Parc des Princes; Attendance: 20,000; Referee: Michel De Zayas

13 September 1986 Division 1	Paris Saint-Germain	1–2	Racing	Paris
	Rocheteau 50'	Report	Francescoli 41', 86'	Stadium: Parc des Princes; Attendance: 32,254; Referee: Claude Bouillet

14 March 1987 Division 1	Racing	0–1	Paris Saint-Germain	Paris
		Report 1 Report 2	Fernandez 59' (o.g.)	Stadium: Parc des Princes; Attendance: 29,096; Referee: Gérard Biguet

2 October 1987 Division 1	Racing	2–1	Paris Saint-Germain	Paris
	Buscher 23'; Francescoli 69'	Report 1 Report 2	Jeannol 84'	Stadium: Parc des Princes; Attendance: 23,414; Referee: Jean-Claude Swirog

8 April 1988 Division 1	Paris Saint-Germain	1–1	Racing	Paris
	Sandjak 87'	Report	Krimau 60'	Stadium: Parc des Princes; Attendance: 13,486; Referee: Jean-Marie Lartigot

14 October 1988 Division 1	Racing	0–2	Paris Saint-Germain	Paris
		Report 1 Report 2	Xuereb 7'; Perez 81'	Stadium: Parc des Princes; Attendance: 24,208; Referee: Gérard Biguet

22 April 1989 Division 1	Paris Saint-Germain	2–1	Racing	Paris
	Xuereb 22'; Bossis 46' (o.g.)	Report 1 Report 2	Lima 89'	Stadium: Parc des Princes; Attendance: 17,973; Referee: Robert Wurtz

9 September 1989 Division 1	Racing	2–2	Paris Saint-Germain	Paris
	Lima 5'; Fernier 15'	Report 1 Report 2	Calderón 25' (pen.), 87' (pen.)	Stadium: Parc des Princes; Attendance: 25,000; Referee: Jean-Claude Swirog

25 February 1990 Division 1	Paris Saint-Germain	1–2	Racing	Paris
	Calderón 90' (pen.)	Report	Bouderbala 58', 83'	Stadium: Parc des Princes; Attendance: 17,847; Referee: Gérard Biguet

=== Racing vs. Paris FC ===
As of 27 March 2004.

Racing Paris FC Draw

Head-to-head

Competition	Matches	Wins		Draws	Goals		Goal difference	
Competition	Matches	Racing	PFC	Draws	Racing	PFC	Racing	PFC
Division 3	2	0	2	0	0	3	−3	+3
Ligue 3	6	3	2	1	9	5	+4	−4
Championnat National 1	2	0	1	1	0	1	−1	+1
Coupe de France	1	1	0	0	2	1	+1	−1
Total	11	4	5	2	11	10	+1	−1

List of matches

18 August 1990 Division 3	Paris FC	1–0	Racing	Paris
		Report		Stadium: Stade Déjerine

18 May 1991 Division 3	Racing	0–2	Paris FC	Poissy
		Report	Djadaoui 85'; Kanál 89'	Stadium: Stade Léo-Lagrange; Attendance: 230; Referee: Jacky Legrain

22 January 1994 Coupe de France	Racing	2–1	Paris FC	Poissy
	Hébreu 53', 56'	Report	Tchimbakala 15'	Stadium: Stade Léo-Lagrange; Attendance: 2,000; Referee: Jacky Legrain

10 October 1997 Ligue 3	Paris FC	2–1	Racing	Paris
				Stadium: Stade Déjerine

3 April 1998 Ligue 3	Racing	0–0	Paris FC	Poissy
				Stadium: Stade Léo-Lagrange

18 September 1998 Ligue 3	Racing	3–0	Paris FC	Poissy
	Lima 51'; Dagnogo 84'; Tabti 87'	Report		Stadium: Stade Léo-Lagrange; Attendance: 350; Referee: Serge Fidri

27 February 1999 Ligue 3	Paris FC	0–2	Racing	Paris
				Stadium: Stade Déjerine

4 December 1999 Ligue 3	Racing	1–0	Paris FC	Poissy
				Stadium: Stade Léo-Lagrange

13 May 2000 Ligue 3	Paris FC	3–2	Racing	Paris
				Stadium: Stade Déjerine

25 October 2003 National 1	Paris FC	1–0	Racing	Paris
	Ossey 82'	Report		Stadium: Stade Déjerine

27 March 2004 National 1	Racing	0–0	Paris FC	Colombes
		Report		Stadium: Stade Yves-du-Manoir; Referee: Jérôme Goulu

=== Paris FC vs. Red Star ===
As of 25 January 2025.

Paris FC Red Star Draw

Head-to-head

Competition	Matches	Wins		Draws	Goals		Goal difference	
Competition	Matches	PFC	Red Star	Draws	PFC	Red Star	PFC	Red Star
Ligue 1	2	2	0	0	6	2	+4	−4
Ligue 2	10	6	1	3	17	8	+9	−9
Ligue 3	10	1	6	3	4	13	−9	+9
Coupe de France	2	1	1	0	2	2	0	0
Coupe de la Ligue	1	0	0	1	1	1	0	0
Total	25	10	8	7	30	26	+4	−4

List of matches

4 October 1972 Division 1	Paris FC	3–0	Red Star	Paris
	Chapuisat 13'; Spiegler 33'; Prost 59'	Report		Stadium: Parc des Princes; Attendance: 15,198; Referee: Achille Verbecke

23 March 1973 Division 1	Red Star	2–3	Paris FC	Beauvais
	Pintenat 12'; Ameijenda 87'	Report	Floch 21', 63'; Eo 62'	Stadium: Stade Pierre Brisson; Attendance: 12,995; Referee: Henri Didier

10 September 1976 Division 2	Paris FC	1–0	Red Star	Paris
	Neumann 59'	Report		Stadium: Parc des Princes; Attendance: 20,205

29 January 1977 Division 2	Red Star	2–2	Paris FC	Saint-Ouen-sur-Seine
	Benouala 13'; Lecornu 43'	Report	Rabat 48'; Maas 78'	Stadium: Stade Bauer; Attendance: 1,557; Referee: Jean Bouteille

1 October 1977 Division 2	Paris FC	0–0	Red Star	Paris
		Report		Stadium: Parc des Princes; Attendance: 40,000; Referee: Marc Buils

4 March 1978 Division 2	Red Star	0–1	Paris FC	Saint-Ouen-sur-Seine
		Report 1 Report 2	Beltramini 40'	Stadium: Stade Bauer; Attendance: 5,820

15 November 1987 Coupe de France	Paris FC	2–1	Red Star	Paris
	Djaadaoui (x2)	Report	Clément	Stadium: Stade Déjerine

8 October 1999 Ligue 3	Red Star	1–0	Paris FC	La Courneuve
	Doukantié 89'	Report 1 Report 2		Stadium: Stade Marville; Attendance: 500

24 March 2000 Ligue 3	Paris FC	0–1	Red Star	Paris
		Report 1 Report 2	Oponga 65'	Stadium: Stade Déjerine

19 October 2002 Coupe de France	Red Star	1–0	Paris FC	Saint-Ouen-sur-Seine
	Lakrout 64'	Report 1 Report 2		Stadium: Stade Bauer; Attendance: 500; Referee: Bartolomeu Varela

15 September 2011 Ligue 3	Paris FC	0–4	Red Star	Paris
		Report 1 Report 2	Touati 16'; Malfleury 59', 70'; Beziouen 75'	Stadium: Stade Sébastien Charléty; Attendance: 1,218; Referee: Florent Batta

24 February 2012 Ligue 3	Red Star	0–0	Paris FC	Saint-Ouen-sur-Seine
		Report 1 Report 2		Stadium: Stade Bauer; Attendance: 1,848; Referee: Alexandre Perreau-Niel

18 September 2012 Ligue 3	Paris FC	0–0	Red Star	Paris
		Report 1 Report 2		Stadium: Stade Sébastien Charléty; Attendance: 504; Referee: Mickaël Leleu

1 March 2013 Ligue 3	Red Star	2–0	Paris FC	Saint-Ouen-sur-Seine
	Lafon 17'; Oudrhiri 90'	Report		Stadium: Stade Bauer; Attendance: 1,329; Referee: Stéphanie Frappart

23 August 2013 Ligue 3	Red Star	0–0	Paris FC	Saint-Ouen-sur-Seine
		Report		Stadium: Stade Bauer; Attendance: 1,921; Referee: Silas Billong

31 January 2014 Ligue 3	Paris FC	2–3	Red Star	Paris
	Toko Ekambi 32' (pen.); Traoré 74'	Report	Allegro 48'; Lee 68'; Laborde 76'	Stadium: Stade Déjerine; Attendance: 1,000; Referee: Dimitri Kristo

5 September 2014 Ligue 3	Paris FC	1–0	Red Star	Paris
	Kinkela 64' (pen.)	Report		Stadium: Stade Sébastien Charléty; Attendance: 2,132; Referee: Bastien Dechepy

14 February 2015 Ligue 3	Red Star	2–1	Paris FC	Saint-Ouen-sur-Seine
	Makhedjouf 68' (pen.); Kanté 78'	Report	Chevalier 59'	Stadium: Stade Bauer; Attendance: 2,977; Referee: Christian Guillard

7 November 2015 Ligue 2	Paris FC	0–1	Red Star	Paris
		Report	Ngamukol 86'	Stadium: Stade Sébastien Charléty; Attendance: 7,004; Referee: Thomas Léonard

4 April 2016 Ligue 2	Red Star	2–4	Paris FC	Beauvais
	Ngamukol 20'; Bouazza 63'	Report	Camara 5'; Bahamboula 37' (pen.), 76'; Grange 68'	Stadium: Stade Pierre Brisson; Attendance: 3,012; Referee: Olivier Thual

9 August 2016 Coupe de la Ligue	Paris FC	1–1 (a.e.t.) (5–3 p)	Red Star	Paris
18:30	Robail 15'	Report	Ngamukol 86'	Stadium: Stade Sébastien Charléty; Attendance: 2,006; Referee: Wilfried Bien
	Penalties
	Gbessi (penalty scored); Marie (penalty scored); Pierazzi (penalty scored); Massouema (penalty scored); Camara (penalty scored)		(penalty scored) Chavalerin; (penalty scored) Makhedjouf; (penalty scored) Bouazza; (penalty missed) Keita

21 December 2018 Ligue 2	Paris FC	1–1	Red Star	Paris
	Perraud 21'	Report	Fontaine 90'	Stadium: Stade Sébastien Charléty; Attendance: 8,002; Referee: Alexandre Perreau-Niel

10 May 2019 Ligue 2	Red Star	0–1	Paris FC	Saint-Ouen-sur-Seine
		Report	Silas 11'	Stadium: Stade Bauer; Attendance: 2,540; Referee: Sylvain Palhies

28 September 2024 Ligue 2	Red Star	1–3	Paris FC	Saint-Ouen-sur-Seine
	Doucouré 32'	Report	Camara 20'; Krasso 45+1' (pen.), 57'	Stadium: Stade Bauer; Attendance: 4,560; Referee: Mikael Lesage

25 January 2025 Ligue 2	Paris FC	4–1	Red Star	Paris
	Gory 8', 48', 78'; Doucet 90+2'	Report	Badji 85'	Stadium: Stade Sébastien Charléty; Attendance: 17,748; Referee: Olivier Thual

=== Red Star vs. Racing ===
As of 7 March 2009.

Red Star Racing Draw

Head-to-head

Competition	Matches	Wins		Draws	Goals		Goal difference	
Competition	Matches	Red Star	Racing	Draws	Red Star	Racing	Red Star	Racing
Ligue 1	14	2	10	2	17	31	−14	+14
Ligue 2	6	3	3	0	10	14	−4	+4
Division 3	2	1	1	0	4	2	+2	−2
Ligue 3	4	1	3	0	3	5	−2	+2
Championnat National 1	2	1	1	0	3	3	0	0
Régional 1	2	1	1	0	5	3	+2	−2
Coupe de France	5	2	1	2	6	7	−1	+1
Coupe Charles Drago	3	0	3	0	3	6	−3	+3
Total	38	11	23	4	51	71	−20	+20

List of matches

3 April 1921 Coupe de France	Red Star	4–3	Racing	Paris
	Brouzes; Nicolas (x2); Baumann (o.g.)	Report	Devic (x2); Triboulet	Stadium: Parc des Princes; Attendance: 10,000; Referee: Louis Raguin

23 September 1934 Division 1	Red Star	1–2	Racing	Saint-Ouen-sur-Seine
	Sas 10'	Report	Mercier 38', 46'	Stadium: Stade Bauer; Attendance: 16,000; Referee: Mr. Vandeputte

13 January 1935 Division 1	Racing	2–2	Red Star	Paris
	Kennedy 11'; Diagne 83'	Report	Aston 4', 43'	Stadium: Parc des Princes; Attendance: 7,000; Referee: Georges Capdeville

29 September 1935 Division 1	Red Star	1–4	Racing	Saint-Ouen-sur-Seine
	Sas 90' (pen.)	Report	Kennedy 17'; Veinante 31', 54'; Daumin 76' (o.g.)	Stadium: Stade Bauer; Attendance: 10,000; Referee: Mr. Vandeputte

22 March 1936 Division 1	Racing	4–1	Red Star	Colombes
	Bohé 61'; Kennedy 64', 83' (pen.); Ozenne 80'	Report	O'Neill 51'	Stadium: Stade Yves-du-Manoir; Attendance: 9,000; Referee: Jean Merckx

6 December 1936 Division 1	Racing	4–2	Red Star	Paris
	Couard 6', 88'; Ozenne 19'; Mathé 34'	Report	Simonyi 32'; Laporte 89'	Stadium: Parc des Princes; Attendance: 20,000; Referee: Eugène Olive

6 May 1937 Division 1	Red Star	2–0	Racing	Saint-Ouen-sur-Seine
	Simonyi 3'; Cros 35'	Report		Stadium: Stade Bauer; Attendance: 14,000; Referee: Georges Bouture

21 November 1937 Division 1	Red Star	2–2	Racing	Saint-Ouen-sur-Seine
	Keenan 41'; Banide 44'	Report	Simonyi 54'; Diagne 78'	Stadium: Stade Bauer; Attendance: 15,000; Referee: Georges Capdeville

23 April 1938 Division 1	Racing	2–1	Red Star	Paris
	Veinante 34'; Mathé 75'	Report	Simonyi 64'	Stadium: Parc des Princes; Attendance: 9,000; Referee: Jean Merckx

2 February 1941 Coupe de France	Racing	0–0	Red Star	Paris
		Report		Stadium: Parc des Princes

16 February 1941 Coupe de France	Red Star	1–0 (a.e.t.)	Racing	Saint-Ouen-sur-Seine
		Report		Stadium: Stade Bauer

30 September 1945 Division 1	Red Star	0–1	Racing	Saint-Ouen-sur-Seine
		Report		Stadium: Stade Bauer

24 February 1946 Division 1	Racing	1–0	Red Star	Paris
		Report		Stadium: Parc des Princes

22 September 1946 Division 1	Racing	1–2	Red Star	Paris
	Vaast 89'	Report	Aston 14'; Voisambert 75'	Stadium: Parc des Princes; Attendance: 27,059; Referee: Charles Tibaldi

9 March 1947 Division 1	Red Star	1–3	Racing	Saint-Ouen-sur-Seine
	Proust 7'	Report	Moreel 39'; Gabet 41', 88'	Stadium: Stade Bauer; Attendance: 15,000; Referee: Charles Tibaldi

31 August 1947 Division 1	Red Star	1–3	Racing	Saint-Ouen-sur-Seine
	Favre 42'	Report	Vaast 30'; Moreel 35'; Persini 85'	Stadium: Stade Bauer; Attendance: 14,700; Referee: Marcel Le Foll

11 January 1948 Division 1	Racing	2–1	Red Star	Paris
	Moreel 23'; Vaast 73'	Report	Lozia 23'	Stadium: Parc des Princes; Attendance: 15,438; Referee: Charles Tibaldi

29 April 1953 Charles Drago	Red Star	1–2 (a.e.t.)	Racing	Saint-Ouen-sur-Seine
	Pasik 45'	Report	Bruey 68'; Schaap 113'	Stadium: Stade Bauer; Attendance: 1,267; Referee: Maurice Bondon

22 November 1953 Division 2	Red Star	3–6	Racing	Saint-Ouen-sur-Seine
	Lehtovirta 7'; Dubreucq 38' (o.g.); Quenolle 89'	Report	Cisowski 17', 19', 89'; Courteaux 33', 40'; Rossi 43' (o.g.)	Stadium: Stade Bauer; Attendance: 16,590; Referee: Louis Fauquemberghe

2 March 1954 Division 2	Racing	0–1	Red Star	Paris
		Report	Lehtovirta 17'	Stadium: Parc des Princes; Attendance: 7,232; Referee: Jacques Devillers

5 April 1958 Charles Drago	Red Star	1–2	Racing	Saint-Ouen-sur-Seine
	Koza 53'	Report	Guillot 4' (pen.), 44'	Stadium: Stade Bauer; Attendance: 4,322; Referee: Henri Faucheux

10 October 1964 Division 2	Red Star	2–1	Racing	Saint-Ouen-sur-Seine
	Oriot 3'; Groschulski 54' (pen.)	Report	Van Sam 82'	Stadium: Stade Bauer; Attendance: 8,411; Referee: Louis Dhumerelle

11 February 1965 Charles Drago	Racing	2–1	Red Star	Paris
	Maravić 47'; Van Sam 64'	Report	Groschulski 15'	Stadium: Parc des Princes; Attendance: 1,748; Referee: Jérôme Morello

14 March 1965 Division 2	Racing	2–1	Red Star	Paris
	Lagadec 9', 12'	Report	Groschulski 20'	Stadium: Parc des Princes; Attendance: 7,591; Referee: Maurice Bondon

29 August 1981 Division 3	Racing	1–0	Red Star	Colombes
		Report		Stadium: Stade Yves-du-Manoir

9 January 1982 Division 3	Red Star	4–1	Racing	Saint-Ouen-sur-Seine
		Report		Stadium: Stade Bauer

20 August 1983 Division 2	Racing	1–2	Red Star	Colombes
	Madjer 70'	Report	Bridier 26'; Aniol 77'	Stadium: Stade Yves-du-Manoir; Attendance: 3,200; Referee: Jean-Claude Bourgeois

10 December 1983 Division 2	Red Star	1–4	Racing	Saint-Ouen-sur-Seine
	Kutermak 50'	Report	Ekéké 19'; Madjer 44' (pen.); Tihy 65', 86'	Stadium: Stade Bauer; Attendance: 3,428; Referee: Rémy Féménia

8 March 1985 Coupe de France	Racing	3–0	Red Star	Paris
	Økland 57', 60'; Madjer 85'	Report		Stadium: Parc des Princes; Attendance: 2,500; Referee: Jean-Claude Swirog

13 March 1985 Coupe de France	Red Star	1–1	Racing	Saint-Ouen-sur-Seine
	Séguy 35'	Report	Bridier 89'	Stadium: Stade Bauer; Attendance: 2,500

12 October 1999 Ligue 3	Racing	1–0	Red Star	Colombes
	Van Kets 22'	Report		Stadium: Stade Yves-du-Manoir; Attendance: 500

28 March 2000 Ligue 3	Red Star	2–1	Racing	Saint-Denis
	Akiana 14', 85'	Report	Lipka 30'	Stadium: Stade de France; Attendance: 25,000; Referee: Philippe Chat

22 December 2000 Ligue 3	Red Star	1–2	Racing	La Courneuve
	Van Kets 12'	Report	Đukanović 27'; Zaaboub 37'	Stadium: Stade Marville; Attendance: 400; Referee: Bertrand Auvinet

11 May 2001 Ligue 3	Racing	1–0	Red Star	Colombes
	Đukanović 35'	Report		Stadium: Stade Yves-du-Manoir; Attendance: 150; Referee: Alexandre Castro

23 November 2003 Régional 1	Racing	3–2	Red Star	Colombes
	Jacquet 19', 80'; Izquierdo 44' (pen.)	Report	Latt-Agnes 74'; N'Simba 76'	Stadium: Stade Lucien Choine; Attendance: 250; Referee: Mr. Rosio

28 March 2004 Régional 1	Red Star	3–0	Racing	Saint-Ouen-sur-Seine
	Gueï 8'; Yessad 42'; Hammami 68'	Report		Stadium: Stade Bauer; Attendance: 400; Referee: Melle Frappart

13 September 2008 National 1	Red Star	3–1	Racing	Saint-Ouen-sur-Seine
	Diagouraga 6'; Ongmakon 27'; Yosri 86'	Report	Malcuit 90+3'	Stadium: Stade Bauer; Attendance: 850; Referee: Hamid Guenaoui

7 March 2009 National 1	Racing	2–0	Red Star	Colombes
	Daboussi 39'; Malcuit 68'	Report		Stadium: Stade Lucien Choine; Attendance: 600; Referee: Ludovic Willems

== Women's football ==
=== From Fémina to Juvisy ===
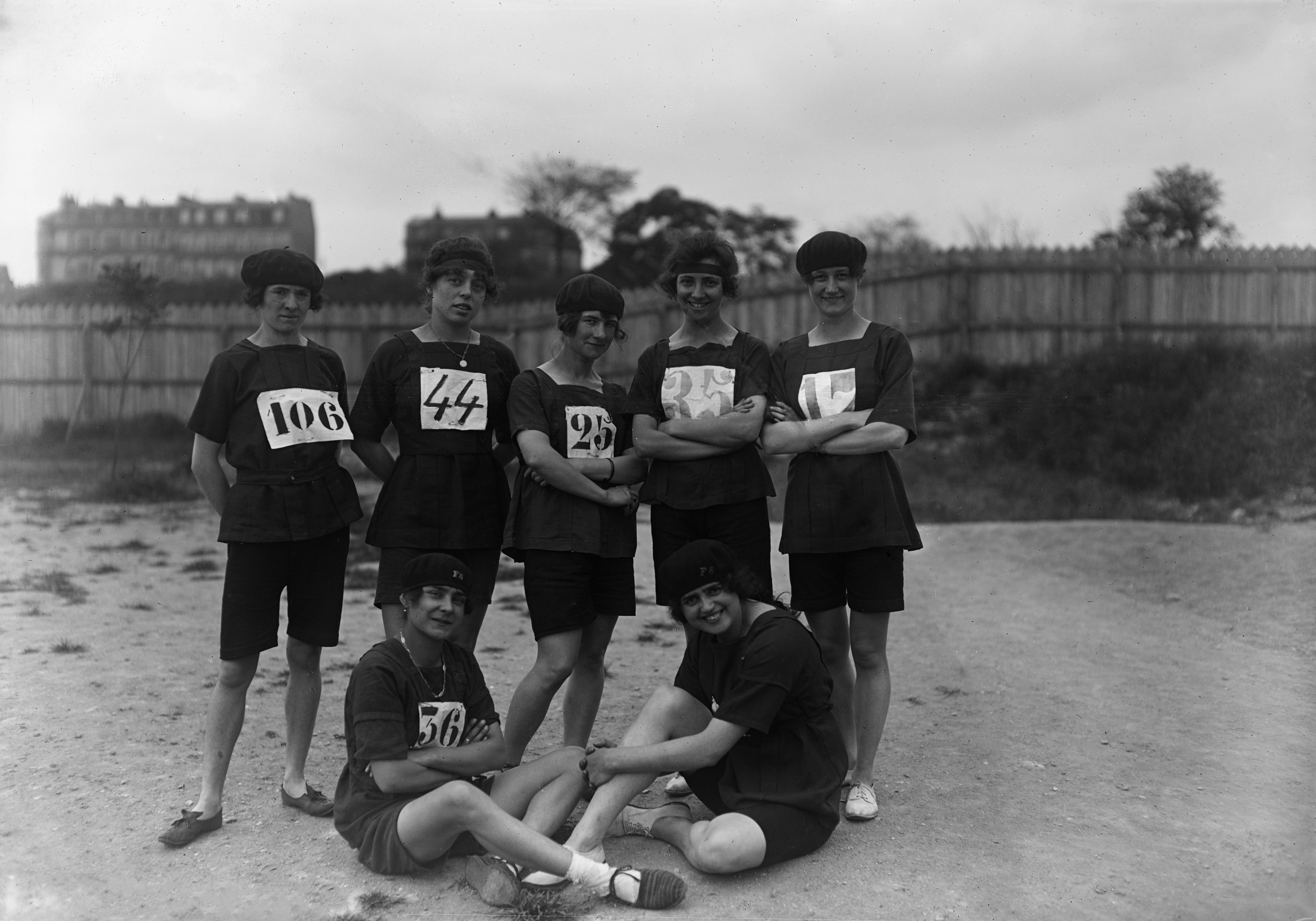
Fémina Sport, the first club in Paris, in 1920.

French women's football emerged in the Paris region around the time of World War I. The first club, Fémina Sport, was founded in 1912 by two physical education teachers. In 1917, the Fédération des sociétés féminines sportives de France (FSFSF) was established, and the first women's match in France took place between two Fémina Sport teams. In 1919, the French Football Federation (FFF) declared that it would not admit women, though it did not immediately ban the sport. In response, the FSFSF organized the first French women's football championship that same year. It was won by Fémina Sport, who defeated En Avant Paris in a two-legged tie. The championship remained largely centered in Paris, which counted 18 teams in 1923, and every edition was won by Parisian clubs: Fémina Sport claimed eleven titles, En Avant won two, and Les Sportives de Paris secured one.

The FSFSF continued to oversee women's football until 1933, when the FFF instituted a ban on the sport, fueled by widespread criticism that it was not suitable for women. Deemed by doctors to be violent, unhealthy, and dangerous, women's football disappeared by the eve of World War II. A Paris League was subsequently created, organizing a championship composed solely of clubs from the capital, but it folded in 1937. Women's football reemerged at the end of the 1960s, and the FFF lifted its ban in 1970. Four years later, in 1974, the French women's championship was relaunched under the auspices of the FFF.

During the first official French championship in the 1974–75 season, VGA Saint-Maur represented the Paris region in the competition. The Val-de-Marne club dominated regional and national football in the 1980s, winning six league titles between 1983 and 1990. At the turn of the 1990s, the main rivalry in the Paris region was between VGA and ES Juvisy. The Essonne side was eliminated twice in succession by VGA in the championship semi-finals, in 1990 and 1991. Renamed FCF Juvisy, and having signed several VGA players, they finally secured the title the following season, going on to win six national titles between 1992 and 2006.

=== Paris and Essonne derbies ===
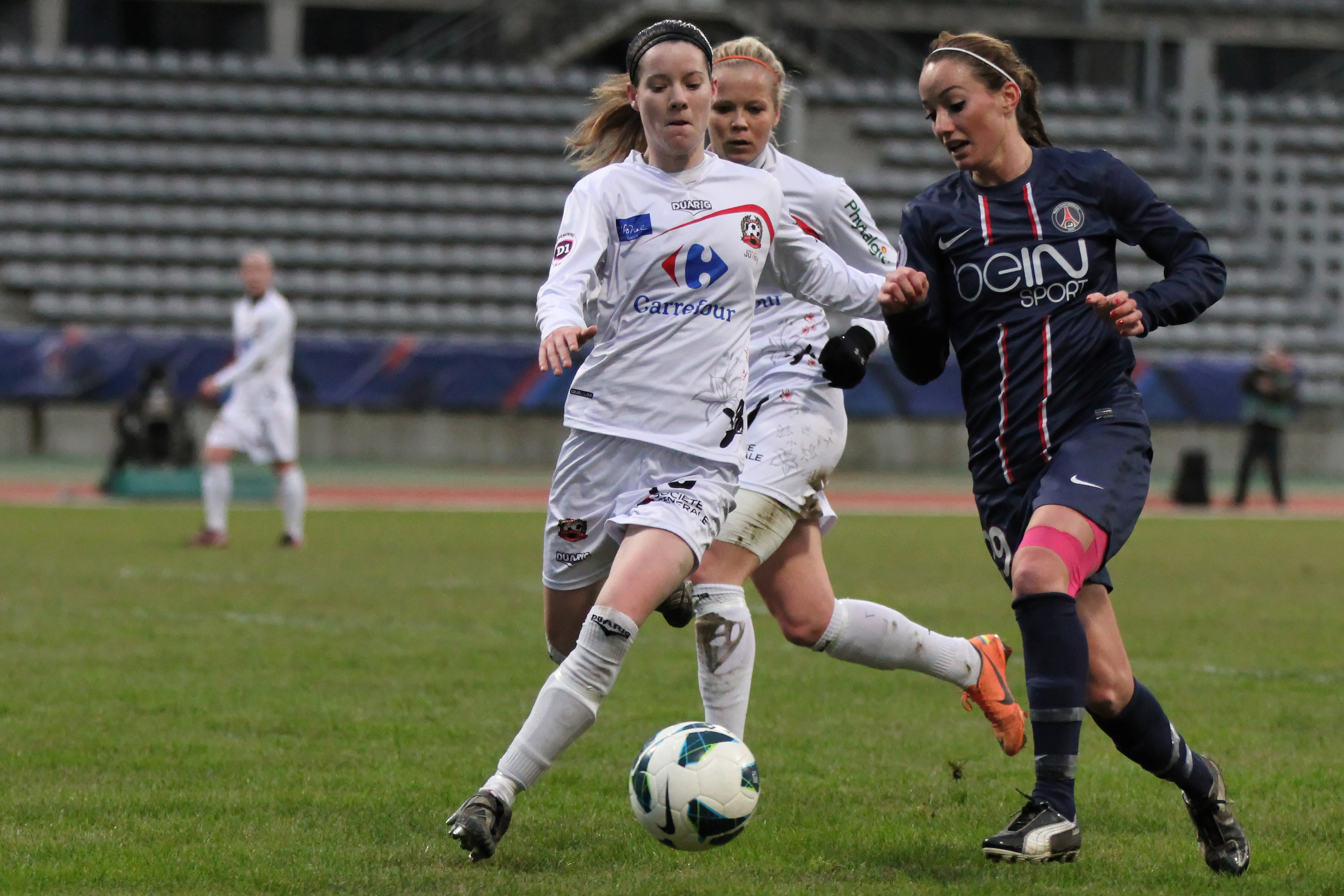
League match between PSG and Paris FC in 2012.

The Paris derby (women), also referred to as Le Derby Francilien, is a French football rivalry contested between Paris Saint-Germain FC (women) (PSG) and Paris FC (women) (PFC), the two largest professional women's clubs based in Paris, France. Both PFC (formerly Juvisy) and PSG were founded in 1971, making them among the oldest clubs in French women's football.

During the 1990s and 2000s, Juvisy established itself as the dominant Parisian side, regularly competing for national championships alongside OL Lyonnes and benefiting from consistent support from the Essonne departmental council. PSG, in contrast, remained a mid-table club for much of this period, undergoing a squad overhaul in 2005 to promote young talent and restructure the team. Juvisy's sustained strength was highlighted by decisive victories over PSG, illustrating the club's superior resources and squad depth.

PSG gradually closed the gap after 2009, strengthened by key signings and the 2012 takeover by Qatar Sports Investments (QSI), which bolstered the squad and allowed the club to challenge Lyon and assert dominance in the Paris derby. Juvisy's absorption into Paris FC in 2017 created a new dynamic, with PFC seeking to compete with the top teams despite initial difficulties. Throughout the 2010s, PSG largely dominated the derby, while Paris FC emerged as a third force in French women's football during the 2020s.

Paris FC also maintains a rivalry with Fleury, with whom it contests the Essonne derby. Although now based in the capital, as the successor to Juvisy, PFC was originally located in Essonne, like Fleury. In 2017, while Fleury attempted to convince Juvisy to merge with the club, the Juvisy side instead aligned itself with PFC. Until 2022, however, the team continued to play its matches at the Stade Robert Bobin, where it was given priority over Fleury, creating tensions between the two clubs. The allocation of subsidies by the Essonne department was also a source of friction, as in 2017 it distributed around €236,000 to Juvisy, compared to only €15,000 to neighbouring Fleury. From the 2021–22 season onwards, the two teams competed for third place and qualification to the UEFA Women's Champions League. In September 2022, the derby escalated, and Fleury finished the match with nine players.

== Most women's titles ==
As of 2025–26 season.

Club	Domestic titles					European titles		Worldwide titles		Total	Last title	Source		
Club	PL	FSFSF	CdF	CdL	TdC	UCL	UEC	FCWC	FCC	Total	Last title	Source		
Fémina Sport	PL	FSFSF	CdF	CdL	TdC	UCL	UEC	FCWC	FCC		11		11	1932
Paris FC	6		2							8	2025			
VGA Saint-Maur	6									6	1990			
Paris Saint-Germain	1		4							5	2024			
En Avant		2								2	1921			
Les Sportives de Paris		1								1	1922			
