= 1936–37 French Division 1 =

5th season of French Division 1

Division Nationale
- Season: 1936–37

Olympique de Marseille won Division 1 season 1936/1937 of the French Association Football League with 38 points.

== Participating teams ==
- FC Antibes
- AS Cannes
- SC Fives
- Olympique Lillois
- Olympique de Marseille
- FC Metz
- FC Mulhouse
- RC Paris
- Red Star Olympique
- Stade Rennais UC
- Excelsior AC Roubaix
- RC Roubaix
- FC Rouen
- FC Sète
- FC Sochaux-Montbéliard
- RC Strasbourg
Location of teams in 1936–37 Division 1

== Final table ==
Pos	Team	Pld	W	D	L	GF	GA	GAv	Pts	Qualification or relegation
1	Marseille (C)	30	17	4	9	69	39	1.769	38	
2	Sochaux	30	16	6	8	56	42	1.333	38	
3	Racing Paris	30	17	3	10	57	47	1.213	37	
4	Rouen	30	15	5	10	62	48	1.292	35	
5	Lillois	30	14	6	10	51	43	1.186	34	
6	Strasbourg	30	12	9	9	62	39	1.590	33	
7	Metz	30	13	6	11	60	61	0.984	32	
8	Excelsior	30	13	5	12	72	60	1.200	31	
9	Red Star	30	12	7	11	47	58	0.810	31	
10	Sète	30	11	8	11	46	48	0.958	30	
11	Fives	30	12	4	14	54	45	1.200	28	
12	Roubaix	30	11	5	14	50	61	0.820	27	
13	Antibes	30	11	4	15	50	64	0.781	26	
14	Cannes	30	8	9	13	48	55	0.873	25	
15	Rennes (R)	30	8	4	18	38	58	0.655	20	Relegation to French Division 2
16	Mulhouse (R)	30	6	3	21	48	102	0.471	15	Relegation to French Division 2

Rules for classification: Victory: 2 points, Draw: 1 point, Defeat: 0 points
(C) Champions; (R) Relegated

Promoted from Division 2, who will play in Division 1 season 1937/1938:

- RC Lens: Champion of Division 2
- US Valenciennes-Anzin: Runner-up Division 2

== Results ==
Home \ Away	FCA	CAN	EAR	SCF	LIL	OM	MET	MUL	RCP	RSO	REN	RCR	ROU	SÈT	SOC	RCS
Antibes		4–1	3–0	5–2	2–2	1–3	2–2	3–2	1–3	2–0	1–0	2–3	1–1	2–1	1–3	1–6
Cannes	2–3		1–4	0–0	0–2	3–0	5–1	6–4	1–2	0–2	1–2	0–0	4–1	2–2	2–1	0–0
Excelsior Roubaix	1–2	5–0		4–1	0–1	0–3	2–2	5–1	4–2	2–2	3–1	3–2	0–0	3–1	1–0	3–3
Fives	1–1	1–2	6–2		1–0	4–3	6–0	3–0	1–3	1–2	5–1	3–2	2–1	3–2	0–1	2–0
Olympique Lillois	3–2	4–3	5–4	1–3		2–1	5–0	1–1	1–0	0–0	3–1	2–3	3–3	2–0	2–1	1–2
Marseille	2–0	2–0	4–4	1–0	2–1		4–0	5–1	4–1	3–2	3–0	4–1	3–0	2–1	0–1	4–0
Metz	1–0	3–1	2–1	1–3	2–1	3–1		8–1	3–1	4–0	2–1	4–0	4–4	4–0	2–2	0–0
Mulhouse	2–3	1–1	1–4	1–0	1–3	1–3	2–4		0–2	1–3	5–2	2–1	3–2	1–1	4–1	1–9
Racing Paris	2–1	2–1	3–6	3–2	3–0	1–1	2–0	4–1		4–2	3–1	2–0	2–4	4–1	1–0	2–2
Red Star Olympique	3–1	3–3	3–2	0–0	2–1	0–5	2–1	3–2	2–0		0–1	2–2	0–1	1–0	2–2	1–1
Rennes	0–1	0–2	5–4	1–0	0–0	3–1	5–1	1–2	1–3	1–3		1–1	0–1	3–1	1–1	2–1
Racing Roubaix	5–3	2–1	0–2	2–1	0–1	2–2	1–2	4–1	2–0	2–3	4–3		3–0	1–1	3–2	2–1
Rouen	5–1	2–2	2–1	2–1	0–2	1–0	3–2	4–2	0–1	7–1	1–0	4–0		5–0	6–1	2–1
Sète	4–0	0–0	2–0	2–1	3–0	2–2	3–0	4–1	3–0	2–1	1–1	2–1	2–0		1–1	1–0
Sochaux	2–0	1–1	2–1	1–0	1–1	3–1	2–1	5–1	2–1	4–2	1–0	2–0	2–0	6–2		3–2
Strasbourg	2–1	1–3	0–1	1–1	2–1	1–0	1–1	7–2	0–0	3–0	3–0	5–1	4–0	1–1	3–2	

Legend: Blue = home team win; Yellow = draw; Red = away team win.

== Top goalscorers ==
Rank	Player	Club	Goals
1	(Germany) Oskar Rohr	Strasbourg	30
2	(France) Mario Zatelli	Marseille	28
3	(France) Jean Nicolas	Rouen	27
4	(France) René Couard	Racing Paris	22
4	(France) (Austria) Henri Hiltl	Excelsior Roubaix	22
6	(France) (Hungary) Désiré Koranyi	Sète	18
6	(France) Fernand Planquès	Antibes	18
8	(France) Jules Bigot	Olympique Lillois	17
9	(France) Roger Courtois	Sochaux	16
9	(France) Antoine Franceschetti	Cannes	16
9	(Hungary) André Simonyi	Red Star	16
