= 1934–35 French Division 1 =

3rd season of French Division 1

Division Nationale
- Season: 1934–35

FC Sochaux-Montbéliard won Division 1 season 1934/1935 of the French Association Football League with 48 points.

== Participating teams ==
- Olympique Alès
- FC Antibes
- AS Cannes
- SC Fives
- Olympique Lillois
- Olympique de Marseille
- SO Montpellier
- FC Mulhouse
- SC Nîmes
- RC Paris
- Red Star Olympique
- Stade Rennais UC
- Excelsior AC Roubaix
- FC Sète
- FC Sochaux-Montbéliard
- RC Strasbourg
Location of teams in 1934–35 Division 1

== Final table ==
Pos	Team	Pld	W	D	L	GF	GA	GAv	Pts	Qualification or relegation
1	Sochaux (C)	30	22	4	4	94	36	2.611	48	
2	Strasbourg	30	21	5	4	73	33	2.212	47	
3	Racing Paris	30	16	5	9	77	57	1.351	37	
4	Sète	30	13	10	7	52	45	1.156	36	
5	Cannes	30	14	5	11	62	48	1.292	33	
6	Mulhouse	30	14	5	11	66	67	0.985	33	
7	Lillois	30	14	3	13	56	46	1.217	31	
8	Excelsior	30	13	5	12	51	48	1.063	31	
9	Marseille	30	13	5	12	76	72	1.056	31	
10	Rennes	30	11	5	14	57	49	1.163	27	
11	Fives	30	12	1	17	45	61	0.738	25	
12	Red Star	30	8	7	15	58	72	0.806	23	
13	Alès	30	10	3	17	52	73	0.712	23	
14	Antibes	30	8	7	15	49	80	0.613	23	
15	Montpellier (R)	30	7	3	20	37	86	0.430	17	Relegation to French Division 2
16	Nîmes (R)	30	5	5	20	35	67	0.522	15	Relegation to French Division 2

Rules for classification: Victory: 2 points, Draw: 1 point, Defeat: 0 points
(C) Champions; (R) Relegated

Promoted from Division 2, who will play in Division 1 season 1935/1936:

- FC Metz: Champion of Division 2
- US Valenciennes-Anzin: Runner-up Division 2

== Results ==
Home \ Away	ALÈ	FCA	CAN	EAR	SCF	LIL	OM	SOM	MUL	NMS	RCP	RSO	REN	SÈT	SOC	RCS
Alès		2–1	5–1	0–3	2–1	3–1	1–0	1–1	2–2	2–4	7–2	3–2	3–2	3–0	0–5	1–5
Antibes	1–0		1–1	4–2	2–3	1–0	1–7	4–0	1–1	4–1	2–5	1–1	0–0	1–0	1–1	1–3
Cannes	6–2	3–1		5–2	2–0	1–2	3–0	7–2	5–0	1–0	0–2	6–2	3–0	2–0	0–2	0–1
Excelsior Roubaix	2–0	1–4	2–0		0–1	2–1	0–3	6–1	1–2	4–0	5–3	2–0	0–0	0–1	0–1	1–2
Fives	1–0	2–1	1–2	0–0		2–1	6–3	1–0	0–2	3–1	2–1	6–0	4–1	1–2	0–3	1–3
Olympique Lillois	2–1	10–0	0–0	4–0	3–0		5–0	4–1	0–1	3–1	0–0	0–4	3–1	2–0	2–1	2–1
Marseille	3–2	7–2	2–2	2–4	5–1	3–1		4–1	8–3	2–1	3–2	4–3	4–1	1–1	1–3	1–1
Montpellier	0–3	2–0	2–3	0–2	2–0	1–3	3–2		5–3	0–3	3–3	0–3	4–1	0–2	0–4	0–0
Mulhouse	2–0	4–1	4–0	6–1	1–0	1–0	3–4	4–1		6–0	3–1	0–0	2–2	1–1	1–5	4–1
SC Nîmes	1–1	3–1	1–2	1–1	1–4	1–2	1–1	4–5	3–2		0–2	2–1	1–2	1–3	0–2	0–1
Racing Paris	6–1	5–3	3–2	3–1	7–0	3–0	5–1	1–0	2–3	2–0		2–2	2–1	6–2	1–2	2–2
Red Star Olympique	3–1	2–2	2–1	1–3	5–2	1–1	4–1	0–1	3–1	2–2	1–2		2–1	3–4	2–7	1–3
Rennes	6–0	4–1	3–0	0–1	3–1	4–0	1–1	4–1	6–2	2–0	0–1	3–1		4–1	3–3	0–2
Sète	1–0	1–1	1–1	2–2	4–0	3–1	6–3	3–0	2–0	2–2	2–2	2–2	2–0		1–1	1–0
Sochaux	6–2	3–7	4–2	0–2	2–1	5–2	4–0	9–0	8–0	1–0	3–1	4–3	2–1	0–0		2–3
Strasbourg	3–2	6–1	1–1	1–1	2–1	4–1	1–0	2–1	4–2	3–0	6–0	5–2	2–1	5–2	0–1	

Legend: Blue = home team win; Yellow = draw; Red = away team win.

== Top goalscorers ==
Rank	Player	Club	Goals
1	(Switzerland) André Abegglen	Sochaux	30
2	(France) (Switzerland) Roger Courtois	Sochaux	29
3	(Austria) Franz Weselik	Mulhouse	24
4	(France) Joseph Alcazar	Marseille	22
4	(France) Jean Sécember	Excelsior Roubaix	22
6	(France) Robert Mercier	Racing Paris	21
6	(France) Fritz Keller	Strasbourg	21
8	(Germany) Oskar Rohr	Strasbourg	20
9	(France) André Simonyi	Olympique Lillois	18
10	(France) André Guimbard	Cannes	17
