= List of French women's football champions =

The French women's football champions are the winners of the highest league of football in France for women, the Première Ligue. Since the creation of the women's first division by the French Football Federation in 1975, the women's football championship of France has been contested through the Première Ligue. Prior to this, the first division championship of French women's football was contested through a league ran by the Fédération des Sociétés Féminines Sportives de France (FSFSF), a women's football organization in France that was led by women's football pioneer Alice Milliat. The FSFSF's league ran from 1918 to 1932 and awarded 14 league titles before being disbanded due to the prohibition of women's football.

== FSFSF Championship (1918–1932) ==
- 1919 Fémina Sport Paris (1)
- 1920 En Avant Paris (1)
- 1921 En Avant Paris (2)
- 1922 Les Sportives de Paris (1)
- 1923 Fémina Sport Paris (2)
- 1924 Fémina Sport Paris (3)
- 1925 Fémina Sport Paris (4)
- 1926 Fémina Sport Paris (5)
- 1927 Fémina Sport Paris (6)
- 1928 Fémina Sport Paris (7)
- 1929 Fémina Sport Paris (8)
- 1930 Fémina Sport Paris (9)
- 1931 Fémina Sport Paris (10)
- 1932 Fémina Sport Paris (11)

=== FSFSF championship results by team ===
Club	Wins	First Title	Last Title
Fémina Sport Paris	11	1919	1932
En Avant Paris	2	1920	1921
Les Sportives de Paris	1	1922	1922

== FFF Championship (from 1974–75) ==
From 1975 to 1992 there were regional tables leading to playoffs for the championship. The championship became a single league for the 1992/93 season.

- 1975 Stade de Reims (1)
- 1976 Stade de Reims (2)
- 1977 Stade de Reims (3)
- 1978 AS Etroeungt (1)
- 1979 AS Etroeungt (2)
- 1980 Stade de Reims (4)
- 1981 AS Etroeungt (3)
- 1982 Stade de Reims (5)
- 1983 VGA Saint-Maur (1)
- 1984 ASJ Soyaux (1)
- 1985 VGA Saint-Maur (2)
- 1986 VGA Saint-Maur (3)
- 1987 VGA Saint-Maur (4)
- 1988 VGA Saint-Maur (5)
- 1989 CS Saint-Brieuc (1)
- 1990 VGA Saint-Maur (6)
- 1991 FC Lyon (1)
- 1992 FCF Juvisy (1)
- 1993 FC Lyon (2)
- 1994 FCF Juvisy (2)
- 1995 FC Lyon (3)
- 1996 FCF Juvisy (3)
- 1997 FCF Juvisy (4)
- 1998 FC Lyon (4)
- 1999 Toulouse OAC (1)
- 2000 Toulouse OAC (2)
- 2001 Toulouse OAC (3)
- 2002 Toulouse FC (4)
- 2003 FCF Juvisy (5)
- 2004 Montpellier HSC (1)
- 2005 Montpellier HSC (2)
- 2006 FCF Juvisy (6)
- 2007 Olympique Lyonnais (1)
- 2008 Olympique Lyonnais (2)
- 2009 Olympique Lyonnais (3)
- 2010 Olympique Lyonnais (4)
- 2011 Olympique Lyonnais (5)
- 2012 Olympique Lyonnais (6)
- 2013 Olympique Lyonnais (7)
- 2014 Olympique Lyonnais (8)
- 2015 Olympique Lyonnais (9)
- 2016 Olympique Lyonnais (10)
- 2017 Olympique Lyonnais (11)
- 2018 Olympique Lyonnais (12)
- 2019 Olympique Lyonnais (13)
- 2020 Olympique Lyonnais (14)
- 2021 Paris Saint-Germain (1)
- 2022 Olympique Lyonnais (15)
- 2023 Olympique Lyonnais (16)
- 2024 Olympique Lyonnais (17)
- 2025 Olympique Lyonnais (18)
- 2026 OL Lyonnes (19)

== FFF championship results by team ==
Club	Wins	First title	Last title
Olympique Lyonnais / OL Lyonnes	19	2007	2026
VGA Saint-Maur	6	1983	1990
FCF Juvisy / Paris FC	6	1992	2006
Stade Reims	5	1975	1982
Toulouse OAC / Toulouse FC	4	1999	2002
FC Lyon	4	1991	1998
AS Etroeungt	3	1978	1981
Montpellier HSC	2	2004	2005
ASJ Soyaux	1	1984	1984
CS Saint-Brieuc / EA Guingamp	1	1989	1989
Paris Saint-Germain	1	2021	2021
