= Women's football in France =

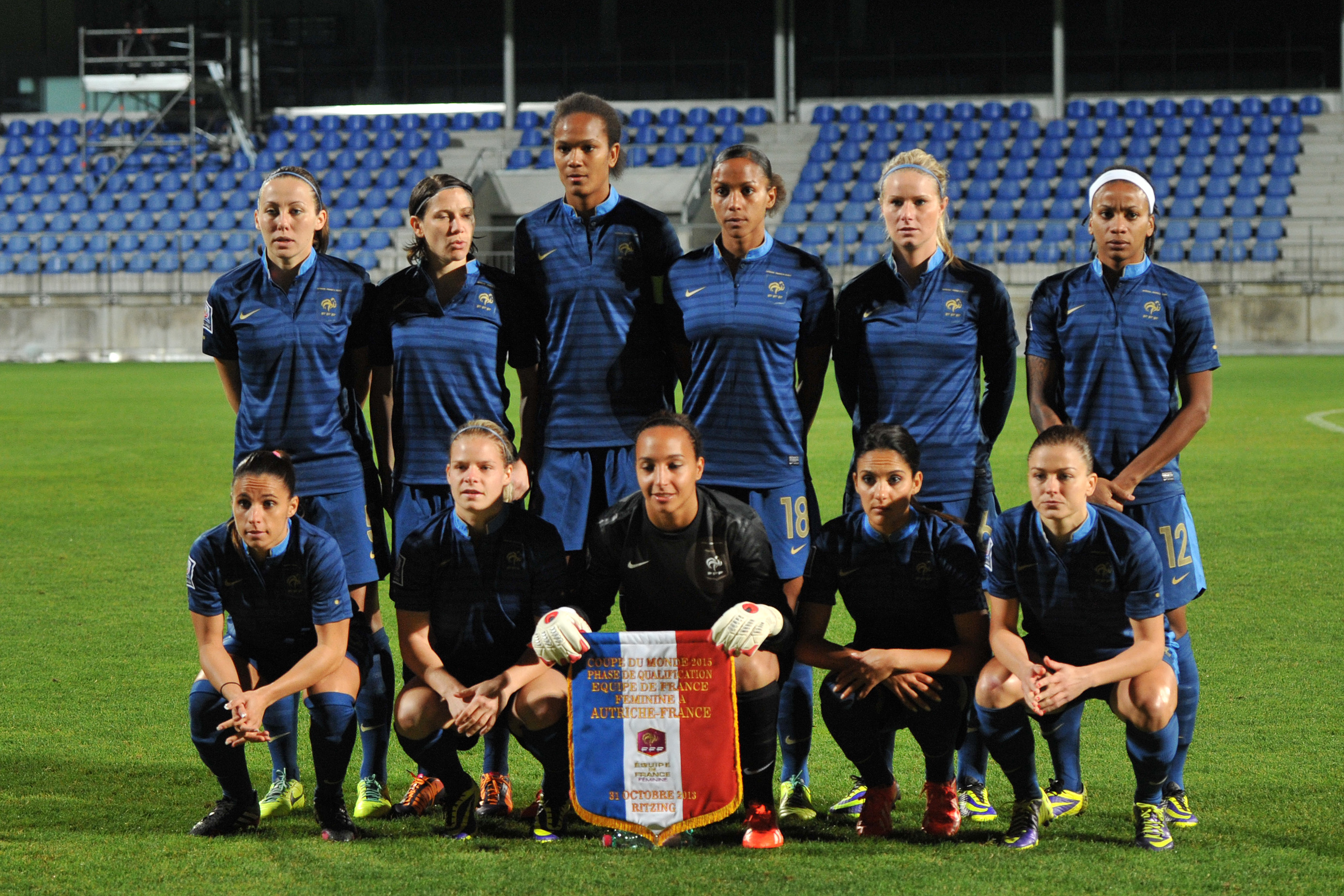
- France lineup ahead of a 2015 FIFA Women's World Cup qualification match against Austria
- Country: France
- Governing body: French Football Federation
- National team: Women's national team

National competitions
- Coupe de France Féminine; Trophée des Championnes

Club competitions
- Première Ligue; Seconde Ligue; Division 3 Féminine

International competitions
- Champions League; FIFA Women's World Cup (National Team); European Championship (National Team); Olympics (National Team)

Women's football in France is run by the French Football Federation. As such the national team are eligible to play in the World Cup and the European Championship, whilst clubs can enter the UEFA Women's Champions League. The earliest known women's football match involving the French was a women's French team versus the Dick, Kerr's Ladies team from Preston, played at Goodison Park, Liverpool on Boxing Day 1920, attracted a crowd of 53,000 with another 10–15,000 reportedly turned away because the ground was full.

Although popular amongst girls, many experience prejudice and discrimination.

== History ==
The first recorded instance of women's football in France was in 1910 at a high school for young girls in Pont-à-Mousson (Meurthe-et-Moselle).

In 1919 the Fédération des sociétés féminines sportives de France (FSFSF), began organising women's football until 1933, when French Football Federation formally banned women's football. In 1940 the Vichy government upheld the ban of women's football.

Although as a recreational activity women's football was able to survive after World War 2, the first organised games dates back to July 1968 when Pierre Geoffroy a journalist from L'Union launched an appeal to organise a women's match during the annual fair. Fifteen women responded to this call. "In Reims, Humbécourt, Gerstheim, but also in the suburbs of Lyon, women's matches are being developed as a curtain raiser for men's matches, in order to entertain the men in the stands." But in Reims, the players are organizing themselves to perpetuate their practice within the Stade de Reims, which will become the women's team Stade de Reims Féminines. As pioneers, the Reims women footballers then embarked on the promotion of women's football. For five years, they toured internationally, even playing in front of 60,000 Indonesian spectators in Bandung. In the wake of Reims, other women's football teams were created, notably in Champagne-Ardenne, Bas-Rhin, Charente, and the suburbs of Lyon and Paris, which led the French Football Federation to officially recognise the practice on 23 March 1970 and about fifty teams during the year.

== Club football ==
As of 2021 the pyramid consists of four tiers: The top tier, then Division 2 which is split into two groups, followed by Division 3 which is split into four groups, which is then are fed from many Tier 4 regional leagues.

Division 1 Féminine was created in 1918 and placed under the aegis of the Fédération des Sociétés Féminines Sportives de France (FSFSF), a women's football organization led by pioneer Alice Milliat. The competition was organized for fourteen consecutive years until in 1932 women's football was banned. The most successful club during this period was by far Fémina Sports Paris with 12 titles. En Avant Paris captured two titles whilst Les Sportives de Paris won the remaining campaign.

In 1975 the women's football was officially rehabilitated and Division 1 Féminine returned to be organized thanks to the funds made available by the Fédération Française de Football (FFF). With the 2009-2010 season it went to professionalism, being the contracts previously signed semi-professional. Until the 1991–92 season, the championship included a first group stage followed by a direct elimination phase with a final to decree the winning team of the title. Starting from the 1992–93 season they went to an Italian group with round and back bets. Over the years there has been an alternation between the winning teams of the championship. In the 1970s, the Stade de Reims won the first three championships and in all five titles over eight years, from 1974 to 1982. The 1980s saw the dominance of the VGA Saint-Maur, able to win six titles between 1983 and 1990, four consecutive years between 1985 and 1988. In the 1990s there was an alternation in the wins of the Lyon-Juvisy championship before the four consecutive titles won by Toulouse between 1999 and 2002. From 2007 to 2018, Division 1 Féminine saw Lyon dominate and win twelve consecutive championships. This has made Lyon the most successful side since 1975 with 14 titles, followed by VGA Saint-Maur and Paris FC with six apiece.

Since the 2019-20 season France has seen the top 3 teams in Division 1 qualify for UEFA Women's Champions League tournament, before which two teams were sent. Lyon are the most successful team in the history of the tournament with seven wins and two other final appearances (3 more than German side Frankfurt). The other French side to have reached the final are PSG who have appeared twice without victory.

The national cup competition, the Coupe de France féminine, was first contested in 2002. Lyon have won 9 of the 19 finals, with only Montpellier (3), Lyon and PSG (2) the other only clubs to have won more than once. A total of 124 clubs took part in the 2020-21 tournament, participation of which is voluntary for clubs at Tier 4 level. The super cup, between the league and cup winners, is named Trophee des Championnes Féminin.

=== National leagues ===
From 2023–24 onwards :

Level	League(s)/Division(s)	
1	Première Ligue; 12 clubs	
2	Seconde Ligue; 12 clubs	
3	Division 3 Féminine; 24 clubs divided into 2 groups	
3	Group A 12 clubs	Group B 12 clubs
4	Alsace Honneur, Aquitaine Honneur, Atlantique Honneur, Auvergne Honneur, Lower Normandy Honneur, Burgundy Honneur, Brittany Honneur, Centre Honneur, Centre-Ouest Honneur, Champagne-Ardenne Honneur, Corsica Honneur, Franche-Comté Honneur, Languedoc-Roussillon Honneur, Lorraine Honneur, Maine Honneur, Provence Honneur, Midi-Pyrénées Honneur, Nord-Pas-de-Calais Honneur, Upper Normandy Honneur, Paris Honneur, Picardy Honneur, Rhône-Alpes Honneur	

== National team ==
On 17 April 1971, the French team played the first women's international football match recognized by FIFA against the Netherlands with Marie-Claire Caron-Harant and Jocelyne Ratignier scoring. The match took place in Hazebrouck, France and resulted in a 4–0 win for France.

The national team, who do not have a permanent home stadium, have qualified for the World Cup four times, firstly in 2003. Their most successful campaign came in 2011 where they reached the semi-finals. On the European stage they have qualified for every UEFA Women's Championship since 1997, and they have reached the quarter-final three times (2009, 2013, 2017). They have appeared twice at the Summer Olympics in 2012 and 2016. Their highest FIFA ranking was 3rd whilst in September 2009 they hit their lowest, 10th.

Their most capped player is Sandrine Soubeyrand with 198 appearances between 1997 and 2013. Their most prolific goalscorer is current player Eugénie Le Sommer who has scored 86 since her debut in 2009. Since 1987 there have been seven managers: Aimé Mignot (1987–1997), Élisabeth Loisel (1997–2007), Bruno Bini (2007–2013), Philippe Bergeroo (2013–2016), Olivier Echouafni (2016–2017), Corinne Diacre (2017–2023), Hervé Renard (2023–present).

The Under 19 team have appeared in the FIFA U-20 World Cup seven times since debuting in 2002. Their best result was a runners up spot in 2016. In the UEFA Under-19 Championship they have claimed the title at total of five times, whilst reaching the semi-finals a further five times. There is also an Under 17 side whose biggest success was winning the World Cup in 2012.

== 2023 World Cup advertisement ==
Before the 2023 FIFA Women's World Cup, the French telecom company Orange created a video using deepfake technology where real game footage of the French women's national team was edited to make the women's players appear as popular French men's national team players. At the end of the advertisement, it was revealed what viewers thought were men's highlights were actually women's highlights. The advertisement went viral. The purpose was to challenge prejudice against women's football.

== See also ==
- France women's national football team
- Football in France
- 2019 FIFA Women's World Cup
