= Stade Jules Lemaire =

Sports venue in Mons-en-Barœul

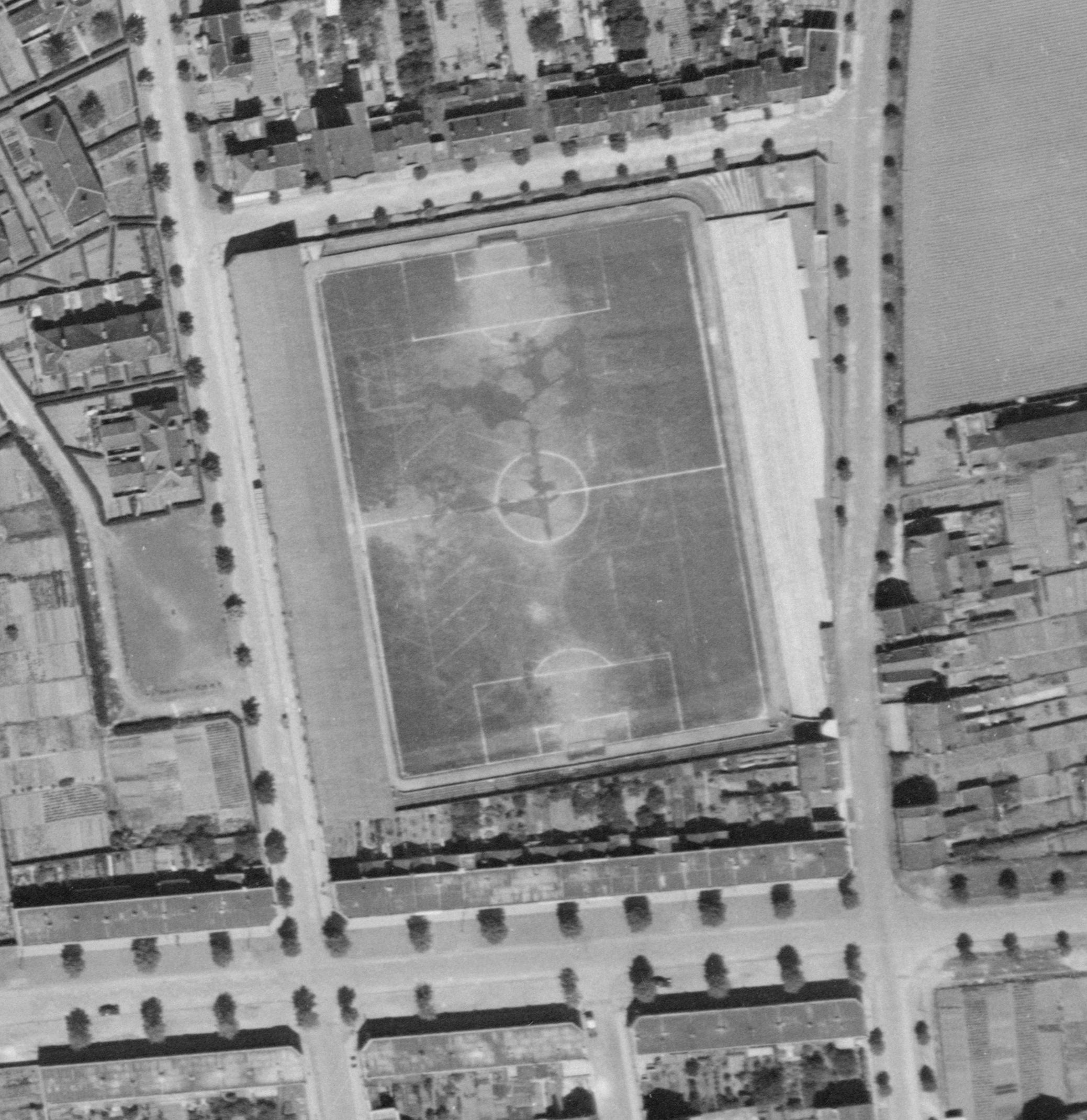
- The Jules Lemaire stadium in 1947
- Interactive map of Stade Jules Lemaire
- Former names: Stade Virnot
- Location: Mons-en-Barœul, Nord, France
- Capacity: 25,000

Construction
- Opened: 1901
- Renovated: 1932
- Demolished: 1959

Tenants
- SC Fives (1907–1944) Lille OSC (1944–1949)

The Stade Jules Lemaire, previously known as Stade Virnot, was a football stadium located in Mons-en-Barœul, a town bordering Lille, near the current avenue Virnot.

Inaugurated in 1901, it was mainly used by SC Fives, and then, after the Second World War, it became the first stadium of Lille OSC, which alternated it with the Stade Henri-Jooris. When the club decided to play only in the latter from 1949 onwards, Jules-Lemaire became useless and was demolished in 1959.

== History ==
=== Origins ===
When SC Fives was founded in 1901, then under the name Éclair Fivois, the club briefly played on a small, rudimentary pitch in the town of Fives, which soon became too small to accommodate the club's growing supporters. However, the municipality was reluctant to invest in building an arena for the club, so Albert Virnot, a wealthy merchant of coffee and cotton who lived in the neighboring town of Mons-en-Barœul, donated one of his plots of land to the Fives club as well as part of the money to build the first facilities (the rest came from the supporters). Even though this new pitch was located in Mons-en-Barœul, it was still much closer to Fives and Hellemmes than to the center of Mons. Virnot's motivations, who was better known for frequenting racetracks than for kicking a football, remain unclear, but either way, the new Éclair stadium was named Stade Virnot in gratitude for the gesture.

=== Golden age ===
On 25 May 1921, Stade Virnot hosted a match between Entente nordiste, a selection made up of players from Northern clubs (including four from Fives), and Celtic, which marked the first visit of a professional football team to Northern France; the French won 4–2.

Following the club's professionalization in 1932, the Virnot stadium was renovated and major work was carried out there: The orientation of the pitch was changed; the goals, which were on the axis of Rue Virnot/Jean-Jacques Rousseau, were placed in the other direction (Boulevard de la Paix/Avenue Cécile), and an official covered stand was built to accommodate just over 10,000 spectators. At the dawn of professionalism, players from Olympique Lillois and SC Fives faced each other there around ten times between 1933 and 1939 (in D1 or the Coupe de France). The houses surrounding the stadium became an extension of the stands on match days, with would-be spectators ringing its bells to ask for seats at the highest windows or even on the roofs of nearby houses.

In November 1937, the club's directors, having completely forgotten Albert Virnot, who died in 1910, renamed the venue to Stade Jules Lemaire, in honor of a SC Fives manager who had just died. AS Saint-Étienne only played one official match against SC Fives at Jules-Lemaire, which ended in a 3–2 victory for the home side.

In 1944, Olympique Lillois and SC Fives merged to create Lille LOSC, whose first football stadium thus was Jules-Lemaire. Initially, the club decided to alternate its home matches between the Jules-Lemaire (SCF) and the Henri-Jooris (OL), but on 17 February 1946, during a Lille–Lens derby at the Henri-Jooris, the roof of one of the stands collapsed on the spectators, which not only resulted in 53 injured, but also in the stadium being subsequently closed for the rest of the season. Thus, it was at the Jules-Lemaire stadium that Lille, during the 1945–46 season, achieved the first Cup–Championship double in its history.

=== Decline and collapse ===
Little by little, however, the club favored the Henri-Jooris, which had been expanded and renovated and could now accommodate 15,000 people; the Jules-Lemaire became the training ground until it was finally destroyed in 1959. In its place, a residential district was built with an avenue named Virnot.
