= Walter Kaiser (footballer) =

German footballer (1907–1982)

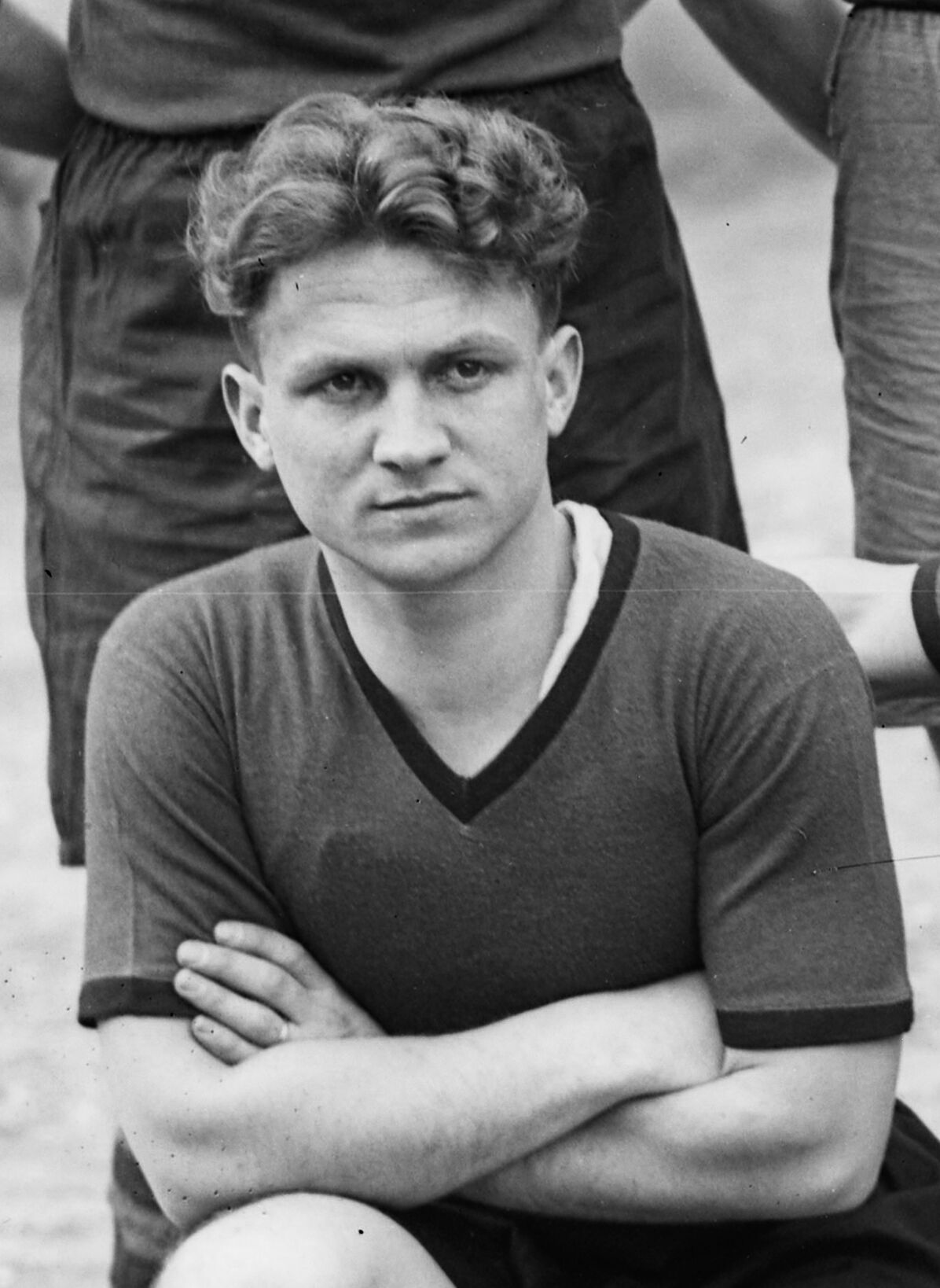
- Walter Kaiser in 1934

Personal information
- Date of birth: 2 November 1907
- Place of birth: Neuwied, Germany
- Date of death: 25 February 1982 (aged 74)
- Place of death: Rennes, France
- Position: Striker

Senior career*
Years	Team	Apps	(Gls)
1930–1938	Rennes	93	(52)
- * Club domestic league appearances and goals

Walter Kaiser (2 November 1907 – 25 February 1982) was a German professional footballer who played as a striker. Kaiser played in France for Rennes between 1930 and 1938, and was the Division 1 topscorer in the 1932–33 season, alongside Robert Mercier, scoring 15 goals.
