= 1937–38 French Division 1 =

6th season of French Division 1

Division Nationale
- Season: 1937–38

FC Sochaux-Montbéliard won Division 1 season 1937/1938 of the French Association Football League with 44 points.

== Participating teams ==
- FC Antibes
- AS Cannes
- SC Fives
- RC Lens
- Olympique Lillois
- Olympique de Marseille
- FC Metz
- RC Paris
- Red Star Olympique
- Excelsior AC Roubaix
- RC Roubaix
- FC Rouen
- FC Sète
- FC Sochaux-Montbéliard
- RC Strasbourg
- US Valenciennes-Anzin
Location of teams in 1937–38 Division 1

== Final table ==
Pos	Team	Pld	W	D	L	GF	GA	GAv	Pts	Qualification or relegation
1	Sochaux (C)	30	18	8	4	69	26	2.654	44	
2	Marseille	30	15	12	3	61	35	1.743	42	
3	Sète	30	16	9	5	52	28	1.857	41	
4	Rouen	30	14	8	8	57	44	1.295	36	
5	Strasbourg	30	12	9	9	66	54	1.222	33	
6	Excelsior	30	10	11	9	59	57	1.035	31	
7	Lillois	30	10	9	11	39	33	1.182	29	
8	Roubaix	30	11	6	13	39	60	0.650	28	
9	Cannes	30	8	11	11	56	47	1.191	27	
10	Antibes	30	9	9	12	38	40	0.950	27	
11	Metz	30	8	11	11	45	56	0.804	27	
12	Fives	30	7	12	11	42	43	0.977	26	
13	Racing Paris	30	9	8	13	48	59	0.814	26	
14	Lens	30	9	8	13	45	63	0.714	26	
15	Red Star (R)	30	6	7	17	47	71	0.662	19	Relegation to French Division 2
16	Valenciennes (R)	30	6	6	18	30	77	0.390	18	Relegation to French Division 2

Rules for classification: Victory: 2 points, Draw: 1 point, Defeat: 0 points
(C) Champions; (R) Relegated

Promoted from Division 2, who will play in Division 1 season 1938/1939:

- Le Havre AC: Champion of Division 2
- AS Saint-Étienne: Runner-up Division 2

== Results ==
Home \ Away	FCA	CAN	EAR	SCF	RCL	LIL	OM	MET	RCP	RSO	RCR	ROU	SÈT	SOC	RCS	VAL
Antibes		2–0	4–2	1–1	1–1	0–0	0–3	2–0	2–2	4–1	5–0	0–1	1–1	2–1	1–2	0–0
Cannes	2–1		2–1	0–0	5–0	3–1	1–1	4–0	2–2	5–5	2–3	6–1	3–4	0–1	2–3	5–0
Excelsior Roubaix	2–1	2–2		3–2	1–1	2–2	4–2	2–4	3–2	3–1	1–2	2–0	2–2	1–2	3–2	5–0
Fives	3–1	2–2	4–4		2–1	0–1	2–1	3–0	1–0	3–0	3–0	0–1	1–2	1–1	1–1	2–2
Lens	2–4	2–2	2–2	3–2		2–1	4–3	2–3	2–1	1–3	2–1	1–1	0–2	0–2	2–3	2–1
Olympique Lillois	4–0	0–0	1–1	2–1	3–0		1–1	3–1	0–1	4–1	1–1	4–0	2–1	0–0	2–0	0–1
Marseille	1–0	2–2	1–1	1–1	2–2	4–0		4–0	2–1	1–0	5–1	1–1	3–0	2–0	2–1	1–1
Metz	1–1	1–0	1–2	0–0	1–1	1–0	1–2		4–4	3–0	1–1	1–1	1–1	2–2	4–0	1–0
Racing Paris	1–2	3–1	5–1	1–1	1–3	1–0	3–3	2–2		2–1	2–1	2–1	0–2	0–4	0–3	0–3
Red Star Olympique	0–1	2–1	2–2	3–2	0–1	3–2	0–1	2–2	2–2		7–0	2–2	1–4	0–1	2–2	2–0
Racing Roubaix	2–1	4–1	1–0	0–0	3–1	3–0	1–3	2–3	2–1	0–0		0–3	1–1	2–2	0–2	3–2
Rouen	2–0	1–0	1–3	2–2	3–1	0–0	2–2	2–1	3–1	4–0	2–0		3–1	1–3	3–0	4–1
Sète	0–0	1–1	3–0	1–0	3–1	3–1	1–1	4–1	2–2	3–1	0–1	1–0		0–1	3–0	3–0
Sochaux	1–0	1–1	1–1	6–2	4–0	2–0	1–2	3–2	4–0	3–1	3–0	5–0	0–1		3–3	6–1
Strasbourg	3–0	1–0	3–3	2–0	2–2	0–0	2–2	1–1	1–3	9–3	4–0	3–3	0–2	1–6		10–0
Valenciennes	1–1	0–1	1–0	1–0	1–3	0–4	1–2	5–2	1–3	3–2	2–4	1–9	0–0	0–0	1–2	

Legend: Blue = home team win; Yellow = draw; Red = away team win.

== Top goalscorers ==
Rank	Player	Club	Goals
1	(France) Jean Nicolas	Rouen	26
2	(Germany) Oskar Rohr	Strasbourg	25
3	(France) (Hungary) Désiré Koranyi	Sète	24
4	(Kingdom of Yugoslavia) Ivan Petrak	Cannes	23
5	(France) (Switzerland) Roger Courtois	Sochaux	22
6	(France) (Hungary) André Simonyi	Red Star	21
7	(France) Mario Zatelli	Marseille	20
