= Première Ligue =

Women's association football league in France

- Organising body: LFFP
- Founded: 1975; 51 years ago
- Country: France
- Confederation: UEFA
- Number of clubs: 12
- Level on pyramid: 1
- Relegation to: Seconde Ligue
- Domestic cups: Coupe de France Féminine; Trophée des Championnes
- League cup: Coupe LFFP
- International cup: UEFA Women's Champions League
- Current champions: Lyon (19th title) (2025–26)
- Most championships: Lyon (19 titles)
- Broadcasters: Canal+; DAZN; France Télévisions; Groupe M6
- Current: 2026–27 season

The Première Ligue (French: [pʁəmjɛʁ liɡ]), officially known as Arkema Première Ligue for sponsorship reasons, is a professional women's association football league at the highest level of the French football league system, and is run by the Ligue féminine de football professionnel (LFFP). Its annual competition features twelve teams playing two series of round-robin matches from September to June, to determine the four participants of a single-elimination tournament. The winners of the tournament are crowned champions of France, and contest the Trophée des Championnes match the following season. At the end of each season, the top three teams qualify for the UEFA Women's Champions League, while the two bottom teams are relegated to the Seconde Ligue.

The "Première Ligue" is the latest iteration of a competition founded in 1975 by the French Football Federation (FFF) as the amateur Division 1 Féminine. Professionalism was introduced for the first time in the 2009–10 season. The competition was ranked the best women's league in Europe according to UEFA 2019–20 women's association club coefficients. Lyon have won the league the most times (19), and also hold the record for consecutive wins (14).

== History ==
The first women's association football league in France was founded in 1919 by the Fédération des Sociétés Féminines Sportives de France (FSFSF), a women's football organization in France that was led by women's football pioneer Alice Milliat. The league lasted for twelve seasons before disbanding due to the prohibition of women's football. In this context, women replaced the men who left for the war in the industries and on the farms, in addition, they invested in the sport field, thus in soccer too.

The very first match of the French women's championship took place on the morning of 23 March 1919 at the Brancion stadium in Paris, between "Fémina Sport" and "En Avant". Fémina Sport would have won 2-0, with a score of 3-1 also being mentioned. The first two editions of the championship only involved Parisian teams. In April 1933, football was officially removed from sports organized by the FSFSF, due to the growing disinterest of women in the sport, which was subject to strong criticism following this detachment. The Paris Women's Football League, created in 1933, took over, and on 26 November 1933 organized a Paris women's championship with ten clubs that lasted until 1937. In 1975, women's football was officially re-instated and a new league, the Division 1 Féminine, was established by the governing body of football in France, the French Football Federation. Professionalism was introduced in 2009–10 season and female football players in France began signing professional contracts with their clubs at the same season, the most notable of which is Olympique Lyonnais (now known as OL Lyonnes).

In July 2022, it was announced that the Division 1 Féminine would feature in the FIFA 23 video game.

Before the beginning of the 2024–25 season, the league's name changed from Division 1 to Première Ligue.

== Competition format ==
There are 12 clubs in the "Première Ligue". During the course of a season, usually from September to June, each club plays the others twice, once at their home stadium and once at that of their opponents, for a total of 22 games, though clubs are allowed to host "big" matches at the home venues of their male counterparts, such as when Paris Saint-Germain hosted Juvisy at the Parc des Princes during the 2009–10 season. The female leagues, until the 2016–17 season, were run similarly to the men's amateur leagues in France with teams receiving four points for a win and two points for a draw. one point was awarded for a loss however, the league now adopts the 3-1-0 system. the Teams are ranked by total points, then goal difference, and then goals scored. At the end of each season, the club with the most points is crowned champion. If points are equal, the goal difference and then goals scored determine the winner. If still equal, teams are deemed to occupy the same position. If there is a tie for the championship, for relegation, or for qualification to other competitions, a play-off match at a neutral venue decides rank. The two lowest placed teams are relegated to the Seconde Ligue (formerly known as Division 2 Féminine) and the winners of the two groups in D2 Féminine are promoted in their place.

From 1974 to 1992, the league consisted of several groups with the winners of each group entering a play-off phase to determine the champion. Between the years 2001–2004, a play-off system was re-adopted. The top four clubs in the league table were inserted into a play-off bracket following the completion of the season with the winner being crowned champions. The play-offs among the four best teams were reintroduced beginning with the 2023–24 season.

=== European qualification ===
Until the 2019–20 edition, only the top two teams in the Division 1 Féminine qualified for the round of 32 of the UEFA Women's Champions League.

From 2020–21 to 2024–25, as determined by the UEFA women's coefficient, the Première Ligue winner directly qualified for the group stage of the Champions League, whereas the second team qualified for the second round and the third team qualified for the first round.

Since the 2021–22 edition, as determined by the UEFA women's coefficient, the top three teams have qualified for the Champions League. With the Première Ligue ranked as the top UEFA women's league going into the 2025–26 season, the champion and runner-up automatically enter the league phase, and the third-place team enters in the third round.

Given the PL's current standing among UEFA women's leagues, the only PL team that can possibly enter the UEFA Women's Europa Cup, the second-tier women's club competition launched in 2025–26, is the third-place finisher. Should that team lose in the third round of the Champions League, it will parachute into the Europa Cup.

UEFA does not provide automatic entry for any domestic cup winner into either of its women's club competitions. As a result, the winner of the Coupe de France féminine, the female equivalent of the Coupe de France, can only qualify for European competition if it finishes in the top three in the PL.

== Clubs ==
2025–26 Première Ligue teams
| Team | 2024–25 | Location | Venue |
|---|---|---|---|
| AS Saint-Étienne | 10th | Saint-Étienne | Stade Etivallière |
| Dijon FCO | 4th | Dijon | Stade Gaston Gérard |
| FC Fleury 91 | 5th | Bondoufle | Stade Robert Bobin |
| FC Nantes | 7th | Nantes | Stade Marcel-Saupin |
| Le Havre AC | 8th | Le Havre | Stade Océane |
| Les Marseillaises | 1st (D2) | Marseille | OM Campus |
| Montpellier HSC | 6th | Montpellier | Bernard Gasset Training Centre |
| OL Lyonnes | 1st | Décines-Charpieu | Parc Olympique Lyonnais |
| Paris FC | 3rd | Paris | Stade Sébastien Charléty |
| Paris Saint-Germain | 2nd | Saint-Germain-en-Laye | Campus PSG |
| RC Lens | 2nd (D2) | Arras | Stade François Blin |
| RC Strasbourg Alsace | 9th | Strasbourg | Stade de la Meinau |

== Top scorers ==
Included in the table below is a list of the top scorers of each season, starting from the 2001–02 season. Information for previous seasons unavailable.

| Season | Goals scored | Player |
|---|---|---|
| 2001–02 | 22 | (France) Marinette Pichon (Saint-Memmie Olympique) |
| 2002–03 | 26 | (France) Sandrine Brétigny (Lyon) |
| 2003–04 | 18 | (France) Claire Morel (Lyon) |
| 2004–05 | 38 | (France) Marinette Pichon (Juvisy) |
| 2005–06 | 36 | (France) Marinette Pichon (Juvisy) |
| 2006–07 | 42 | (France) Sandrine Brétigny (Lyon) |
| 2007–08 | 27 | (France) Laëtitia Tonazzi (Juvisy) |
| 2008–09 | 27 | (Brazil) Kátia (Lyon) |
| 2009–10 | 19 | (France) Eugénie Le Sommer (Saint-Brieuc) |
| 2010–11 | 20 | (France) Laëtitia Tonazzi (Juvisy) |
| 2011–12 | 22 | (France) Eugénie Le Sommer (Lyon) |
| 2012–13 | 24 | (Sweden) Lotta Schelin (Lyon) |
| 2013–14 | 25 | (France) Gaëtane Thiney (Juvisy) |
| 2014–15 | 34 | (Sweden) Lotta Schelin (Lyon) |
| 2015–16 | 33 | (Norway) Ada Hegerberg (Lyon) |
| 2016–17 | 20 | (Norway) Ada Hegerberg (Lyon) (France) Eugénie Le Sommer (Lyon) |
| 2017–18 | 31 | (Norway) Ada Hegerberg (Lyon) |
| 2018–19 | 22 | (France) Marie-Antoinette Katoto (Paris Saint-Germain) |
| 2019–20 | 16 | (France) Marie-Antoinette Katoto (Paris Saint-Germain) |
| 2020–21 | 22 | (Jamaica) Khadija Shaw (Bordeaux) |
| 2021–22 | 18 | (France) Marie-Antoinette Katoto (Paris Saint-Germain) |
| 2022–23 | 17 | (France) Kadidiatou Diani (Paris Saint-Germain) |
| 2023–24 | 18 | (Malawi) Tabitha Chawinga (Paris Saint-Germain) |
| 2024–25 | 18 | (France) Clara Mateo (Paris FC) |
| 2025–26 | 18 | (Netherlands) Romée Leuchter (Paris Saint-Germain) |

== Awards ==
In addition to the winner's trophy and the individual winner's medal players receive, the National Union of Professional Footballers (UNFP) awards the UNFP Female Player of the Year award to the top female player of the league. The current winner of the award is German international and Lyon midfielder Dzsenifer Marozsán. Following the 2009–10 season, the French Football Federation, who oversee the league, also began awarding a Player of the Year trophy. The jury panel who decided the winner consists of the twelve managers in the D1 Féminine. The Division 1 Féminine Player of the Month award was added in 2020.

== Sponsorship ==
In 2019, the French chemical company Arkema became the first title sponsor of the league, marking a significant step in the professionalisation and visibility of women’s football in France.

In November 2025, the French betting operator Betclic announced a new partnership with the Arkema Première Ligue with the agreement running until 2030 and covering five seasons.

== Presidents ==
| Name | Term start | Term end | Notes |
|---|---|---|---|
| Jean-Michel Aulas | 1 July 2024 | Incumbent | First president of the French Women’s Professional Football League (LFFP). |

== See also ==
- Women's sports
- Women's football in France
- List of foreign Première Ligue players
