= 1927–28 French Amateur Football Championship =

Association football championship

== Excellence Division ==
=== Overview ===
Stade Français won the championship.

=== Quarterfinals ===
- SO Montpellier 3-2 Stade Havrais

=== Semifinals ===
- Stade Français 6-2 SO Montpellier

== Honour Division ==
FC Mulhouse won the championship.
