= Horacio Neumann =

Argentine footballer

Personal information
- Full name: Ricardo-Horacio Neumann
- Date of birth: 12 July 1946
- Place of birth: Colonia Barón, La Pampa, Argentina
- Date of death: 29 May 2008 (aged 61)
- Position: Midfielder

Senior career*
Years	Team	Apps	(Gls)
1966–1972	Chacarita Juniors		
1972–1975	1. FC Köln	17	(2)
1974–1976	Bastia	35	(7)
1976–1977	Paris FC	13	(2)
1978	Chacarita Juniors		
1978–1979	Red Star Saint-Ouen		
Total		193	(32)
- * Club domestic league appearances and goals

Ricardo-Horacio Neumann (12 July 1946 – 29 May 2008) was an Argentine professional footballer who played for Chacarita Juniors in the Primera División Argentina and 1. FC Köln in the Bundesliga. Neumann was an important part of Chacarita Juniors championship-winning squad during the 1969 season. He then joined Bastia and Paris FC before coming back to Chacarita Juniors. He also played the 1978–79 season with Red Star. In May 2008, Neumann died of heart failure in Argentina.
