= Patrick Van Kets =

Belgian footballer and manager (1966–2022

Personal information
- Date of birth: 12 December 1966
- Place of birth: Duffel, Belgium
- Date of death: 26 September 2022 (aged 55)
- Height: 1.80 m (5 ft 11 in)
- Position: Striker

Youth career
- K.R.C. Mechelen

Senior career*
Years	Team	Apps	(Gls)
1988–1989	K.R.C. Mechelen	31	(11)
1989–1991	Sint-Truiden	47	(12)
1991–1993	Beerschot	34	(16)
1993–1997	Le Mans	136	(53)
1997–1998	Chamois Niortais	33	(4)
1998–1999	Gazélec Ajaccio	34	(19)
1999–2000	Racing Paris	33	(15)
2000–2001	Red Star	29	(10)
2001–2002	US Albi	4	(0)

Managerial career
- 2014–2015: Standard Liège U21
- 2015–2017: Sint-Truidense (assistant)
- 2017–2019: Sint-Truidense Academy
- 2019: Al Ain FC (assistant)
- 2020–2021: Waasland-Beveren (assistant)
- 2021: Kerala Blasters (assistant)
- * Club domestic league appearances and goals

Patrick Van Kets (12 December 1966 – 26 September 2022) was a Belgian professional footballer and manager.

== Club career ==
Van Kets started his professional career with the Belgian side K.R.C. Mechelen, debuting for their senior side in 1988. After spending a season there, he made a move Sint Truidense. Van Kets is best known for his career with Le Mans FC. Playing for the French club between 1993 and 1997, he is one of the top scorers for the Le Mans with 53 goals in four seasons. He was also the second top scorer in Ligue 2 in 1995 and 1996. After leaving Le Mans, he played for one season at Gazélec Ajaccio, the opponent of Le Mans FC for accession to Ligue 2. Van Kets spent the final season of his career with the French side US Albi, before retiring in 2002.

== Managerial career ==
In 2014, Van Kets was appointed as the manager of the U-21 side of Belgian stint Standard Liège. He returned to his former club Sint Truidense, this time as their assistant manager in 2015.

In 2016, he was appointed as the club's youth academy manager. After spending two seasons with the academy, he signed with the UAE Pro League side Al Ain FC in 2019 as the assistant to Ivan Leko, thus ending his four-year association with Sint Truidenese. His next stint was with Belgian First Division A side Waasland-Beveren after signing with them in 2020 as their assistant manager.

On 17 June 2021, Indian Super League club Kerala Blasters appointed Van Kets as their assistant manager to the new boss Ivan Vukomanović. He left the Kerala Blasters camp on 11 October due to a personal emergency.

== Death ==
Van Kets suffered from ALS, a muscle disorder. He died on 26 September 2022.
