= Fives, Nord =

Human settlement in France

Coordinates: 50°37′N 3°06′E

Fives (French pronunciation: [fiv]) is a former commune in the Nord department in northern France. It has been part of Lille since 1858.

It gave its name to an engineering group founded in the nineteenth century, the Compagnie de Fives-Lille.

== Heraldry ==
Arms of Fives	The arms of Fives are blazoned : Azure semy de lys Or, the bust of saint Nicaise proper mitred argent. (bust in this case being head and shoulders)

== See also ==
- Communes of the Nord department
- SC Fives, a former French football club from Fives
