= Jean-Louis Lima =

French footballer (born 1967)

Personal information
- Date of birth: 26 August 1967 (age 59)
- Place of birth: Asnières-sur-Seine, France
- Height: 1.78 m (5 ft 10 in)
- Position: Forward

Senior career*
Years	Team	Apps	(Gls)
1984–1990	Racing Paris 1		
1990–1994	Nantes		
1994–1997	Laval		
1997–2000	Louhans-Cuiseaux		

Managerial career
- 2011–2012: Lens (coach)
- * Club domestic league appearances and goals

Jean-Louis Lima (born 26 August 1967) is a French former professional footballer who played as a forward.
