= 1953–54 French Division 2 =

15th season of the second-tier football league in France

Division 2
- Season: 1953–54

Statistics of Division 2 in the 1953–54 season.

== Overview ==
It was contested by 20 teams, and Olympique Lyonnais won the championship.

== League standings ==
Pos	Team	Pld	W	D	L	GF	GA	GD	Pts	Promotion or relegation
1	Olympique Lyonnais	38	25	8	5	108	44	+64	58	Promoted
2	AS Troyes	38	24	7	7	101	34	+67	55	Promoted
3	RC Paris	38	25	5	8	107	48	+59	55	Promoted
4	Rouen	38	23	6	9	81	47	+34	52	
5	Sedan Torcy	38	19	11	8	77	41	+36	49	
6	Stade Rennais	38	19	6	13	86	53	+33	44	
7	Red Star Paris	38	20	4	14	71	59	+12	44	
8	Perpignan	38	16	7	15	49	63	−14	39	
9	Nantes	38	14	8	16	68	62	+6	36	
10	Valenciennes	38	16	4	18	56	62	−6	36	
11	Angers	38	12	11	15	53	58	−5	35	
12	Aix-en-Provence	38	14	7	17	53	67	−14	35	
13	Cannes	38	12	10	16	49	55	−6	34	
14	Besançon	38	11	11	16	50	65	−15	33	
15	Grenoble	38	12	9	17	54	80	−26	33	
16	Béziers	38	10	7	21	41	92	−51	27	
17	Olympique Alès	38	10	7	21	31	83	−52	27	
18	Toulon	38	11	4	23	45	82	−37	26	
19	CA Paris	38	8	7	23	56	91	−35	23	
20	Montpellier	38	5	9	24	23	73	−50	19	

Source: rsssf.com
