= Richard Akiana =

Congolese footballer (born 1969)

Personal information
- Full name: Didier Richard Akiana Kaba
- Date of birth: 20 September 1969 (age 57)
- Place of birth: Brazzaville, Congo
- Position: Forward

Senior career*
Years	Team	Apps	(Gls)
1990–1991	Créteil		
1991–1992	CO Saint-Dizier		
1993–1994	Racing Club de France		
1994–1995	Paris FC		
?–1997	Racing Club de France		
1997	FC Bourges		
1998	Créteil		
1998–1999	Troyes	23	(4)
1999–2000	Red Star		
2000–2002	ES Wasquehal	15	(2)
2002–2004	Gap FC		

International career
1992–2000	Congo	9	(0)
- * Club domestic league appearances and goals

Didier Richard Akiana Kaba (born 20 September 1969) is a Congolese footballer who played as a forward, spending his professional career in France. He made nine appearances for the Congo national team from 1992 to 2000. He was also named in Congo's squad for the 2000 African Cup of Nations tournament.
