= Robert Mercier =

French footballer (1909-1958)

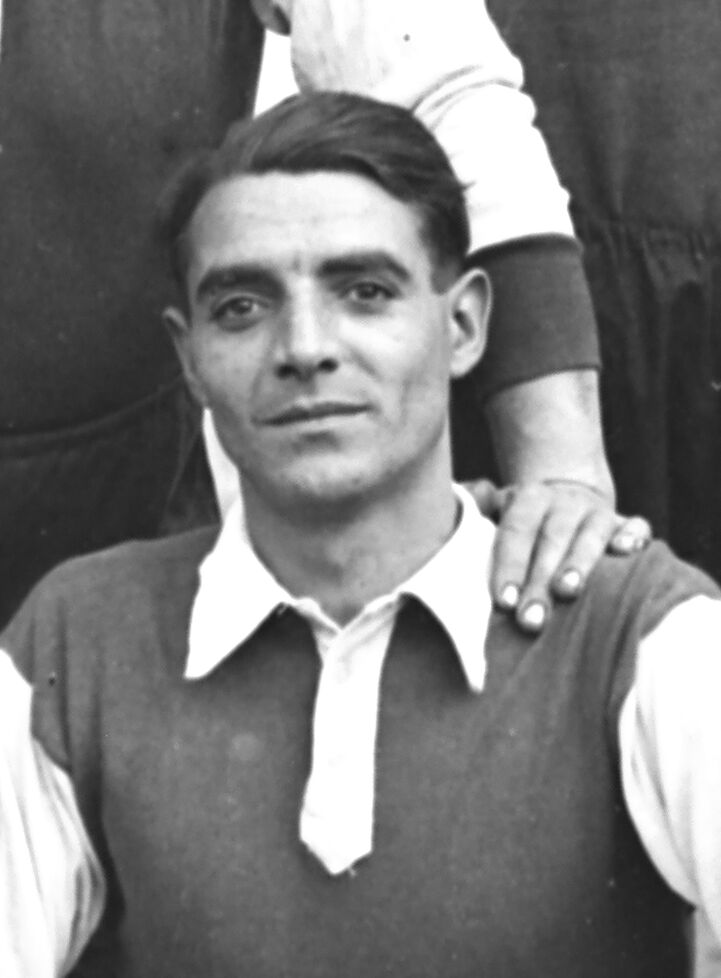
- Mercier in 1933

Personal information
- Date of birth: 14 October 1909
- Place of birth: Paris, France
- Date of death: 23 September 1958 (aged 48)
- Position: Forward

Senior career*
Years	Team	Apps	(Gls)
1929–1934	Club Français	39	(40)
1934–1937	RC Paris	71	(41)
1937–1938	RC Arras	28	(18)
Total		138	(99)

International career
1931–1935	France	7	(3)

Managerial career
- 1938–1939: FC Dieppe
- * Club domestic league appearances and goals

Robert Mercier (14 October 1909 – 23 September 1958) was a French footballer who played as a forward for Club Français, RC Paris and RC Arras. Alongside Walter Kaiser, he was the Ligue 1 first top goalscorer with 15 goals in 1932–33. After his playing career, he became a coach with FC Dieppe.

== External links and references ==
- Profile at FFF
