= Fémina Sport =

French football club

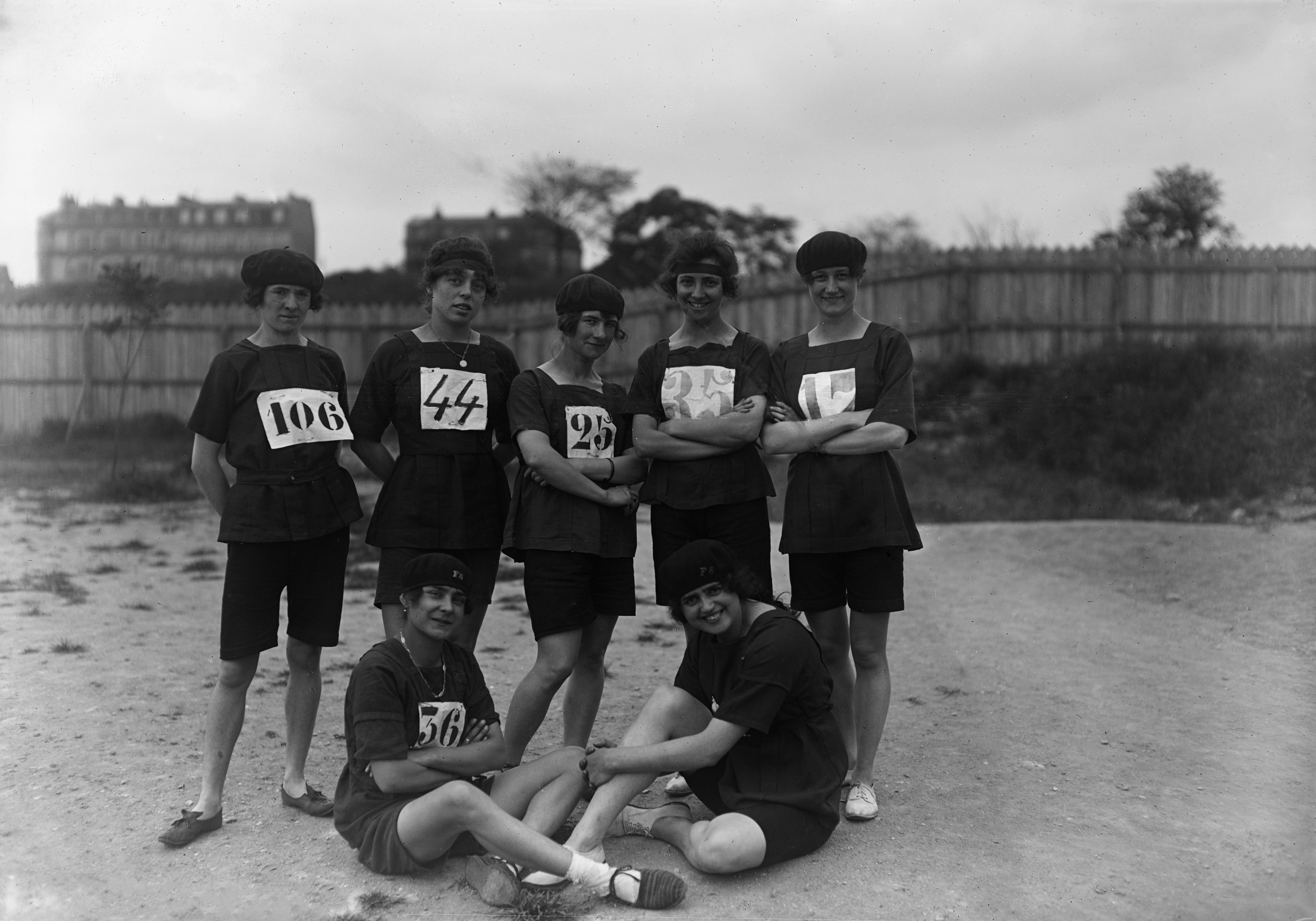
Fémina Sport Athletes, 1920

Fémina Sport is a football club based in Paris, France.

== History ==
Fémina Sport was founded in 1912. In 1917, Fémina Sport competed in the first women's football match. The club were known for their early success, winning many league titles during the 1910s to 1930s.
