= Fédération des sociétés féminines sportives de France =

French women's sport organisation

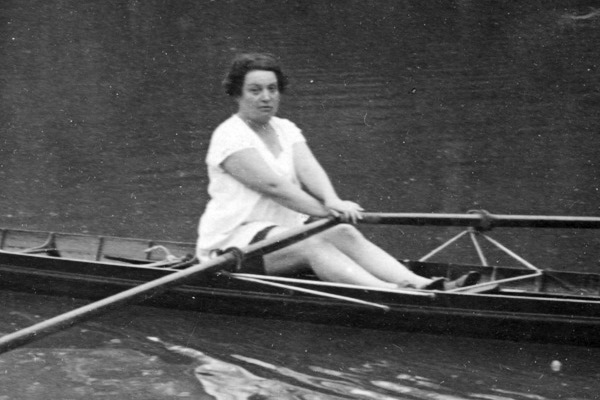
- Alice Milliat, president of the FSFSF from 1919–25 and 1930–36.
- Abbreviation: FSFSF
- Formation: 1917
- Founder: Alice Milliat; Pierre Payssé; Albert Pelan
- Founded at: France
- Dissolved: 1936
- Purpose: Promotion of women's sport
- Location: France

The Fédération des sociétés féminines sportives de France (FSFSF, later the Fédération feminine sportive de France (FFSF)) was a French organisation set up to promote women's sport. The FSFSF was responsible for the French women's football championship from 1919 until 1932, and organised the Women's Olympiad, an alternative to the Olympic Games, between 1921 and 1923.

== History ==
The Fédération des sociétés féminines sportives de France (FSFSF) was founded in December 1917. In January 1918, the French Athletics Federation refused to take responsibility for women's sport, and the FSFSF was officially recognised as an organiser of women's sport. Alice Milliat, Pierre Payssé and Albert Pelan, were founding members. Payssé and Pelan were both organisers of existing women's sports organisations. The first president of the FSFSF was surgeon Fauvre de Bouvet, and the FSFSF's initial board contained only two female members: Milliat and Marie Surcouf. In 1919, Milliat became the FSFSF's president, and from that time, the organisation was only run by women. The FSFSF did not class itself as a feminist movement. In 1921, the organisation officially renamed itself the Fédération feminine sportive de France (FFSF). Milliat resigned as president in 1925, and later became president again from 1930 until 1936. The FSFSF was disbanded in 1936, after Milliat resigned as president of the organisation.

== Sports ==
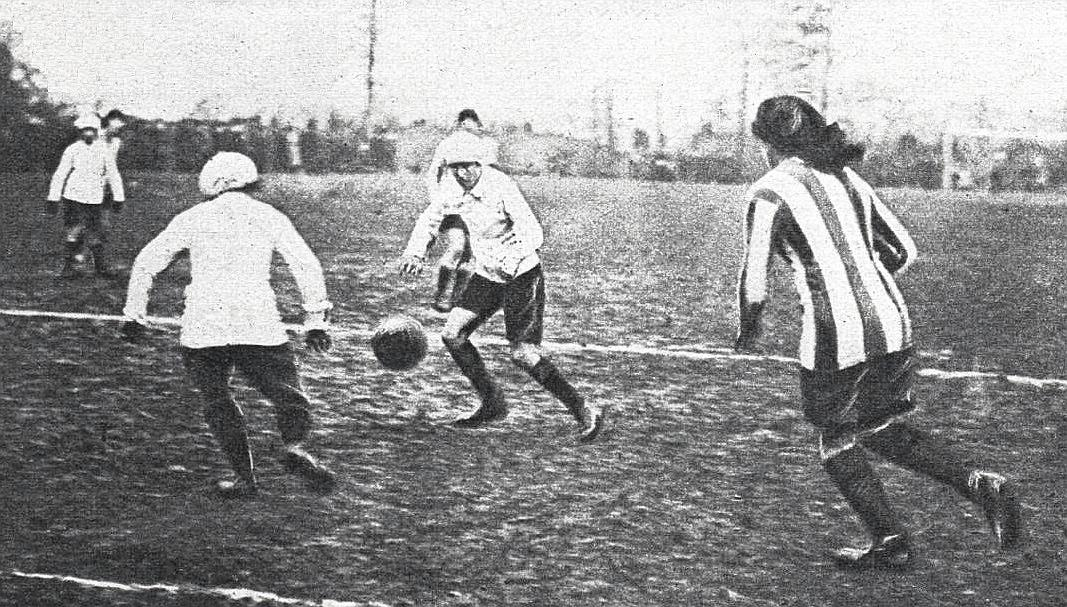
Football match between Fémina Sport and En Avant in 1920

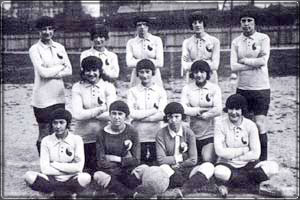
The French football team, which was run by FSFSF, in 1920.

The FSFSF sought to promote sports that were seen as "unfeminine" at the time. Its sports included athletics, pushball, field hockey, basketball, swimming, rowing, and cross country running. These sports had been disregarded by another women's sports organisation, the Union française de gymnastique féminine, which chose to focus on "feminine sports". The FSFSF collaborated with existing women's sports clubs Fémina Sport, and En Avant, which were both founded in 1912, and Académia, which was founded in 1913.

Championnat de France de football féminin
- Organising body: FSFSF
- Founded: 1919
- Folded: 1933
- Country: France
- Number of clubs: 2–16
- Last champions: Fémina Sport (1932)
- Most championships: Fémina Sport (11)

From 1919 until 1932, the FSFSF were responsible for the French women's football championship, the Championnat de France de football féminin. The first championship in 1919 featured two teams: Fémina Sport and En Avant. They competed in a two-legged tie, which was won on aggregate by Fémina Sport. In 1924, 16 teams competed in the league, which reduced to eight teams in 1931. There was criticism of the effects of playing football on women's health, and a concern that the league was heavily orientated towards Paris, where most teams were based. In 1933, women's football was banned by the French Football Federation, and the Championnat de France de football féminin was ended. In total, Fémina Sport won the championship 11 times, En Avant won twice, and Les Sportives de Paris won the title once.

In 1920, a French XI organised by the FSFSF travelled to England to play four football matches against Dick, Kerr Ladies F.C. Dick, Kerr Ladies travelled to France later in the year to play four more matches against a French XI; the match at Stade Pershing in Paris attracted 22,000 supporters. In 1922, an FSFSF team played matches against a British XI in Plymouth and Exeter, United Kingdom and a Cornish XI in Falmouth, Cornwall, United Kingdom.

In 1921, after it was announced that women could not compete in athletics events at the 1924 Summer Olympics, Milliat and the FSFSF organised the Olympiades Feminines (Women's Olympiad). The FSFSF-organised events ran from 1921 to 1923. They were superseded by the Women's World Games, organised by the International Women's Sports Federation (FSFI); the FSFI and the British Women's Amateur Athletic Association also jointly organised the 1924 Women's Olympiad. The FSFI had been founded at a meeting following the 1921 Women's Olympiad.
