= SC Fives =

- Full name: Sporting Club Fives
- Founded: 1901; 124 years ago
- Dissolved: 1944; 81 years ago (merged with Olympique Lillois to become Lille OSC)
- Ground: Stade Jules Lemaire
- Capacity: 25,000
Home colours	Away colours

SC Fives was a French association football club from Fives, a suburb in the east of Lille. Founded in 1901, the club merged with Olympique Lillois in 1944 to form Lille OSC.

== Honours ==
Championnat de France

- Runners-up: 1934

Coupe de France

- Runners-up: 1941

== Coaches ==
- (England) George Berry: coach from 1936 to 1944, first coach of Lille OSC (1944–1946)

== Bibliography ==
- Paul Hurseau & Jacques Verhaeghe (1997). Olympique Lillois. Sporting Club Fivois. Lille O.S.C. Alan Sutton. ISBN 2842530802.
