= André Simonyi =

French footballer (1914–2002)

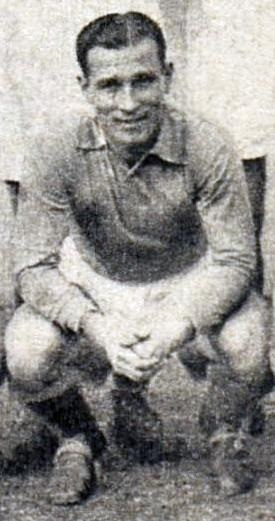
- Simonyi in 1942

Personal information
- Full name: András Simonyi
- Date of birth: 31 March 1914
- Place of birth: Huszt, Máramaros County, Kingdom of Hungary, Austria-Hungary
- Date of death: 17 July 2002 (aged 88)
- Place of death: Vieux-Moulin, Oise, France
- Height: 1.73 m (5 ft 8 in)
- Position: Forward

Senior career*
Years	Team	Apps	(Gls)
1931-1933	Attila Miskolc	39	(17)
1933–1935	Lille	51	(37)
1935–1936	Sochaux	15	(8)
1936–1946	Red Star 93	110	(79)
1946	Rennes	21	(13)
1947	Angers	33	(22)
1947–1948	Stade Français	16	(9)
1948–1949	Rouen	21	(6)
1949–1952	S.C. Covilhã	67	(59)
1952	Red Star 93	2	(0)
1953	Roubaix-Tourcoing	11	(5)
	S.C. Covilhã	19	(15)
- Avallon
–1962	AS Cherbourg	13	(4)
Total		397	(274)

International career
1942–1945	France	4	(1)

Managerial career
- 1947: Angers
- 1952–1953: Red Star 93
- 1959–1960: Red Star 93
- 1960–1962: AS Cherbourg
- * Club domestic league appearances and goals

András "André" Simonyi (31 March 1914 – 17 July 2002) was a footballer who played for Lille, Sochaux, Red Star 93, Rennes, Angers, Stade Français and Roubaix-Tourcoing. Born in Hungary, he represented the France national team.

He acquired French nationality by naturalization on 1 October 1937.

After retiring as a player, Simonyi enjoyed a management career with Angers, Red Star 93 and AS Cherbourg.
