= 1933 Coupe de France final =

- Event: 1932–33 Coupe de France
Excelsior AC Roubaix	RC Roubaix
3	1
- Date: 7 May 1933
- Venue: Olympique Yves-du-Manoir, Colombes
- Referee: Roger Conrié
- Attendance: 38,000

The 1933 Coupe de France final was a football match held at Stade Olympique Yves-du-Manoir, Colombes on May 7, 1933, that saw Excelsior AC Roubaix defeat RC Roubaix 3–1 thanks to goals by Marcel Langillier, Julien Buge and Norbert Van Caeneghem.

== Match details ==
7 May 1933

Excelsior AC Roubaix	3–1	RC Roubaix
Langiller 3'; Bugé 23'; Van Caeneghem 26'		Van Vooren 72'

Stade Olympique Yves-du-Manoir, Colombes
Attendance: 38,000
Referee: Roger Conrié

GK	(France) Lucien Gianelloni
DF	(England) Ernest Payne
DF	(France) Albert Dhulst
DF	(Scotland) David Bartlett
DF	(France) Célestin Delmer
MF	(France) Robert Barbieux
MF	(France) Henri Burghraeve
FW	(France) Julien Buge
FW	(France) Norbert Van Caeneghem
FW	(France) Noël Liétaer
FW	(France) Marcel Langiller (c)
Manager:
(England) Charles Griffiths Assistant Referees: Fourth Official:

GK	(France) François Encontre
DF	(France) Jules Cottenier
DF	(France) William Hewitt (c)
DF	(France) Marcel Lechanteux
DF	(France) Georges Verriest
MF	(France) Albert Lerouge
MF	(France) Jules Cossement
FW	(France) André Van Vooren
FW	(France) Edmond Leveugle
FW	(France) André Chauvel
FW	(France) Robert Van Vooren
Manager:
?

== See also ==
- 1932–33 Coupe de France
