= List of foreign Ligue 1 players: E =

This is a list of foreign players in the French Ligue 1, which commenced play in 1932. The following players must meet both of the following two criteria:

1. Have played at least one Ligue 1 game. Players who were signed by Ligue 1 clubs, but only played in lower league, cup and/or European games, or did not play in any competitive games at all, are not included.
2. Are considered foreign, i.e., outside France and its dependencies (Guadeloupe, Martinique, Reunion Island or French Polynesia), determined by the following:

A player is considered foreign if he is not eligible to play for the national teams of France.

More specifically,

- If a player has been capped on international level, the national team is used; if he has been capped by more than one country, the highest level (or the most recent) team is used. These include French players with dual citizenship. Players who played for France but came as foreign players (such as Miguel Ángel Lauri) are also listed.
- If a player has not been capped on international level, his country of birth is used, except those who were born abroad from French parents or moved to France at a young age, and those who clearly indicated to have switched his nationality to another nation.

Clubs listed are those that the player has played at least one Ligue 1 game for.

Seasons listed are those that the player has played at least one Ligue 1 game in. Note that seasons, not calendar years, are used. For example, "1992–95" indicates that the player has played in every season from 1992–93 to 1994–95, but not necessarily every calendar year from 1992 to 1995.

In bold: players still active in Ligue 1 and their respective teams in current season.

== Ecuador ==
- Aníbal Chalá – Dijon – 2020–21
- **Jhoanner Chávez** – **Lens** – 2023–25
- **Elías Legendre** – **Rennes** – 2025–
- **Willian Pacho** – **Paris SG** – 2024–
- Kendry Páez – Strasbourg – 2025–26
- Jackson Porozo – Troyes – 2022–23

== Egypt ==
- Hosny Abd Rabo – Strasbourg – 2005–06
- Mazhar Abdel Rahman – AS Monaco – 2002–03
- **Mohamed Abdelmonem** – **Nice** – 2024–25, 2026–
- Ahmed Abou Moslem – Strasbourg – 2005–06, 2007–08
- Anwar Gumei – Sète – 1932–33, 1934–35
- Ahmed Hassan – Le Havre – 2024–25
- Mido – Marseille – 2003–04
- Mostafa Mohamed – Nantes – 2022–26
- Ismail Rafaat – Sochaux, Sète – 1935–37

== England ==
- Chuba Akpom – Lille – 2024–25
- Clive Allen – Bordeaux – 1988–89
- Joe Allen – RC Roubaix – 1936–38
- **Sam Amo-Ameyaw** – **Strasbourg** – 2024–
- **Cameron Archer** – **Auxerre** – 2026–
- George Balmforth – Sète – 1932–33
- Ross Barkley – Nice – 2022–23
- William Barrett – Olympique Lillois – 1932–33
- David Bartlett – Excelsior Roubaix – 1932–34
- Fred Bartlett – Club Français – 1932–33
- Joey Barton – Marseille – 2012–13
- David Beckham – Paris SG – 2012–13
- Bill Berry – Fives – 1934–37
- Joe Bryan – Nice – 2022–23
- Alfred James Cable – CA Paris – 1932–33
- Alfred Caiels – Marseille – 1932–33
- Trevoh Chalobah – Lorient – 2020–21
- Ben Chilwell – Strasbourg – 2025–26
- Joe Cole – Lille – 2011–12
- **Charlie Cresswell** – Toulouse, **Rennes** – 2024–
- Laurie Cunningham – Marseille – 1984–85
- Cyril Dean – Rouen – 1938–39
- Karamoko Dembélé – Brest – 2022–24
- Jantzen Derrick – Paris SG – 1971–72
- **Eric Dier** – **AS Monaco** – 2025–
- George Eastman – Fives – 1932–35
- R.E. Edwards – Sète – 1932–33
- **CJ Egan-Riley** – **Marseille** – 2025–
- George Gibson – Valenciennes, RC Roubaix – 1935–36, 1936–37
- **Angel Gomes** – Lille, **Marseille** – 2021–
- **Alejandro Gomes Rodríguez** – **Lyon** – 2024–25
- Etienne Green – Saint-Étienne – 2020–22
- Mason Greenwood – Marseille – 2024–26
- Alfred Gunn – Sète – 1947–49
- John Hall – Sochaux – 1933–34
- George Harkus – Fives – 1932–33
- Mark Hateley – AS Monaco – 1987–90
- Rhys Healey – Toulouse FC – 2022–23
- Andrew Higgins – Olympique Lillois – 1935–36
- Joseph Hillier – Sochaux, Sète – 1932–33, 1933–36
- Stan Hillier – Cannes – 1932–34
- James Hindmarch – Cannes – 1996–98
- Glenn Hoddle – AS Monaco – 1987–90
- Joseph Hogan – RC Paris – 1932–33
- Sam Jennings – Marseille – 1932–33
- **Omari Kellyman** – **Strasbourg** – 2026–
- Frederick Kennedy – RC Paris – 1932–33, 1934–37
- Chris Kiwomya – Le Havre – 1996–97
- Levi Lumeka – Troyes – 2021–22
- Bert Lutterloch – Olympique Lillois – 1932–34
- Arden Maddison – SC Nîmes – 1934–35
- Brian Madjo – Metz – 2025–26
- Ainsley Maitland-Niles – Lyon – 2023–26
- Jack Major – CO Roubaix-Tourcoing – 1950–51
- Chris Makin – Marseille – 1996–97
- Cyril Martin – Marseille – 1947–48
- George Messon – Sète – 1947–48
- Leslie Miller – Sochaux – 1932–36
- Taylor Moore – Lens – 2014–15
- **Tyler Morton** – **Lyon** – 2025–
- Harold Newell – Saint-Étienne – 1939
- Ethan Nwaneri – Marseille – 2025–26
- Peter O'Dowd – Valenciennes – 1935–36
- Sheyi Ojo – Reims – 2018–19
- Jonathan Panzo – Monaco, Dijon – 2019–21
- Arthur Parkes – Club Français – 1932–33
- Ernest Payne – Excelsior Roubaix – 1932–35
- Arthur Phoenix – RC Paris – 1932–33
- Arthur Plummer – Valenciennes – 1935–36
- Walter Pollard – Sochaux – 1933–34
- Graham Rix – Caen, Le Havre – 1988–90, 1991–92
- John Roach – Sète – 1953–54
- Patrick Roberts – Troyes – 2021–22
- John Robertson – Sète – 1952–53
- Jonathan Rowe – Marseille – 2024–26
- Arthur Sales – Alès – 1932–33 and 1934–35
- George Scoones – Rennes – 1933–35
- Gus Smith – Sochaux – 1932–33
- Emran Soglo – Marseille – 2023–24
- Djed Spence – Rennes – 2022–23
- Simon Stainrod – Strasbourg – 1988–89
- Brian Stein – Caen – 1988–90
- Trevor Steven – Marseille – 1991–92
- J.A. Stewart – Rennes – 1936-3
- George Tadman – Sète – 1946–47
- Geoffrey Taylor – Rennes – 1949–51
- Arthur Thurley – Red Star – 1934–35
- Jack Trees – Marseille – 1932–34
- Hugh Vallance – Alès – 1932–33
- Chris Waddle – Marseille – 1989–92
- David Wall – Alès – 1934–35
- Harold Ward – SC Nîmes – 1932–34
- William West – Alès – 1932–33
- John Westwood – Valenciennes – 1956–57
- Frank White – RC Paris – 1937–38
- Ray Wilkins – Paris SG – 1987–88
- Josh Wilson-Esbrand – Reims – 2023–24
- Martin Woosnam – Club Français – 1932–33
- Billy Wright – Rouen – 1938–39

== References and notes ==
=== Books ===
- Barreaud, Marc (1998). Dictionnaire des footballeurs étrangers du championnat professionnel français (1932–1997). L'Harmattan, Paris. ISBN 2-7384-6608-7.
- Tamás Dénes; Pál Peterdi; Zoltán Rochy; József Selmeci (1999). Kalandozó magyar labdarúgók. ISBN 963-85967-0-8.

=== Club pages ===
- AJ Auxerre former players
- AJ Auxerre former players
- Girondins de Bordeaux former players
- Girondins de Bordeaux former players
- Les ex-Tangos (joueurs), Stade Lavallois former players
- Olympique Lyonnais former players
- Olympique de Marseille former players
- FC Metz former players
- AS Monaco FC former players
- Ils ont porté les couleurs de la Paillade... Montpellier HSC Former players
- AS Nancy former players
- FC Nantes former players
- OGC Nice former players
- Paris SG former players
- Red Star Former players
- Red Star former players
- Stade de Reims former players
- Stade Rennais former players
- CO Roubaix-Tourcoing former players
- AS Saint-Étienne former players
- Sporting Toulon Var former players

=== Others ===
- stat2foot
- footballenfrance
- French Clubs' Players in European Cups 1955–1995, RSSSF
- Finnish players abroad, RSSSF
- Italian players abroad, RSSSF
- Romanians who played in foreign championships
- Swiss players in France, RSSSF
- EURO 2008 CONNECTIONS: FRANCE, Stephen Byrne Bristol Rovers official site

== Notes ==
1. Born in France
2. Born in Sierra Leone
3. Born in South Africa
4. Born in Venezuela
5. Capped for the France national under-17 football team
6. Capped for the France national under-16 football team
7. Capped for the Luxembourg national football team
8. Capped for the Luxembourg national under-16 football team
9. Capped for the Portugal national under-15 football team
10. Capped for the Scotland national under-17 football team
11. Capped for the Scotland national under-16 football team
12. Capped for the United States men's national under-18 soccer team
13. Capped for the Venezuela national under-17 football team
