= Raoul Dutheil =

French footballer (1903–1945)

Personal information
- Birth name: Raoul Auguste Duteil
- Date of birth: 18 October 1903
- Place of birth: Saïda, Algeria
- Date of death: 3 April 1945 (aged 41)
- Place of death: Troyes, France
- Position: Forward

Senior career*
Years	Team	Apps	(Gls)
1923–1928	Strasbourg		
1928–1935	Cannes		

International career
1929	France	1	(0)
- * Club domestic league appearances and goals

Raoul Auguste Duteil (18 October 1903 – 3 April 1945) was a French footballer who played as a forward for Cannes and the French national team between 1929 and 1935.

== Career ==
Raoul Duteil was born in Saïda on 18 October 1903, as the son of Pierre Auguste Duteil (1874–1939) and Louise Jeanne Bugnez. He began his football career at Strasbourg in 1923, aged 20, with whom he played for five years, until 1928, when he joined AS Cannes. The following year, on 14 April 1929, the 25-year-old Dutheil earned his first (and only) international cap for France in a friendly match against Spain in Zaragoza, which ended in a resounding 8–1 loss. Described as a "very fast right winger who provides precise crosses and corners", Dutheil was also the last captain of the French military team.

Together with Louis Cler, Billy Aitken, and Charles Bardot, he was a member of the great Cannes team of the early 1930s, which won the Coupe de France in 1932, beating RC Roubaix 1–0 in the final, and achieved a runner-up finish in the inaugural edition of the French professional league, losing the final 4–3 to Olympique Lillois. After the Cup final, the journalists of the French newspaper Le Miroir des sports stated that he was "always dangerous, due to his haste and trepidation; misses easy shots, but he is capable of passing through a screen of opponents".

Dutheil stayed at Cannes for seven years, from 1928 until 1935, when he retired.

== Later life and death ==
Having married Dorothée Adrienne Guirao (1903–1993), Dutheil died in Troyes on 3 April 1945, at the age of 42.

== Honours ==
RC Strasbourg

- Alsace Championship
  - Champions (2): 1924 and 1927

AS Cannes

- Coupe de France
  - Champions: 1932
- Ligue 1
  - Runner-up: 1932–33
