= Joseph Beraudo =

French footballer (1908–1958)

Personal information
- Date of birth: 13 May 1908
- Place of birth: Cannes, France
- Date of death: 18 July 1958 (aged 50)
- Place of death: France
- Position: Midfielder

Senior career*
Years	Team	Apps	(Gls)
1929–1935	Cannes		
1935–1936	Nice		
1936–1937	Cannes		
1938–1941	Bocca Olympique		
- * Club domestic league appearances and goals

Joseph Beraudo (13 May 1908 – 18 July 1958) was a French footballer who played as a midfielder for Cannes in the early 1930s.

== Career ==
Born on 13 May 1908 in Cannes, Roux began his football career at his hometown club AS Cannes in 1929. Together with Louis Cler, Billy Aitken, and Charles Bardot, he was a member of the great Cannes team of the early 1930s, which won the Coupe de France in 1932, beating RC Roubaix 1–0 in the final, and achieved a runner-up finish in the inaugural edition of the French professional league, losing the final 4–3 to Olympique Lillois. The following day, the journalists of the French newspaper L'Auto (currently L'Équipe) described his performance as "weak".

Beraudo remained at Cannes for eight years, until 1935, when he left for Nice, where he played alongside his brother André, a striker who had also trained in Cannes. After only one season there, he returned to Cannes, where he retired in 1937, aged 29. In December 1938, he obtained an amateur license to play for a club based in La Bocca, Cannes, with whom he played at least until 1941.

== Death ==
Beraudo died in Cannes on 18 July 1958, at the age of 50.

== Honours ==
Cannes

- Coupe de France: 1932
- Ligue 1 runner-up: 1932–33
