= Francis Roux =

French footballer (1908–1998)

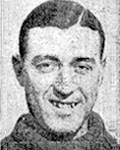
- Roux

Personal information
- Full name: Francis René Roux
- Date of birth: 20 March 1908
- Place of birth: Cannes, France
- Date of death: 24 July 1998 (aged 90)
- Place of death: Cannes, France
- Height: 1.76 m (5 ft 9 in)
- Position: Goalkeeper

Senior career*
| Years | Team | Apps | (Gls) |
| 1929–1935 | Cannes | | |
| 1935–1937 | RC Paris | | |
| 1937–1939 | Toulouse | | |
| 1939–1941 | Nice | | |

International career
| 1933 | France | 0 | (0) |

Managerial career
- Early 1940s: Cannes
- * Club domestic league appearances and goals

Francis René Roux (20 March 1908 – 24 July 1998) was a French footballer who played as a goalkeeper for Cannes in the early 1930s.

== Career ==
Born on 20 March 1908 in Cannes, Roux began his football career at his hometown club AS Cannes in 1929. Together with Louis Cler, Billy Aitken, and Charles Bardot, he was a member of the great Cannes team of the early 1930s, which won the Coupe de France in 1932, beating RC Roubaix 1–0 in the final, and achieved a runner-up finish in the inaugural edition of the French professional league, losing the final 4–3 to Olympique Lillois. After the Cup final, he was carried in triumph by the club's supporters, while in the league final, he was at fault for OL's second goal, being chipped after coming out from goal "very adventurously".

Roux was selected by Gaston Barreau, the then national team coach, for a friendly match against Germany in Berlin on 19 March 1933, but he remained an unused substitute in a 3–3 draw. He remained at Cannes for six years, until 1935, when he was signed by RC Paris, who were looking for a replacement for their Austrian international Rudi Hiden. In his first season at the club, he played over half of the matches as RC Paris won the cup and league double, although he did not play in the cup final. Despite earning 1,200 francs a month during his days at Cannes, Roux also worked as a cheese salesman, which allowed him to make 1,500 francs more; at Racing, he earned 5,000 francs a month.

After leaving RC Paris in 1937, Roux played two seasons at both Toulouse (1937–39) and Nice (1939–41). In total, he played 160 league matches. At some point in the early 1940s, he returned to his hometown club Cannes, now as a manager.

== Later life and death ==
Once he left the world of football, Vichy became a gymnastics teacher and later a physiotherapist.

Roux died in Cannes on 24 July 1998, at the age of 90.

== Honours ==
AS Cannes

- Coupe de France
  - Champions: 1932
- Ligue 1
  - Runner-up: 1932–33

RC Paris

- Coupe de France
  - Champions: 1936
- Ligue 1
  - Champions: 1935–36
