= Albert Dhulst =

French footballer (1909–1984)

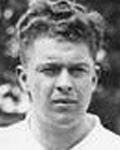
- Dhulst

Personal information
- Full name: Albert Henri Dhulst
- Date of birth: 25 September 1909
- Place of birth: Tourcoing, France
- Date of death: 19 April 1984 (aged 74)
- Place of death: Dole, Jura, France
- Height: 1.74 m (5 ft 9 in)
- Position: Defender

Senior career*
Years	Team	Apps	(Gls)
1929–1932	Tourcoing		
1932–1939	Excelsior Roubaix		
1945–1946	Roubaix-Tourcoing		

Managerial career
- 1946–1950: Dole
- 1950–1951: Racing Club lédonien
- 1951–1956: Dole
- * Club domestic league appearances and goals

Albert Henri Dhulst (25 September 1909 – 19 April 1984), sometimes misspelled as Albert D'Hulst, was a French footballer who played as a defender Excelsior Roubaix in the early 1930s.

== Playing career ==
Born on 25 September 1909 in Tourcoing, Dhulst began his football career at his hometown club US Tourcoing in 1929, aged 20, with whom he played for three years, until 1932, when he joined Excelsior Roubaix. In his first season at the club, together with Norbert Van Caeneghem, Célestin Delmer, and Marcel Langiller, he helped Excelsior win the Coupe de France title, beating RC Roubaix 3–1 in the final. The following day, the journalists of the French newspaper Le Miroir des sports stated that "Dhulst's mistakes were repaired by Ernest Payne".

Dhulst stayed at Excelsior for seven years, from 1932 until 1939, when the Second World War broke out, featuring in 193 out of the 194 Ligue 1 matches played during that period, thus being the player with the most Ligue 1 appearances in the pre-WWII period, as well as the player with the most Ligue 1 matches in Excelsior's history. Once the conflict ended in 1945, he returned to the pitches for one more season at Roubaix-Tourcoing, the result of the merger of Excelsior with RC Roubaix and US Tourcoing, playing a further two Ligue 1 matches before retiring in 1946, aged 37.

== Managerial career ==
After retiring, Dhulst worked as a manager. Having achieved promotion to the Division d'Honneur, the regional elite, Racing Club lédonien hired Dhulst, who was unable to avoid relegation at the end of the season.

== Personal life and death ==
On 5 February 1935, Dhulst married Marcelle Marie Grimonprez (1911–2011) in Wattrelos, and the couple had a daughter, Anny Andrée Flore Dhulst.

Dhulst died in Dole, Jura, on 19 April 1984, at the age of 74.

== Honours ==
Excelsior Roubaix

- Coupe de France
  - Champions: 1933
