= André Chauvel =

French footballer (1909–1973)

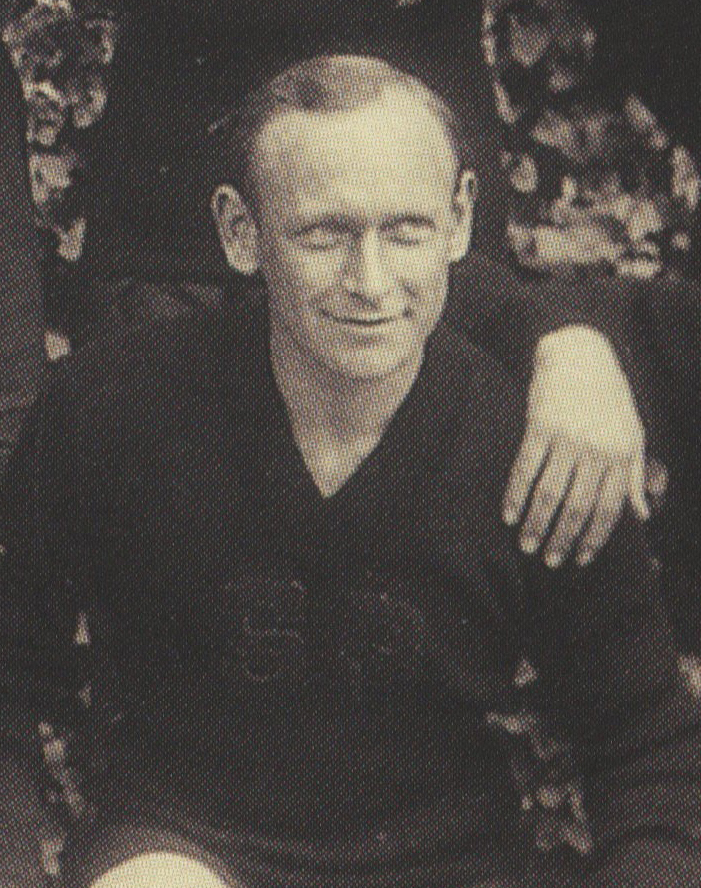

Personal information
- Full name: André Julien Guy Louis Chauvel
- Date of birth: 29 July 1909
- Place of birth: Lamballe, France
- Date of death: 24 January 1973 (aged 63)
- Place of death: Blain, Loire-Atlantique, France
- Height: 1.74 m (5 ft 9 in)
- Position: Forward

Senior career*
Years	Team	Apps	(Gls)
1932–1933	RC Roubaix		
1933–1936	Rennes		
1936–1937	Le Havre		
1939	AC Chapelain		
- * Club domestic league appearances and goals

André Julien Guy Louis Chauvel (29 July 1909 – 24 January 1973) was a French footballer who played as a forward for RC Roubaix and Rennes in the 1930s.

== Career ==
Born in the Brittany town of Lamballe on 29 July 1909, Chauvel began his football career at RC Roubaix in 1932, aged 23. Together with William Hewitt, Edmond Leveugle, and Georges Verriest, he was a member of the Roubaix team that reached the 1933 Coupe de France final, which ended in a 3–1 loss to Excelsior. The following day, the journalists of the French newspaper Le Miroir des sports stated that he was "the most prominent man" of Roubaix's forward line, having "put in a considerable and unfortunately in vain effort".

That same year, Chauvel returned to Brittany, where he joined Rennes, with whom he reached the 1935 Coupe de France final in Colombes, which ended in a 3–0 loss to Olympique de Marseille. Rennes scored from a free-kick, but Chauvel was offside, which caused the referee Lucien Leclercq to disallowed it. He stayed at Rennes for three years, from 1933 until 1936, when he moved to Ligue 2 team Le Havre, where he retired in 1937, aged 28. In total, he scored 29 goals in 78 Ligue 1 matches.

In 1939, Chauvel briefly played for AC Chapelain, a team based in La Chapelle-sur-Erdre.

== Death ==
Chauvel died in Blain, Loire-Atlantique on 24 January 1973, at the age of 63.

== Honours ==
RC Roubaix

- Coupe de France
  - Runner-up: 1933

Rennes

- Coupe de France
  - Runner-up: 1935
