= 1932 Coupe de France final =

- Event: 1931–32 Coupe de France
Cannes	RC Roubaix
1	0
- Date: 24 April 1932
- Venue: Olympique Yves-du-Manoir, Colombes
- Referee: Louis Raguin
- Attendance: 36,143

The 1932 Coupe de France final was a football match held at Stade Olympique Yves-du-Manoir, Colombes on April 24, 1932, that saw AS Cannes defeat RC Roubaix 1–0 thanks to a goal by Louis Cler.

== Match details ==
24 April 1932

Cannes	1–0	RC Roubaix
Cler 83'

Stade Olympique Yves-du-Manoir, Colombes
Attendance: 36,143
Referee: Louis Raguin

GK	(France) Francis Roux
DF	(France) Maurice Tourniaire
DF	(France) Jean Vigouroux
DF	(France) Joseph Beraudo
DF	(England) Stanley Hillier
MF	(France) Louis Cler (c)
MF	(France) Raoul Dutheil
FW	(Scotland) Billy Aitken
FW	(France) Charles Bardot
FW	(France) Pierre Fecchino
FW	(France) Marius Besson
Manager:
(Scotland) Billy Aitken Assistant Referees: Fourth Official:

GK	(France) François Encontre
DF	(France) Jules Cottenier
DF	(France) Eugène Mathoré
DF	(France) Marcel Lechanteux
DF	(France) Georges Verriest
MF	(France) Emile Kramarik
MF	(France) William Hewitt (c)
FW	(France) Ernest Depoers
FW	(France) Edmond Leveugle
FW	(France) Jules Cossement
FW	(France) Gonce
Manager:
?

== See also ==
- 1931–32 Coupe de France
