= Maurice Tourniaire =

French footballer (1910–1981)

Personal information
- Date of birth: 30 May 1910
- Place of birth: Montferrat, France
- Date of death: 4 December 1981 (aged 71)
- Place of death: Cannes, France
- Position: Defender

Senior career*
Years	Team	Apps	(Gls)
1929–1936	Cannes		
- * Club domestic league appearances and goals

Maurice Tourniaire (30 May 1910 – 4 December 1981) was a French footballer who played as a midfielder for Cannes in the early 1930s.

== Career ==
Born on 30 May 1910 in Montferrat, Tourniaire began his football career at AS Cannes, making his debut with the first team in the 1929–30 season, aged 19. Described as "powerful, well-balanced, possessing good technique and very safe clearances", he earned at least two caps with the French military team, as well as a few with the South-East selection.

Together with Louis Cler, Billy Aitken, and Charles Bardot, he was a member of the great Cannes team of the early 1930s, which won the Coupe de France in 1932, beating RC Roubaix 1–0 in the final, and reached the final of the inaugural edition of the French professional league, in which he scored a late equaliser during a corner in an eventual 4–3 loss to Olympique Lillois. In the 1932–33 season, he formed a strong defensive partnership with the Hungarian international János Nagy, which briefly became one of the most renowned backlines in France.

Tourniaire stayed at Cannes for seven years, from 1929 until 1936.

== Death ==
Tourniaire died in Cannes on 4 December 1981, at the age of 71.

== Honours ==
Cannes

- Coupe de France: 1932
- Ligue 1 runner-up: 1932–33
