= Jules Cottenier =

French footballer (1904–1995)

Personal information
- Date of birth: 10 October 1904
- Place of birth: Częstochowa, Poland
- Date of death: 29 June 1995 (aged 90)
- Place of death: Tournai, Belgium
- Position: Defender

Senior career*
Years	Team	Apps	(Gls)
1931–1935	RC Roubaix		

International career
1932–1934	France	4	(0)
- * Club domestic league appearances and goals

Jules Cottenier (10 October 1904 – 29 June 1995) was a French footballer who played as a defender for RC Roubaix and the French national team in the 1930s.

== Career ==
Born on 10 October 1904 in Częstochowa, Poland, Cottenier began his football career at RC Roubaix in 1931, aged 17. Together with William Hewitt, Edmond Leveugle, and Georges Verriest, he was a member of the Roubaix team that reached back-to-back Coupe de France titles in 1932 and 1933, starting in both finals, which ended in losses to Cannes (1–0) and Excelsior (3–1). The following day, the journalists of the French newspaper Le Miroir des sports stated that following Excelsior's second goal, "even Cottenier himself lost his composure and rushed a little at random".

On 20 March 1932, the 27-year-old Cottenier made his international debut for France in a friendly match against Switzerland at Bern, which ended in a 3–3 draw. In total, he earned four international caps for France between 1932 and 1934, all in friendlies, with the next three ending in victories over Belgium (3–0), Spain (1–0), and the Netherlands (5–4). Against Spain, he came off the bench in the 37th minute to replace Lille's Jules Vandooren, who had sustained an injury to the nose.

== Death ==
Cottenier died in Tournai, Belgium, on 29 June 1995, at the age of 90.

== Honours ==
RC Roubaix

- Coupe de France
  - Runner-up (2): 1932 and 1933
