= List of Ligue 1 clubs =

The following is a list of clubs who have played in Ligue 1 at any time since its foundation for the 1932–33 season to the current season. A total of 74 teams have played in Ligue 1.

== List ==
- As of end of 2024–25 season
- Clubs in bold indicate the 18 clubs participating in the **2025–26 Ligue 1 season**

Rank	Club	Seasons in D1/L1	Number of titles	Best result	First season in D1/L1	Last season in D1/L1	Matches played in D1/L1
1.	(Provence-Alpes-Côte d'Azur) **Marseille**	76	9	1st	1932–33	2024-25	2616
2.	(Aquitaine) Bordeaux	69	6	1st	1945–46	2021–22	2506
3.	(Rhône-Alpes) Saint-Étienne	70	10	1st	1938–39	2024-25	2456
4.	(Brittany) **Rennes**	69	-	3rd	1932–33	2024/25	2374
5.	(Franche-Comté) Sochaux	66	2	1st	1932–33	2013–14	2368
6.	(Rhône-Alpes) **Lyon**	68	7	1st	1945–46	2024-25	2400
7.	**Monaco**	67	8	1st	1953–54	2024–25	2370
8.	(Provence-Alpes-Côte d'Azur) **Nice**	67	4	1st	1932–33	2024–25	2342
9.	(Nord-Pas-de-Calais) **Lille**	66	4	1st	1944–45	2024–25	2328
10.	(Lorraine) **Metz**	64	-	2nd	1932–33	2025–26	2184
11.	(Alsace) **Strasbourg**	65	1	1st	1934–35	2024–25	2233
12.	(Nord-Pas-de-Calais) **Lens**	63	1	1st	1937–38	2024–25	2234
13.	(Pays de la Loire) **Nantes**	57	8	1st	1963–64	2024–25	2044
14.	(Île-de-France) **Paris Saint-Germain**	53	13	1st	1971–72	2024–25	1869
15.	(Languedoc-Roussillon) Montpellier	44	1	1st	1932–33	2024–25	1476
16.	(Champagne-Ardenne) Reims	42	6	1st	1945–46	2024–25	1382
–	(Languedoc-Roussillon) Nîmes	40	-	2nd	1932–33	2020–21	1312
18.	(Corsica) Bastia	34	-	3rd	1968–69	2016–17	1264
–	(Midi-Pyrénées) **Toulouse**	36	-	3rd	1982–83	2024–25	1232
20.	(Nord-Pas-de-Calais) Valenciennes	33	-	3rd	1935–36	2013–14	1214
–	(Burgundy) **Auxerre**	34	1	1st	1980–81	2024–25	1234
22.	(Pays de la Loire) **Angers**	32	-	3rd	1956–57	2022–23	1128
23.	(Île-de-France) RC Paris	30	1	1st	1932–33	1989–90	1020
–	(Lorraine) Nancy	30	-	4th	1970–71	2016–17	1132
25.	(Upper Normandy) **Le Havre**	25	-	3rd	1938–39	2024–25	872
–	(Champagne-Ardenne) Sedan	23	-	3rd	1955–56	2006–07	834
27.	(Provence-Alpes-Côte d'Azur) Cannes	22	-	2nd	1932–33	1997–98	749
28.	(Midi-Pyrénées) Toulouse (1937)	19	-	2nd	1946–47	1966–67	678
–	(Upper Normandy) Rouen	19	-	4th	1936–37	1984–85	678
–	(Champagne-Ardenne) Troyes	19	-	7th	1954–55	2022–23	702
31.	(Lower Normandy) Caen	18	-	5th	1988–89	2018–19	684
–	(Brittany) **Brest**	20	-	3rd	1979–80	2024–25	636
33.	(Brittany) **Lorient**	18	-	7th	1998–99	2025–26	634
34.	(Languedoc-Roussillon) Sète	16	2	1st	1932–33	1953–54	504
–	(Île-de-France) Red Star	16	-	7th	1932–33	1974–75	560
36.	(Lorraine) FC Nancy	15	-	4th	1946–47	1962–63	530
–	(Île-de-France) Stade Français	15	-	5th	1946–47	1966–67	538
38.	(Corsica) Ajaccio	14	-	6th	1967–68	2022–23	524
39.	(Brittany) Guingamp	13	-	7th	1995–96	2018–19	482
–	(Pays de la Loire) Laval	13	-	5th	1976–77	1988–89	494
41.	(Provence-Alpes-Côte d'Azur) Toulon	12	-	5th	1958–59	1992–93	452
42.	(Nord-Pas-de-Calais) Roubaix-Tourcoing	10	1	1st	1945–46	1954–55	344
43.	(Nord-Pas-de-Calais) Olympique Lillois	7	1	1st	1932–33	1938–39	194
–	(Nord-Pas-de-Calais) Fives	7	-	2nd	1932–33	1938–39	194
–	(Nord-Pas-de-Calais) Excelsior Roubaix	7	-	5th	1932–33	1938–39	194
–	(Provence-Alpes-Côte d'Azur) Antibes	7	-	7th	1932–33	1938–39	194
47.	(Alsace) Mulhouse	6	-	6th	1932–33	1989–90	184
–	(Pays de la Loire) Le Mans	6	-	9th	2003–04	2009–10	208
–	(Languedoc-Roussillon) Alès	6	-	10th	1932–33	1958–59	184
–	(Burgundy) Dijon	6	-	11th	2011–12	2020–21	180
51.	(Rhône-Alpes) Evian	4	-	9th	2011–12	2014–15	148
–	(Île-de-France) **Paris FC**	4	-	12th	1972–73	2025–26	148
–	(Centre-Val de Loire) Tours	4	-	11th	1980–81	1984–85	152
–	(Rhône-Alpes) Grenoble	4	-	13th	1960–61	2009–10	152
55.	(Poitou-Charentes) Angoulême	3	-	4th	1969–70	1971–72	110
–	(Nord-Pas-de-Calais) RC Roubaix	3	-	8th	1936–37	1938–39	90
–	(Auvergne) Clermont	3	-	8th	2021–22	2023–24	76
–	(Limousin) Limoges	3	-	10th	1958–59	1960–61	114
–	(Provence-Alpes-Côte d'Azur) Martigues	3	-	11th	1993–94	1995–96	114
–	(Nord-Pas-de-Calais) Amiens	3	-	13th	2017–18	2019–20	104
61.	(Île-de-France) CA Paris	2	-	5th	1932–33	1933–34	44
62.	(Île-de-France) Club Français	1	-	8th	1932–33	1932–33	18
–	(Provence-Alpes-Côte d'Azur) Hyères	1	-	9th	1932–33	1932–33	18
–	(Alsace) Colmar	1	-	11th	1948–49	1948–49	34
–	(Centre-Val de Loire) Châteauroux	1	-	17th	1997–98	1997–98	34
–	(Languedoc-Roussillon) Béziers	1	-	18th	1957–58	1957–58	34
–	(Poitou-Charentes) Niort	1	-	18th	1987–88	1987–88	38
–	(Burgundy) Gueugnon	1	-	18th	1995–96	1995–96	38
–	(Nord-Pas-de-Calais) Boulogne	1	-	19th	2009–10	2009–10	38
–	(Corsica) Gazélec Ajaccio	1	-	19th	2015–16	2015–16	38
–	(Provence-Alpes-Côte d'Azur) Aix	1	-	20th	1967–68	1967–68	38
–	(Provence-Alpes-Côte d'Azur) Arles-Avignon	1	-	20th	2010–11	2010–11	38
–	(Provence-Alpes-Côte d'Azur) Avignon	1	-	20th	1975–76	1975–76	38
–	(Provence-Alpes-Côte d'Azur) Istres	1	-	20th	2004–05	2004–05	38
