= Pierre Fecchino =

French footballer (1907–1987)

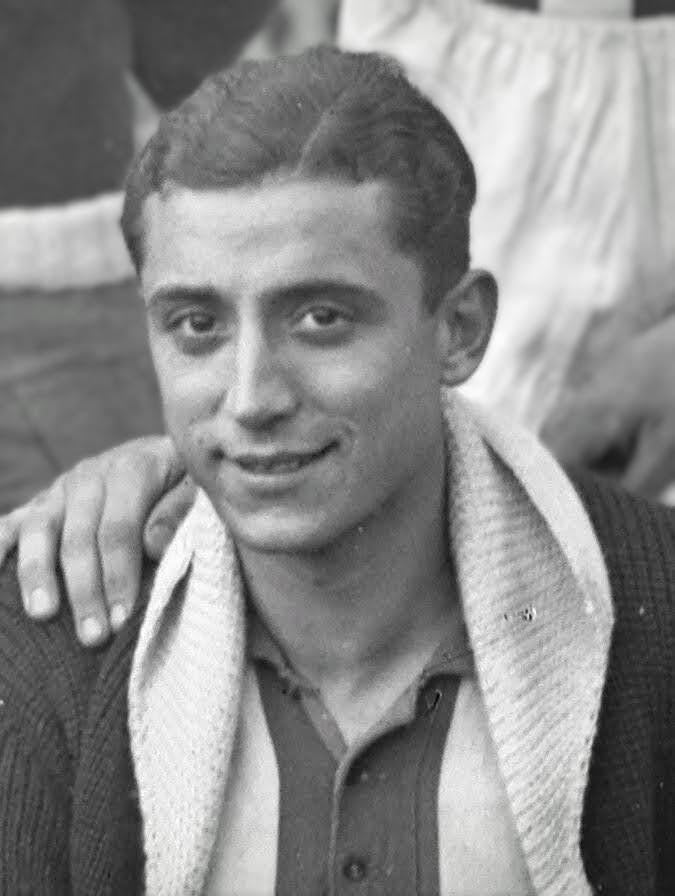
- Fecchino in 1931

Personal information
- Date of birth: 31 May 1907
- Place of birth: Antibes, France
- Date of death: 22 January 1987 (aged 79)
- Place of death: Antibes, France
- Height: 1.74 m (5 ft 9 in)
- Position: Forward

Senior career*
Years	Team	Apps	(Gls)
1929–1934	Cannes		
1934–1938	Antibes		
1938–1939	Nice		
- * Club domestic league appearances and goals

Pierre Fecchino (31 May 1907 – 22 January 1987) was a French footballer who played as a forward for Cannes in the early 1930s.

== Career ==
Born on 31 May 1907 in Antibes, Fecchino began his career at AS Cannes in 1929, aged 22. In 1933, he was described by the local press as "one of the best French goal-getters; tireless worker".

Together with Louis Cler, Billy Aitken, and Charles Bardot, Fecchino was a member of the great Cannes team of the early 1930s, which won the Coupe de France in 1932, beating RC Roubaix 1–0 in the final, and achieved a runner-up finish in the inaugural edition of the French professional league, losing the final 4–3 to Olympique Lillois. In the Cup final, he delivered the assist for the only goal of the match scored by Louis Cler, while in the championship final, he took advantage of a goalkeeping mistake to "run up to the abandoned goal, all joyful, to score an easy goal in the 18th minute; however, Cannes ended up losing.

Fecchino stayed at Cannes for five years, from 1929 until 1934, when he joined his hometown club Antibes, with whom he played for four years, until 1938, when he signed for Ligue 2 side Nice. Having scored a total 36 goals in 137 Ligue 1 matches, he went on to score 10 goals in 36 matches in his first season in Ligue 2, but the outbreak of World War II put an end to his career.

== Death ==
Fecchino died in Antibes on 22 January 1987, at the age of 79.

== Honours ==
AS Cannes

- Coupe de France
  - Champions: 1932
- Ligue 1
  - Runner-up: 1932–33
