= William Hewitt (footballer) =

French footballer

Personal information
- Position: Defender

Senior career*
Years	Team	Apps	(Gls)
1923–1926	Sète		
1928–1934	RC Roubaix		
- * Club domestic league appearances and goals

William Hewitt was a French footballer who played as a defender for Sète and RC Roubaix between 1923 and 1934.

== Career ==
Hewitt began his football career at Sète in 1923. In his first season there, together with Billy Cornelius, Louis Cazal, and Victor Gibson, he helped the club reach the 1924 Coupe de France final, which ended in a 3–2 loss to Olympique de Marseille. The following day, the journalists of the French newspaper L'Auto (currently L'Équipe) stated that he only played well after half-time.

Hewitt later joined RC Roubaix, where, together with Edmond Leveugle, Jules Cottenier, and Georges Verriest, he helped the team reach back-to-back Coupe de France titles in 1932 and 1933, starting in both finals, which ended in losses to Cannes (1–0) and Excelsior (3–1), thus becoming one of the few players to have lost three Coupe de France finals. After the 1932 final, the journalists of L'Auto stated that he was "decidedly out of form", as he kicked two corner wides and later missed a chance in which he "only had to push the ball to score, but he curled the ball over the bar". After the 1933 final, he was harshly criticized by the journalists of Le Miroir des sports, who stated that "Hewitt seemed to be playing as if in a dream, a bad dream", referring to his mistake that allowed Julien Bugé to score.

== Honours ==
FC Sète 34

- Coupe de France runner-up: 1924

RC Roubaix

- Coupe de France runner-up: 1932, 1933
