= Georges Winckelmans =

French footballer manager (1910–1991)

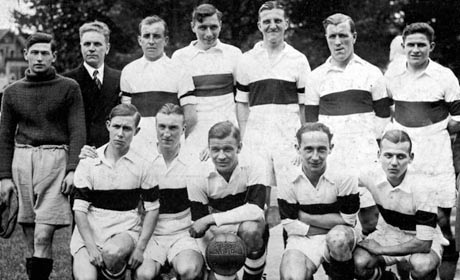
- Winckelmans (lower row, 1st from right [1]) with the championship team in 1933.

Personal information
- Date of birth: 14 July 1910
- Place of birth: Lambersart (Nord), France
- Date of death: 13 November 1991 (aged 81)
- Place of death: Armentières, France
- Height: 1.77 m (5 ft 9 1/2 in)
- Positions: Midfielder; outside right; striker

Senior career*
Years	Team	Apps	(Gls)
1932–1935	Lille		
1935–1937	RC Roubaix		
1937–1939	Lille		

Managerial career
- 1941–1943: Lille
- 1947–1948: CO Roubaix-Tourcoing
- 1948–1950: Montpellier
- * Club domestic league appearances and goals

Georges Fernand Olivier Winckelmans (14 July 1910 – 13 November 1991) was a French footballer and coach. He was born in Lambersart (Nord).

== Biography ==
Winckelmans played as a midfielder or outside right at the start of the professional era of Olympique Lillois. He participated in the final of the first French Championship on 14 May 1933 at Colombes (O. Lillois-AS Cannes, 4-3). He scored two goals for the nordistes including the winner in the 86th minute. In 1935, he left to play at RC Roubaix. The roubaisien club were vice-champions of Division 2 in 1936 and joined the elite the following season.

Winckelmans returned to Olympique Lillois in 1937 where he finished his playing career with the start of the war which stopped all club activities. OL merged in 1941 with their neighbour Iris Club Lillois to form OIC Lille. Winckelmans became coach of this new club, until 1943. After the war he continued his coaching career, at CO Roubaix-Tourcoing in 1947-1948, and then to SO Montpellier, from 1948 to 1950.

== Honours ==
- Champion of France in 1933 with Olympique Lillois
- Vice-champion of France D2 in 1936 with RC Roubaix
