= Edmond Leveugle =

French footballer

Personal information
- Date of birth: 22 November 1904
- Place of birth: Tourcoing, France
- Date of death: 29 January 1986 (aged 81)
- Place of death: Tournai, Belgium
- Position: Forward

Senior career*
Years	Team	Apps	(Gls)
1922–1934	RC Roubaix		
1934–1935	US Tourquennoise		

International career
1926	France	1	(1)
- * Club domestic league appearances and goals

Edmond Leveugle (22 November 1904 – 29 January 1986) was a French footballer who played as a forward for RC Roubaix and the French national team in the 1920s.

== Career ==
Born on 22 November 1904 in Tourcoing, Leveugle began his football career at RC Roubaix in 1922, aged 18, with whom he played for over a decade, until 1934, and together with Georges Verriest, Gérard Isbecque, and Raymond Dubly, he helped Roubaix win the Division d'Honneur of the 1922–23 Northern Football League with 38 points, two more than runner-up Olympique Lillois.

On 11 April 1926, the 21-year-old Leveugle earned his first (and only) international cap for France in a friendly match against Belgium at Stade Pershing in Paris, scoring his side's third goal via a rebound in a 4–3 victory, thus becoming one of the few players to have scored for France on their debut. The following day, the journalists of French newspaper L'Auto (the future L'Équipe) stated that "he follows well, which earned him the third French goal, but he is not ready to be a center forward for a national team".

Together with William Hewitt, Jules Cottenier, and Verriest, he was a member of the Roubaix team that reached back-to-back Coupe de France titles in 1932 and 1933, starting in both finals, which ended in losses to Cannes (1–0) and Excelsior (3–1). In the semifinals of the 1933 tournament, he scored a goal against the defending champions Cannes to help his side to a 2–0 win.

In 1934, Leveugle left Roubaix to join his hometown club US Tourquennoise, with whom he played for a single season, as he then retired in 1935.

== Death ==
Leveugle died in Tournai, Belgium, on 29 January 1986, at the age of 81.

== Honours ==
RC Roubaix

- DH Northern Football League: 1922–23
