= Raymond Wattine =

French footballer

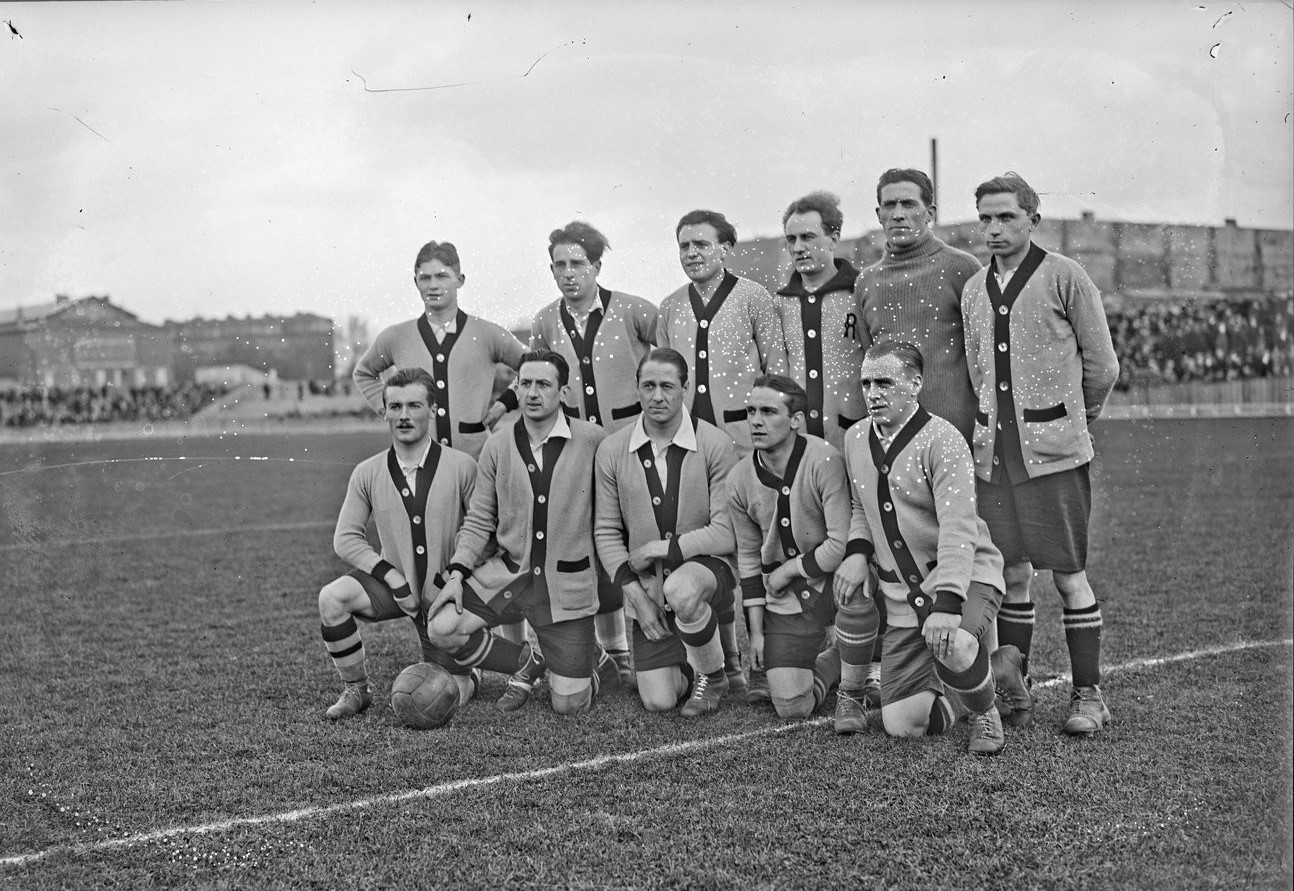
- Wattine (on one knee, in the center) in 1923

Personal information
- Full name: Raymond Jules Joseph Wattine
- Date of birth: 23 August 1895
- Place of birth: Roncq, France
- Date of death: 7 May 1937 (aged 41)
- Place of death: Arbonne, France
- Position: Midfielder

Senior career*
Years	Team	Apps	(Gls)
1920–1923	RC Roubaix		

International career
1923	France	1	(0)
- * Club domestic league appearances and goals

Raymond Jules Joseph Wattine (23 August 1895 – 7 May 1937) was a French footballer who played as a midfielder for RC Roubaix and the French national team in the early 1920s.

== Playing career ==
Born in Roncq on 23 August 1895, Wattine played at RC Roubaix between 1920 and 1923, and together with Georges Verriest, Gérard Isbecque, and Raymond Dubly, he helped Roubaix return to its pre-war glory by winning the Division d'Honneur of the 1922–23 Northern Football League, doing so with 38 points, two more than runner-up Olympique Lillois. All of the aforementioned players, including Wattine, spent their entire careers at Roubaix.

On 25 February 1923, the 27-year-old Wattine earned his first (and only) international cap for France in a friendly match against Belgium at Forest, which ended in a 4–1 loss. He played the entire match, alongside fellow club teammates Isbecque and Dubly, the latter being the team's captain. In doing so, Wattine and Isbecque became only the fifth and sixth RC Roubaix players to represent the French national team, after Émile Sartorius, Maurice Vandendriessche, Dubly, and Emile Dusart.

== Later life and death ==
One of his cousins, Louis-Marie Bossut, an officer who died during World War I, now has a statue in his honor in Roubaix in the Barbieux park. The day before his death, Bossut spoke of a command pennant, blessed at the Sacré Cœur, which was later present on the tanks of his brother Pierre Bossut, and then of Lieutenant Moello, whose deputy chief was Wattine.

He was also a renowned industrialist and the honorary president of RC Roubaix. Wattine died in Arbonne on 7 May 1937, at the age of 41.

== Legacy ==
Wattine served as the model for the "Monument to the death of the Racing Club of Roubaix", near the Dubrulle-Verriest stadium.

== Honours ==
RC Roubaix

- DH Northern Football League:
  - Champions (1): 1922–23
