= Stade Amédée-Prouvost =

20th-century Stadium

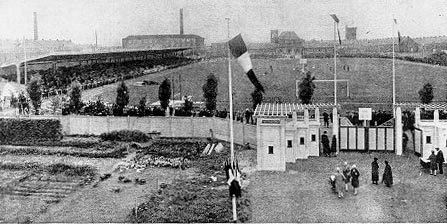
- View of the stadium in 1927

- Location within France
- Address: rue Charles Castermant, Wattrelos
- Coordinates: 50.704°N 3.195°E

Construction
- Built: 1923
- Closed: 1977

Tenants
- FC Roubaix (1923-1929); Excelsior de Roubaix (1929-1945); CO Roubaix-Tourcoing (1945-1970)

The Stade Amédée-Prouvost is a former stadium in Wattrelos in the Nord department. It was built in 1923.

It hosted the matches of the Excelsior Roubaix from 1928 to 1945 and the Olympic Club Roubaix-Tourcoing from 1945 to 1970.

== History ==
In 1923, Albert Prouvost, a sponsor and patron of FC Roubaix, decided to and financed the construction of a new stadium with 2,000 covered seats, which hosted the football team of the club, but also tennis, bocce, gymnastics, table tennis and basketball. Officially opened in September 1927, the Stade Amédée-Prouvost then becomes one of the best enclosures in the region.

In 1929, the stadium was the scene of the tumultuous arrival of the Paris-Roubaix cycling race: with a cendree track it turns out that the stadium is not at all suited to cycling. In the final sprint involving three competitors, the big favorite, Belgian Georges Ronsse, slips and breaks his wheel while he is in the lead, leaving the victory to his compatriot Charles Meunier. Dissatisfied, the public invades the track and the sprint for fourth place is canceled. The press was very critical, so that the race was not run there again.

That same year, the Roubaix FC merged with Excelsior Tourcoing to become the Excelsior Roubaix. The new club opts for Amédée-Prouvost stadium for his football and athletics teams. The club achieved significant results in the Coupe de France with a quarter-final in 1931, losing to Club français, eventual winners of the competition, then the club had a victory in 1933. In 1935 and 1936, two new grandstands, with 9000 covered seats and 7,000 standing places (not covered), were opened.

In 1945, Excelsior merges with the RC Roubaix and Tourcoing Union Sportive to form Olympic Club Roubaix-Tourcoing, whose president is Albert Prouvost. The new club gradually became the resident club of the stadium. The stadium was in the center of a large urban center with canteen and facilities of Prouvost establishments. The city welcomed workers and their families. The CORT had a thunderous debut in the championship of France: 3rd in the first division in 1946, it won the national title in 1947. The club is unfortunately relegated to the second division in 1955 after a poor season.

After another relegation in 1963, the professional status of the club was abandoned. In 1966 the premier covered gallery is closed. The club finally ceased operations June 15, 1970, when it had been in the France Amateurs Championship, the third tier of French football. Excelsior Roubaix Athletic Club took over in stride.

In 1977, fallen to DH, the club merged with Sporting Club de Roubaix and its first team abandons the stadium Amédée Prouvost for Roubaix Velodrome. In 1984 the club finally files for bankruptcy.

In 2011, all that remains of the stadium instead a wasteland.

In 2012, the location of Stade Amedee Prouvost was replaced by a sports arena dedicated to young people. Many cultural events aimed to develop the Lille culture are organized in "la boite à musique" in the same street that bears the name of the stadium.
