= Lietaer =

Lietaer is a surname. Notable people with the surname include:

- Bernard Lietaer (1942–2019), Belgian civil engineer, economist, writer, and academic
- Eliot Lietaer (born 1990), Belgian cyclist
- Noël Liétaer (1908–1941), French footballer
