= Cler =

Cler is a Spanish surname. Notable people with the surname include:

- Barthélemy de Cler (c. 1420 – c. 1470), an Early Netherlandish artist who worked in France as a painter and manuscript illuminator
- Damien Cler (born 1983), French rugby forward
- Louis Cler (1905–1950), French footballer
- Tim de Cler (born 1978), Dutch former professional footballer
