= Julien Buge =

French footballer (1913-1940)

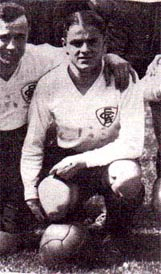
- Buge during his career

Personal information
- Full name: Julien Pierre Isidore Buge
- Date of birth: 18 February 1913
- Place of birth: Paris, France
- Date of death: 18 May 1940 (aged 27)
- Place of death: Inor, France
- Position: Forward

Senior career*
Years	Team	Apps	(Gls)
1932–1935	Excelsior Roubaix	34	(9)
1935–1937	Amiens	21	(3)
1937–1938	Excelsior Roubaix	2	(1)
- * Club domestic league appearances and goals

Julien Pierre Isidore Buge (18 February 1913 – 18 May 1940) was a French professional footballer who played as a forward in Division 1 for Excelsior Roubaix and Division 2 for Amiens.

== Personal life ==
Buge's father was killed serving during the First World War. Buge himself served in the 246th Infantry Regiment of the French Army during the Second World War. He was killed in action in Meuse on 18 May 1940. His son, also named Julien, would become a professional footballer who played for CO Roubaix-Tourcoing.
