= John Westwood =

John Westwood may refer to:

== Football ==
- John Portsmouth Football Club Westwood (born 1963), English football supporter
- John Westwood (footballer) (1886-1917), pre-First World War English footballer
- Johnny Weston, footballer in 1945–46 Colchester United F.C. season
- John Westwood (1950s footballer) from List of foreign Ligue 1 players: E

== Others ==
- John Obadiah Westwood (1805–1893), English entomologist and archaeologist
- John Westwood (politician), American state representative in Utah
- John Westwood (entrepreneur), subject of painting by Joshua Johnson
