= Lucien Troupel =

French footballer (1919–1993)

Personal information
- Date of birth: 11 January 1919
- Place of birth: Paris, France
- Date of death: 19 May 1993 (aged 74)
- Place of death: La Varenne-Saint-Hilaire, France
- Position: Striker

Youth career
- JS Puteaux
- CO Billancourt
- RC Paris
- Toulon
- Brive

Senior career*
Years	Team	Apps	(Gls)
1940–1942	Marseille		
1942–1943	Brive		
1943–1944	EF Marseille-Provence		
1944–1948	Besançon		

Managerial career
- 1948–1952: Toulon
- 1952–1955: Cannes
- 1955–1959: Lyon
- 1959–1962: Marseille
- 1965–1966: Sedan
- 1967–1970: Bataillon Joinville
- 1972–1973: France (military team)
- 1973–1980: Châteauroux
- * Club domestic league appearances and goals

Lucien Troupel (11 January 1919 – 19 May 1993) was a French football player and manager. He played as a striker for Marseille, Brive, EF Marseille-Provence and Besançon. He coached Toulon, Cannes, Lyon, Marseille, Sedan, Bataillon Joinville, France (military team) and Châteauroux.
