= Oumar Sidibé (footballer, born 2001) =

French footballer

Personal information
- Date of birth: 12 February 2001 (age 25)
- Place of birth: France
- Height: 1.76 m (5 ft 9 in)
- Position: Winger

Team information
- Current team: Cannes

Youth career
- 2012–2019: Paris 13 Atletico
- 2019–2021: Valenciennes

Senior career*
| Years | Team | Apps | (Gls) |
| 2020–2022 | Valenciennes B | 19 | (1) |
| 2021–2022 | Valenciennes | 3 | (0) |
| 2022–2023 | Paris 13 Atletico | 27 | (3) |
| 2023–2024 | Villefranche | 29 | (2) |
| 2024–2026 | Nancy | 42 | (3) |
| 2026 | → Paris 13 Atletico (loan) | 13 | (1) |
| 2026– | Cannes | 0 | (0) |
- * Club domestic league appearances and goals as of 5 September 2026

Oumar Sidibé (born 12 February 2001) is a French professional footballer who plays as a winger for Ligue 3 club Cannes.

== Career ==
A youth product of Paris 13 Atletico, Sidibé moved to Valenciennes in 2019. He made his professional debut for the club in a 1–0 Ligue 2 win over Grenoble on 20 November 2021.

On 6 July 2022, Sidibé returned to Paris 13 Atletico.

== Honours ==
Nancy

- Championnat National: 2024–25
