= Louis Cler =

French footballer (1907–1987)

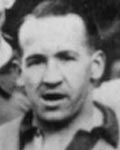
- Cler

Personal information
- Date of birth: 30 December 1905
- Place of birth: Saint-Raphaël, France
- Date of death: 15 December 1950 (aged 44)
- Place of death: Villejuif, France
- Height: 1.64 m (5 ft 5 in)
- Position: Midfielder

Senior career*
Years	Team	Apps	(Gls)
1927–1938	Cannes		
1938–1939	Antibes		
- * Club domestic league appearances and goals

Louis Cler (30 December 1905 – 15 December 1950) was a French footballer who played as a midfielder for Cannes in the early 1930s.

== Career ==
Born on 30 December 1905 in Saint-Raphaël, Cler joined the ranks of AS Cannes in 1919, aged 14, and made his debut with the first team around 1926. In 1933, he was described by the local press as having "remarkable qualities of skill and relaxation", which earned him several caps for both France B and the South-East selection.

Cler went on to established himself as the team's captain, playing a crucial role, together with Pierre Fecchino, Billy Aitken, and Charles Bardot, in helping Cannes win the Coupe de France in 1932, scoring the only goal of the final to seal a 1–0 victory over RC Roubaix, and then achieve a runner-up finish in the inaugural edition of the French professional league, losing the final 4–3 to Olympique Lillois. The following day, the journalists of the French newspaper L'Auto (currently L'Équipe) stated that he "played a dazzling game, giving his all".

1932 Coupe de France final

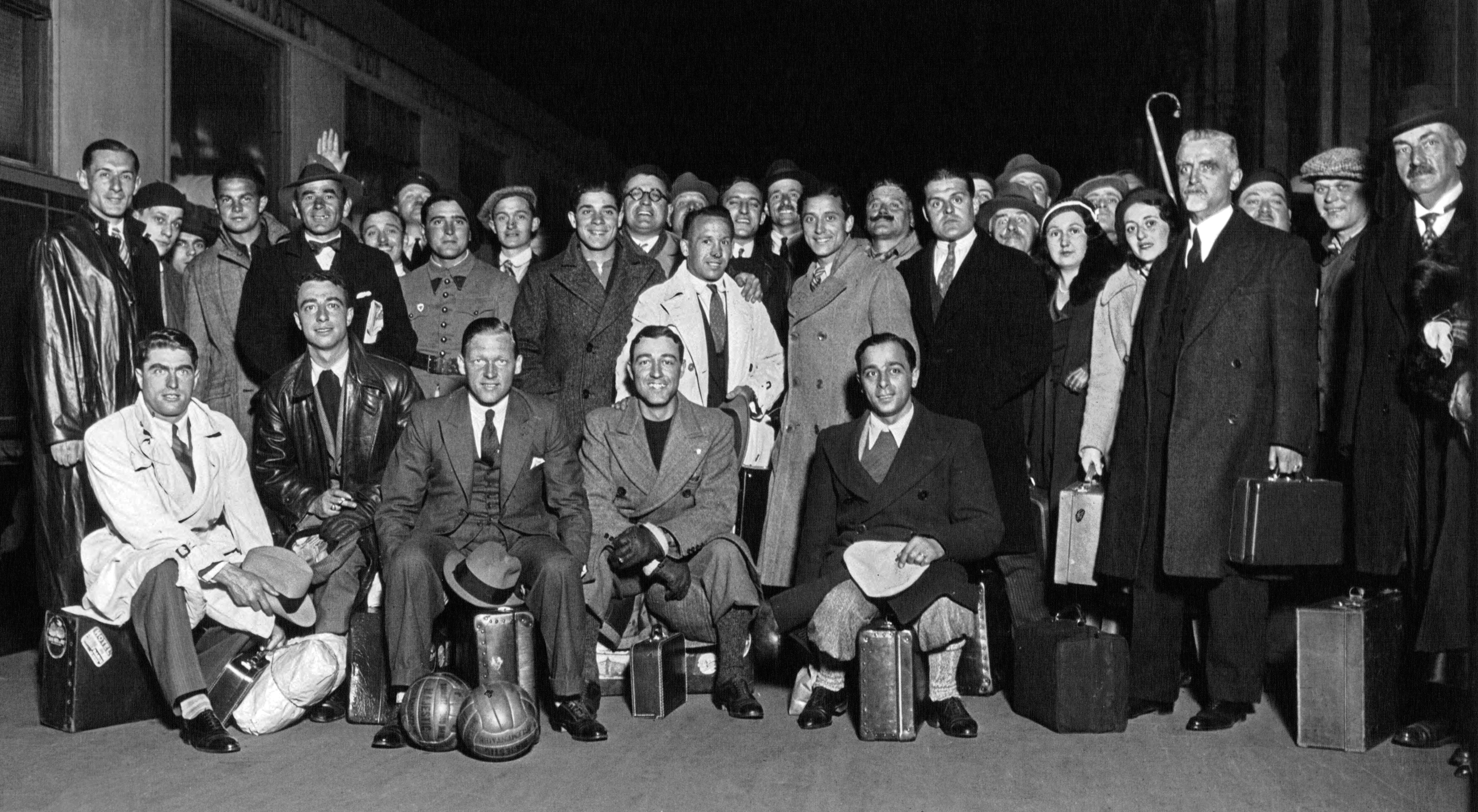
The Cannes group on its way to the Cup final.

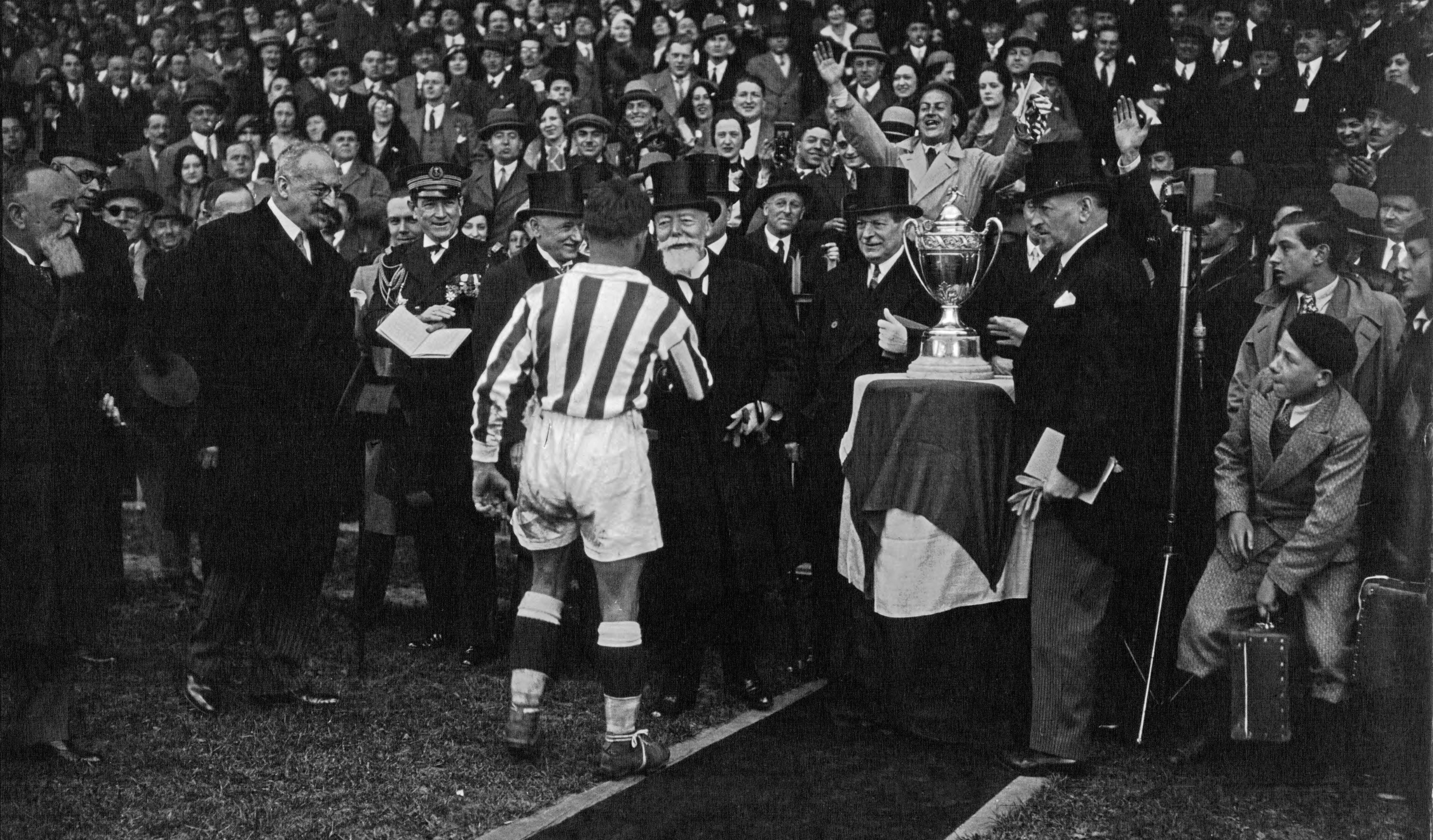
Louis Cler shaking hands with Paul Doumer after winning the final.

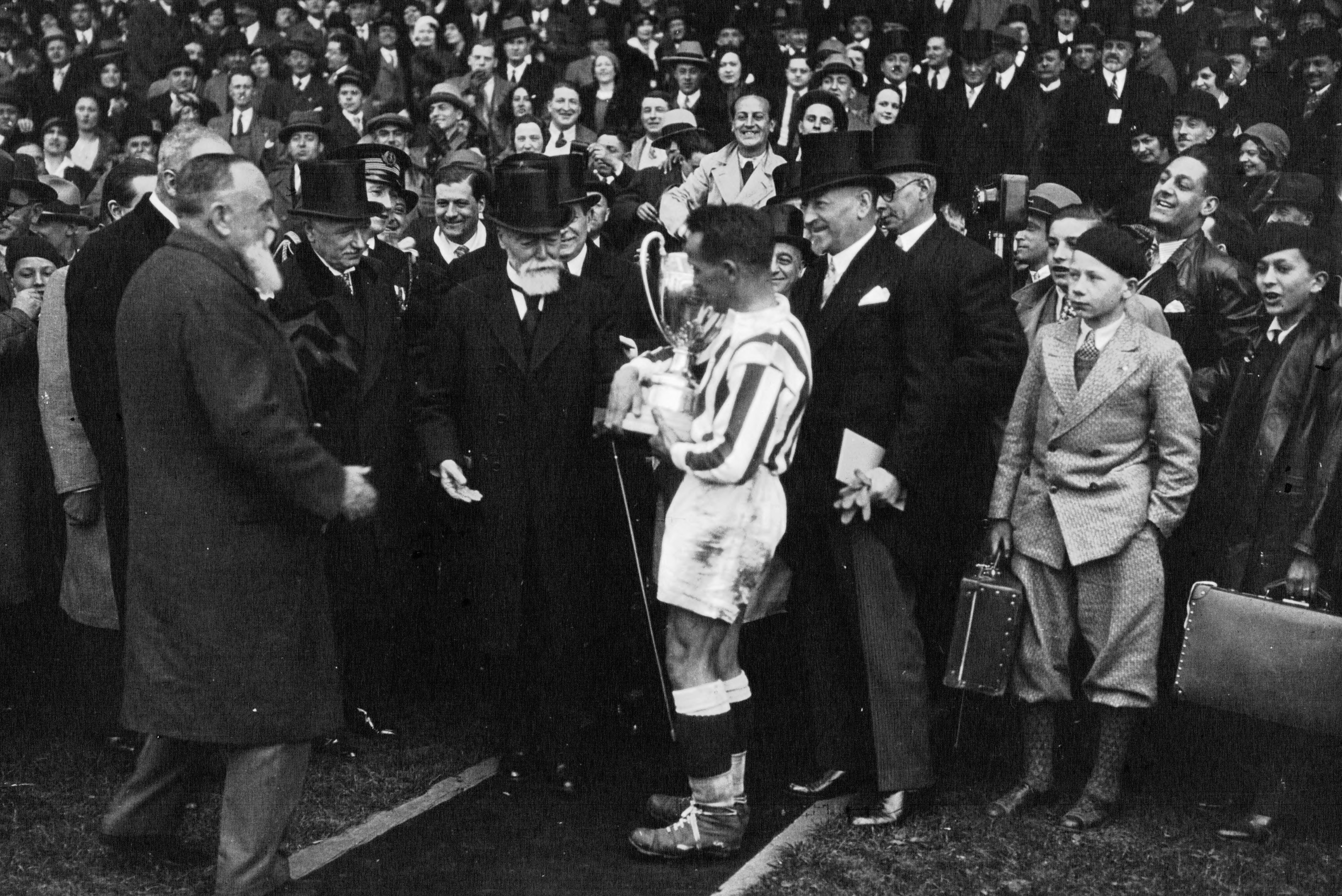
Louis Cler carrying the Coupe de France trophy.

Cler stayed at Cannes for over a decade, from 1927 until 1938, when he joined Antibes, where he retired in 1939, aged 34. In total, he scored 12 goals in 163 Ligue 1 matches.

== Later life and death ==
During the Second World War, Cler was taken prisoner and remained as such for nearly the entire conflict. Weakened upon his return, he eventually fell seriously ill, after which he was financially supported by his former teammates, who organized a tribute match between AS Cannes and OGC Nice in December 1950, with the proceeds being donated to him. A few days later, however, he died at the Villejuif hospital on 15 December 1950, aged 44.

== Honours ==
AS Cannes

- Coupe de France
  - Champions: 1932
- Ligue 1
  - Runner-up: 1932–33
