= Marcel Desrousseaux =

French footballer and manager (1907–1974)

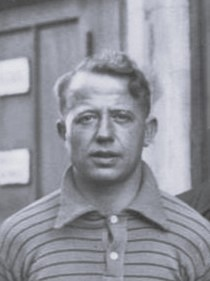

Personal information
- Full name: Marcel Arthur Desrousseaux
- Date of birth: 13 December 1907
- Place of birth: Tourcoing, France
- Date of death: 3 July 1974 (aged 66)
- Place of death: Roubaix, France
- Position: Midfielder

Senior career*
Years	Team	Apps	(Gls)
1926–1928	US Tourcoing		
1928–1932	CA Messin		
1932–1933	US Tourcoing		
1933–1944	Excelsior		

International career
1935–1937	France	2	(0)

Managerial career
- 1953–1955: CO Roubaix-Tourcoing
- 1963–1964: CO Roubaix-Tourcoing
- * Club domestic league appearances and goals

Marcel Arthur Desrousseaux (13 December 1907 – 3 July 1974) was a French footballer who played as a midfielder for Excelsior and the French national team in the 1930s.

== Career ==
Born in Tourcoing on 13 December 1907, Desrousseaux began his career at his hometown club US Tourcoing, where, in 1926, at the age of 19, he was already playing as a starter in the quarter-finals of the 1925–26 Coupe de France against Olympique de Marseille, which ended in a 2–4 loss. Two years later, on 28 May 1928, he started in the final of the French Championship, which they lost to Stade Français.

In 1928, Desrousseaux joined CA Messin, with whom he played for four years, until 1932, helping his side win the 1929 and 1931 Lorraine Football League. In 1932, he returned to US Tourcoing, but the following season, he joined Excelsior, with whom he played for over a decade, from 1933 until his retirement in 1944, aged 37.

On 27 October 1935, the 27-year-old Desrousseaux made his international debut for France in a friendly against Switzerland at Geneva, which ended in a 1–2 loss. He had to wait two years for his second (and last) international cap on 10 October 1937, another friendly against Switzerland, helping his side to a 2–1 win at the Parc des Princes. The following day, he was harshly criticized by the journalists of the French newspaper L'Auto (currently known as L'Équipe), who stated that "he completely lacked the required authority to hold the position of center half of a national team, being often deceived and caught off guard", albeit partly because "he was hardly helped by his teammates, who neglected him". The journalists of Match l'Intran, however" described his performance as "commendable", as he "flawlessly fulfilled the role assigned to him", despite making poor passes to the forwards. He was believed to have been the only Desrousseaux who played for France until it was uncovered that Fernand Desrousseaux had worn the French jersey at the 1908 Olympic Games in London.

== Managerial career ==
After retiring, Desrousseaux became a coach, taking over CO Roubaix-Tourcoing in January 1953, a position that he held for two years, until January 1955, being replaced by Jean Baratte. As a manager, he was described in a 1954 Racing club de Strasbourg match programme as "an example of seriousness".

== Death ==
Desrousseaux died in Roubaix on 3 July 1974, at the age of 66.

== Honours ==
CA Messin

- Lorraine Football League
  - Champions (2): 1929 and 1931
