= Pierre Michelin (footballer) =

French footballer (born 1937)

Personal information
- Date of birth: 7 February 1937 (age 89)
- Place of birth: Neuville-en-Ferrain, France
- Height: 1.68 m (5 ft 6 in)
- Positions: Defensive midfielder; defender

Senior career*
Years	Team	Apps	(Gls)
1956–1961	Roubaix-Tourcoing	120	(6)
1961–1964	Sedan	108	(3)
1964–1966	Daring Bruxelles	59	(3)
1966–1969	Lille	99	(4)
Total		386	(16)

International career
1963–1964	France	5	(0)

Managerial career
- 1988–1989: Lille B
- * Club domestic league appearances and goals

Pierre Michelin (born 7 February 1937) is a French former professional footballer who played as a defensive midfielder and defender. He made five appearances for the France national team from 1963 to 1964.

== International career ==
Michelin made his debut for the France national team in a 1–0 loss to Bulgaria on 29 September 1963. He would go on to make four more appearances for France until 1964.

== Managerial career ==
Michelin coached Lille's reserve side in the 1988–89 season.

== Honours ==
Sedan

- Coupe Charles Drago runner-up: 1963
