= Adick Koot =

Dutch former professional footballer (born 1963)

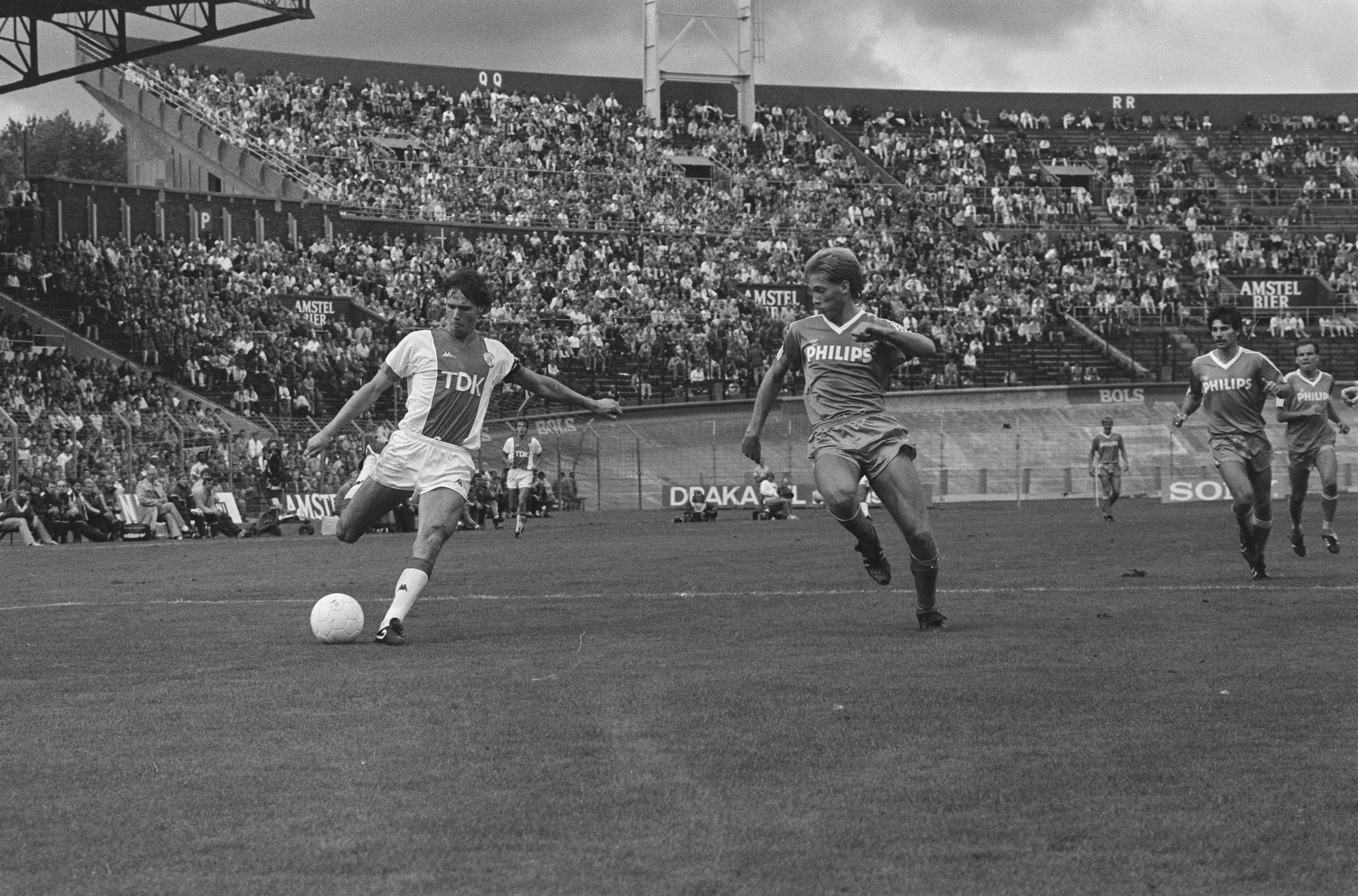

Personal information
- Date of birth: 16 August 1963 (age 63)
- Place of birth: Eindhoven, Netherlands
- Height: 1.85 m (6 ft 1 in)
- Position: Centre back

Youth career
- UDI '19

Senior career*
Years	Team	Apps	(Gls)
1983–1991	PSV	111	(3)
1991–1998	Cannes	194	(5)
1998–1999	Lille	26	(2)
Total		331	(10)

International career
1988–1989	Netherlands	3	(0)

Managerial career
- 1997–1998: Cannes
- * Club domestic league appearances and goals

Adick Koot (born 16 August 1963) is a Dutch former professional footballer who played as a centre-back.

He started his 18-year career with PSV, then spent its remainder in France, mainly at the service of Cannes.

== Club career ==
Born in Eindhoven, Koot joined PSV Eindhoven in 1982 at the age of 18. After only one Eredivisie game in his first two seasons combined, he proceeded to be regularly used as the club won five national championships and three domestic cups.

During his nine years with the PSV, Koot appeared in more than 150 official games. He was an unused substitute in the 1987–88 European Cup final, won against S.L. Benfica on penalties.

In the 1991 summer Koot joined AS Cannes in France, being relegated from Ligue 1 in his first year but gaining immediate promotion back. In the 1997–98 campaign, he acted as player-coach (21 matches, one goal) as the French Riviera team was again relegated; he played in 220 competitive matches during his tenure.

35-year-old Koot signed for another side in Ligue 2, Lille OSC, for 1998–99, only missing on promotion due to goal difference. He retired at the end of the season, and became a sports agent.

== International career ==
Koot gained three caps for Holland, in one year. His debut was on 23 March 1988, as he played seven minutes in a 2–2 friendly draw in England.

== Honours ==
PSV

- European Cup: 1987–88
- Eredivisie: 1985–86, 1986–87, 1987–88, 1988–89, 1990–91
- KNVB Cup: 1987–88, 1988–89, 1989–90
