= Arthur Plummer =

English footballer and manager

Personal information
- Date of birth: 1907
- Place of birth: Bristol, England
- Date of death: 17 April 1962 (aged 54–55)
- Position: Midfielder

Senior career*
| Years | Team | Apps | (Gls) |
- Bedminster Down Sports
- Bristol City
- Welton Rovers
- Bath City
- Coventry City
- Boston Town
- Walsall
- Dundalk
- Valenciennes
- Albert
- Bristol Rovers
- Gloucester City

Managerial career
- 1946–1947: Valenciennes
- * Club domestic league appearances and goals

Arthur Plummer (1907 – 17 April 1962) was an English professional football player and manager.

== Playing career ==
He played club football for Bedminster Down Sports, Bristol City, Welton Rovers, Bath City, Coventry City, Boston Town, Walsall, Dundalk, Valenciennes, Albert, Bristol Rovers and Gloucester City.

== Coaching career ==
He managed French team Valenciennes between 1946 and 1947.
