= Stan Hillier =

English footballer and manager

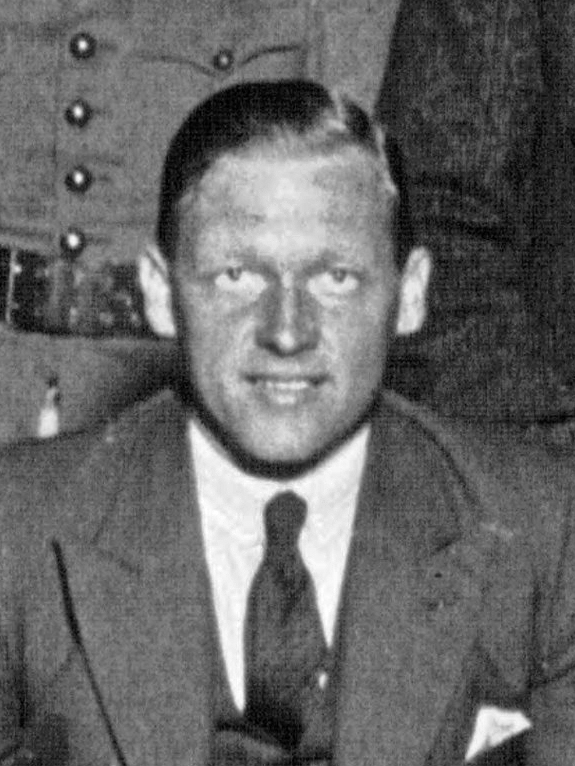
- Hillier with the Cannes team at Gare de Lyon in 1932

Personal information
- Full name: Stanley Hillier
- Date of birth: 1904
- Place of birth: London, England
- Position: Inside left

Senior career*
Years	Team	Apps	(Gls)
–1924	Erith & Belvedere		
1924–1926	Bradford City	11	(2)
1926–1928	Gillingham	26	(4)
1928–1934	AS Cannes		
Total		37	(6)

Managerial career
- 1932–1934: AS Cannes
- 1938–1939: FC Nancy
- * Club domestic league appearances and goals

Stanley Hillier (born 1904) was an English professional football player and manager.

== Career ==
Hillier was born in London in 1904. He played football for Erith & Belvedere, before joining Bradford City in May 1924. He made 11 first-team appearances with Bradford scoring two goals, all in the Football League, before joining Gillingham in December 1926. He played for Gillingham until 1928, making 26 appearances and scoring four goals.

Hillier then emigrated in France, playing for Cannes. He became Cannes manager after William Aitken left, from 1934 to 1938. He also managed Nancy in 1938-39.
