= Charles Griffiths (footballer) =

English footballer and manager

Personal information
- Date of birth: 1878
- Place of birth: Oswestry, England
- Date of death: 15 May 1936 (aged 57–58)
- Place of death: Rugby, England
- Position: Inside forward

Senior career*
Years	Team	Apps	(Gls)
- Oswestry Olympics
- Chirk
- Oswestry United
- St Helens Town
- Barnsley
- Luton Town
- Coventry City
- Barrow
1907	Preston North End	0	(0)
1907	Lincoln City	1	(0)
- Wellington Town
- Wrexham

Managerial career
- 1910–1911: Karlsruher FV
- 1911–1912: Bayern Munich
- 1912–1914: Stuttgarter Kickers
- 1920: Belgium
- 1920–1922: Vitesse Arnhem
- 1922: Be Quick 1887
- 1922–1923: Royale Union Saint-Gilloise
- 1923: Lille
- 1924: France Olympic
- 1925: Berchem Sport
- 1933: Excelsior AC Roubaix
- 1933–1936: Royale Union Saint-Gilloise
- * Club domestic league appearances and goals

Charles Griffiths (1878 – 15 May 1936) was an English football player and coach. He played in England, and coached in Belgium, France, Germany and the Netherlands in the early 20th century.

== Early life ==
Griffiths was born in Oswestry to a Welsh father and an English mother.

== Playing career ==
Griffiths played as an inside-forward for Luton Town and Barrow before joining Preston North End in 1907. He then made one appearance in the Football League for Lincoln City in 1907. He also played for Oswestry Olympics, Chirk, Oswestry United, St Helens Town, Barnsley, Coventry City, Wellington Town and Wrexham.

He was temporarily banned from playing in 1899 for "taking part in a six-a-side and other illegal competitions."

== Coaching career ==
In 1910, he worked for Karlsruher FV.

In August 1911, he was appointed as the first full-time manager of Bayern Munich, however his time at the club was to last only seven months at the Bavarian club and he was dismissed on 6 April 1912. He had however convinced the Bayern board members that a full-time coach was beneficial to the club.

He would go on to manage Stuttgarter Kickers where he won the Southern German championship during his first season with the club. His second season was curtailed due to the breakout of World War I.

Griffiths was part of the coaching staff for the Belgium national team in 1920 when they won the Olympic Games Football at the 1920 Summer Olympics football tournament.

He managed Dutch club side Vitesse Arnhem between 1920 and 1922 and Be Quick in the 1922 Championship play-off.

In September 1923, he joined Olympique Lillois.

In February 1924, he was appointed as the head coach for the France national team.

He was appointed as manager at Belgian club side Berchem Sport in 1925.

He won the Coupe de France in 1933 whilst manager at Excelsior AC Roubaix. He returned to his former club Royale Union Saint-Gilloise, and won the league in three consecutive seasons from 1933 to 1935.

He retired in February 1936 due to ill health.

== Later life and death ==
Griffiths died in a hospital in Rugby on 15 May 1936.

== Honours ==
Karlsruhe FV

- Southern German championship: 1911

Stuttgart Kickers

- Southern German championship: 1913

RU Saint-Gilloise

- Belgian First Division: 1922–23, 1932–33, 1933–34, 1934–35
