= Ernest Payne (footballer) =

English footballer

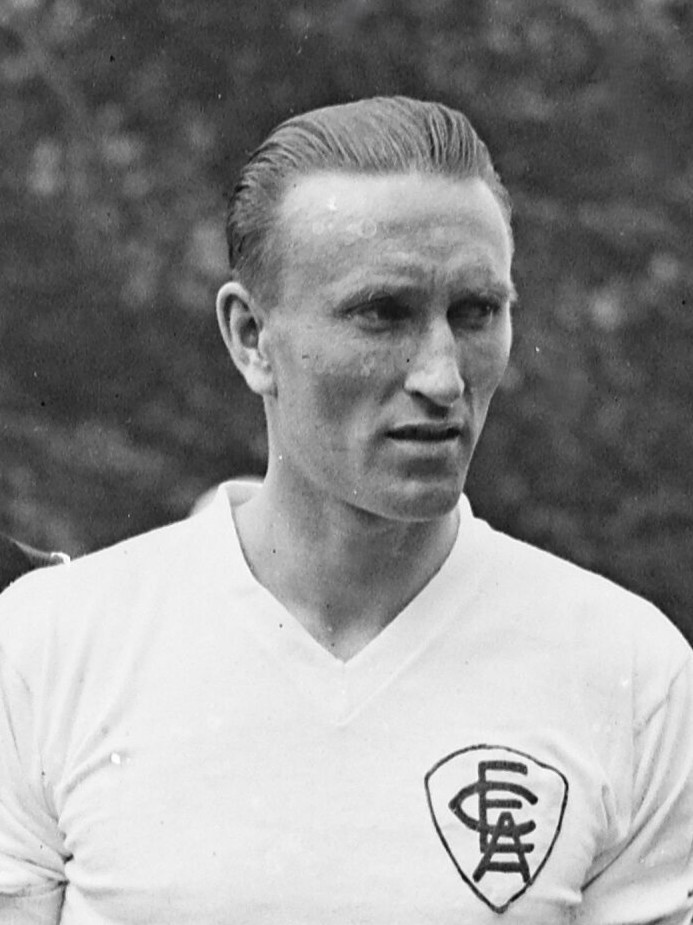
- Ernest Payne on May 7, 1933, before the Coupe de France final

Senior career*
Years	Team	Apps	(Gls)
1932–1935	Excelsior Roubaix		
1935–1939	Boulogne		

Managerial career
- 1937–1939: Boulogne
- 1945–1947: Rouen
- 1948–1949: Roubaix-Tourcoing
- * Club domestic league appearances and goals

Ernest Payne was an English professional footballer active in France in the 1930s and 1940s. Payne played club football with Excelsior Roubaix and Boulogne, and later managed Boulogne, Rouen and Roubaix-Tourcoing.
