= Noël Liétaer =

French footballer (1908-1941)

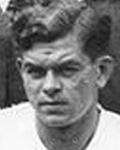

Personal information
- Full name: Noël Liétaer
- Date of birth: 17 November 1908
- Place of birth: Neuville-en-Ferrain, France
- Date of death: 21 February 1941 (aged 32)
- Place of death: Rostock, Nazi Germany
- Position: Midfielder

International career
Years	Team	Apps	(Gls)
- France

Noël Liétaer (17 November 1908 – 21 February 1941) was a French association footballer. He played for U.S. Tourcoing and Excelsior AC Roubaix, and earned 7 caps for the France national football team, and played in the 1934 FIFA World Cup. A soldier in the French Army's 100th Infantry Regiment, he died of an illness in Rostock as a prisoner of war in 1941.
