= Célestin Delmer =

French footballer (1907-1996)

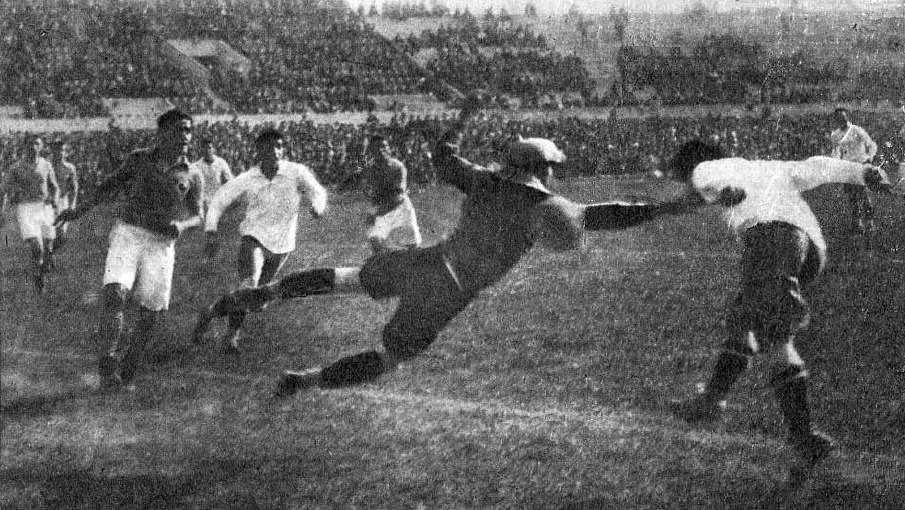
- Guillermo Subiabre scores the goal with which Chile beat France in the 1930 Soccer World Cup.

Personal information
- Full name: Henri Célestin Delmer
- Date of birth: 15 February 1907
- Place of birth: Villejuif, France
- Date of death: 2 March 1996 (aged 89)
- Place of death: Saint-Maur-des-Fossés, France
- Position: Midfielder

Senior career*
Years	Team	Apps	(Gls)
1927–1928	Stade Olympique de l'Est		
1928–1929	Mulhouse		
1930–1932	Amiens		
1932–1935	Excelsior Roubaix		
1935–1936	Red Star		

International career
1930–1934	France	11	(0)
- * Club domestic league appearances and goals

Henri Célestin Delmer (15 February 1907 – 2 March 1996) was a French footballer who played as a midfielder. He was part of France's squad for the 1930 and 1934 FIFA World Cups

== Club career ==
He played for Stade Olympique Paris Est, FC Mulhouse, Amiens, Excelsior Roubaix, Red Star.

== International career ==
He played 11 matches for France between 1930 and 1934. His first cap was against Czechoslovakia on 11/05/1930.

He was part of France's squad for the 1930 FIFA World Cup, and played one match in the group stage against Chile.

His last cap was against Luxembourg on 15/04/1934.

He was part of France's squad for the 1934 FIFA World Cup but did not play in their only match in the tournament, a 3–2 defeat against Austria.

== Honours ==
Excelsior Roubaix

- Coupe de France : 1933
