= Gérard Isbecque =

French footballer (1897–1970)

Personal information
- Date of birth: 15 March 1897
- Place of birth: Roubaix, France
- Date of death: 3 August 1970 (aged 73)
- Place of death: Roubaix, France

International career
Years	Team	Apps	(Gls)
1923–1924	France	4	(1)

Gérard Isbecque (15 March 1897 – 3 August 1970) was a French footballer. He played in four matches for the France national football team in 1923 and 1924.
