= 1932–33 French Division 1 =

1st season of French Division 1

Division Nationale
- Season: 1932–33
- Champions: Olympique Lillois
- Relegated: Club Français; Hyères; Mulhouse; Red Star Olympique; Metz; Olympique Alès

Olympique Lillois won Division 1 season 1932-1933 of the French Association Football League, the first professional football season in France, defeating AS Cannes in the final.

== 20 participating teams ==
Group A

- Club Français
- Hyères Football Club
- Olympique Lillois
- Olympique de Marseille
- FC Mulhouse
- OGC Nice
- SC Nîmes
- RC Paris
- Excelsior AC Roubaix
- FC Sète

Group B

- Olympique Alès
- FC Antibes
- AS Cannes
- SC Fives
- FC Metz
- SO Montpellier
- CA Paris
- Red Star Olympique
- Stade Rennais UC
- FC Sochaux-Montbéliard
Location of teams in 1932–33 Division 1 Group A
Location of teams in 1932–33 Division 1 Group B

== Final table ==
=== Group A ===
Pos	Team	Pld	W	D	L	GF	GA	GAv	Pts	Qualification or relegation
1	Lillois (C)	18	14	0	4	41	23	1.783	28	Qualification for the final
2	Marseille	18	10	3	5	40	24	1.667	23	
3	Racing Paris	18	8	5	5	40	36	1.111	21	
4	Sète	18	8	4	6	32	32	1.000	20	
5	Nîmes	18	8	3	7	37	38	0.974	19	
6	Excelsior	18	5	8	5	32	37	0.865	18	
7	Nice	18	5	5	8	26	32	0.813	15	
8	Club Français (R)	18	5	3	10	43	50	0.860	13	Relegation to French Division 2
9	Hyères (R)	18	4	4	10	22	29	0.759	12	Relegation to French Division 2
10	Mulhouse (R)	18	4	3	11	36	48	0.750	11	Relegation to French Division 2

Rules for classification: Victory: 2 points, Draw: 1 point, Defeat: 0 points
(C) Champions; (R) Relegated

=== Group B ===
Pos	Team	Pld	W	D	L	GF	GA	GAv	Pts	Qualification or relegation
1	Antibes	18	10	4	4	39	21	1.857	24	Disqualified from the final (Note: Antibes was suspected of bribery and did not take part in the final.)
2	Cannes	18	8	6	4	37	24	1.542	22	Qualification for the final
3	Sochaux	18	9	4	5	40	31	1.290	22	
4	Montpellier	18	9	3	6	37	36	1.028	21	
5	CA Paris	18	8	4	6	38	37	1.027	20	
6	Rennes	18	7	4	7	41	36	1.139	18	
7	Fives	18	6	5	7	42	48	0.875	17	
8	Red Star (R)	18	4	6	8	38	29	1.310	14	Relegation to French Division 2
9	Metz (R)	18	5	3	10	25	51	0.490	13	Relegation to French Division 2
10	Alès (R)	18	2	5	11	25	49	0.510	9	Relegation to French Division 2

Rules for classification: Victory: 2 points, Draw: 1 point, Defeat: 0 points
(R) Relegated

== Results ==
=== Group A ===
Home \ Away	CF	EAR	HFC	OL	OM	MUL	NIC	NMS	RCP	SÈT
Club Français		2–2	2–2	1–3	6–2	5–0	2–0	5–2	5–5	2–3
Excelsior Roubaix	4–1		2–1	2–1	2–1	2–2	2–2	4–4	1–1	0–3
Hyères	3–1	3–1		0–1	1–1	1–1	1–0	2–2	1–2	1–2
Olympique Lillois	5–3	2–0	2–1		1–2	2–0	3–0	4–0	4–1	4–2
Marseille	5–1	2–2	1–2	7–0		3–1	1–0	2–0	1–0	3–1
Mulhouse	2–3	6–2	3–1	1–2	1–4		5–2	3–4	3–5	3–1
Nice	2–0	2–2	2–1	2–3	1–0	5–2		2–3	0–0	2–2
SC Nîmes	3–1	2–0	3–0	0–3	1–3	3–1	2–0		5–1	1–3
Racing Paris	4–1	2–2	2–1	0–1	3–1	2–1	2–2	3–1		5–3
Sète	3–2	0–2	1–0	1–0	1–1	1–1	1–2	1–1	3–2	

Legend: Blue = home team win; Yellow = draw; Red = away team win.

=== Group B ===
Home \ Away	ALÈ	FCA	CAN	CAP	SCF	MET	SOM	RSO	REN	SOC
Alès		3–3	2–4	2–1	7–4	2–3	2–2	0–0	4–4	0–1
Antibes	0–0		1–0	3–0	5–0	1–1	0–2	2–0	3–1	4–1
Cannes	2–0	3–0		2–2	5–5	0–1	3–0	2–1	3–0	1–1
CA Paris	2–1	2–3	1–1		1–2	2–1	2–2	2–2	3–1	3–5
Fives	3–0	0–5	1–1	0–2		8–1	2–3	3–2	4–4	2–2
Metz	4–0	3–2	0–2	2–3	0–0		2–1	1–7	1–2	0–3
Montpellier	2–0	2–1	1–2	3–4	4–2	7–3		1–1	1–0	2–0
Red Star Olympique	5–0	2–3	1–1	3–4	0–1	2–2	4–0		6–2	0–1
Rennes	4–0	0–0	5–4	3–1	0–1	4–0	6–1	3–1		1–1
Sochaux	5–2	1–3	2–1	1–3	6–4	5–0	2–3	1–1	2–1	

Legend: Blue = home team win; Yellow = draw; Red = away team win.

== Final ==
14 May 1933

Olympique Lillois	4–3	Cannes
Barrett 25'; Varga 30'; Winckelmans 75', 86'		Fecchino 59'; Calecca 78'; Tourniaire 82'

Stade Olympique Yves-du-Manoir, Colombes
Attendance: 16,000

== Top goalscorers ==
Rank	Player	Club	Goals
1	(France) Robert Mercier	Club Français	15
1	(Germany) Walter Kaiser	Rennes	15
3	(France) Joseph Alcazar	Marseille	14
3	(France) Pierre Fecchino	Cannes	14
5	(Austria) Karl Klima	Antibes	13
5	(Uruguay) Horacio Finamore	Red Star	13
7	(France) Robert Saint-Pé	Fives	12
7	(Hungary) Istvan Zavadsky	Montpellier	12
7	(France) Pierre Bertrand	Red Star	12
10	(France) André Cheuva	Fives	11
10	(France) Ernest Libérati	Fives	11
10	(France) Julien Dominique	Rennes	11
