= Billy Aitken (footballer) =

Scottish footballer and manager (1894–1973)

Willie Aitken
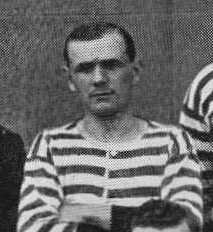
- Aitken in 1917

Personal information
- Full name: William John Aitken
- Date of birth: 2 February 1894
- Place of birth: Peterhead, Scotland
- Date of death: 9 August 1973 (aged 79)
- Place of death: Gateshead, England
- Height: 5 ft 6 in (1.68 m)
- Position: Forward

Youth career
- Kirkintilloch

Senior career*
| Years | Team | Apps | (Gls) |
| 1916–1918 | Queen's Park | 62 | (14) |
| 1918–1919 | Rangers | 21 | (2) |
| 1919–1920 | Port Vale | 30 | (4) |
| 1920–1924 | Newcastle United | 104 | (10) |
| 1924–1926 | Preston North End | 56 | (11) |
| 1926 | Chorley | | |
| 1926–1927 | Norwich City | 14 | (0) |
| 1927–1928 | Bideford Town | | |
| 1928–1930 | Juventus | 0 | (0) |
| 1930–1934 | Cannes | | |
| 1934–1936 | Reims | | |
| 1936–1939 | Antibes | 6 | (0) |
| Total | | 293+ | (41+) |

Managerial career
- 1928–1930: Juventus
- 1932–1934: Cannes
- 1934–1936: Reims
- 1937–1939: Antibes
- 1947–1948: Union SG
- 1949: Brann
- * Club domestic league appearances and goals

William John Aitken (2 February 1894 – 9 August 1973) was a Scottish football player and manager.

A forward, he was known for his trait of bouncing the ball on his head whilst running along the touchline, and was normally known as Willie or Billy. He began his career at Kirkintilloch before joining Rangers via Queen's Park in 1918. He signed with Port Vale in 1919 before he was sold to Newcastle United for £2,500 in May 1920. He spent four seasons at Tyneside before joining Preston North End in 1924. He spent two years with the "Lambs", and had spells at Chorley, Norwich City and Bideford Town.

He was appointed as head coach at Italian club Juventus in 1928. He moved on to France the following year to play for Cannes. He played in the 1932 Coupe de France final victory and was later appointed as club manager. He then spent 1934 to 1936 as player-manager at Reims and then took charge at Antibes between 1936 and 1938. During World War II, he worked as a defence contractor at Vickers-Armstrongs, and he coached across Europe, in addition to working for a wine and spirits distributor.

== Career ==
=== Career in Scotland ===
Aitken played for amateur sides Kirkintilloch and Queen's Park, before joining Rangers for the 1918–19 season. He scored two goals in 21 league games as they finished second to Old Firm rivals Celtic in the Scottish League Division One. Aitken then left Ibrox for England to play for Port Vale in the summer of 1919.

=== Career in England ===
He scored on his Port Vale debut at inside-right in a 2–0 win at Aston Villa Reserves in a Central League match on 20 August 1919. After Vale were promoted to the Football League Second Division in October 1919, the Vale were forced to pay £500 to Rangers for his and Peter Pursell services. He scored nine goals in 44 games in 1919–20 and was in the cup-winning sides of 1920.

He transferred to Newcastle United for £2,500 in May 1920, considered a bargain at the time. He began playing as an inside-forward at St James' Park, and although he only scored ten goals in 110 league games in four seasons at the club, his unselfishness in attack and overall contribution to the team was greatly appreciated. Newcastle finished fifth in the First Division in 1920–21, with Aitken claiming three goals in 38 appearances. He was limited to 16 games as United finished seventh in 1921–22. They then finished fourth in 1922–23, with Aitken scoring four goals in 26 matches. He scored three goals in 30 appearances as Newcastle posted a ninth-place finish in 1923–24. He played alongside Stan Seymour and Tommy McDonald.

In 1924 Aitken signed for Preston North End for £1,000.

He then joined Chorley, Norwich City and Bideford Town.

=== Juventus ===
He travelled to Italy, and impressed Juventus chairman Edoardo Agnelli with his idea of exporting the playing system pioneered by Arsenal manager Herbert Chapman. However, not everyone was convinced by his new methods, and some "Juve" players were unwilling to put in the extra work required to make the system work. He nevertheless led the "Old Lady" to a third-place finish in 1929–30. Though he found little success at Stadio di Corso Marsiglia, his methods were built upon by future coaches at the club. He was unable to take to the field as a player, as foreigners were not permitted to play in the Italian leagues.

=== Career in France ===
He eventually ended up playing and coaching football in France for Cannes, Reims and Antibes. At Cannes, he was part of the team that reached the Coupe de France final at the Stade Olympique Yves-du-Manoir on 24 April 1932, which they won 1–0 over Roubaix. They also finished as runners-up in the Ligue de Football Professionnel in 1932–33. With Reims, he won the Championnat de France amateur league in 1935.

== Later life ==
He returned to Britain during World War II and worked as a defence contractor at Vickers-Armstrongs. He later coached in Belgium (Union SG) and Norway (Brann) and became a representative of a wine and spirits distributor in Tyne and Wear.

== Career statistics ==
Appearances and goals by club, season and competition
| Club | Season | League | | | National cup (Note: Includes FA Cup, Scottish Cup) | | Total | |
| Club | Season | Division | Apps | Goals | Apps | Goals | Apps | Goals |
|---|---|---|---|---|---|---|---|---|
| Rangers | 1918–19 | Scottish Division One | 21 | 2 | 2 | 1 | 23 | 3 |
| Port Vale | 1919–20 | Second Division | 30 | 4 | 1 | 0 | 31 | 4 |
| Newcastle United | 1920–21 | First Division | 35 | 3 | 3 | 0 | 38 | 3 |
| Newcastle United | 1921–22 | First Division | 16 | 0 | 0 | 0 | 16 | 0 |
| Newcastle United | 1922–23 | First Division | 25 | 4 | 1 | 0 | 26 | 4 |
| Newcastle United | 1923–24 | First Division | 28 | 3 | 2 | 0 | 30 | 3 |
| Newcastle United | Total | | 104 | 10 | 6 | 0 | 110 | 10 |
| Preston North End | 1924–25 | First Division | 41 | 6 | 2 | 0 | 43 | 6 |
| Preston North End | 1925–26 | Second Division | 15 | 5 | 0 | 0 | 15 | 5 |
| Preston North End | Total | | 56 | 11 | 2 | 0 | 58 | 11 |
| Norwich City | 1926–27 | Third Division South | 14 | 0 | 0 | 0 | 14 | 0 |

== Honours ==
Cannes

- Coupe de France: 1932

Reims

- Championnat de France amateur: 1935
