= CO Roubaix-Tourcoing =

Defunct football club based in Roubaix, France

Roubaix-Tourcoing
- Full name: Club Olympique de Roubaix Tourcoing
- Founded: 1945; 81 years ago
- Dissolved: 15 June 1970; 55 years ago
- Ground: Stade Amédée-Prouvost; Roubaix; France
Home colours	Away colours

Club Olympique de Roubaix-Tourcoing was a football club based in Roubaix, France. The team was founded in 1945 in a merge of three clubs: Excelsior AC Roubaix, RC Roubaix and US Tourcoing. In the 1946–47 season, the club won the Division 1. The club later fell into the lower levels of French football and was eventually dissolved on 15 June 1970.

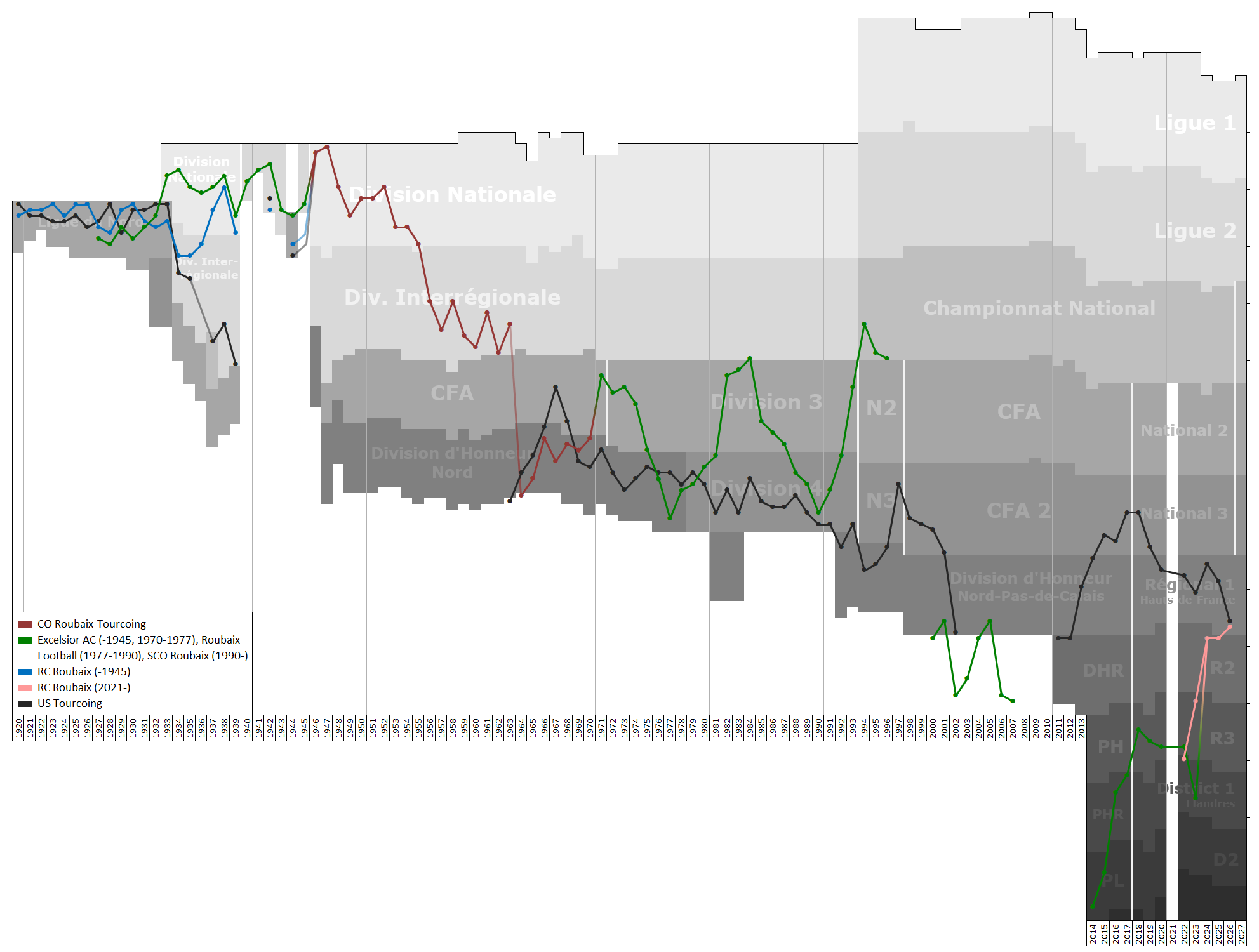
Historical league performance chart of CO Roubaix-Tourcoing and its successors

== Honours ==
- Division 1: 1946–47

== Managerial history ==
- Jean Batmale (1945–1946)
- Charles Demeillez (1946–1947)
- Georges Winckelmans (1947–1948)
- Ernest Payne (1948–1949)
- Julien Darui (1949 – January 1953)
- Marcel Desrousseaux (January 1953 – February 1955)
- Jean Baratte (February 1955 – 1955)
- Stanis Laczny (1955 – April 1959)
- Robert Lemaitre (April 1959 – 1959)
- Jean Lechantre (1959–1960)
- Maurice Blondel (1960–1962)
- Jacques Favre (1962–1963)
- Marcel Desrousseaux (1963–1964)
