= Georges Verriest =

French footballer (1909–1985)

Personal information
- Date of birth: 15 July 1909
- Place of birth: Roubaix, France
- Date of death: 11 July 1985 (aged 75)
- Position: Midfielder

Senior career*
Years	Team	Apps	(Gls)
- RC Roubaix

International career
1933–1936	France	14	(1)
- * Club domestic league appearances and goals

Georges Verriest (15 July 1909 – 11 July 1985) was a French footballer. He played for RC Roubaix, and earned 14 caps for the France national team, and scored a goal in the 1934 FIFA World Cup.
