= Charles Bardot =

French footballer (born 1904)

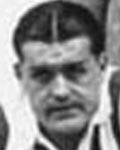

Personal information
- Date of birth: 7 April 1904
- Place of birth: French Algeria
- Date of death: 25 April 1973 (aged 69)

International career
Years	Team	Apps	(Gls)
1925-1932	France	6	(3)

Charles Bardot (French: [ʃaʁl baʁdo]; 7 April 1904 – 25 April 1973) was a French footballer. He played in six matches for the France national football team between 1925 and 1932.
