= Excelsior AC (France) =

Defunct football club based in Roubaix, France

- Full name: Excelsior Athlétic Club
- Founded: 1928; 98 years ago
- Dissolved: 1978; 48 years ago (merged with SCO Roubaix)
- Ground: Stade Amédée Prouvost; Roubaix; France
- Capacity: ?
Home colours	Away colours

Excelsior Athlétic Club was a French association football team playing in the city of Roubaix, Nord.

== History ==
The team was founded in 1928 in a merger between Football Club de Roubaix and Excelsior Club de Tourcoing. In 1932, the team turned professional and played the first professional football season in 1932/1933 and won the same year its first major trophy, the Coupe de France. Till the World War II, the team managed to stay in Division 1. After the war, the club merged with RC Roubaix and US Tourcoing in CO Roubaix-Tourcoing (1945–1970). After 1970, the team struggled at an amateur level till its demise in 1995. In 1977, the team merged with Sporting Club de Roubaix to create Roubaix Football, which also merged in 1990 with Stade Roubaix (i.e. former RC Roubaix) but never managed to come back to Division 1, only playing the 1983/84 season in Division 2. The team ended due to financial problems.

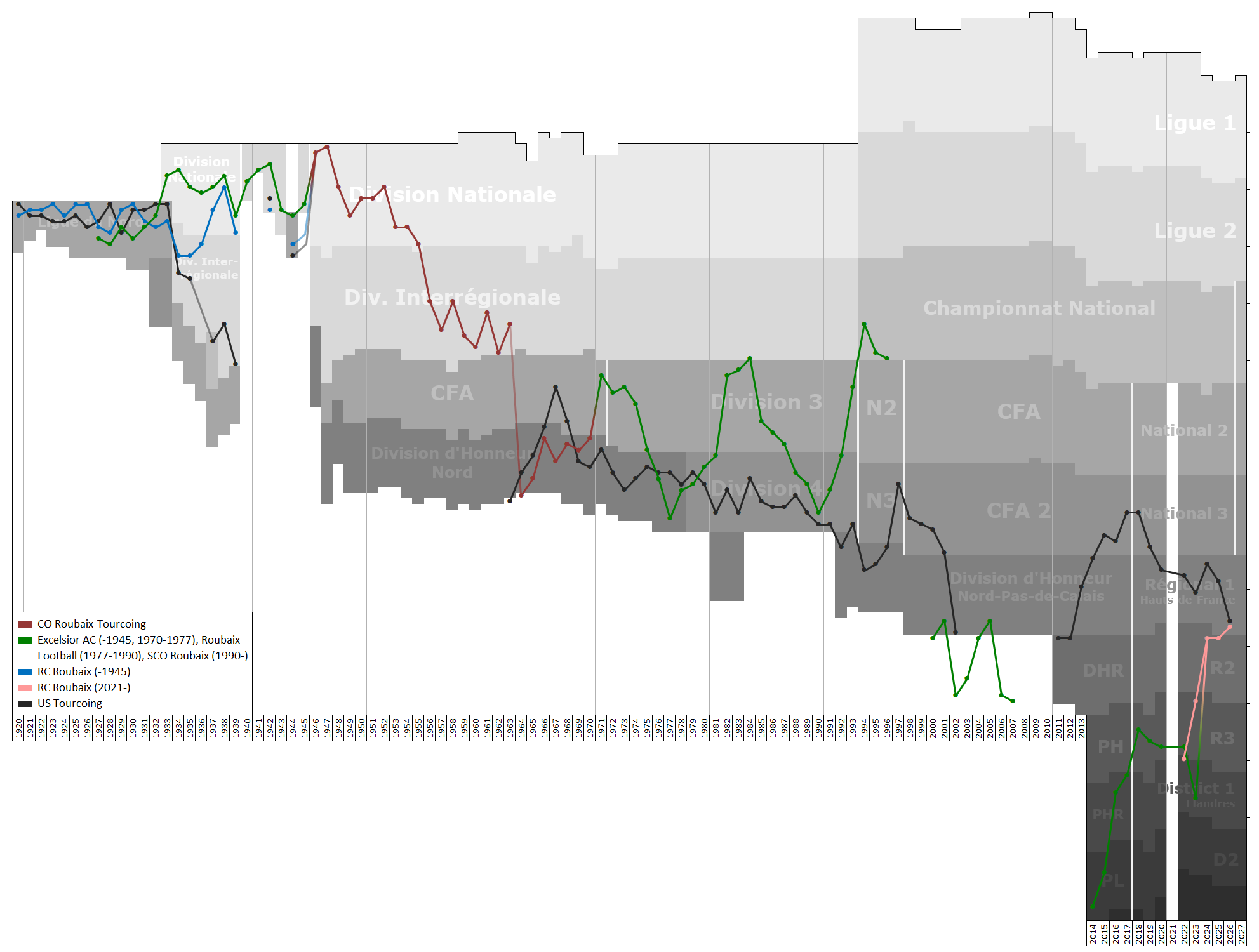
Historical league performance chart of CO Roubaix-Tourcoing and its successors

== Names of the club ==
- 1928–1944. Excelsior Athlétic Club de Roubaix.
- 1944–1970. in CO Roubaix-Tourcoing.
- 1970–1977. Excelsior Athlétic Club de Roubaix.
- 1977–1990. Roubaix Football
- 1990–1995. Stade Club Olympique de Roubaix (SCOR).

== Honours ==
- Coupe de France
  - Winners (1): 1933

== Notable players ==
- French international players
- Célestin Delmer (5, 1933–1934)
- Marcel Desrousseaux (2, 1935–1937)
- Jean Gautheroux (1, 1936)
- Henri Hiltl (1, 1944) (he played for Austria as Heinrich Hiltl, then for France as Henri Hiltl)
- Marcel Langiller
- Lucien Leduc
- Noël Liétaer (7, 1933–1934)
- Jean Sécember (4, 1935)

== Managerial history ==
- Charles Griffiths: 1932–1933
- René Dedieu: 1933–1937
- Davidovitch: 1937–1939
- Marcel Desrousseaux: 1970–1972
- Pierre Cnude: 1972–1973
- J. Schmidt: 1973–1975
- Albert Dubreucq: 1975–1977
- Sarrazyn: 1977–1980
- Tony Giaquinto: 1980 – April 1987
- Thierry Deneulin: April 1987–?
- Boumedienne Belhadji: 1992–1994
- Pierre Michelin: 1994–1995
- Boumedienne Belhadji: 1995 – December 1995

== See also ==
- CO Roubaix-Tourcoing
- RC Roubaix
