= AS Cannes =

French football club, based in Cannes

Cannes
- Full name: Association Sportive de Cannes Football
- Nickname: Les Dragons (The Dragons)
- Founded: 4 August 1902; 124 years ago
- Ground: Stade Pierre de Coubertin
- Capacity: 9,819
- President: Ryan Friedkin
- Head coach: Mathieu Chabert
- League: Ligue 3
- 2025–26: National 2 Group C, 1st of 16 (promoted)
- Website: as-cannes.com
Home colours	Away colours

Association Sportive de Cannes Football (French pronunciation: [asɔsjɑsjɔ̃ spɔʁtiv də kan]; commonly referred to as AS Cannes or simply Cannes) is a French association professional football club based in Cannes. The club was formed in 1902 as a sports club and currently play in Ligue 3, the third tier of French football after promotion from the Championnat National 1 in the 2025–26 season. Cannes plays its home matches at the Stade Pierre de Coubertin, located within the city. The team is managed by Mathieu Chabert.

The club was one of the founding members of the first division of French football and finished runners-up in the league's inaugural season. The club's highest honour to date was winning the Coupe de France in 1932. Cannes last played in Ligue 1 in the 1997–98 season and are currently serving the longest stint of any club in the National division, having been in the league since the 2001–02 season. The club has most notably served as a springboard for several prominent French football players such as Zinedine Zidane, Patrick Vieira, Johan Micoud, Gaël Clichy, Sébastien Frey and Jonathan Zebina.

Cannes is known as Les Dragons (The Dragons) and incorporates the nickname into a multitude of club's fixtures, most notably its crest. On 21 May 2010, the club unveiled its new logo to its supporters. The new logo is similar to the club's previous logo, but is more dynamic with the club's city name and foundation being displayed on the badge. The dragon, which is a focal point of the club, is also given a more up-to-date design.

== History ==
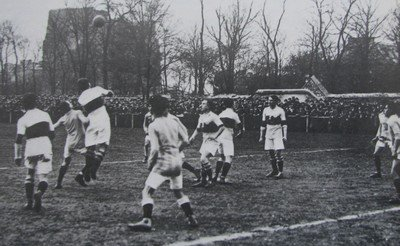
Cannes and Olympique Lillois in the Coupe de France in 1920.

Association Sportive de Cannes was founded on 4 August 1902 by English sportsman Herbert Lowe and a group of friends. Lowe was installed as the club's president. During the infancy of the club, in addition to association football, Cannes also practised the sports of competitive swimming and athletics. The club also wore a black and blue combination kit before switching to its current red and white stripe following the club's merger with Club Sportif de Cannes in 1905. Under the leadership of Louis Grosso, a local furniture dealer, the football section developed its structures. In 1920, Cannes were playing in the Ligue du Sud-Est, a regional league under the watch of the French Football Federation (FFF). While playing in the league, Cannes developed rivalries with Nice and Marseille. Nice and Cannes contest the derby match that is known as the Derby de la Côte d'Azur. In 1921, the club inaugurated the Stade Municipal de Cannes and celebrated the opening by defeating Spanish club Espanyol 4–0. During the 1920s, Cannes successfully reached the semi-finals of the Coupe de France on two occasions. Led by French internationals such as Maurice Cottenet, Charles Bardot, and Raoul Dutheil, Cannes were regular participants in the latter rounds of the prestigious cup competition. In 1932, the club finally won the competition after defeating RC Roubaix 1–0 at the Stade Olympique Yves-du-Manoir in Colombes, courtesy of a goal from captain Louis Clerc.

In July 1930, the National Council of the FFF voted 128–20 in support of professionalism in French football. Cannes, along with most clubs from the south, were among the first clubs to adopt the new statute and, subsequently, became professional and were founding members of the new league. In the league's inaugural season, Cannes finished runner-up to champions Olympique Lillois after losing 4–3 in the ultimate match on 14 May 1933. Cannes had originally finished second in its group behind Antibes, but were declared champions of the group after Antibes was disqualified from the league for suspected bribery. Cannes remained in Division 1 for a decade before falling to Division 2 in the 1948–49 season after finishing last in the league table.

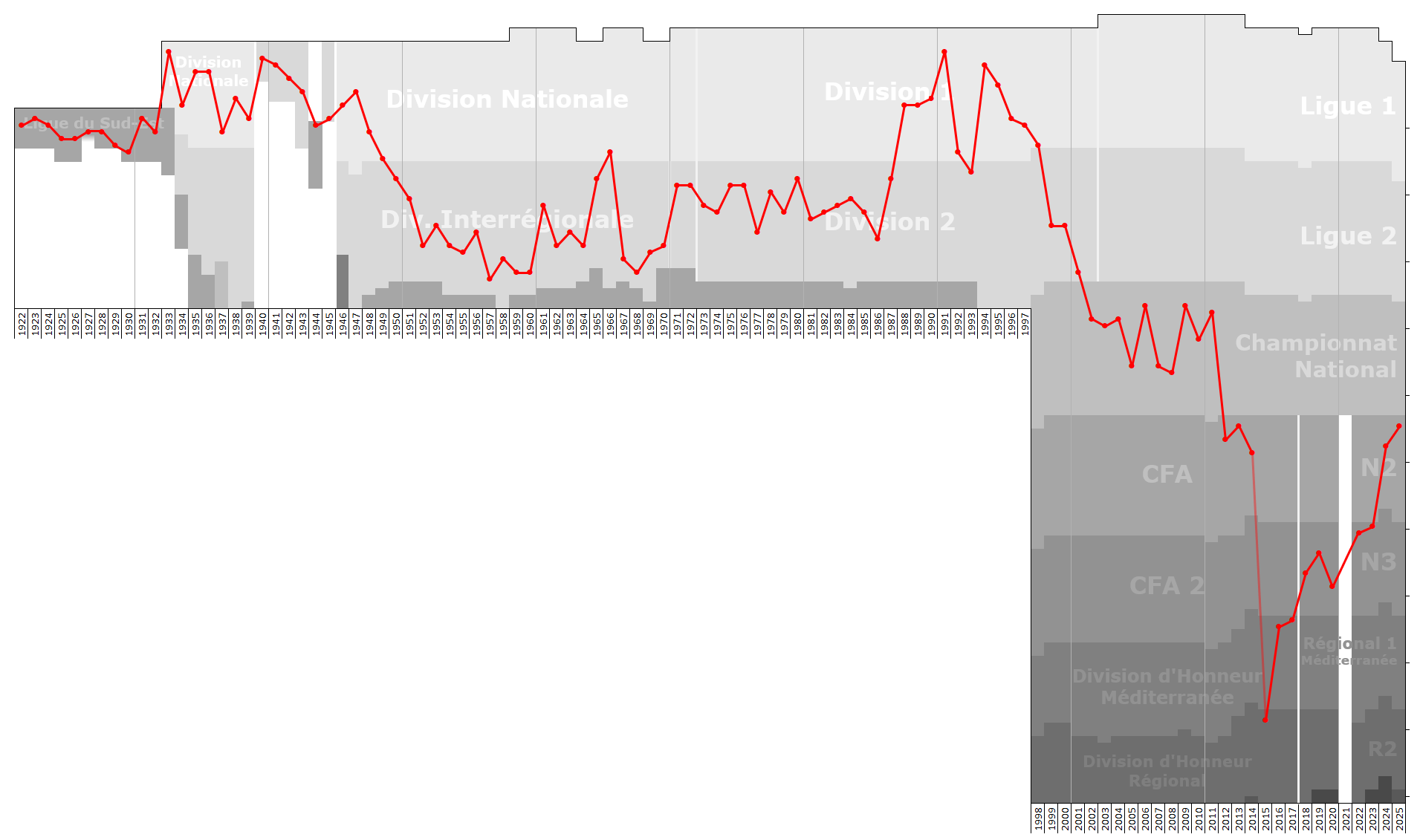
Historical league performance chart of AS Cannes

Cannes returned to the top division for the 1965–66 season and spent a forgettable campaign in the league finishing second from bottom, thus returning to Division 2. It took another 20 years before the club returned to the first division for the 1987–88 season. During this time, Cannes had a young playmaker by the name of Zinedine Zidane in its ranks. In the club return to the first division, Cannes finished in 11th place. In the ensuing two seasons, Cannes remained mid-table finishing 12th and 11th, respectively. However, in the 1990–91 season, the club surprised everyone by finishing in fourth place, which gave the club qualification for the UEFA Cup. Along with Zidane, PSG loanee striker Amara Simba and the presence of experienced players like Luis Fernandez, Cannes overclassed many of their higher-rated counterparts. Unfortunately, in the following season, with the departure of Simba and Cannes having to combine its focus on both the league and Europe, the club finished in a disastrous 19th-place position. The club also suffered elimination in Round of 32 in the UEFA Cup. The resulting relegation led to the departure of Zidane and numerous others who were being courted by Division 1 clubs.

Though the departure of Zidane and others did hurt the club, Cannes still had a solid core of players, which included veterans André Amitrano, William Ayache, Franck Durix, and Adick Koot and youngsters Johan Micoud, Patrick Vieira, David Jemmali and Laurent Macquet. The group effectively lived up to club expectations by finishing second in its group in the second division. Due to having more points than the second-place finisher in the other group, Cannes were back in Division 1. In the club's return, Cannes finished in a respectable ninth-place position for the 1994–95 season under manager Safet Sušić. The next season didn't start well, with Sušić getting sacked in September 1995. Ultimately, Cannes finished 14th that season. In the off-season heading into the 1996–97, Vieira departed the club for Italy, Durix ventured to Japan, and Ayache retired. Cannes struggled to replace the departed players and, subsequently, finished in 15th place for the season. Midway through the campaign, Micoud left the club for Bordeaux. After the season, Jammeli followed suit and also joined Bordeaux. The resulting departure of all the club's youth talent ultimately led to its downfall with Cannes finishing last in the 1997–98 season. Since the club's relegation in 1998, Cannes have yet to return to the first division of French football.

On 1 July 2014, Cannes were officially excluded from professional football in France after a ruling from the Direction Nationale du Contrôle de Gestion relating to the club's financial situation. For the 2015–16 season, the remnants of Cannes played in the Division of Honor, in the Mediterranean Regional League of the French football system.

On June 26, 2023, it was announced that AS Cannes will become part of The Friedkin Group, which also includes AS Roma football club. The Friedkin family will purchase a majority of the club's shares, and Ryan Friedkin will become the new president of Association Sportive Cannes Football SAS, which will manage the National 2 men's team. The Sports Association, which is in charge of the women's section and amateurs, will hold 2% ownership and be chaired by Anny Courtade.

On 25 February 2025, Cannes reached the Semi-final of the Coupe de France after defeating Ligue 2 club, EA Guingamp 3–1, but lost 2–1 against Reims. On 16 May 2026, Cannes secure promotion to Ligue 3 from next season after defeat US Lusitanos Saint-Maur 2–0 in final matchday.

== Players ==
=== Current squad ===
As of 5 September 2026.

Note: Flags indicate national team as defined under FIFA eligibility rules; some limited exceptions apply. Players may hold more than one non-FIFA nationality.

No.	Pos.	Nation	Player
1	GK	FRA	Quentin Beunardeau
3	DF	FRA	Cédric Makutungu (on loan from Annecy)
4	MF	FRA	Loup Hervieu
5	DF	FRA	Grégoire Pineau
6	MF	FRA	Cédric Gonçalves
7	FW	FRA	Malhory Noc
8	MF	FRA	Enzo Caumont
9	FW	WAL	George Morgan (on loan from Everton)
10	MF	FRA	Maxime Blanc
11	FW	FRA	Alan Kerouedan
14	DF	FRA	Sébastien Corchia
15	MF	SEN	Cheikh N'Doye
17	DF	FRA	Loup-Diwan Gueho

No.	Pos.	Nation	Player
18	MF	FRA	Ahmed Majid
19	DF	FRA	Jonas Smith
20	FW	ALG	Julien López
23	FW	FRA	Raphaël Gerbeaud
24	DF	FRA	Leandro Morante
25	MF	MTN	Almike N'Diaye
26	MF	FRA	Brice Oggad
27	DF	MTN	Houssen Abderrahmane
28	DF	ALG	Yanis Hadjem
29	FW	FRA	Samuel Dié (on loan from Lens)
30	GK	FRA	Fabio Vanni
—	FW	FRA	Oumar Sidibé

=== Notable players ===
Below are the notable former players who have represented Cannes in league and international competition since the club's foundation as a football club in 1909. To appear in the section below, a player must have played in at least 80 official matches for the club.

For a complete list of Cannes players, see Category:AS Cannes players

- (France) William Ayache
- (France) Jean Baeza
- (France) Bernard Casoni
- (France) Sébastien Chabaud
- (France) Gaël Clichy
- (France) Yvon Douis
- (France) Albert Emon
- (France) Julien Escudé
- (France) Luis Fernandez
- (France) Sébastien Frey
- (France) Laurent Macquet
- (France) Johan Micoud
- (France) Jean-Luc Sassus
- (France) Patrick Vieira
- (France) Zinedine Zidane
- (Algeria) Abdelkader Ferhaoui
- (Algeria) Kamel Ghilas
- (Cameroon) Ibrahim Aoudou
- (Croatia) Aljoša Asanović
- (Croatia) Alen Bokšić
- (Croatia) Ardian Kozniku
- (Czech Republic) Jan Koller
- (Indonesia) Tonnie Cusell
- (Netherlands) Adick Koot
- (Netherlands) Ruud Krol
- (Tunisia) David Jemmali
- (Socialist Federal Republic of Yugoslavia) Boro Primorac
- (Socialist Federal Republic of Yugoslavia) Dušan Savić

== Club officials ==
=== Management and coaching ===
Association Sportive de Cannes Football

- President: Anny Courtade
- General Director: Bernard Lambourde
- Head coach: Ludovic Pollet
- Assistant coach: Derek Decamps

=== Coaching history ===
Dates	Name
1932–1934	Billy Aitken
1934–1938	Stan Hillier
1938–1939	Maurice Cottenet
	Cornelli
	Francis Roux
1948	Elek Schwartz
1948–1949	Dominique Mori
1949–1952	Anton Marek
1952–1955	Lucien Troupel
	Léon Rossi
1957–1959	Paul Baron
1961–1962	Dante Lerda
1962–1964	Alberto Muro
1964–1966	Louis Mus
1966–1968	Maurice Blondel
1968–1976	Dante Lerda
1976–1981	Robert Domergue
1981–1983	Charly Loubet
1983–1985	Jean-Marc Guillou
1985–1990	Jean Fernandez
1990–1992	Boro Primorac
1992	Erick Mombaerts
1992–1994	Luis Fernandez
1994–1995	Safet Sušić
1995	William Ayache
1995–1997	Guy Lacombe
1997–1998	Adick Koot
1998	Guy Calleja
1998–2001	Roland Gransard
2001–2002	René Marsiglia
2002	Bernard Casoni
2002	Christian Lopez
2002–2003	Robert Buigues
2003	Nenad Stojkovic
2003–2004	René Marsiglia
2004–2006	Gérard Bernardet
2006–2007	Michel Dussuyer
2007	Patrice Carteron
2007–2008	Stéphane Paille
2008–2009	Patrice Carteron
2009–2011	Albert Emon
2011	Victor Zvunka
2011–2012	David Guion
2012–2014	Jean-Marc Pilorget
2014	Jean-Michel Prieur
2014–2015	Manuel Nogueira
2015–2016	Mickaël Madar
2016–2017	Mickaël Marsiglia
2017–2018	Michel Pavon
2018–2020	Ludovic Pollet
2020–2024	Jean-Noël Cabezas

== Honours ==
- Ligue 1
  - Runners-up (1): 1932–33
- Coupe de France
  - Champions (1): 1931–32
- USFSA League (Provence-Alpes-Côte d'Azur)
  - Champions (1): 1910
- Coupe Gambardella
  - Champions (2): 1955, 1995
