= RC Roubaix =

- Full name: Racing Club de Roubaix
- Founded: 1895; 131 years ago
- Dissolved: 1964; 62 years ago (merged with Stade Roubaix)
- Ground: Parc Jean Dubrule; Roubaix; France
- Capacity: ?
Home colours

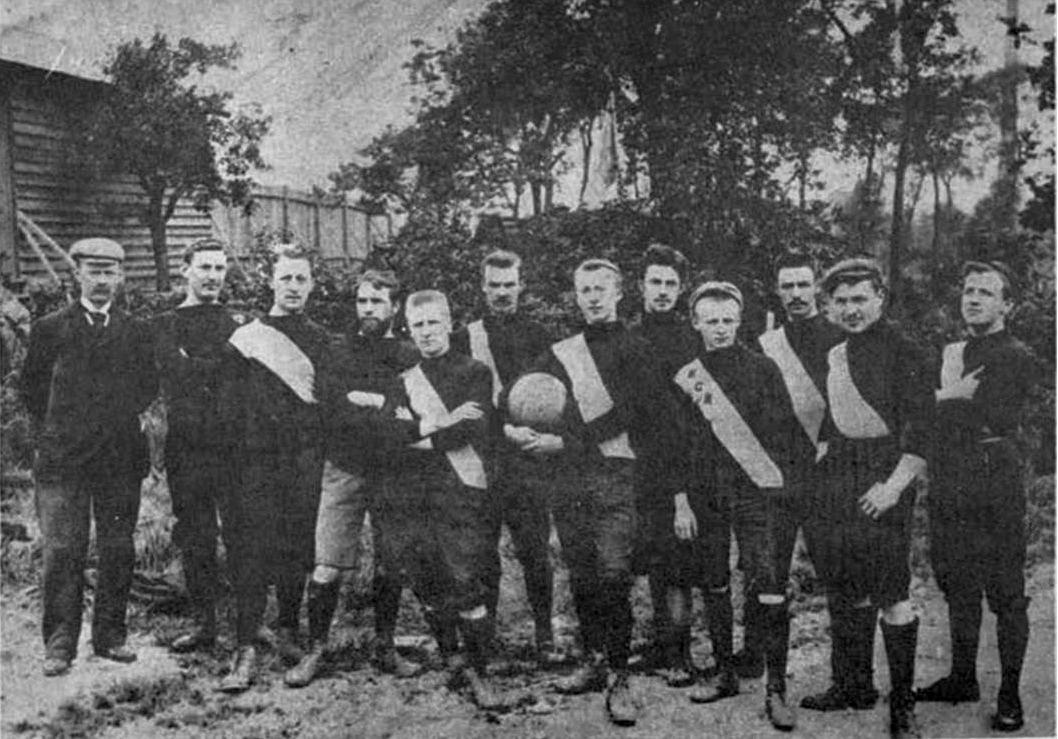
First known picture of RC Roubaix (c. 1895).

Racing Club de Roubaix was a French association football team that played in Roubaix, Nord.

== History ==
The team was founded in 1895 and was very successful before the establishment of professionalism in France. In 1933, after losing twice in a row in the final of Coupe de France, this time against city rival Excelsior AC Roubaix (a professional team), the team turned professional and reached Division 1 in 1936 and stayed there till World War II. After the war, the club merged with Excelsior AC Roubaix and US Tourcoing in CO Roubaix-Tourcoing (1945–1963). In 1963, CO Roubaix-Tourcoing lost its professional status and RC Roubaix decided to merge with another club, Stade Roubaix, to create Racing Stade Roubaisien. This team would eventually merge with Roubaix Football (i.e. former Excelsior AC Roubaix) in Stade Club Olympique de Roubaix, a team which ended in 1995 due to financial problems.

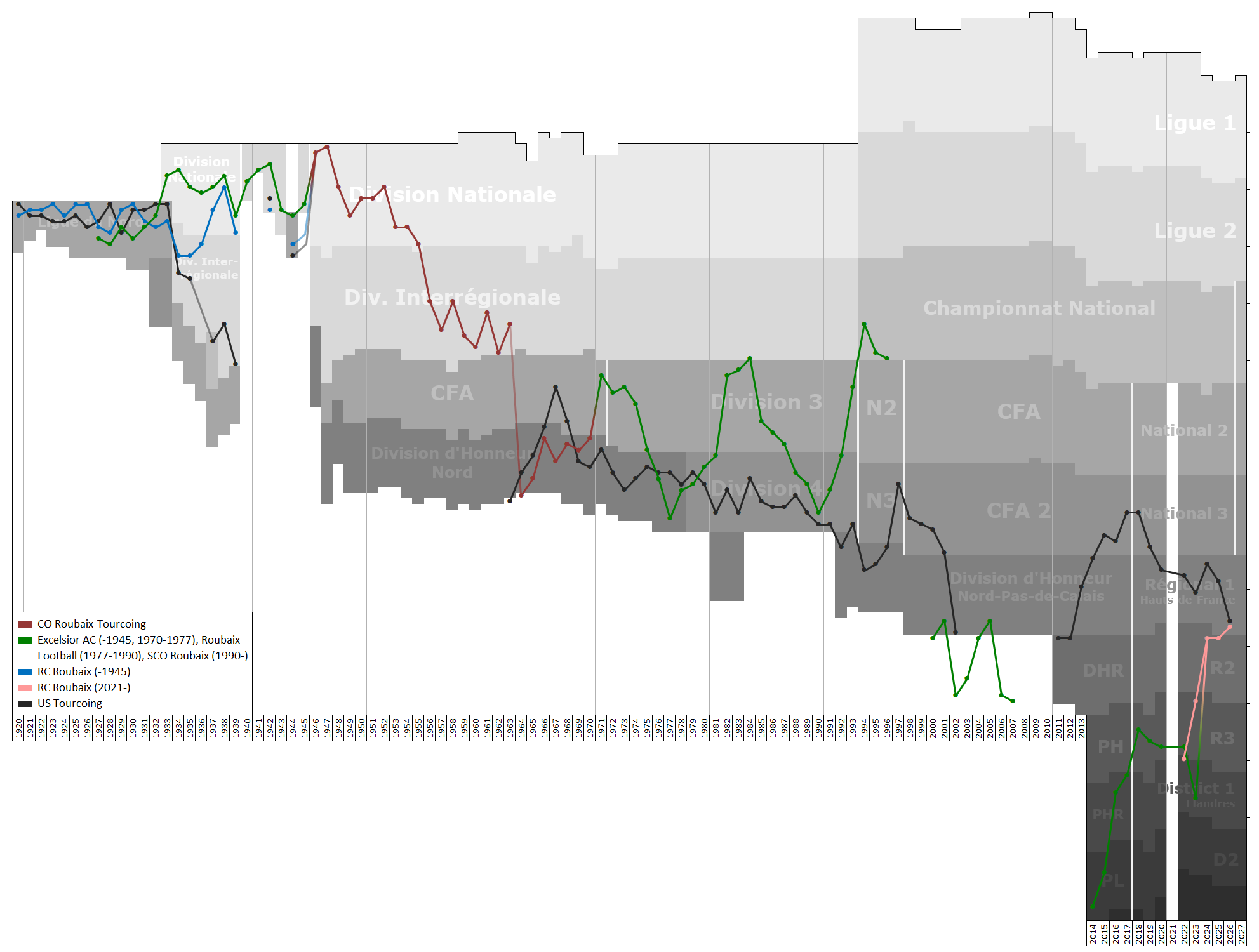
Historical league performance chart of CO Roubaix-Tourcoing and its predecessors

== Names of the club ==
- 1895–1944. Racing Club de Roubaix.
- 1944–1963. in CO Roubaix-Tourcoing.
- 1964–1990. Racing Stade Roubaisien.
- 1990–1995. Stade Club Olympique de Roubaix (SCOR).

== Honours ==
- Champion of France USFSA: Winners (5): 1901–02, 1902–03, 1903–04, 1905–06, 1907–08
- DH Nord Champion : 1923, 1925, 1926, 1930
- Coupe de France : Runner-up (2): 1931–32, 1932–33

== Notable players ==
- Emile Sartorius
- Maurice Vandendriessche
- Raymond Dubly
- Emile Dusart
- Raymond Wattine
- Gérard Isbecque
- Edmond Delfour
- Célestin Delmer
- Georges Verriest
- Georges Beaucourt
- Julien Da Rui
- Henri Hiltl
- Jean Baratte
- Jean Lechantre
- Lazare Gianessi
- Bruno Metsu

== Managerial history ==
- Charles Griffiths: 1935–?
- Franz Platko: ?

== See also ==
- CO Roubaix-Tourcoing
- Excelsior AC Roubaix
