= 1929 Coupe de France final =

- Event: 1928–29 Coupe de France
Montpellier	Sète
2	0
- Date: 5 May 1929
- Venue: Olympique Yves-du-Manoir, Colombes
- Referee: Edmond Gérardin
- Attendance: 25,000

The 1929 Coupe de France final was a football match held at Stade Olympique Yves-du-Manoir, Colombes on May 5, 1929, that saw SO Montpellier defeat FC Sète 2–0 thanks to goals by Auguste Kramer and Edmond Kramer.

== Match details ==
5 May 1929

Montpellier	2–0	Sète
A. Kramer 40'; E. Kramer 89'

Stade Olympique Yves-du-Manoir, Colombes
Attendance: 25,000
Referee: Edmond Gérardin

GK	(France) André Guillard
DF	(France) Maurice Olivet
DF	(France) Roger Rolhion
DF	(France) André Bousquet
DF	(France) René Dedieu
MF	(France) Louis Mistral
MF	(Switzerland) Edmond Kramer
FW	(France) Jacques Temple (c)
FW	(Switzerland) Auguste Kramer "Titi"
FW	(Switzerland) (France) Georges Kramer
FW	(Kingdom of Yugoslavia) Branislav Sekulić "Branko"
Manager:
? Assistant Referees: Fourth Official:

GK	(France) Laurent Henric
DF	Edward Skiller
DF	(France) André Chardar
DF	(England) David Harrison (c)
DF	William Barrett
MF	(France) Emile Féjean
MF	(France) Désiré Boutet
FW	(Kingdom of Yugoslavia) (France) Ivan Bek
FW	(France) Louis Cazal "Pierrot"
FW	(France) Jacques Dormoy
FW	(France) Marcel Galey
Manager:
?
