= Marcel Galey =

French footballer (1905–1991)

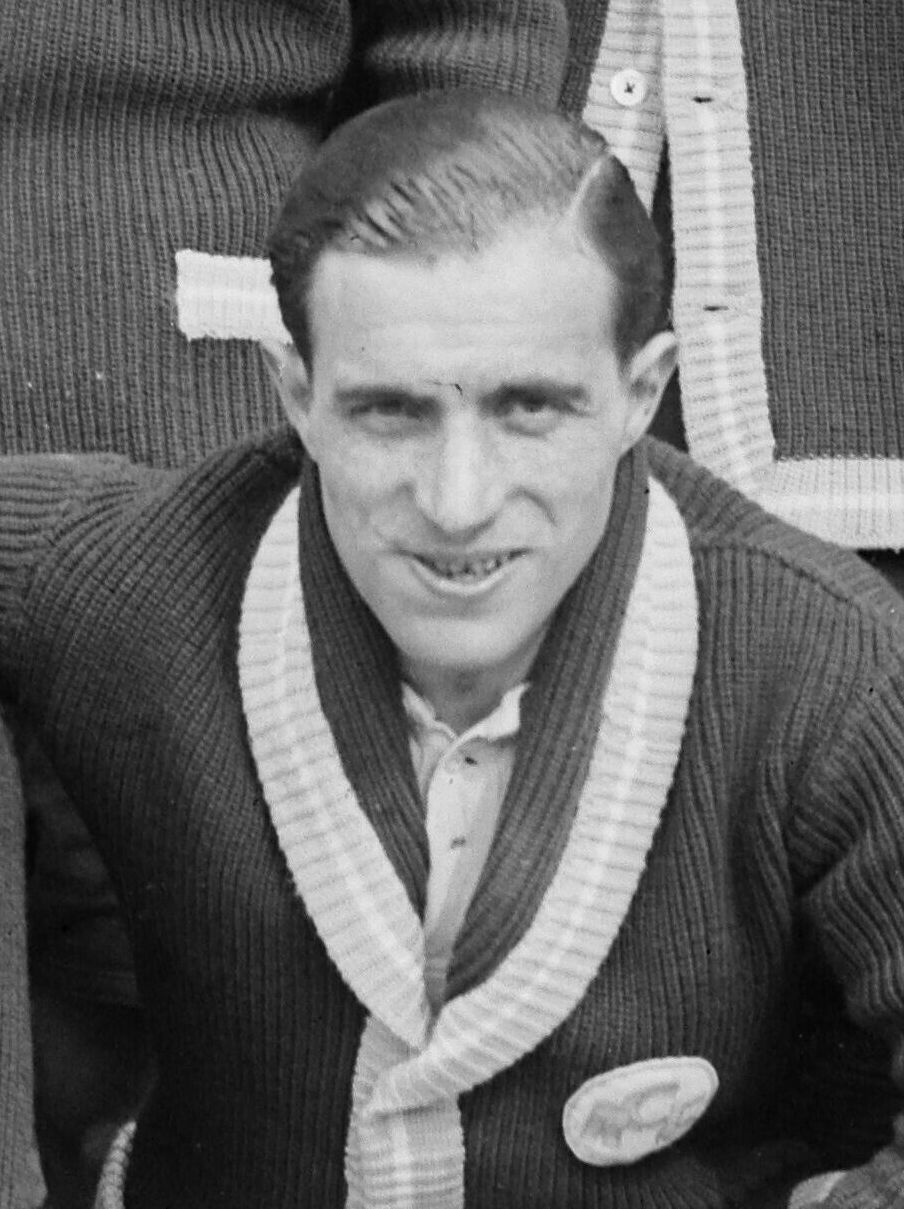
- Galey in 1930

Personal information
- Full name: Marcel Victor Galey
- Date of birth: 2 September 1905
- Place of birth: Clichy, France
- Date of death: 30 January 1991 (aged 85)
- Place of death: Saint-Cloud, France
- Height: 1.77 m (5 ft 10 in)
- Position: Forward

Senior career*
Years	Team	Apps	(Gls)
1926–1927	CA Vitry		
1927–1929	FC Sète		
1929–1936	RC Paris		

International career
1929	France	3	(1)
- * Club domestic league appearances and goals

Marcel Victor Galey (2 September 1905 – 30 January 1991) was a French footballer who played as a forward for FC Sète and the France national team in the late 1920s.

== Club career ==
Born on 2 September 1905 in the Seine town of Clichy, Hauts-de-Seine, Galey began his career at CA Vitry in 1926, aged 21, with whom he played until 1927, when he joined FC Sète. Together with André Chardar, Ivan Bek, and Louis Cazal, he was a member of the Sète team that reached the 1929 Coupe de France final, in which he was constantly outplayed by Montpellier's right-back André Bousquet in a 2–0 loss.

A few weeks later, Galey signed for RC Paris. In his first season at the club, together with Manuel Anatol, Jean Gautheroux, and Alexandre Villaplane, he helped his side reach the 1930 Coupe de France final, which ended in a 3–1 loss to his former club Sète. Galey was involved in his side's only goal of the match. He stayed at Racing for seven years, from 1929 until his retirement in 1936, aged 31, playing three league matches in his last season at the club, thus being a member of the Racing squad that won the 1935–36 French Division 1. In total, he scored 21 goals in 72 official Ligue 1 matches.

Three years later, in 1939, Galey became the sporting director of RC Paris.

== International career ==
On 24 February 1929, the 23-year-old Galey made his international debut for France in a friendly against Hungary at Colombes, helping his side to a 3–0 win. He earned a further two caps for France in 1929, both friendlies, scoring once to help his side to a 2–0 win over Portugal on 24 March.

== Death ==
Galey died in Saint-Cloud on 30 January 1991, at the age of 85.

== Honours ==
Sète

- Coupe de France:
  - Runner-up (1): 1928–29

RC Paris

- Coupe de France:
  - Runner-up (1): 1929–30
- Ligue 1:
  - Champions (1): 1935–36
