= 1930 Coupe de France final =

- Event: 1929–30 Coupe de France
Sète	RC Paris
3	1
- After extra time
- Date: 27 April 1930
- Venue: Olympique Yves-du-Manoir, Colombes
- Referee: Roger Conrié
- Attendance: 35,000

The 1930 Coupe de France final was a football match held at Stade Olympique Yves-du-Manoir, Colombes on April 27, 1930, that saw FC Sète defeat RC Paris 3–1 thanks to goals by Alexandre Friedmann and Yvan Bek (2).

== Match details ==
27 April 1930

Sète	3–1	RC Paris
Friedmann 88'; Bek 94', 111'		Lhottka 80'

Stade Olympique Yves-du-Manoir, Colombes
Attendance: 35,000
Referee: Roger Conrié

GK	(France) Charles Frondas
DF	Edward Skiller
DF	(France) André Chardar
DF	(France) Louis Cazal "Pierrot" (c)
DF	(Kingdom of Yugoslavia) Ljubiša Stefanović
MF	(France) Emile Féjean
MF	(France) Xavier Lucibello
FW	(Kingdom of Yugoslavia) (France) Ivan Bek
FW	(France) Gustave Dubus
FW	(Hungary) Alexandre Friedmann
FW	(France) Raoul Durand
Manager:
(England) Sydney Regan Assistant Referees: Fourth Official:

GK	(France) André Tassin
DF	(Spain) (France) Manuel Anatol (c)
DF	(France) Marcel Capelle
DF	(France) Paul Guézou
DF	(France) Jean Gautheroux
MF	(France) Alexandre Villaplane
MF	(France) Henri Veyssade
FW	(France) Henri Ozenne
FW	(Hungary) Ferenc Lhottka
FW	(France) Emile Veinante
FW	(France) Marcel Galey
Manager:
?

== See also ==
- 1929–30 Coupe de France
