= Louis Mistral =

French footballer (1900–1973)

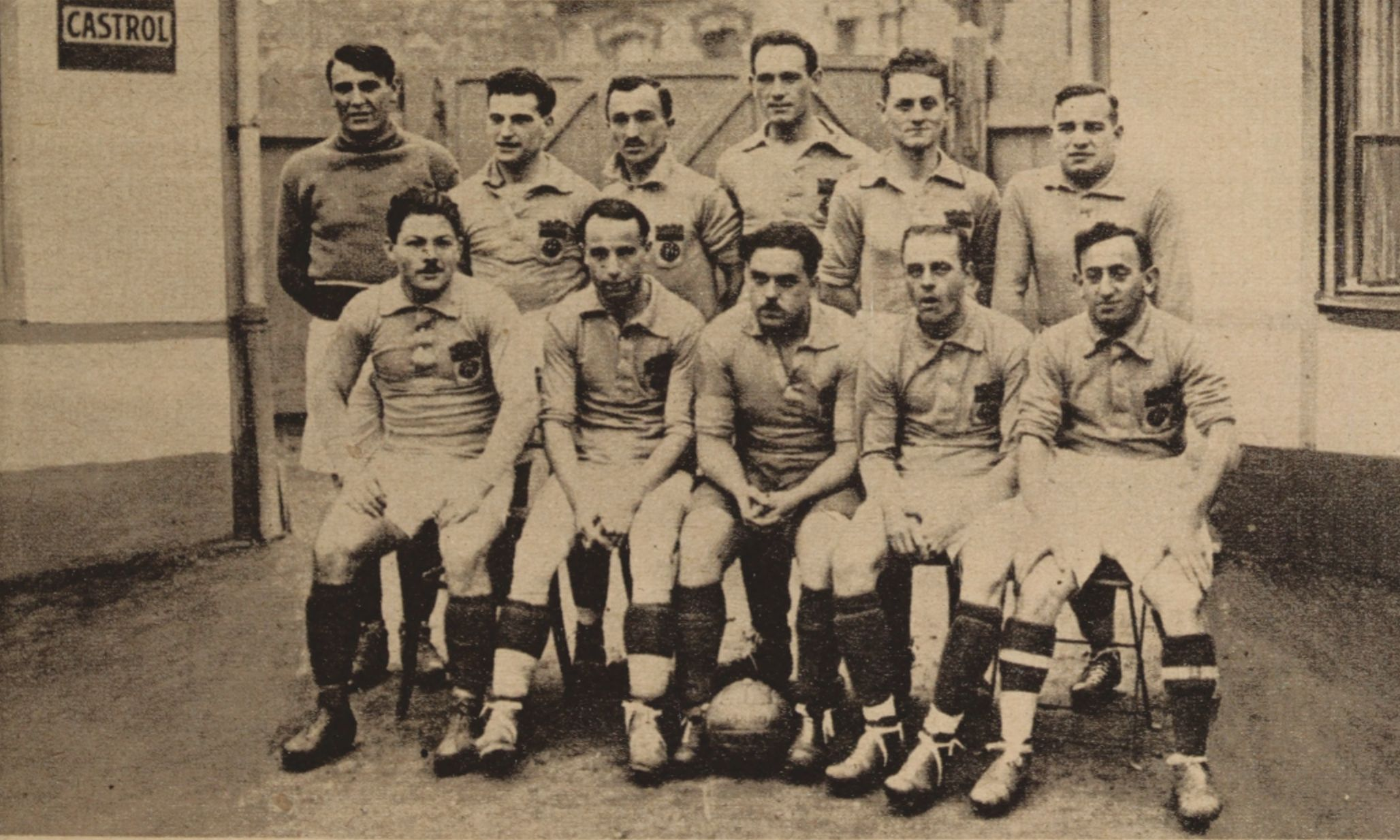
- Mistral (standing, first from right) in 1923

Personal information
- Date of birth: 4 August 1900
- Place of birth: 11th arrondissement of Paris, France
- Date of death: 12 July 1973 (aged 72)
- Place of death: Souesmes, Spain
- Position: Midfielder

Senior career*
Years	Team	Apps	(Gls)
1918–1919	Club Français		
1919–1920	Red Star		
1921–1924	Olympique de Paris		
1928–1929	Montpellier		
1929–?	Oran		

International career
1920–1923	France	5	(0)
- * Club domestic league appearances and goals

Louis Mistral (4 August 1900 – 12 July 1973) was a French footballer who played as a midfielder for the French national team in the early 1920s and Montpellier in the late 1920s.

== Club career ==
Born in the 11th arrondissement of Paris on 4 August 1900, Mistral began his career at Club Français in 1918, aged 18, with whom he played one season, joining Red Star in 1919, where he also played one season. In 1921, he signed for Olympique de Paris, and in June of that year, he was already being described by the local press as the best midfielder of the team, with whom he played for three years, until 1924.

Following a four-year hiatus, he returned to football in 1928, now as a player for Montpellier. Together with Branislav Sekulić and the Kramer brothers (Auguste, Edmond, and Georges), Mistral was a member of the Montpellier team that reached the 1929 Coupe de France final at Colombes, which ended in a 2–0 victory over Sète. In the semifinals against Stade Raphaëlois, he had endured a right hook from Rapetti. He retired shortly after.

== International career ==
On 18 January 1920, the 19-year-old Mistral made his international debut in a friendly match against Italy in Milan, which ended in a 9–4 loss. He went on to earn a total of five international caps for France between 1920 and 1923, including another heavy loss, this time 5–0 to Netherlands on 13 November 1921. The following day, the journalists of the French newspaper L'Auto (the forerunner of L'Équipe) described him as "the best midfielder, but too frequently imprecise".

== Death and legacy ==
Mistral died in Souesmes on 12 July 1973, at the age of 72.

== Honours ==
Montpellier

- Coupe de France:
  - Champions: 1928–29
