= Gustave Dubus =

French footballer (1910–1991)

Personal information
- Full name: Gustave Ernest Dubus
- Date of birth: 26 March 1910
- Place of birth: Arzew, Algeria
- Date of death: 9 December 1991 (aged 81)
- Place of death: Montmorency, France
- Position: Forward

Youth career
- AS Saint-Eugène d'Alger

Senior career*
Years	Team	Apps	(Gls)
1929–1932	FC Sète		
1932–1935	Club des Joyeusetés d'Oran		

International career
1930	France	2	(1)
- * Club domestic league appearances and goals

Gustave Ernest Dubus (26 March 1910 – 9 December 1991) was a French footballer who played as a forward for FC Sète and the France national team in the early 1930s.

== Club career ==
Born on 26 March 1910 in the Oran Province port city of Arzew, Dubus trained at AS Saint-Eugène d'Alger before moving to Sète in 1929, where he soon joined the ranks of FC Sète. Together with Ivan Bek, Ivan Bek, and Louis Cazal, he was a member of the Sète team that won the Coupe de France in 1930, beating RC Paris 3–1 in the final. During the match, he scored a few seconds before half-time from a clever pass by Bek, but the linesman had earlier signaled Sète was offside, while all of his other shots were saved by RCP's goalkeeper André Tassin.

After leaving Racing in 1932, Dubus returned to his homeland, where he joined Club des Joyeusetés d'Oran, with whom he played for three years, until 1935, when he retired.

== International career ==
On 23 February 1930, the 19-year-old Dubus made his international debut for France in a friendly match against Portugal in Porto, which ended in a 0–2 loss. The following day, the journalists of the French newspaper L'Auto (the forerunner of L'Équipe) highlighted him as one of the French players who stood out. Two months later, on 13 April, he earned his second (and last) cap, scoring his side's only goal with a "half-volley from 3 meters" in a 1–6 loss to Belgium.

== Death ==
Dubus died in Montmorency, Val-d'Oise on 9 December 1991, at the age of 81.

== Honours ==
Sète

- Coupe de France: 1929–30
