= André Guillard (footballer) =

Swiss footballer (1906–1972)

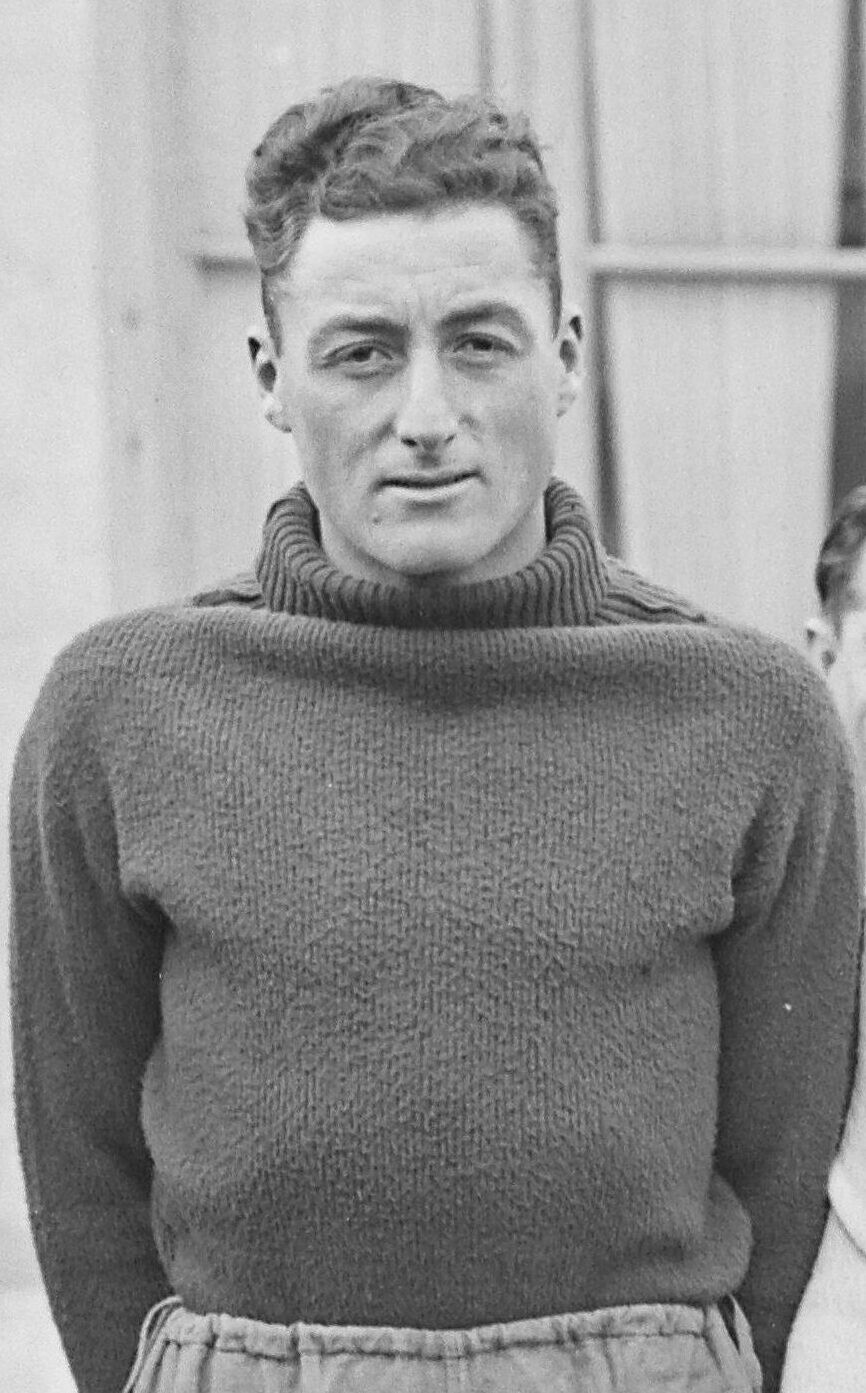

Personal information
- Full name: André Xavier Lucien Guillard
- Date of birth: 9 June 1906
- Place of birth: Saussines, France
- Date of death: 25 December 1972 (aged 66)
- Place of death: Valencia, Spain
- Position: Goalkeeper

Senior career*
Years	Team	Apps	(Gls)
1927–1928	Olympique Alès		
1928–1934	Montpellier		
1934–1938	Saint-Étienne		
1938–1939	Olympique Alès		
- * Club domestic league appearances and goals

André Xavier Lucien Guillard (9 June 1906 – 25 December 1972) was a French footballer who played as a goalkeeper for Montpellier from 1928 until 1934.

== Career ==
Born in the Hérault town of Saussines on 9 June 1906, Guillard began his football career at Olympique Alès in 1927, aged 21, from which he joined Montpellier in 1928. Together with Branislav Sekulić and the Kramer brothers (Edmond, Auguste, and Georges), Guillard was a member of the Montpellier team that reached two Coupe de France finals in 1929 and 1931, keeping a clean-sheet in the former to help his side to a 2–0 victory over Sète, and conceding three goals in the latter in a 3–0 loss to Club Français. His performance in the 1929 Cup final was praised by the journalists of the French newspaper L'Auto (currently L'Équipe), who described him as "agile", "remarkably surefooted", and even made a "superb dive" to save a shot from Jacques Dormoy.

In the 1932–33 season, Guillard helped Montpellier to a fourth-place league finish. He stayed at Montpellier for six years, from 1928 until 1934, when he moved to Saint-Étienne, with whom he played 84 matches in Ligue 2 over four seasons, until 1938. In his last season at the club, Saint-Étienne finished as runners-up in Ligue 2, thus achieving promotion, but even though Guillard was "of a good standard", he was deemed insufficiently equipped for the top flight, being replaced by René Llense. He then returned to Olympique Alès, where he retired in 1939, aged 33.

== Death and legacy ==
Guillard died in Valencia on 25 December 1972, at the age of 66. The municipal stadium of Saussines was named after him.

== Honours ==
Montpellier

- Coupe de France: 1928–29; runner-up 1930–31
