= Henri Ozenne =

French footballer (1909–1991)

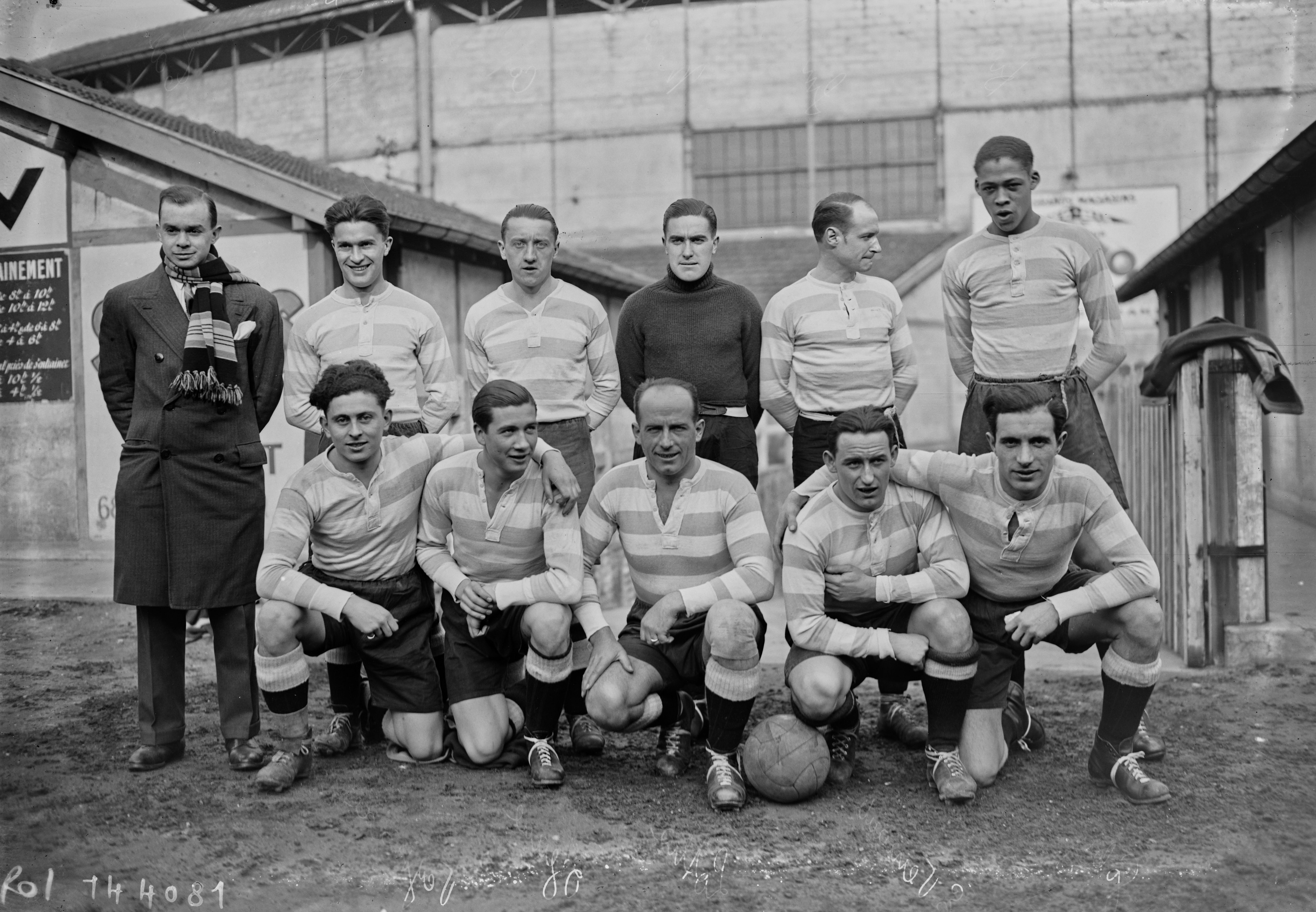
- Ozenne (crouching, second from left) in 1930

Personal information
- Date of birth: 16 November 1909
- Place of birth: 16th arrondissement of Paris, France
- Date of death: 10 May 1991 (aged 81)
- Place of death: La Rochelle, France
- Height: 1.77 m (5 ft 10 in)
- Position: Forward

Senior career*
Years	Team	Apps	(Gls)
1928–1933	RC Paris		
1933–1934	Amiens		
1934–1942	RC Paris		
1945–1946	CA Vichy		
- * Club domestic league appearances and goals

Henri Ozenne (16 November 1909 – 10 May 1991) was a French footballer who played as a forward for RC Paris and Amiens between 1928 and 1942.

== Career ==
Born on 16 November 1909 in the 16th arrondissement of Paris, Ozenne began his career at RC Paris in 1928, aged 19, where he played for 14 years, until 1942, except for the 1933–34 season, which he played for Amiens. Together with Manuel Anatol, Jean Gautheroux, and Alexandre Villaplane, he helped his side reach the 1930 Coupe de France final, which ended in a 3–1 loss to Sète. During the final, Ozenne left his outfield position to play in goal after RC Paris' goalkeeper André Tassin dislocated his shoulder, and according with the local press, he "proved equal to his task, surprising spectators and Sète players", and added that "he did his best and it was sometimes very good".

Two years later, in February 1932, Ozenne scored the only goal in a 1–0 victory over Red Star. He was described by the Mirroir des Sports as "active and fast".

Together with Auguste Jordan, Raoul Diagne, and Rodolphe Hiden, he was a member of the great RC Paris team of the late 1930s, which won the 1935–36 French Division 1, as well as two Coupe de France titles in 1936 and 1939, starting in both finals, as his side defeated Charleville (1–0) and Olympique Lillois (3–1), respectively. After the former final, the journalists of French newspaper L'Auto (the forerunner of L'Équipe) stated that "rarely served and was rather withdrawn", even though he was involved in the build-up play for the only goal of the match.

In total, he scored 42 goals in 100 official Ligue 1 matches. In 1945, he briefly came out of retirement to play for CA Vichy, then in Ligue 2, scoring 3 goals in 10 league matches.

== Death ==
Ozenne died in La Rochelle on 10 May 1991, at the age of 80.

== Honours ==
RC Paris

- Coupe de France:
  - Champions (2): 1935–36 and 1938–39
  - Runner-up (1): 1929–30
- Ligue 1:
  - Champions (1): 1935–36
