= Pierre Hornus =

French footballer (1908–1995)

Personal information
- Date of birth: 11 February 1908
- Place of birth: Mulhouse, France
- Date of death: 29 October 1995 (aged 87)
- Place of death: Mulhouse, France
- Position: Midfielder

Senior career*
| Years | Team | Apps | (Gls) |
| ?–1929 | Mulhouse | | |
| 1929–1933 | Montpellier | | |
| 1933–1938 | Mulhouse | | |

International career
| 1931 | France | 3 | (0) |
- * Club domestic league appearances and goals

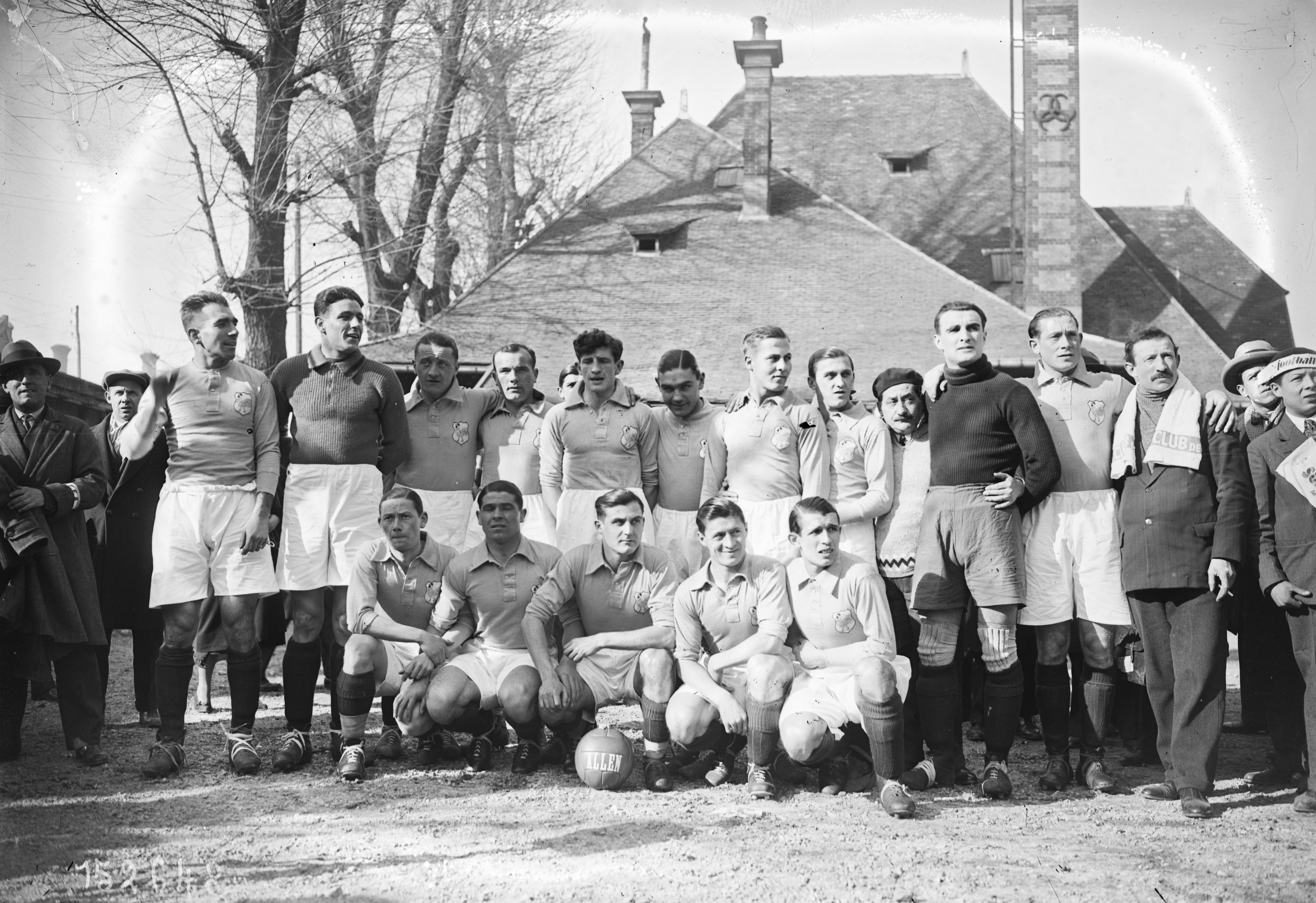
France footbl team, March 15, 1931 in Colombes, sitting of g. to d.: Anatol, Chaisaz, Capelle, Kaucsar, Finot, Chantrel, Hornus, Korb, Thépot, Mattler [and, accroupis] Monsallier, Delfour, Rolhion, L. Laurent, Langiller.

Pierre Hornus (11 February 1908 – 29 October 1995) was a French footballer who played as a midfielder for Montpellier and the French national team in the early 1930s.

== Playing career ==
=== Club career ===
Born in the Alsace town of Mulhouse on 11 February 1908, Hornus began his career at his hometown club FC Mulhouse in 1927, aged 19, from which he joined Montpellier in 1929.

Together with Branislav Sekulić and the Kramer brothers (Edmond, Auguste, and Georges), he was a member of the Montpellier team that reached the 1931 Coupe de France final, which ended in a 3–0 loss to Club Français. The following day, the journalists of the French newspaper L'Auto (the forerunner of L'Équipe) stated that "he started very badly, being hesitant and clumsy, but finished very well". At halftime, with Montpellier already three goals down, the club's fans began singing "Come on, Hornus 1!", which the press compared to a "cry of a shipwrecked man who saw the sail of salvation appearing on the horizon", adding that "Montpellier's last hopes laid indeed on Hornus", but he did not score. Notably, he was the only player in Montpellier's starting eleven who had not been born in Hérault.

In the 1932–33 season, Hornus helped Montpellier to a fourth-place league finish. He stayed at Montpellier for four years, from 1929 until 1933, when he returned to Mulhouse, with whom he played for five years, until he retired in 1938, aged 30.

=== International career ===
On 15 March 1931, the 23-year-old Hornus made his international debut in a friendly match against Germany at Colombes, helping his side to a 1–0 win. The following day, the journalists of L'Auto stated that "Hornus and Kauscar, alone, were better than the players who held their positions previously". In total, he earned three international caps for France, all in 1931.

== Death ==
Hornus died in Mulhouse on 29 October 1995, at the age of 87.

== Honours ==
Montpellier

- Coupe de France:
  - Runner-up: 1930–31
- South-Eastern League
  - Champions: 1932
