= Henri Veyssade =

French footballer (1908–1934)

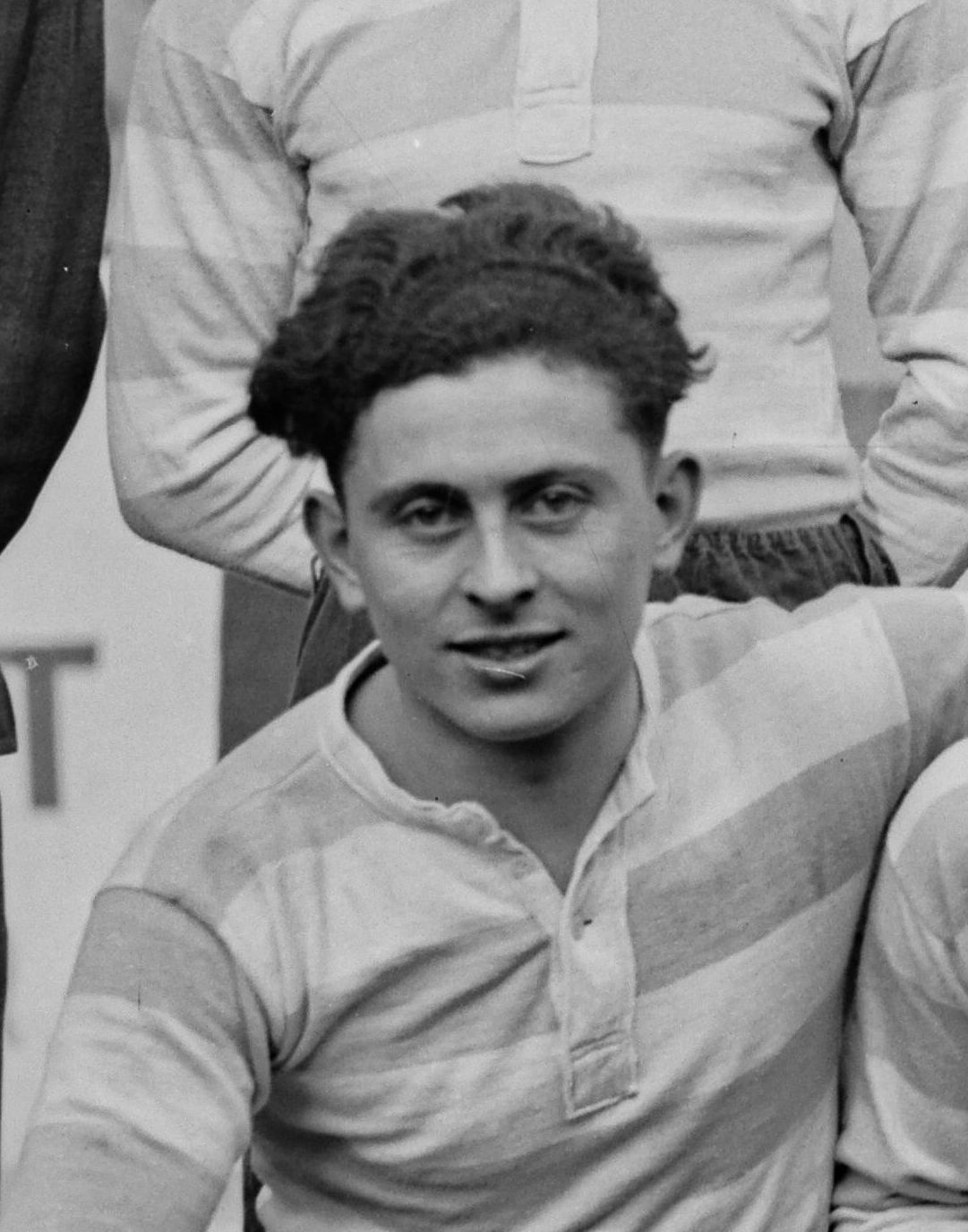
- Veyssade in 1930

Personal information
- Date of birth: 24 January 1908
- Place of birth: Meudon, France
- Date of death: 10 November 1934 (aged 26)
- Place of death: Caen, France
- Position: Winger

Senior career*
Years	Team	Apps	(Gls)
1927–1929	ÉS de Juvisy-sur-Orge		
1929–1933	RC Paris		
1933–1934	Saint-Étienne		
1934	Stade Malherbe Caen		
- * Club domestic league appearances and goals

Henri Veyssade (24 January 1908 – 10 November 1934) was a French footballer who played as a forward for RC Paris in the early 1930s.

== Career ==
Born on 24 January 1908 in the Hauts-de-Seine town of Meudon, Veyssade began his career at Étoile sportive de Juvisy-sur-Orge in 1927, aged 19, then in the Paris championship.

In 1929, Veyssade joined the ranks of RC Paris, and in his first season at the club, he helped them reach the 1930 Coupe de France final, which ended in a 3–1 loss to Sète. The following day, the journalists of the French newspaper L'Auto (the forerunner of L'Équipe) described his performance as "mediocre", although he made a shot that grazed the woodwork. Two years later, he helped Racing reach the semifinals of the 1931–32 Coupe de France, in which he did not play, being replaced by Henri Ozenne. The following season, Racing participated in the inaugural edition of the French professional championship, but Veyssade was not part of the professional team as he only played in reserve matches.

Veyssade stayed at Racing for four years, from 1929 until 1933, when he joined Saint-Étienne, with whom he played for one season before signing for Stade Malherbe Caen in 1934. A few months later, however, on 9 September 1934, in a league match against La Bastide, he sustained a foot injury and was later admitted to the hospital, where he died of tetanus on 10 November 1934.

== Honours ==
RC Paris

- Coupe de France:
  - Runner-up (1): 1929–30
