= 1931 Coupe de France final =

- Event: 1930–31 Coupe de France
Club Français	Montpellier
3	0
- Date: 3 May 1931
- Venue: Olympique Yves-du-Manoir, Colombes
- Referee: Georges Courbot
- Attendance: 30,000

The 1931 Coupe de France final was a football match held at Stade Olympique Yves-du-Manoir, Colombes on May 3, 1931, that saw Club Français defeat SO Montpellier 3–0 thanks to a goal by Miklos Boros, Arthur Parkes and Robert Mercier.

== Match details ==
3 May 1931

Club Français	3–0	Montpellier
Boros 14'; Parkes 18'; Mercier 32'

Stade Olympique Yves-du-Manoir, Colombes
Attendance: 30,000
Referee: Georges Courbot

GK	(Switzerland) Franck Séchehaye
DF	(France) Lucien Huvier (c)
DF	(England) Arthur Parkes
DF	(France) Emile Rigolet
DF	(France) Adrien Hudry
MF	(France) Georges Lopez
MF	(France) Émile Hennequin
FW	(Hungary) Miklos Boros
FW	(France) Robert ″Mercier″ Furois
FW	(France) Georges Haas
FW	(France) Pierre Miramon
Manager:
(Hungary) (Czechoslovakia) Robert Fischer Assistant Referees: Fourth Official:

GK	(France) André Guillard
DF	(France) André Boutet
DF	(France) Désiré Boutet
DF	(France) Pierre Hornus
DF	(France) René Dedieu
MF	(France) Yves Dupont
MF	(France) Charles Matte
FW	(France) Charles Cros
FW	(France) Roger Rolhion
FW	(France) Jacques Temple
FW	(France) Pierre Temple
Manager:
?

== See also ==
- 1930–31 Coupe de France
