= André Guillard =

André Guillard may refer to:

- André Guillard (v. 1495-1568), French administrator and diplomat
- André Guillard du Mortier (1517–1579), French State Councilor, ordinary master of requests of the King's hotel, and first president of the Parliament of Brittany
- André Palluel-Guillard (1940–2023), French academic and historian who specialized in Napoleonic studies
- André Guillard (footballer) (1906–1972), French footballer
