= Slobodan Milosavljević (footballer) =

Yugosvla-born French footballer and manager (1943–2025)

Personal information
- Date of birth: 1 November 1943
- Place of birth: Kragujevac, German-occupied Serbia
- Date of death: April 2025 (aged 81)
- Height: 1.80 m (5 ft 11 in)
- Positions: Forward; midfielder

Senior career*
| Years | Team | Apps | (Gls) |
| 1968–1969 | Sint-Truiden | | |
| 1969–1973 | Valenciennes | | |
| 1973–1977 | FC Sète | | |

Managerial career
- 1974–1976: FC Sète
- 1977–1985: Aurillac
- 1985–1987: FC Sète
- 1988–1989: FC Sète
- * Club domestic league appearances and goals

Slobodan Milosavljević (1 November 1943 – April 2025) was a Yugoslav-born French football player and manager who played as a forward and midfielder.

== Career ==
Milosavljević first played professionally for the Belgian club Sint-Truiden before staying in France for good with Valenciennes and FC Sète. He also coached for FC Sète and Aurillac.

Slobodan Milosavljević died in April 2025, at the age of 81.
