= Sydney Regan =

English footballer and manager

Managerial career
- Years: Team
- 1929–1933: Sète

Sydney Regan was an English football manager who led French team Sète to the 1930 Coupe de France title.
