= Stade du Petit-Bois =

Football stadium in France

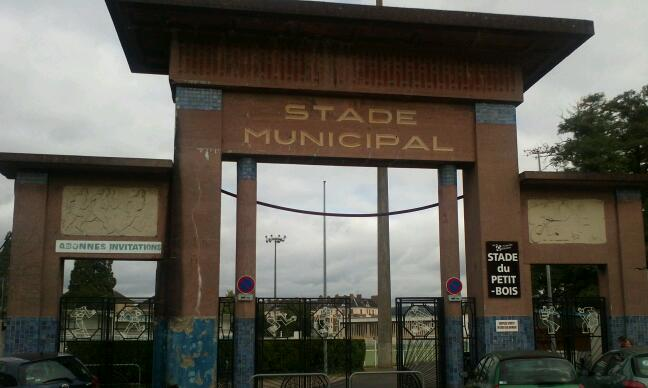

- Location within France
- Address: Rue du Petit-Bois; 08000 Charleville-Mézières, Grand Est, France
- Coordinates: 49.771°N 4.733°E
- Owner: Town of Charleville-Mézières
- Capacity: 3,000
- Opened: 15 July 1927

Tenants
- OFC Charleville

The Stade du Petit-Bois (French pronunciation: [stad dy pəti bwa]) is a multi-purpose stadium located in Charleville-Mézières, France. It is the home ground of OFC Charleville.

== History ==
The stadium was inaugurated on 15 July 1927 during the stage of the Tour de France ranging from Metz to Charleville. In 1928, the architect Jean Grey installed the reliefs that decorate the stadium entrance.

From 1927 to 1937, a stage of the Tour de France took place annually at the velodrome of the ground.

OFC Charleville play their home games at the Stade du Petit-Bois. The club has notably played in the Division 2 from 1992 and 1997. The record attendance for the stadium occurred during a Division 2 match against CS Sedan Ardennes on 2 October 1993. 5,600 people attended the match, but the home side went on to lose 3–0 to Sedan.

The Sedan-Charleville roadrace ended for several years at the stadium.
