= Marcel Tomazover =

French footballer (1915–1989)

Personal information
- Date of birth: 27 February 1915
- Place of birth: Paris, France
- Date of death: 1 January 1989 (aged 73)
- Height: 1.71 m (5 ft 7 in)
- Position: Midfielder

Senior career*
Years	Team	Apps	(Gls)
1934–1940	RC Roubaix		
1941–1950	FC Sète		

Managerial career
- 1950–1954: FC Sète
- 1954–1956: Montpellier
- 1958: Metz
- 1959–1960: Olympique Alès
- 1960–1965: FC Sète
- 1965–1966: AS Béziers
- 1967–1969: Nîmes
- 1970–1972: Red Star
- 1974–1975: Red Star
- 1977–1978: FC Sète
- * Club domestic league appearances and goals

Marcel Tomazover (27 February 1915 – 1 January 1989) was a French footballer and coach. He played his professional career as a midfielder for Roubaix and Sète, in the 1930s and 1940s, before becoming a coach. Among others, he coached Montpellier, Nîmes and Red Star.

== Honours ==
- Champion of France Zone Sud in 1942 (with FC Sète)
