= Bernard Boissier =

French footballer (born 1952)

Personal information
- Date of birth: 3 October 1952 (age 74)
- Place of birth: Nîmes, France
- Position: Defender

Senior career*
Years	Team	Apps	(Gls)
1964–1981	Nîmes Olympique	279	(6)
1981–1982	Olympique Lyonnais	36	(1)
1982–1986	Sporting Toulon Var	107	(2)
1986–1988	Le Grau-du-Roi		

International career
1975	France	1	(0)

Managerial career
- 1988–1990: Nîmes Olympique
- 2001–2002: Nîmes Olympique
- * Club domestic league appearances and goals

Bernard Boissier (born 3 October 1952) is a French former footballer.

A defender, Boissier played successively for Nîmes Olympique (from 1964 to 1981), Lyon (1981–1982), Toulon (from 1982 to 1986) and Le Grau-du-Roi (from 1986 to 1988).

On 26 April 1975, he got his first and last cap with the France national team against Portugal in a 0–2 defeat but played only for two minutes.
