= Nîmes Olympique =

French football club

Nîmes
- Full name: Nîmes Olympique
- Nickname: Les Crocodiles (The Crocodiles)
- Founded: 12 April 1937; 89 years ago
- Ground: Stade des Antonins
- Capacity: 8,033
- President: Thierry Cenatiempo
- Head coach: Hélder Esteves
- League: National 1 Group C
- 2026–26: National 2 Group C, 2nd of 16
- Website: www.nimes-olympique.com
Home colours	Away colours	Third colours

Nîmes Olympique (commonly referred to as simply Nîmes) is a French association football club based in Nîmes. The club was founded on 12 April 1937 and currently plays in the Championnat National 1, the fourth tier of French football. The Stade des Antonins is the club's home stadium.

== History ==
Initially founded in 1901 by Henri Monnier as Sporting Club Nîmois, the club's competitive history can be traced back to the Championnat Union des Sociétés Françaises de Sports Athlétiques where they won the 1908 edition of the competition in the Languedoc zone before eventually being knocked out by Olympique de Marseille 2-5. Sporting Club Nîmois was dissolved in 1935 before a continuation of the club in Nîmes Olympique was established on April 12, 1937. An article for association status for the club was accepted on 4 June 1937.

In the years following World War 2, Nîmes were promoted to the French Division 1 during the 1949-1950 season and finishing fifth in Division 1 the following season. During the 1950s, the club would see some success at domestic level, winning the Coupe Drago in 1956 in a 3–1 win over Lille and finishing runners up in Division 1 on three occasions (1957-58, 1958-59 and 1959-60). The club would fall into the French Division 2 in the 1983-84 season.

In the 1995–96 season, then playing in the third division (non-professional level), Nîmes reached the final of the Coupe de France, allowing them to compete the following year in the UEFA Cup Winners' Cup. In September 1996, in the Round of 32, Nîmes beat Budapest Honvéd (5–2 on aggregate), before losing to AIK in the next round (2–3 on aggregate).

On 5 May 2018, Nîmes secured promotion back to Ligue 1 for the first time since the 1992–93 season after finishing second in Ligue 2. In the 2018–19 season, Nîmes finished comfortably above the relegation zone in Ligue 1, placing 9th among 20 teams. In the 2020–21 Ligue 1 season, Nîmes finished second from bottom and were relegated to Ligue 2.

On 5 November 2022, Nîmes played its final match at the Stade des Costières, a 1–0 Ligue 2 victory over Bordeaux. The club would move into the Stade des Antonins on a temporary basis, before the demolition of the Stade des Costières would pave the way for the construction of the Stade Nemausus, for a projected completion in 2026. In the 2022–23 Ligue 2 season, Nîmes finished second from the bottom and were relegated to the Championnat National. In the 2024-25 Championnat National season, they finished at the bottom and were relegated once again to Championnat National 2.

== Players ==
=== Current squad ===
As of 31 January 2026

Note: Flags indicate national team as defined under FIFA eligibility rules; some limited exceptions apply. Players may hold more than one non-FIFA nationality.

No.	Pos.	Nation	Player
1	GK	FRA	Mickaël Salamone
4	DF	FRA	Pablo Martinez
5	DF	FRA	Vincent Pirès
6	MF	SEN	Mouhamed Coulibaly
7	FW	JPN	Alpha Kubota
8	MF	MAR	Charif Benhamza
9	FW	FRA	Clément Depres
10	MF	FRA	Oualid Orinel
11	DF	FRA	Diaby Doucouré
14	FW	FRA	Jared Khasa
15	DF	FRA	Gino Caoki
16	GK	FRA	Lucas Dias

No.	Pos.	Nation	Player
17	MF	FRA	Djibril Sarr
18	FW	FRA	Jules Kalczynski
19	FW	FRA	Keba Sylla
21	DF	FRA	Jean-Philippe Célestin
23	DF	FRA	Evrald Loubacky
24	FW	FRA	Bissourou Touré
25	DF	FRA	Esteban Alberto
26	FW	FRA	Najib Bennour
27	DF	FRA	Ismaël Dramé
29	DF	FRA	Moussa Diallo
30	GK	FRA	Lenny Colombani
33	MF	FRA	Marowane Khalid

=== Notable players ===
Below are the notable former players who have represented Nîmes in league and international competition since the club's foundation in 1937. To appear in the section below, a player must have played in at least 80 official matches for the club or represented the national team for which the player is eligible during his stint with Nîmes or following his departure.

For a complete list of Nîmes Olympique players, see Category:Nîmes Olympique players

France
- Jean-Pierre Adams
- William Ayache
- Ivan Bek
- Pierre Bernard
- Laurent Blanc
- Bernard Boissier
- Eric Cantona
- André Chardar
- Johann Charpenet
- Paul Chillan
- Patrick Cubaynes
- Johnny Ecker
- Jean-Marc Ferratge
- Jordan Ferri
- Kader Firoud
- René Girard
- Edmond Haan
- Mahi Khennane
- Maurice Lafont
- Michel Mézy
- Jacky Novi
- Christian Perez
- Frédéric Piquionne
- Benoît Poulain
- Bernard Rahis
- Téji Savanier
- Henri Skiba
- Joseph Ujlaki
- Philippe Vercruysse
- Jacky Vergnes
- Alexandre Villaplane
- Anthony Vosahlo

Algeria

- Omar Belbey
- Ali Boulebda
- Rabah Gamouh
- Mahi Khennane
- Faouzi Mansouri
- Djamel Menad
- Mehdi Mostefa
- Abder Ramdane
- Amokrane Oualiken
- Abderraouf Zarabi

Argentina

- José Luis Cuciuffo
- Jorge Domínguez (footballer)
- José Daniel Ponce

Austria

- Heinz Schilcher

Belgium

- Roger Van Gool

Benin

- Mouritala Ogunbiyi
- Steve Mounié

Bosnia and Herzegovina

- Mehmed Baždarević

Burkina Faso

- Issouf Ouattara

Cameroon

- Benjamin Moukandjo

Central African Republic

- Eloge Enza-Yamissi
- Manassé Enza-Yamissi

Comoros

- Mohamed M'Changama

Côte d'Ivoire

- Guy Demel

Croatia

- Darko Vukić

Czechoslovakia

- Adolf Scherer
- Dušan Tittel

Democratic Republic of Congo

- Alain Masudi

Denmark

- Kristen Nygaard

Gabon

- Denis Bouanga

Ghana

- Arthur Moses

Greece

- Panagiotis Vlachodimos

Hungary

- Vilmos Kohut

Liberia

- Edward Weah Dixon

Macedonia

- Milko Gjurovski
- Vlatko Stojanovski

Mali

- Dramane Coulibaly
- Alphousseyni Keita
- Moussa Sidibé

Mauritania

- Moïse Kandé

Morocco

- Hassan Akesbi
- Rachid Alioui
- Adil Hermach
- Hassan Kachloul
- Mohammed Mahroufi
- Mustapha Merry

Netherlands

- Ton Lokhoff
- Jan Poortvliet

Nigeria

- Wilson Oruma

Norway

- Birger Meling

Palestine

- Imad Zatara

Paraguay

- Andrés Cubas
- Sebastián Fleitas
- José Parodi

Poland

- Jan Domarski
- Stanisław Karwat

Republic of the Congo

- Ladislas Douniama
- François Makita

Republic of Ireland

- Jacko McDonagh

Romania

- Ion Pârcălab
- Florea Voinea

Scotland

- Alec Cheyne
- Andrew Wilson

Senegal

- Aliou Cissé
- Lamine Sakho
- Mamadou Seck

Serbia

- Nenad Kovačević

Slovakia

- Dušan Tittel

Sweden

- Niclas Eliasson

Togo

- Komlan Amewou
- Jonathan Ayité
- Robert Malm

Yugoslavia

- Ivan Bek
- Milko Gjurovski
- Josip Pirmajer
- Fadil Vokrri

== Coaches ==
- Vilmos Kohut (1939–40)
- Marcel Gebelin (1940–42)
- Louis Gabrillargues (1942–46)
- René Dedieu (1946–48)
- Pierre Pibarot (1948–55)
- Kader Firoud (1955–64)
- Pierre Pibarot (1964–67)
- Marcel Rouvière (1967)
- Marcel Tomazover (1967–69)
- Kader Firoud (1969–78)
- Henri Noël (1978–82)
- Pierre Barlaguet (1982–84)
- Marcel Domingo (1984–86)
- Kristen Nygaard (1986–87)
- Jean Sérafin (1987–88)
- Bernard Boissier (1988–90)
- Daniel Romeo (1990–91)
- René Girard (1991–92)
- Michel Mézy (1992)
- Léonce Lavagne (1992–93)
- Michel Mézy (1993)
- René Exbrayat (1993–94)
- Josip Skoblar (1994)
- René Girard (1994)
- Pierre Barlaguet (1994–96)
- Pierre Mosca (1996–99)
- Serge Delmas (1999–00)
- Dominique Bathenay (2000)
- Bernard Boissier (2001–02)
- François Brisson and Armand Sene (2002–03)
- Patrick Champ (2003)
- Didier Ollé-Nicole (2003–05)
- Régis Brouard (2005–07)
- Laurent Fournier (2007)
- Jean-Luc Vannuchi (2007–08)
- Jean-Michel Cavalli (2008–10)
- Noël Tosi (2010–11)
- Thierry Froger (2011–12)
- Victor Zvunka (2012–13)
- René Marsiglia (2013–14)
- José Pasqualetti (2014–15)
- Bernard Blaquart (2015–20)
- Jérôme Arpinon (2020–21)
- Pascal Plancque (2021–22)
- Nicolas Usaï (2022)
- Frédéric Bompard (2022–2024)
- Adil Hermach (2024–present)

== Honours ==
=== League ===
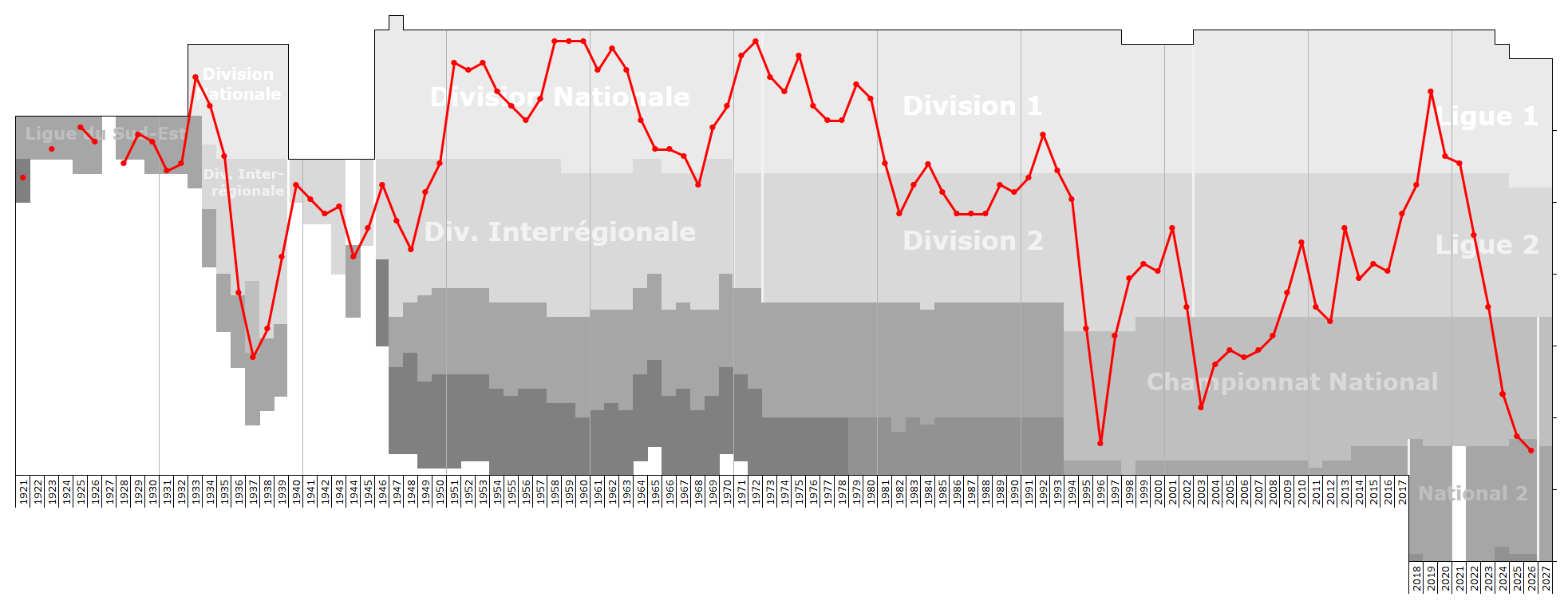
Historical league performance chart of Nîmes Olympique

- Ligue 1
  - Runners-up: 1958, 1959, 1960, 1972
- Ligue 2
  - Champions: 1950
  - Runners-up: 2018
- Championnat National
  - Champions: 1997, 2012

=== Cup ===
- Coupe de France
  - Runners-up: 1957–58, 1960–61, 1995–96
- Trophée des Champions
  - Runners-up: 1958
- Coppa delle Alpi
  - Champions: 1972
- Coupe Charles Drago
  - Champions: 1956
- Coupe Gambardella
  - Champions: 1961, 1966, 1969, 1977
