= David Harrison (footballer) =

English football manager

Personal information
- Full name: David William Harrison

Managerial career
- Years: Team
- 1931–1934: Stade Reims

David William Harrison was an English professional football manager who coached French team Stade Reims between 1931 and 1934.
