= Alexandre Villaplane =

French footballer and Nazi collaborator (1904–1944)

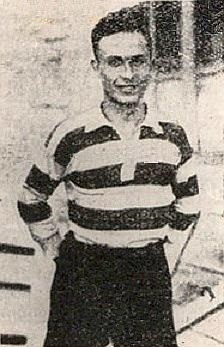

Personal information
- Date of birth: 24 December 1904
- Place of birth: Algiers, French Algeria
- Date of death: 27 December 1944 (aged 40)
- Place of death: Fort de Montrouge, Arcueil, France
- Height: 1.73 m (5 ft 8 in)
- Position: Midfielder

Senior career*
Years	Team	Apps	(Gls)
1921–1923	FC Sète	120	(82)
1923–1924	UC Vergèze		
1924–1927	FC Sète		
1927–1929	Nîmes		
1929–1931	RC Paris		
1931–1933	FC Antibes		
1933–1934	Nice		
1934–1935	Hispano-Bastidienne		

International career
1926–1930	France	25	(12)
Criminal information
Status	Executed by firing squad
Conviction	Treason
Penalty	Death
- * Club domestic league appearances and goals

Alexandre Villaplane (24 December 1904 – 27 December 1944) was a French football player who played as a midfielder. He appeared in the France national team in the 1928 Summer Olympics and captained the national team at the 1930 FIFA World Cup. Villaplane was also a Nazi collaborator who was arrested and executed for his actions during World War II.

== Football career ==
In his career he appeared for Sète (1921–1923 and 1924–1927), UC Vergèze (1923–1924), Nîmes (1927–1929), Racing Club de Paris (1929–1932), Antibes (1932–1933), Nice (1933–1934), and Hispano-Bastidienne (1934–1935). He was capped 25 times for the France national team, played for the France national team at the 1928 Summer Olympics, and was the captain of the France national team at the 1930 FIFA World Cup. At the latter he earned the accolade, which was considered to him, at the time, the greatest moment of his career.

He played for Antibes in the first French professional championship in 1932–33. The League was divided into a Northern and a Southern section with each section made up of ten teams. Antibes finished top of the table in the Southern section and played Lille from the North for the Championship. Antibes won the match and the French league but were stripped of their title after being found guilty of match-fixing. The Lille manager was given a lifetime ban, but Villaplane, who was strongly suspected of fixing the matches, received only a small penalty. Villaplane then joined OGC Nice for the 1933–34 season. Having lost interest in his career and having become a regular horse race-goer, he made one last attempt to resurrect his career with the Bordeaux Second Division club Hispano-Bastidienne, but he ended the season in prison, having been sentenced for his part in a horse race-fixing scandal.

== Criminal career ==
At the beginning of World War II, Villaplane became involved in the Parisian black market and in racketeering the local Jewish population. He was sentenced in 1940 to two months imprisonment for possession of stolen goods. Through his criminal background, he came to the attention of the French Carlingue, an organisation formed by the German Reich Security Main Office to conduct counter-insurgency operations against the French Resistance. The group, which was made up of collaborating criminals, was known colloquially as the French Gestapo. It was jointly run by two Parisian gangsters, Henri Lafont and Pierre Bonny. Members utilised their criminal expertise and networks for the Nazi security services in occupied France and Vichy. Villaplane specialised in racketeering gold merchants.

In 1942, he left Paris for Toulouse to escape the Germans. His former teammate Louis Cazal obtained new identity papers for him and he returned to Paris. He was arrested by the SS in 1943 for the theft of a quantity of precious stones and imprisoned at the Compiègne camp; Lafont succeeded in obtaining his release.

Villaplane then became Bonny's chauffeur and then, in 1944, head of one of the five sections of the North African Brigade, a criminal organization made up of North African immigrants who collaborated with the Nazis through anti-Resistance activities. The fierce character of his recruits earned him the unflattering nickname of "SS Mohammed". He obtained both the rank and uniform of an SS-Untersturmführer. The unit was placed at the disposal of the Gestapo chief in Michaël Hambrecht, who reported to the Limoges branch under the command of August Meier. His section was put in charge of finding Resistance members and their supporters in the region of Périgueux in the month of March 1944, and then in the region of Eymet in the following month. It was in Eymet that he negotiated for the lives of over 50 hostages for money. On 11 June 1944, the day following the massacre at Oradour-sur-Glane, by Adolf Diekmann his squad had 52 people executed in Mussidan, with claims that Villaplane himself was also involved with the shootings at hand.

== Execution ==
He was sentenced to death on 1 December 1944 for his direct involvement in at least 10 killings. He was executed by firing squad on 27 December 1944 at the Fort de Montrouge, Arcueil, three days after his 40th birthday. His execution was alongside corrupt policeman Pierre Bonny and career criminal Henri Lafont.
