= Manuel Anatol =

Footballer and athlete (1903–1990)

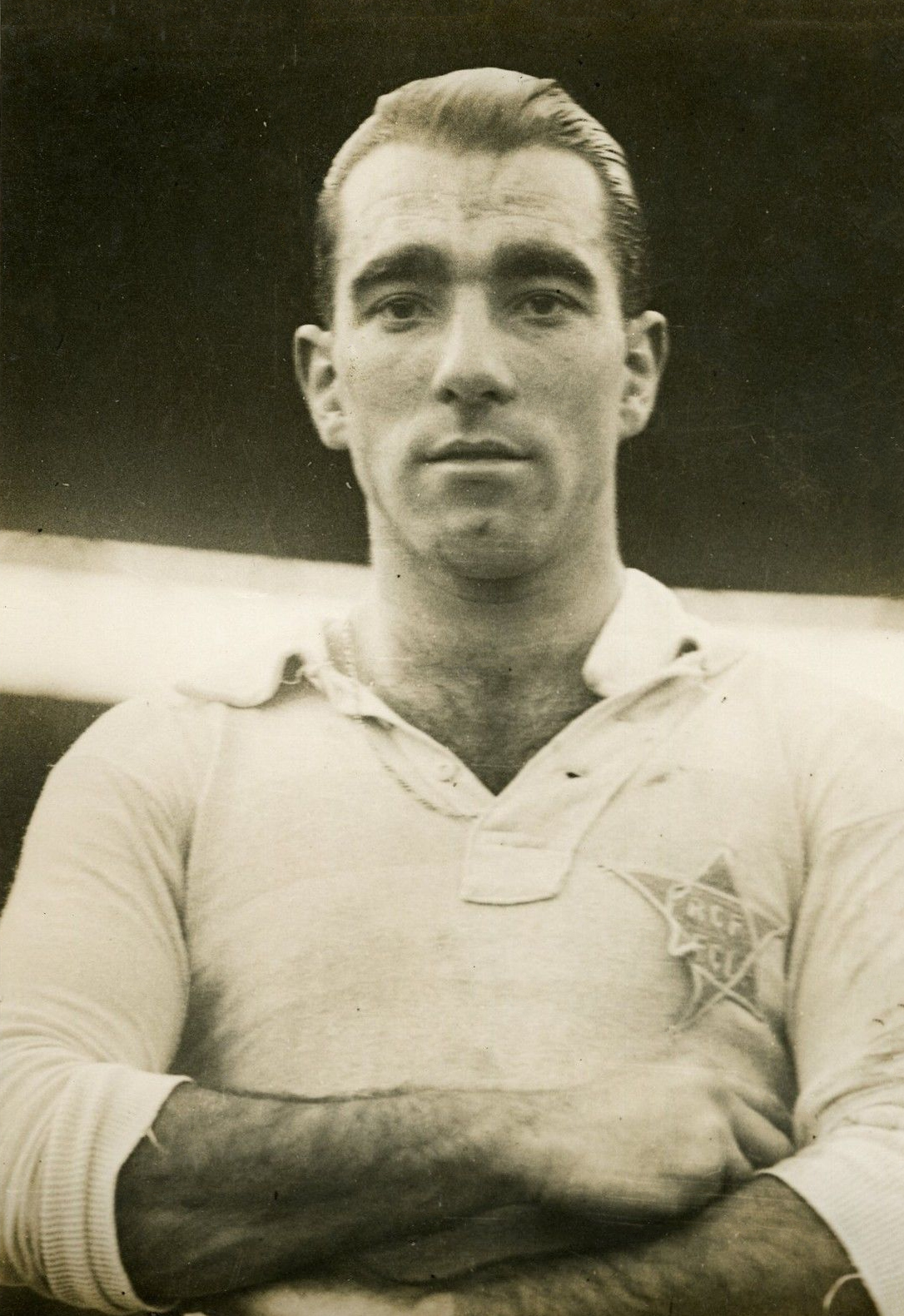
- Anatol in 1932

Personal information
- Full name: Manuel Anatol Aristegi
- Date of birth: 8 May 1903
- Place of birth: Irun, Spain
- Date of death: 17 May 1990 (aged 87)
- Position: Defender

Senior career*
| Years | Team | Apps | (Gls) |
| 1920–1922 | Real Unión | | |
| 1922–1923 | Gimnástica Española | | |
| 1923–1926 | Real Unión | | |
| 1926–1928 | Athletic Bilbao | | |
| 1928–1929 | Real Madrid CF | | |
| 1929–1932 | Racing Paris | | |
| 1932–1933 | Athletic Madrid | 7 | (0) |
| 1933–1934 | Montpellier HSC | | |
| 1934–1935 | Racing Paris | | |

International career
| 1929–1934 | France | 16 | (1) |
- * Club domestic league appearances and goals

Manuel Anatol Aristegi (8 May 1903 – 17 May 1990) was a naturalized French professional footballer and athlete.

== Football career ==
Anatol was born in Irun, a town in the Basque Country of Spain. A defender, he played for three clubs in the country; hometown club Real Unión and Athletic Bilbao. In 1929, Anatol ventured to France and joined Racing Paris. With Racing, he captained the club to the final of the Coupe de France in his second season with the club. In the final, Racing were defeated 3–1 by FC Sète.

Initially overlooked due to his Spanish roots (as was René Petit), Anatol was naturalised as a French citizen in 1929 and made his national team debut on 24 March 1929 in a 2–0 victory over Portugal. He made 15 more appearances with the team and scored his only goal on 23 March 1930 in a 3–3 draw with Switzerland. The goal was scored from 40 metres (44 yd) out. He could not take part in the 1930 FIFA World Cup due to being unable to take the required time off work, and was not selected for the France squad four years later.

== Athletics career ==
Anatol was also a talented sprinter who won the 100 metres, 200 metres, 400 metres and 4 × 400 metres relay events at the 1923 edition of the Spanish Athletics Championships; however, as he had documentation as a French national (his father was from the French Basque Country although Manuel had lived in Spain all his life up to that point) the wins were awarded to the runners-up instead, and remain as such in the records. He subsequently competed at the 1924 Summer Olympics under the name M. A. Aristegui which may have been an administrative error due to Spanish naming customs, or a subtle attempt by him to conceal his identity from either the athletics organisers or the management at his football club. He did not progress past the opening heats of the 400 metres event.
