= Auguste Kramer =

Swiss footballer (1901–1971)

Personal information
- Full name: Auguste Louis Kramer
- Date of birth: 12 March 1901
- Place of birth: Colombier, Neuchâtel, Switzerland
- Date of death: 8 July 1971 (aged 70)
- Place of death: Geneva, Switzerland
- Position: Forward

Senior career*
Years	Team	Apps	(Gls)
?–1924	Biel-Bienne		
1924–1927	Gallia Club Lunel		
1927–1930	Montpellier		
1930–1932	Nîmes		
1934–1935	Villeurbanne		

International career
1924	Switzerland	1	(0)
- * Club domestic league appearances and goals

Auguste Louis Kramer (12 March 1901 – 8 July 1971) was a Swiss footballer who played as a forward for Montpellier and the Swiss national team in the 1920s.

== Playing career ==
Auguste Kramer was born in Colombier, Neuchâtel, on 12 March 1901, as the son of Auguste Kramer-Dubuisson. Kramer was playing for Biel-Bienne when he earned his first (and only) caps for Switzerland in a friendly against Denmark in Basel on 21 April 1924, helping his side to a 2–0 victory. Two of his brothers, Edmond and Georges, were also Swiss internationals, and all of them went on to play in France.

A few months later, Kramer moved to France, where he joined the ranks of Gallia Club Lunel, where he reunited with Edmond, and later Georges, who came from Sète. They stayed there for three years, until 1927, when they were signed by Montpellier. The Kramer brothers get along wonderfully, becoming the driving force behind the Montpellier team that won 1929 Coupe de France final at Colombes, with Auguste and Edmond scoring the goals of a 2–0 victory over Sète. In the build-up to the final, Georges was suffering from jaundice, while Edmond was recovering from a muscle strain, but Auguste had just scored in each of the previous five rounds for a total of 12 of his team's 22 goals, including the opening goal of the final, which he scored after overcoming the tight marking from captain William Barrett.

After leaving Montpellier in 1930, Kramer joined SC Nîmes, with whom he played for two seasons, until 1932, and later played one last season at Villeurbanne in 1934–35.

== Death ==
In 1945, Kramer was residing in Geneva, where he died on 8 July 1971, at the age of 70.

== Honours ==
Montpellier

- Coupe de France:
  - Champions (1): 1928–29
- Ligue du Sud-Est DH
  - Champions (1): 1928
