= Souesmes =

- Commune
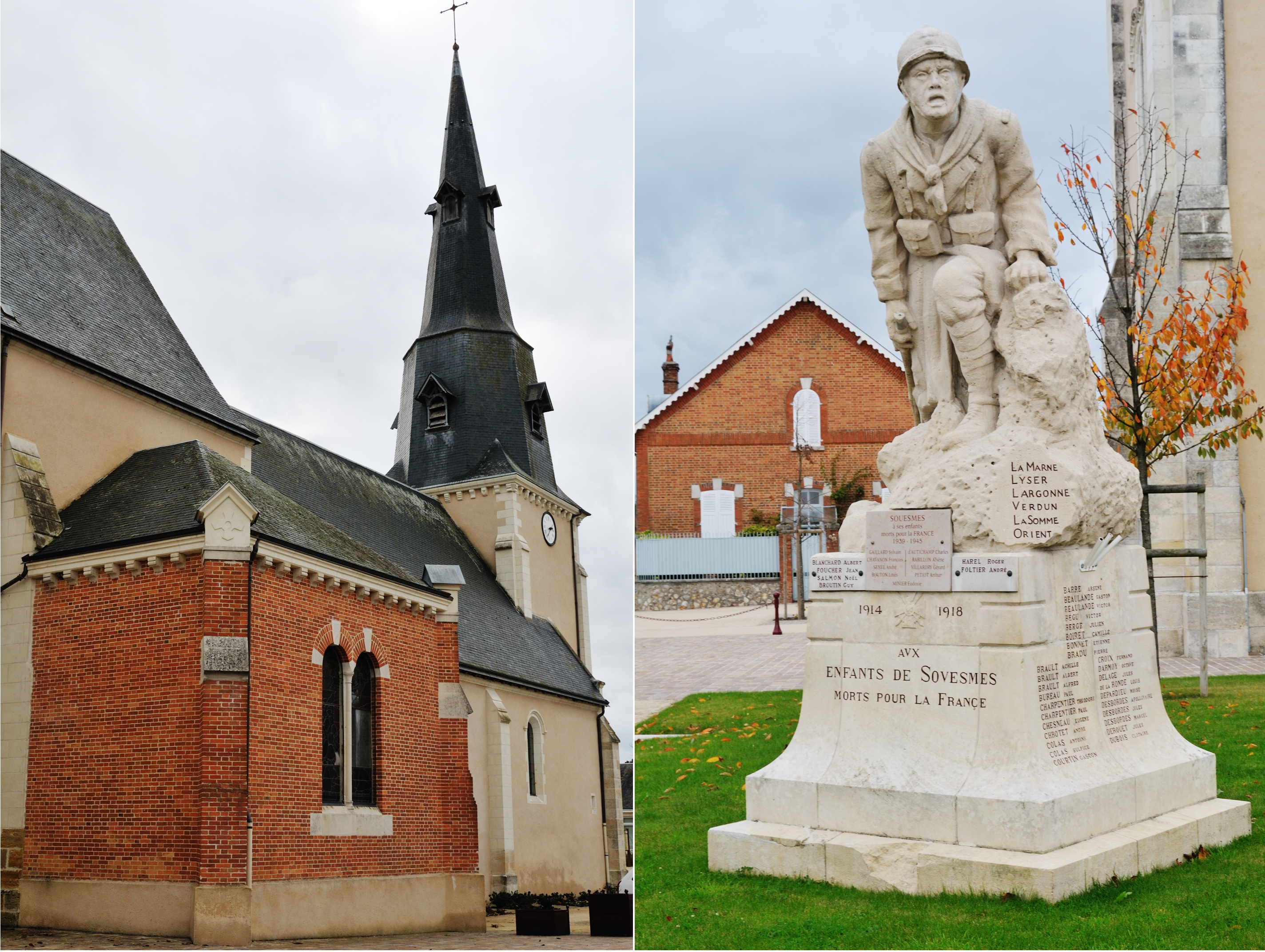
- Church of Saint-Julien and the war memorial

- Coat of arms
- Location of Souesmes
- Location within France Location within Centre-Val de Loire
- Coordinates: 47°27′34″N 2°10′48″E
- Country: France
- Region: Centre-Val de Loire
- Department: Loir-et-Cher
- Arrondissement: Romorantin-Lanthenay
- Canton: La Sologne
- Intercommunality: La Sologne des rivières

Government
  - Mayor (2020–2026): Jean-Michel Dezelu
- Area^{1}: 99.5 km^{2} (38.4 sq mi)
- Elevation: 127 m (417 ft)
- Highest elevation: 158 m (518 ft)
- Lowest elevation: 105 m (344 ft)
- Population (2023): 999
  - Density: 10.0/km^{2} (26.0/sq mi)
- Time zone: UTC+01:00 (CET)
  - Summer (DST): UTC+02:00 (CEST)
- INSEE/Postal code: 41249 /41300
- ^{1} French Land Register data, which excludes lakes, ponds, glaciers > 1 km^{2} (0.386 sq mi or 247 acres) and river estuaries.

Souesmes (French pronunciation: [swɛm]) is a commune in the Loir-et-Cher department in central France.

== Landmarks ==
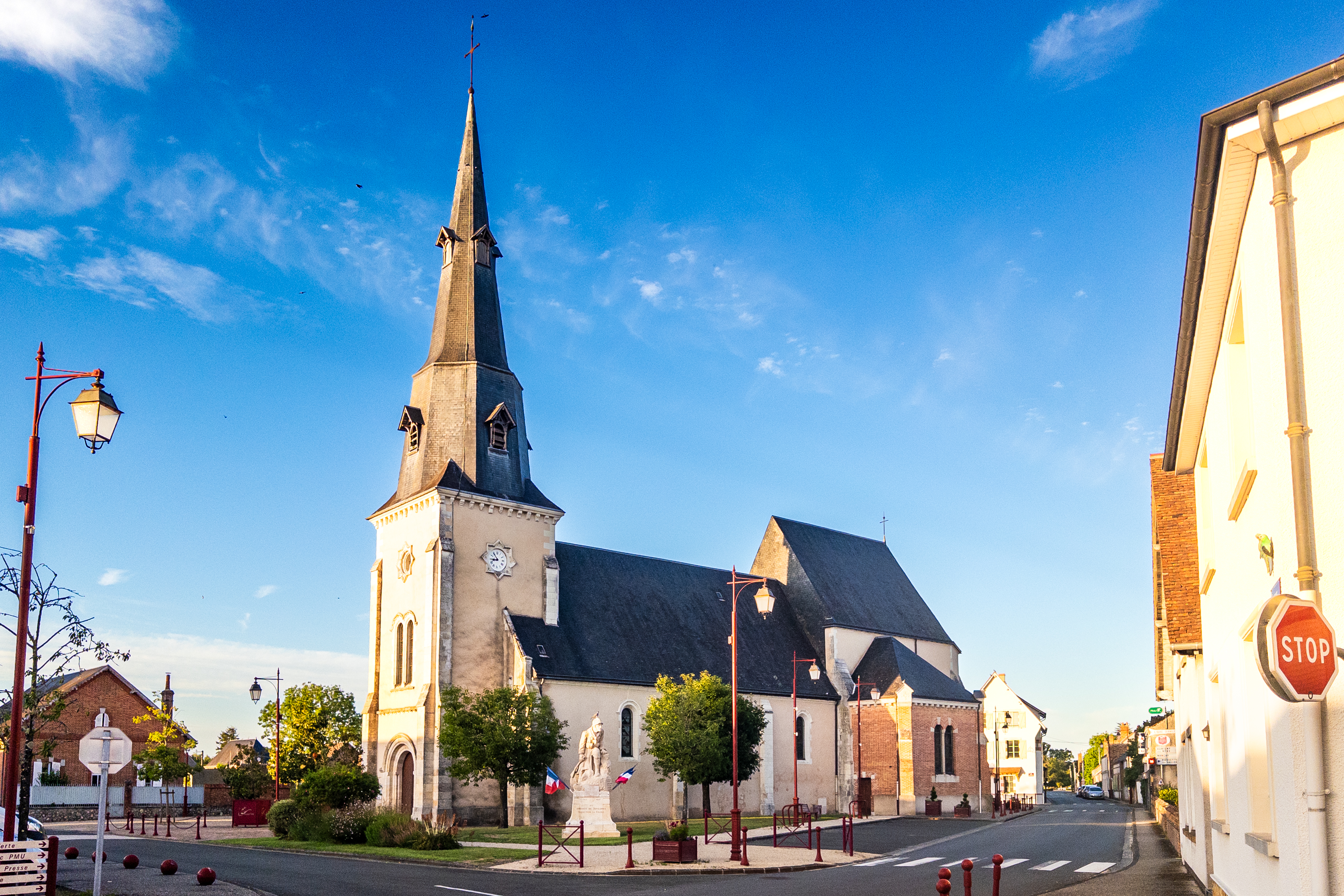
The Church of Saint-Julien in Souesmes

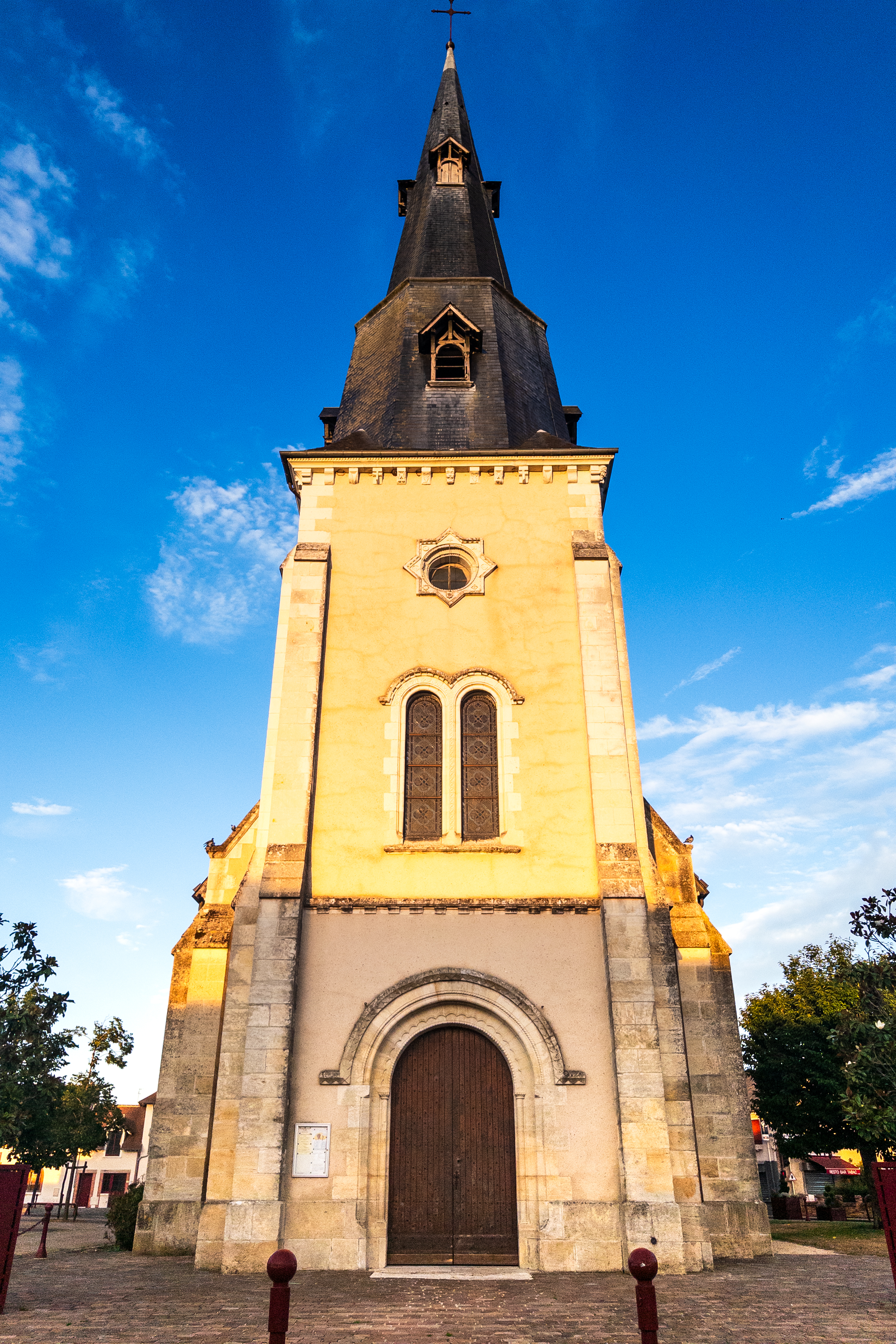
The bell tower of the Church of Saint-Julien

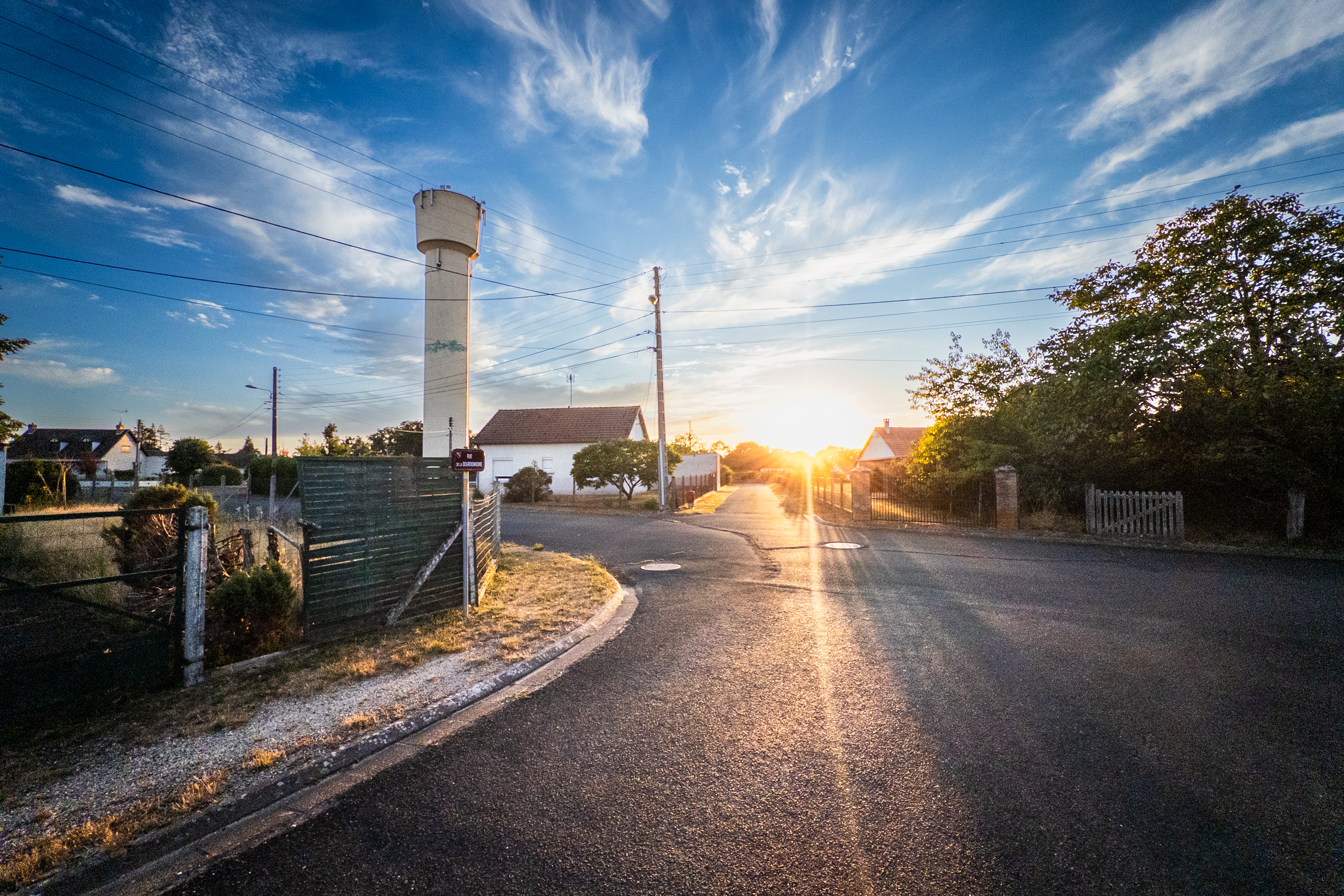
The water tower ("Château d’eau") of Souesmes

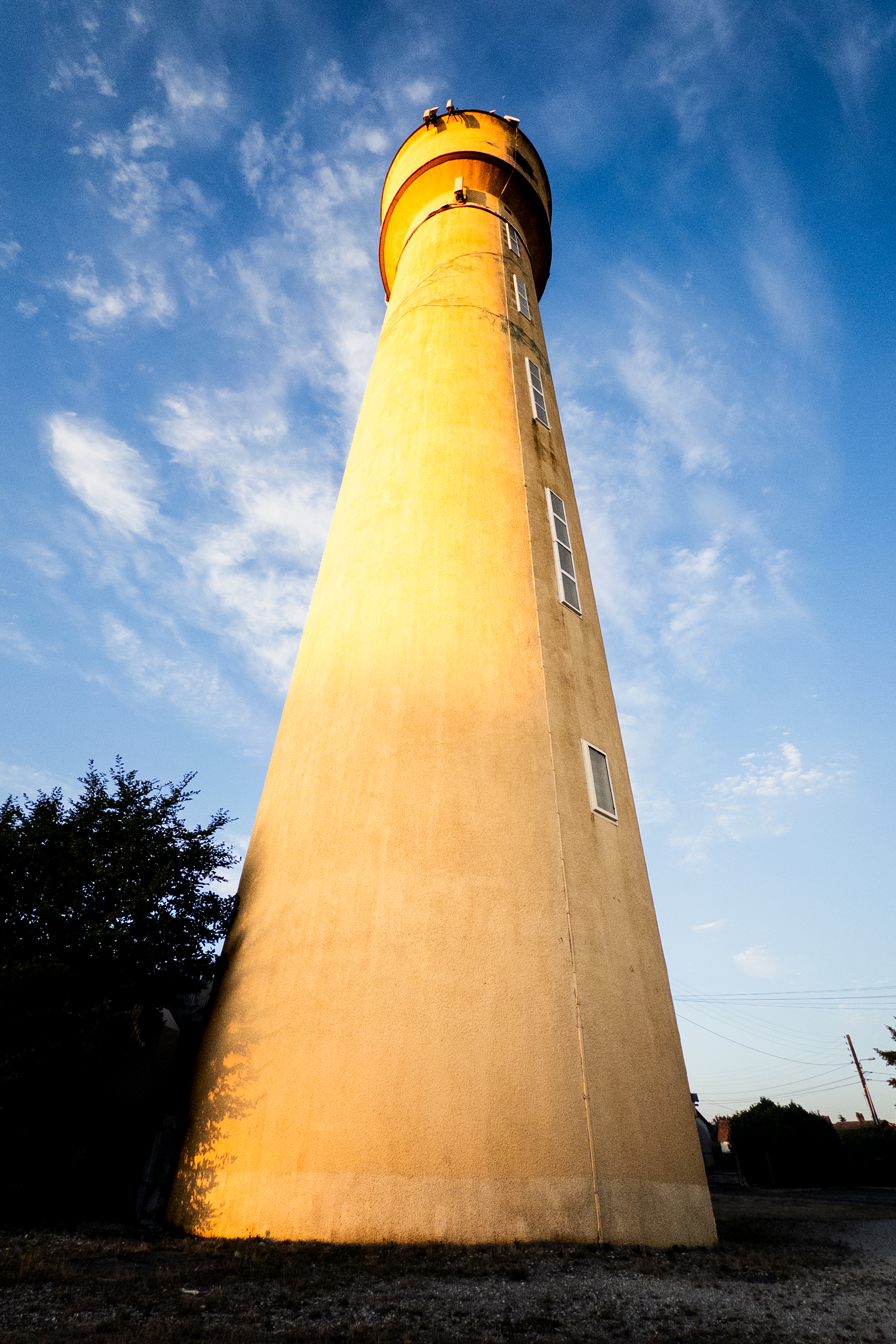
The water tower ("Château d’eau") of Souesmes

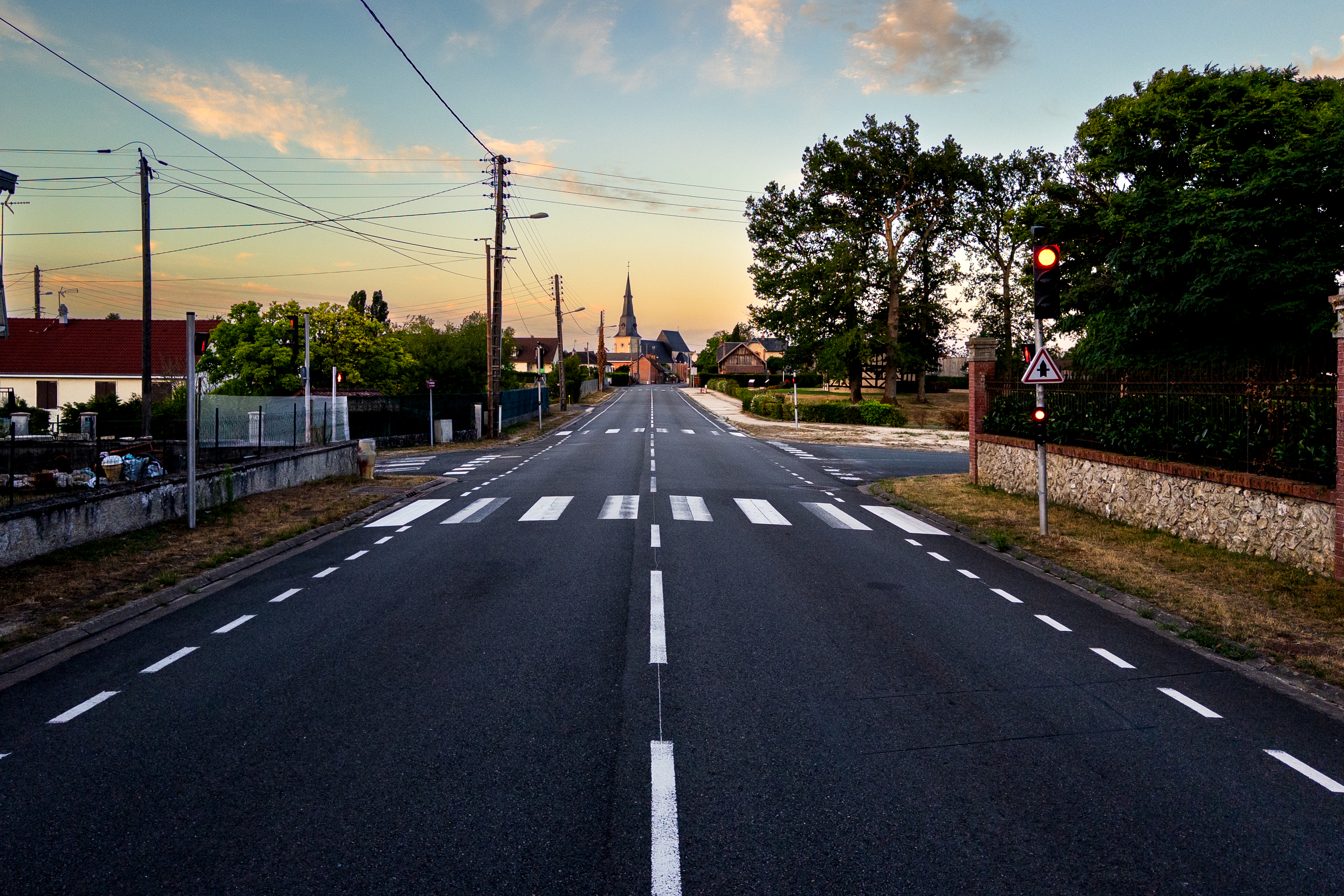
Avenue du 11 Novembre in Souesmes

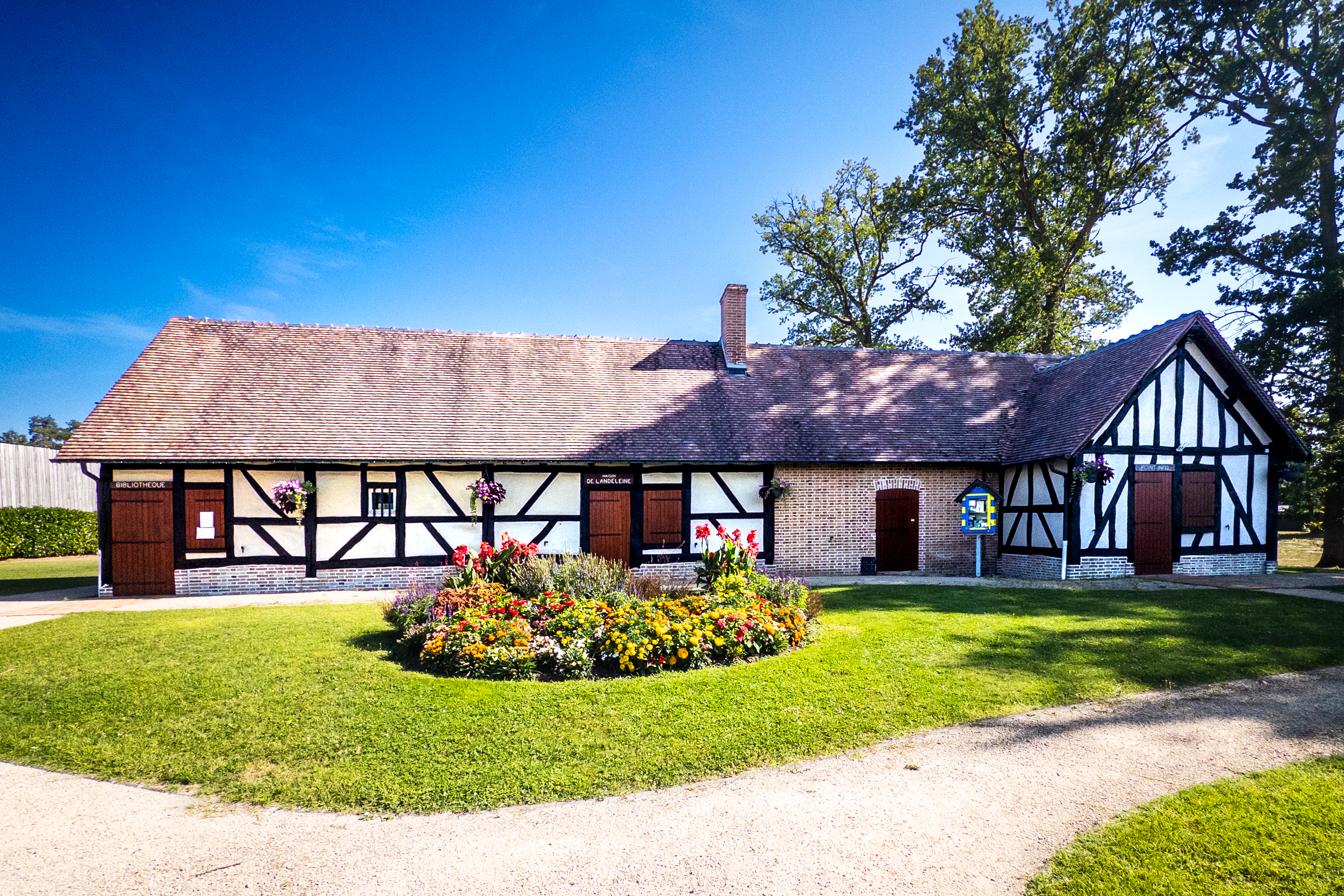
The library ("Maison de Landeleine") of Souesmes

== Population ==
Historical population
Year	Pop.	±% p.a.
1968	1,125	—
1975	1,060	−0.85%
1982	1,122	+0.82%
1990	1,135	+0.14%
1999	1,115	−0.20%
2007	1,114	−0.01%
2012	1,120	+0.11%
2017	1,059	−1.11%
2023	999	−0.97%
Source: INSEE

== See also ==
- Communes of the Loir-et-Cher department
