= Georges Kramer =

Swiss footballer and manager (born 1898)

Personal information
- Date of birth: 1898
- Place of birth: Colombier, Switzerland
- Position: Striker

Senior career*
Years	Team	Apps	(Gls)
1915–1919	Cantonal Neuchâtel		
1919–1920	Neuchâtel Xamax		
1920–1921	Grasshopper Club Zürich		
1921–1922	Biel-Bienne		
1922–1923	FC Cette		
1923–1927	Gallia Club Lunel		
1927–1930	SO Montpellier		
1931–1932	SC Nîmes		
1933–1934	FC Lyon		
1934–1935	AS Villeurbanne		

International career
1920–1921	Switzerland	5	(1)

Managerial career
- 1945–1946: FC Martigues
- 1946–1948: SO Montpellier
- * Club domestic league appearances and goals

Georges Kramer (born 1898) was a Swiss footballer and coach.

== Biography ==
Georges Kramer, like his brothers Auguste and Edmond, was a Swiss international, before continuing his career in France.

He made his debut for FC Cantonal Neuchâtel, ancestor of Neuchâtel Xamax FC, before playing for Grasshopper-Club Zurich, and then FC Bienne.

He left Bienne to join FC Cette in 1922. With the Dauphins, he took part in an exceptional season, winning the Championship from the Ligue du Sud Est and reaching the final of the Coupe de France. However, he was involved in an infamous "affair" in 1923. The sétois club, before the advent of professionalism in French football, were accused of shamateurism.

Georges Kramer left for Gallia Club Lunel, a team who aspired to play in the highest levels of the league. He joined the club, in 1924, with his two brothers. He was also joint manager with French international Fernand Brunel.

The three Kramer brothers also left for SO Montpellier. The number of foreign players were limited to three per team to play in the Coupe de France, so Georges took French citizenship. He played in the Coupe de France in 1929, against the team's great rival of the time, FC Sète. The brothers Auguste and Edmond Kramer scored two goals in the win.

== Honours ==
- Swiss Champion in 1916 with Cantonal Neuchâtel and in 1921 with Grasshopper Club Zürich
- Finalist of the Coupe de France 1923 with FC Cette
- Champion of the Ligue du Sud-Est DH in 1923 with FC Cette and in 1928 with SO Montpellier
- Winner of the Coupe de France in 1929 with SO Montpellier
