= Roger Rolhion =

French footballer (1909–?)

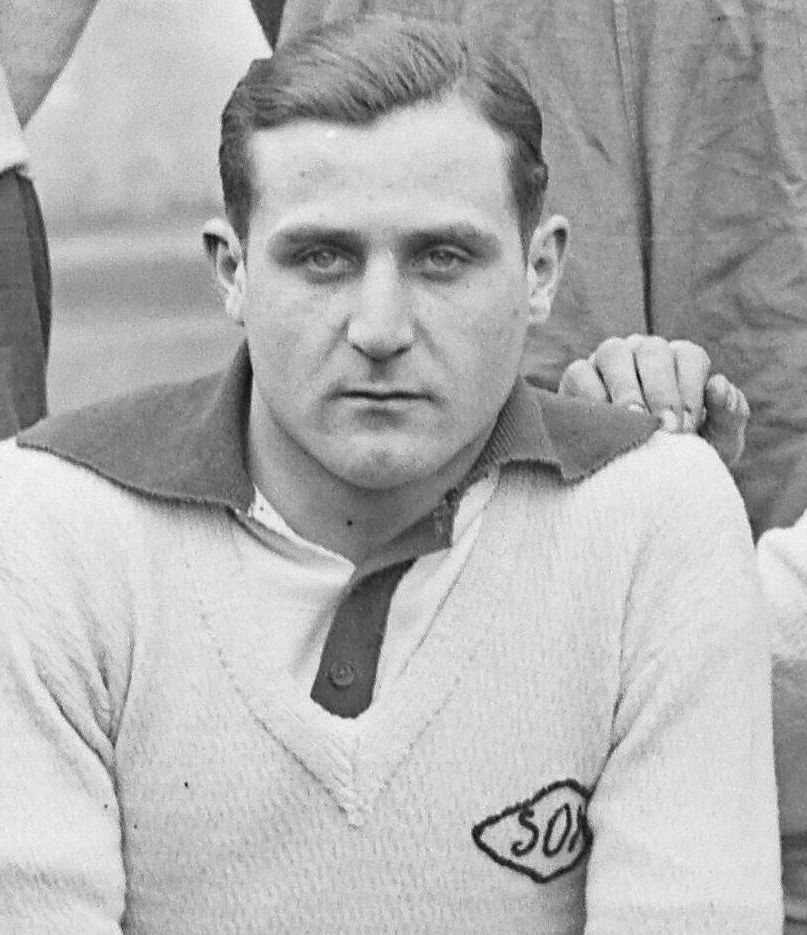

Personal information
- Date of birth: 4 January 1909
- Place of birth: Montpellier, France
- Positions: Striker; defender

Senior career*
Years	Team	Apps	(Gls)
1928–1935	Montpellier		
1935–1940	Saint-Étienne		
1942–1943	Saint-Étienne		
1943–1944	EF Lyon Lyonnais		
- Ganges
- AS Aix

International career
1931–1933	France	4	(2)

Managerial career
- AS Aix
- 1954–1956: Marseille
- 1968–1969: Montpellier
- * Club domestic league appearances and goals

Roger Rolhion (born 4 January 1909, date of death unknown) was a French football player and coach.

== Career ==
Rolhion was born in Montpellier, Hérault. He made his debut as a player for his local club, SO Montpellier with whom he won the Coupe de France in 1929.

He played three internationals as a striker and once as a defender.

Later, Rolhion became a manager, coaching AS Aix-en-Provence, Olympique de Marseille and SO Montpellier.

== Honours ==
=== Player ===
SO Montpellier

- Coupe de France 1929; runner-up 1931
- Ligue du Sud-Est: 1932

== Sources ==
- Player page at the site of the FFF
- Player page at anciensverts.com
- Coach page at om1899.com
- Alain Pécheral, La Grande histoire de l'OM (Des origines à nos jours), L'Équipe, 2007. cf. page 443.
- Roger Rolhion at WorldFootball.net
