= André Chardar =

French footballer (1906-1993)

Personal information
- Full name: André Chardar
- Date of birth: 7 October 1906
- Place of birth: Buenos Aires, Argentina
- Date of death: 13 April 1993 (aged 86)
- Position: Defender

Youth career
- 1919–1925: CA Paris

Senior career*
Years	Team	Apps	(Gls)
1925–1926	US Juvisy	–	(–)
1926–1933	Sète	–	(–)
1933–1935	SC Nîmes	–	(–)
1935–1936	Valenciennes	–	(–)
1936	Alès	–	(–)
1936–1938	Racing Paris	–	(–)

International career
1930–1933	France	12	(1)

Managerial career
- US Métro
- CA Paris
- * Club domestic league appearances and goals

André Chardar (7 October 1906 – 13 April 1993) was a French international footballer.

== Career ==
Chardar was born in Buenos Aires in Argentina to French parents. While growing up in the country, he drew in interest to the sport of football and, after his family return to France, joined CA Paris at the age of 13. After spending six years with the club as a youth, Chardar joined US Juvisy. He only spent a season at the club before moving to Sète where he achieved most of his success. With Sète, Chardar won the Coupe de France in 1930 and established himself as a French international. After departing Sète in 1933, he played for a host of clubs before ending his career with Racing Paris in 1938. Chardar later moved into the managerial role engaging in coaching stints with US Métro and his former club CA Paris.
