= André Tassin =

French footballer (1902-1986)

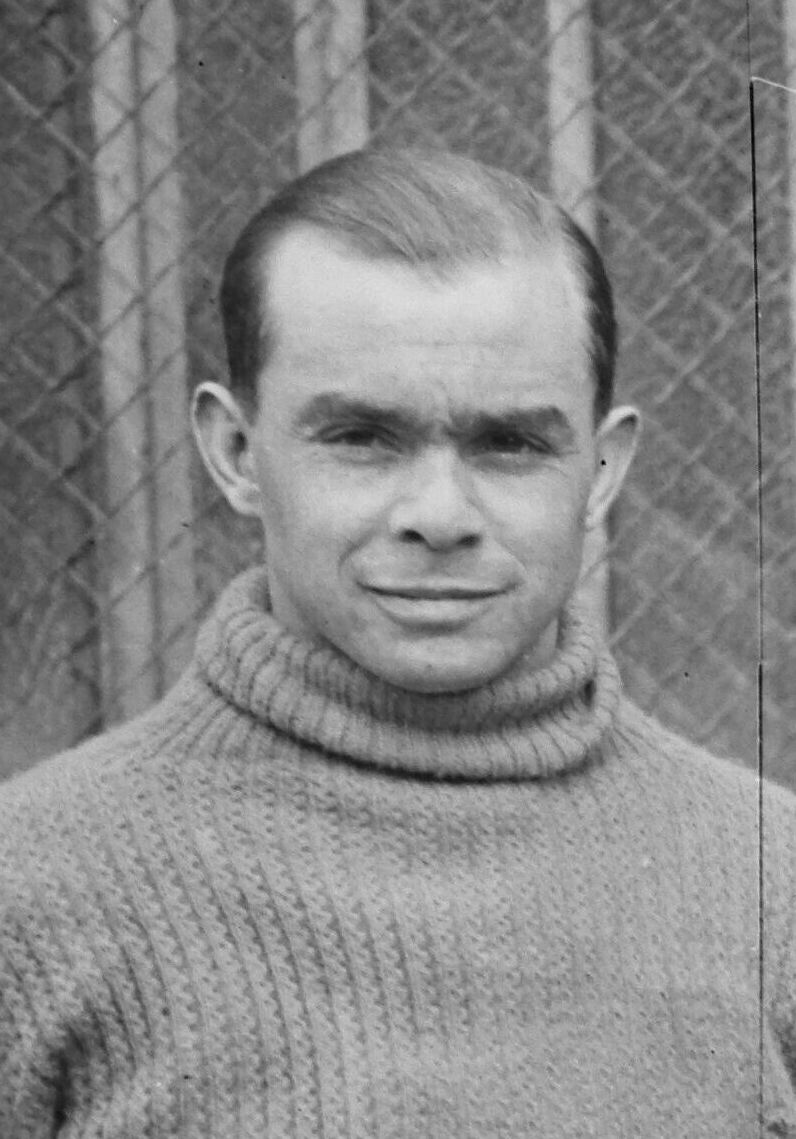
- André Tassin in 1930

Personal information
- Full name: André Tassin
- Date of birth: 23 February 1902
- Place of birth: Arras, Pas de Calais, France
- Date of death: 12 July 1986 (aged 84)
- Place of death: Reims, Champagne-Ardenne
- Height: 1.80 m (5 ft 11 in)
- Position: Goalkeeper

Senior career*
Years	Team	Apps	(Gls)
1929–1934	RC France	?	(?)
1934–1935	Amiens	?	(?)
1935–1936	Reims	?	(?)

International career
1930–1932	France	5	(0)
- * Club domestic league appearances and goals

André Tassin (23 February 1902 – 12 July 1986) was a French footballer. He played as goalkeeper for RC France.

A reserve for Alex Thépot at the 1930 FIFA World Cup, Tassin played for France in 1932.

== Playing career ==
- RC France (1929–1934)
- Amiens SC (1934–1935)
- Stade de Reims (1935–1936)

== Honours ==
- International in 1932 (5 caps)
- Finalist of the Coupe de France 1930 (with RC France)
