= Ivan Bek =

Serbian footballer (1909–1963)

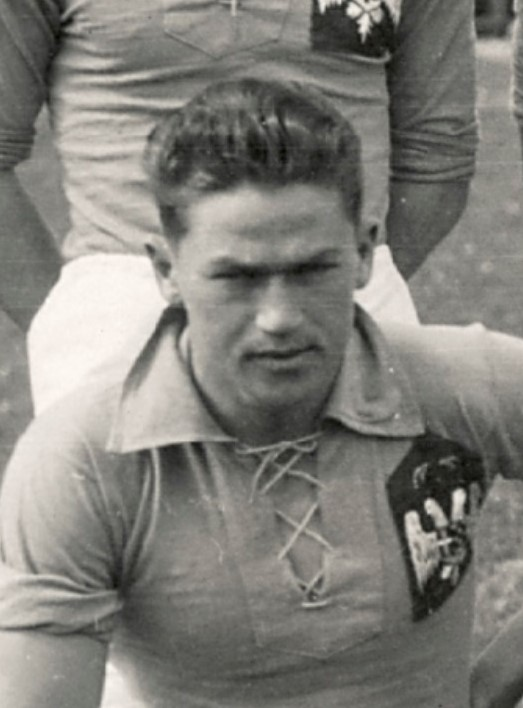
- Bek in 1928

Personal information
- Full name: Ivan Bek
- Date of birth: 29 October 1909
- Place of birth: Belgrade, Kingdom of Serbia
- Date of death: 2 June 1963 (aged 53)
- Place of death: Sète, France
- Height: 1.96 m (6 ft 5 in)
- Position: Forward

Senior career*
Years	Team	Apps	(Gls)
1925–1928	BSK	50	(51)
1928	Mačva Šabac		
1928–1931	Sète		
1931–1932	Urania Genève Sport	16	(16)
1932–1935	Sète	69	(33)
1935–1939	Saint-Étienne	109	(93)
1940–1943	Nîmes		
1943–1944	AS Aix		
Total		254	(193)

International career
1927–1931	Yugoslavia	8	(4)
1935–1937	France	5	(0)
- * Club domestic league appearances and goals

Ivan "Ivica" Bek (Serbian Cyrillic: Иван Ивица Бек; 29 October 1909 – 2 June 1963), also known as Yvan Beck, was a Serbian-French footballer who played as a forward.

He was part of Yugoslavia's team at the 1928 Summer Olympics and at the 1930 FIFA World Cup.

== Club career ==
Bek was born to a German father, and a Czech mother in the Serbian capital Belgrade borough of Čubura. Aged 16, he started playing in BSK where he scored 51 goals in 50 matches. In 1928, Bek moved to Mačva, and soon proceeded to French FC Sète. In his first season, he reached the cup finals, but lost 2–0 against Montpellier. Next year in cup finals against RC France, was victorious for Sète (3–1) with Bek scoring two decisive goals in extra time. Four years later with the same club, Bek was part of the first team that win the Double in France. Bek helped Yugoslavia get third place in the first FIFA world cup in Uruguay. Bek and his team went on a train from Belgrade to Marseille. When they came to Marseille they went on a crew ship to Uruguay in the second class.

== International career ==
Internationally, Bek represented the Kingdom of Yugoslavia (seven caps, four goals) and France (five caps). For Yugoslavia he debuted in 1927 against Bulgaria (2–0), participated Olympic tournament in 1928 in Amsterdam and played in the 1930 FIFA World Cup for Yugoslavia scoring three goals. In 1933, Bek took French citizenship and renamed himself Yvan Beck and in February 1935 he was picked for the first time for the Équipe Tricolore.

=== International goals ===
Scores and results list Yugoslavia's goal tally first, score column indicates score after each Bek goal.

List of international goals scored by Ivan Bek
No.	Date	Venue	Opponent	Score	Result	Competition
1	14 July 1930	Estadio Gran Parque Central, Montevideo, Uruguay	Brazil	2–0	2–1	1930 FIFA World Cup
2	17 July 1930	Estadio Gran Parque Central, Montevideo, Uruguay	Bolivia	1–0	4–0	1930 FIFA World Cup
3	17 July 1930	Estadio Gran Parque Central, Montevideo, Uruguay	Bolivia	3–0	4–0	1930 FIFA World Cup

== Post-playing career ==
During the Second World War, Bek was a member of the French Resistance. After the war, he worked as a dockworker in Sète, where he died from a heart attack.

== Honours ==
FC Sète

- Champion of France: 1934
- French Cup: 1930, 1934
