= Louis Cazal =

French footballer (1906–1945)

Personal information
- Full name: Louis-Pierre Cazal
- Date of birth: 24 October 1906
- Place of birth: Pennautier, France
- Date of death: 27 September 1945 (aged 38)
- Height: 1.78 m (5 ft 10 in)
- Position: Midfielder

Senior career*
Years	Team	Apps	(Gls)
1924–1930	Sète	–	(–)

International career
1927–1930	France	6	(0)

Managerial career
- 1939–1940: Sète
- * Club domestic league appearances and goals

Louis-Pierre "Pierrot" Cazal (24 October 1906 – 27 September 1945) was a French international footballer. Cazal spent most of his career with Sète winning the Coupe de France in 1930 with the club. With the France national team, Cazal played in six matches.
