= Edmond Kramer =

Swiss footballer (1906-1945)

Personal information
- Date of birth: 12 August 1906
- Place of birth: Colombier, Neuchâtel, Switzerland
- Date of death: April 1945
- Position: Attacking midfielder

Senior career*
Years	Team	Apps	(Gls)
1923–1924	Cantonal Neuchâtel		
1924–1925	Biel-Bienne		
1925–1927	GC Lunel		
1927–1930	SO Montpellier		
1930–1931	Urania Genève Sport		
1931–1932	Lausanne-Sport		
1932–1933	Servette		
1933–1934	Nice		
1934–1936	AS Villeurbanne		
1936–1937	AC Amiens		
1937–1938	Alès		

International career
	Switzerland	10	(1)
Medal record
Olympic medal record
Men's Football
Silver medal – second place	1924 Paris	Team competition
- * Club domestic league appearances and goals

Edmond Kramer (8 December 1906 – April 1945) was a Swiss footballer who competed in the 1924 Summer Olympics. He was a member of the Swiss team, which won the silver medal in the football tournament.
