= SC Sète =

Football club based in Sète, France

Sète
- Full name: Sporting Club Sétois
- Nickname: Les Dauphins (The Dolphins)
- Founded: 1914; 112 years ago 2023; 3 years ago (refounded)
- Ground: Stade Louis-Michel
- Capacity: 8,500
- President: Bastien Imbert-Crouzet
- Manager: Romain Canalès
- League: Régional 2 Occitanie

Sporting Club Sétois (French: Sporting Club sétois), commonly known as SC Sète or simply Sète, is a French football club based in Sète and founded in 1914. One of the founding members of the French Division 1 in 1932, the club currently competes in the Régional 2, the seventh tier of French football.

The club won the French Division 1 twice, in the 1933–34 and 1938–39 seasons, and the Coupe de France also twice, in the 1929–30 and 1933–34 seasons. Sète's 1933–34 campaign was the first time a French club won the league and national cup double. Until 1960, the club played a major role in French football, but due to financial issues, was forced to give up its professional status. From the 1970s until 2005, the club played in the amateur levels, before being promoted back to Ligue 2 in 2005 for one season. In 2023, following financial issues and judicial liquidation, the club was forced to give up its historical name Football Club de Sète 34 and was refounded as Sporting Club Sétois in the eighth-tier Régional 3.

Until 1990, Sète played its home matches at the Stade Georges-Bayrou, before adopting the Stade Louis-Michel as its new home that year.

== History ==
In 1901, Olympique de Cette was founded in the city of Sète. It ceased activities due to the war in 1914. The current club, FC de Cette, was subsequently founded. The club was champion of the Ligue du Sud-Est for seven consecutive years from the inception of the competition in 1920 until 1926. In 1928 the name of the town changed from Cette to Sète, and the football club was renamed FC Sète. The club reached consecutive Coupe de France finals in 1929 and 1930, losing 2–0 to SO Montpellier in the first before winning the trophy against Racing Club de France 3–1 after extra time.

In 1932 the club were founder members of the professional Division 1. They finished 4th in the group. The following season they won the Division 1 and Coupe de France double, becoming the first club to do so. They won their second Division 1 title in 1939, the last time the competition was played before World War II.

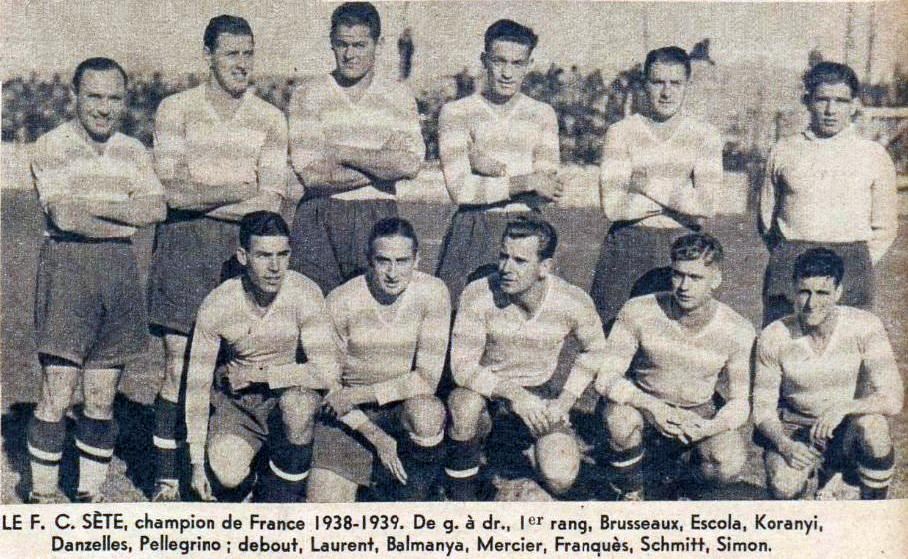
The club's team in the 1938–39 season, when they won their second Division 1 title

After the war, the club did not regain its previous heights, finishing no higher than 10th in Division 1, before relegation came in 1954. After six years in Division 2 the club relinquished its professional status and reformed as an amateur team at level two of the regional league (tier seven of the French league structure).

The club spent six years in the same regional division before securing three promotions in four years to return to national Division 2 for the 1970–71 season. A further six seasons followed before relegation to Division 3 in 1977. The club returned to Division 2 as champions of the south group of Division 3 in 1983 and spent six seasons at that level.

At the end of the 1988–89 season, FC Sète were administratively relegated for financial reasons after finishing 15th in group B. The club was officially renamed FC de Sète 34, restarted in Division 3, and moved to their current stadium Stade Louis Michel. They remained at the third level of French football until 1997 when a second administrative relegation dropped them to the fourth level, now named Championnat de France Amateur. After four seasons at this level, they won promotion back to Championnat National in 2001, as champions of group B. In 2005 a 3rd-place finish was enough for promotion to Ligue 2, but the club played just one season at this level before returning to the Championnat National at the end of the 2005–06 season.

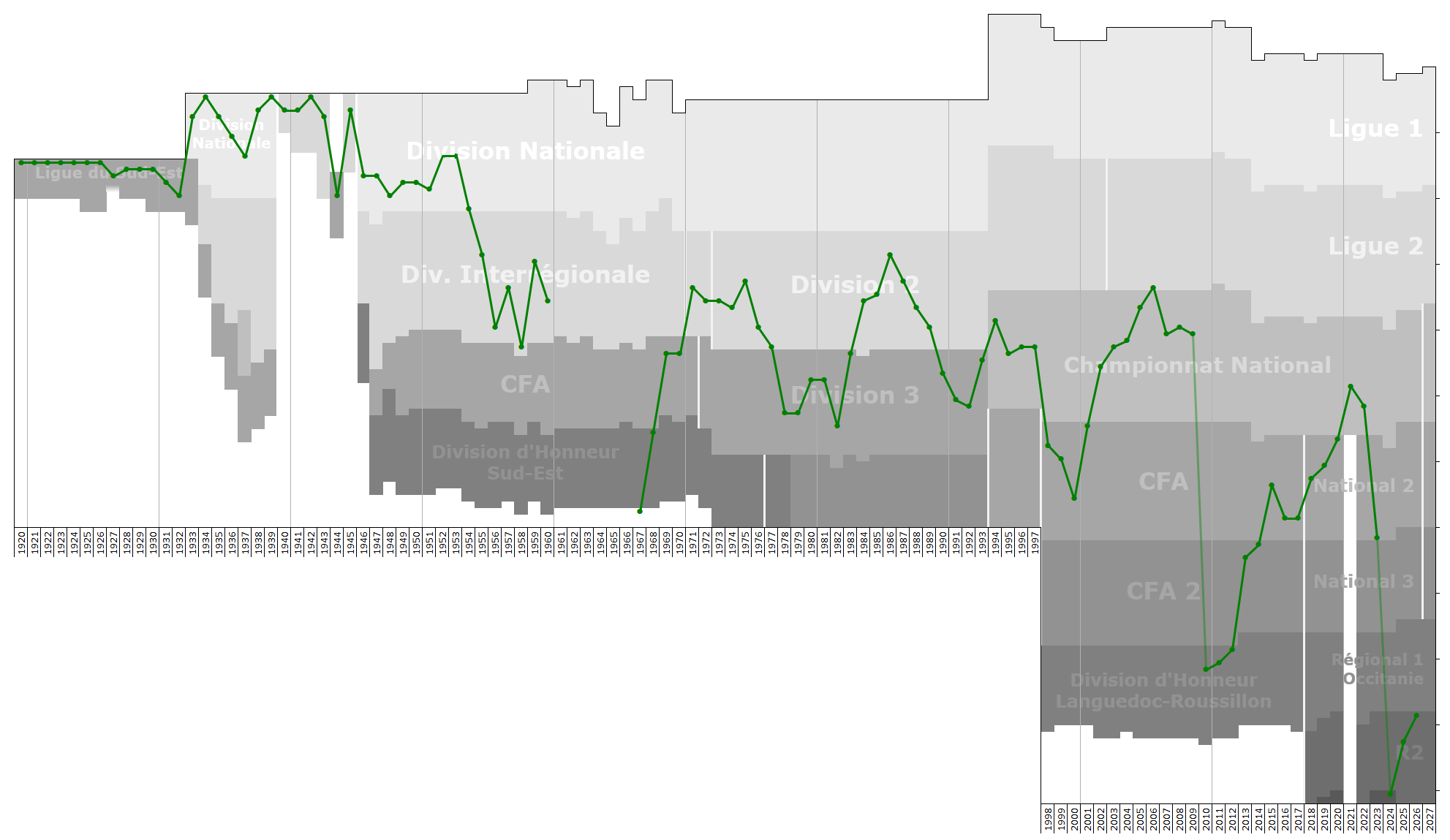
Historical league performance chart of FC Sète

A third administrative relegation, again for financial reasons, followed in 2009, and the club reformed for the 2009–10 season in the Division d'Honneur of the Languedoc-Roussillon regional league (tier 6). In 2012 they were promoted to Championnat de France Amateur 2 as champions of the Division d'Honneur and in 2014 they won promotion to Championnat de France Amateur, now called Championnat National 2. The club gained promotion to the Championnat National in the 2019–20 season, after being placed at the top of 2019–20 Championnat National 2 Group C when the season was terminated early due to the COVID-19 pandemic.

The club were relegated from the Championnat National by the Direction Nationale du Contrôle de Gestion at the end of the 2021–22 season, on the grounds of financial mismanagement.

The club hit financial troubles again during the 2022–23 season, being placed in receivership in April 2023 after a failed takeover, and estimated year-end debt of €700,000. Placed in judicial liquidation on 6 July 2023, the French Football Federation refused permission for the new organisation to continue the FC Sète name, and a new club Sporting Club Sétois was formed.

The club's logo from 1928 to 1933

=== Historical names ===
- Olympique de Cette: 1901–1914 (separate entity)
- Football Club de Cette: 1914–1928
- Football Club de Sète: 1928–1989
- Football Club de Sète 34: 1989–2023
- Sporting Club Sétois: 2023–present

== Managerial history ==
- Ivan Bek 1928–1931, 1932–1935
- Sydney Regan 1929–1933
- René Dedieu 1933–1936
- Joseph Azema 1936–1937
- Jean Marmiès 1937–1939
- Louis-Pierre Cazal 1939–1940
- Elie Rous 1940–1943
- Ljubiša Stefanović 1943–1946
- Gabriel Féron 1946–1947
- Pierre Danzelle 1947–1948
- Emile Féjean 1948–1949
- Elie Rous 1949–1950
- Marcel Tomazover 1950–1954
- István Závodi 1954–1955
- Désiré Koranyi 1955–1956
- Gaston Plovie 1956–1958
- Domènec Balmanya, 1958–60
- Marcel Tomazover 1960–1965
- René Mandaron and Gaston Plovie 1965–1969
- Jacky Bernard 1969–1970
- Dominique Marc and Gaston Plovie 1970–1972
- Xercès Louis 1972–1974
- Slobodan Milosavljević 1974–1976
- Jules Miramond 1976–1977
- Gyula Nagy and Marcel Tomazover 1977–1978
- Camille Passi 1978–1980
- Claude Calabuig 1980–1983
- Yves Herbet 1983–1985
- Slobodan Milosavljević 1985–1986
- Dominique Bathenay 1986–1988
- Claude Calabuig and Slobodan Milosavljević 1988–1989
- Claude Calabuig 1989–1990
- Otmar Pellegrini 1990–1991
- Claude Calabuig 1991–1996
- Marc Bourrier 1996–1997
- Claude Calabuig 1997–2000
- Patrick Lebeau et Laurent Scala 2000–2001
- Laurent Scala 2001–2002
- Albert Rust 2002–2003
- Gilles Beaumian et Claude Calabuig 2003–2005
- Ludovic Batelli January 2006 – March 2006
- Robert Buigues March 2006 – June 2006
- Christian Sarramagna 2006–2007
- Thierry Laurey 2007–2008
- Frédéric Rémola 2008–2009
- Gilles Beaumian 2009–2010
- Mathieu Chabbert et Christophe Rouve 2010–2011
- Laurent Scala 2011–2015
- Jean-Luc Muzet 2016–2018
- Nicolas Guibal 2018–2022
- Nicolas Le Bellec (2022–2023)
- Christopher Rouve (2023–2024)
- Adil El Hasnaoui (2024)
- Jun Fukuda (2024–2025)
- Romain Canalès (2025–present)

== Honours ==
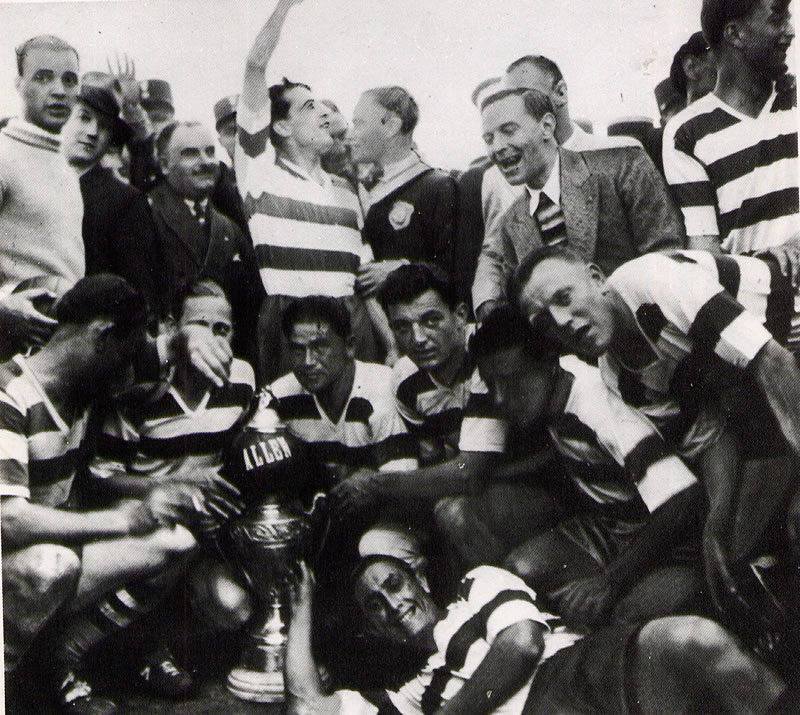
The 1933–34 Sète team celebrating their victory in the 1934 Coupe de France final

- French Division 1:
  - Winners (2): 1933–34, 1938–39
- Coupe de France:
  - Winners (2): 1930, 1934
  - Finalists (4): 1923, 1924, 1929, 1942
- Champion of Division d'Honneur Sud-Est : 1920, 1921, 1922, 1923, 1924, 1925, 1926, 1968
- Champion of Division d'Honneur Languedoc-Roussillon : 2012
- Champion CFA2 Group G: 2014
- Champion CFA Group B: 2001
- Champion Division 3 South Group: 1983
