= 1935–36 French Division 1 =

4th season of French Division 1

Division Nationale
- Season: 1935–36

RC Paris won Division 1 season 1935/1936 of the French Association Football League with 44 points.

== Participating teams ==
- Olympique Alès
- FC Antibes
- AS Cannes
- SC Fives
- Olympique Lillois
- Olympique de Marseille
- FC Metz
- FC Mulhouse
- RC Paris
- Red Star Olympique
- Stade Rennais UC
- Excelsior AC Roubaix
- FC Sète
- FC Sochaux-Montbéliard
- RC Strasbourg
- US Valenciennes-Anzin
Location of teams in 1935–36 Division 1

== Final table ==
Pos	Team	Pld	W	D	L	GF	GA	GAv	Pts	Qualification or relegation
1	Racing Paris (C)	30	20	4	6	81	45	1.800	44	
2	Lillois	30	17	7	6	62	32	1.938	41	
3	Strasbourg	30	18	3	9	67	37	1.811	39	
4	Sochaux	30	12	11	7	81	38	2.132	35	
5	Cannes	30	15	5	10	53	46	1.152	35	
6	Marseille	30	14	5	11	61	55	1.109	33	
7	Sète	30	14	4	12	49	48	1.021	32	
8	Fives	30	14	3	13	51	41	1.244	31	
9	Excelsior	30	13	5	12	65	56	1.161	31	
10	Rennes	30	10	8	12	44	62	0.710	28	
11	Metz	30	12	3	15	54	69	0.783	27	
12	Antibes	30	10	5	15	47	68	0.691	25	
13	Mulhouse	30	8	6	16	53	89	0.596	22	
14	Red Star	30	8	3	19	49	68	0.721	19	
15	Valenciennes (R)	30	7	5	18	57	87	0.655	19	Relegation to French Division 2
16	Alès (R)	30	5	9	16	39	72	0.542	19	Relegation to French Division 2

Rules for classification: Victory: 2 points, Draw: 1 point, Defeat: 0 points
(C) Champions; (R) Relegated

Promoted from Division 2, who will play in Division 1 season 1936/1937:

- FC Rouen: Champion of Division 2
- RC Roubaix: Runner-up Division 2

== Results ==
Home \ Away	ALÈ	FCA	AN	EAR	SCF	LIL	OM	MET	MUL	RCP	RSO	REN	SÈT	SOC	RCS	VAL
Alès		1–2	3–1	3–2	0–3	1–1	3–3	1–1	3–3	0–2	0–0	2–6	1–2	0–0	0–2	3–5
Antibes	3–2		0–1	1–0	3–1	3–1	3–2	0–0	3–2	3–9	2–0	3–1	1–4	1–3	1–1	3–1
Cannes	3–1	2–1		2–3	1–0	0–0	3–1	2–1	2–2	0–2	2–1	6–0	3–2	1–0	0–2	5–1
Excelsior Roubaix	1–1	2–0	2–0		4–3	1–2	1–1	2–3	4–0	0–2	6–4	1–1	2–0	2–2	2–1	3–1
Fives	1–2	1–1	5–1	1–0		1–1	1–2	3–0	3–0	2–0	2–1	1–3	3–0	2–1	0–1	3–2
Olympique Lillois	3–0	6–3	1–1	3–2	1–0		1–0	3–0	4–0	4–0	2–1	0–0	0–2	2–3	4–0	3–0
Marseille	2–0	4–1	3–0	2–5	3–2	1–0		3–0	6–2	2–5	1–4	7–1	1–0	4–1	1–0	1–0
Metz	1–1	2–1	2–1	3–5	0–2	1–2	5–2		2–1	1–2	5–1	2–0	3–1	3–2	5–1	5–4
Mulhouse	3–3	2–2	2–2	0–4	3–1	2–3	3–1	3–0		3–0	3–2	2–2	2–1	3–6	2–4	3–2
Racing Paris	3–1	3–2	5–0	3–2	4–0	2–3	2–2	3–5	3–1		4–1	4–0	2–1	1–1	4–1	2–1
Red Star Olympique	1–2	4–1	0–3	3–2	1–4	0–2	0–2	6–2	7–1	1–4		0–1	1–1	2–2	1–2	2–0
Rennes	2–0	2–1	1–3	2–2	2–3	1–1	1–1	2–0	5–1	0–3	3–0		1–0	1–1	2–0	1–1
Sète	1–0	4–0	2–0	1–3	1–0	2–1	1–0	2–1	3–1	1–1	3–2	4–2		1–4	3–1	1–1
Sochaux	7–0	5–1	1–1	6–2	0–0	1–1	4–0	6–0	0–1	2–2	0–1	2–0	2–2		1–1	12–1
Strasbourg	6–1	2–1	0–2	1–0	2–1	3–2	4–1	4–0	3–0	0–1	6–0	8–0	4–0	2–1		4–0
Valenciennes	2–4	0–0	2–5	4–0	1–2	1–5	2–2	3–1	8–2	5–3	0–2	3–1	5–3	0–5	1–1	

Legend: Blue = home team win; Yellow = draw; Red = away team win.

== Top goalscorers ==
Rank	Player	Club	Goals
1	(France) (Switzerland) Roger Courtois	Sochaux	34
2	(Germany) Oskar Rohr	Strasbourg	28
3	(France) Antoine Franceschetti	Cannes	23
3	(France) René Couard	Racing Paris	23
5	(England) Frederick Kennedy	Racing Paris	19
6	(France) Jean Lauer	Fives	18
7	(France) Jean Sécember	Excelsior Roubaix	17
8	(Switzerland) André Abegglen	Sochaux	16
9	(France) (Austria) Henri Hiltl	Excelsior Roubaix	15
9	(France) Mario Zatelli	Marseille	15

== Players used ==
Club	Players used in D1 in 1935–36 (matches played, goals scored)
Olympique Alésien	Aoued (29), Bandon (3), Becic (11), Begio (1), Bernardi (23), Bousquet (2), Cabannes (24), Cellar (16), Dautheribes (13), Eybalin (7), Gebellin (23), Herceg (7), Janin (5), Langeard (6), Laurent (24), Mary (5), Mazelle (2), Lioch (8), Nègre (2), Padrón (21), Petit (28), Pybert (21), Rodriguez (17), Smoker (7), Somlaï (25). (1 own goal by Cernicki from Fives et one by Heil de Valenciennes).
FC Antibes	Amand (30), Auvergne (12, 1), Bonnel (1), Cavalera (2), Chaniel (2), Dupuis (8, 3), Ehms (27), Fecchino (30, 1), Guidicelli (10, 1), Grunbaum (10), Hudecek (20, 9), Kauffmann (11), Kern (25, 9), Martin (6), Marzelli (2), Masset (30), Meliga (26, 1), Mosselli (23, 6), Planques (25, 12), Semeria (29, 2) et Stuerga (1). (1 own goal by Conchy from Marseille)
AS Cannes	Babineck (14, 4), Bardot (12, 1), Begnis (1), Borges (1), Calecca (1), Cauvin (2), Cler (27, 1), Cornilli (22), Finn (18), Franceschetti (29, 23), Guimbard (25, 8), Kekeiss (14), Kovacs (20, 5), Miquel (18, 2), Mori (18), Pasquini (19, 4), Pawlack (17), Schwartz (28), Tourniaire (13), Trenna (1) et Vandini (30). (1 own goal by Bernardi et 1 penalty goal by the board)
SC Fives	Bara (1, 1), Berry (1), Bourbotte (29), Chalvidan (27, 7), Cernicky (23), Cheuva (26, 7), Conotte (5), Czubach (12, 4), Dalheimer (27), Dhoat (1), Deloose (1), Delourme (5), Gonzalès (30), Jankowski (1), Juszezyck (1), Jean Lauer (27, 18), Jos Lauer (11), Leleu (19), Méresse (30), Saint-Pé (13, 6), Sefelin (28), Synaghel (2), Van de Putte (2) et Wasilcwski (8, 2). Manager : George Berry. (1 own goal by Hummel from Strasbourg)
Olympique Lillois	Bariseau (7, 1), Beaucourt (30, 1), Bigot (22, 14), Cahours (21), Cantegrit (1), Cléau (29), Decottignies (23, 10), Défossé (30), Delannoy (20, 7), Grauby (17), Higgins (30, 12), Laurent (1), Leblanc (1), Lukacs (12, 3), Muller (10, 4), Vandooren (29), Volante (24, 1) et Windner (23, 7). Coach : Ted Magner. (1 own goal by Bourbotte from Fives et 1 by Desrousseaux from Excelsior)
Olympique de Marseille	Alcazar (26, 11), Bastien (29, 2), Bistolfi (2), Bruhin (17), Cavalli (11), Conchy (20), Crut (1), Curcuru (11), Di Lorto (26), Durand (15, 1), Eisenhoffer (3, 1), Erévanian (2), Gorelli (3), Janin (23, 4), Kohut (29, 9), Kurka (25), Mester (16, 3), Pascal (4), Rabih (3), Roviglione (18, 4), Zatelli (19, 15) et Zermani (27, 7). Entraîneur-joueur : Eisenhoffer. (1 own goal by Petit from Alès)
CS Metz	Altuna (8, 2), Archen (7), Buhrer (4, 1), Fosset (25, 1), Gara (6), Gottwald (20, 8), Hanke (27, 7), Hauswirth (23), Hibst (26), Kappé (29), Lorrain (1), Manville (1), Marchal (24, 1), Muller (4, 1), Nuic (12, 1), Roger (19, 9), Rohrbacher (28, 10), Schobert (2, 2), Thomas (2), Van Caeneghem (18, 10), Watrin (14), Weigarten (2, 1) et Zehren (28). Manager : Peter Fabian.
FC Mulhouse	Badina (13), Bilger I (16, 1), Bilger II (1), Brehm (7, 1), Casy (30), Flegel (15, 10), Gasco (5), Gruenfeld (19, 7), Harthong (21, 1), Heinrich (18, 1), Hornus (13), Kauffmann (27, 8), Korb (27, 2), Kumhoffer (23), Loewinger (8), Naegelen (7, 3), Reiminger (3, 1), Springnisfield (1, 1), Unser (26), Vovard (17), Weselik (25, 14) et Zolg (8). Entraîneur : Fritz Kerr. (1 own goal by Andoire from Red Star, 1 by Lalloué from Sochaux et 1 by Franquès from Sète)
RC Paris	Banide (26), Branca (4), Bohé (4, 1), Raymond Couard (1), Roger Couard (22, 23), Delfour (30, 4), Diagne (28), Dupuis (11), Fournis (1), Galey (3), Gauteroux (8), Hiden (8), Jordan (30, 3), Kennedy (29, 19), Mathé (12, 7), Mercier (18, 8), Ozenne (11, 8), Roux (22), Schmidt (18), Veinante (27, 4), Živković (7, 5). Manager : George Kimpton. (1 own goal by Daumin from Red Star)
Red Star Olympique	Acht (14), Andoire (25), Andrieux (2), Aston (30, 5), Burlotte (19), Chantrel (24), Conchy (23, 1), Daumin (18, 1), Delmer (23), Dominique (12), Gonzalès (16), Laporte (12, 1), Lorentz (12), Morel (9), Moulet (5), O'Neill (21, 11), Penot (1), Pinel (3), Pohan (9), Sas (21, 12), Schweitzer (4), Ségaux (13, 8) et Stábile (14, 10). Player-coach : Guillermo Stábile.
Stade Rennais UC	Bambridge (27), Barlemann (23, 3), Belliard (1), Boccon (18, 2), Braun (28), Castro (19, 5), Chauvel (27, 5), Collet (2), Delourme (6), Fitoussi (2), Gardet (14), J. Laurent (26, 1), Le Guerrier (8, 2), Le Moal (4), Lopez (16, 3), Mayboek (13, 9), Pleyer (30), Rose (26, 1), Rouxel (9, 1), Schneider (5), Villacampa (18) et Wollweiler (13, 8). Player-coach : Josef Schneider. (1 own goal by Hummel from Strasbourg, 1 by Gonzalès from Fives, 1 by Llense from Sète et 1 by O'Neil from Red Star)
Excelsior AC Roubaix	Ackermann (2), Barbieux (4), Brouwers (23), Camporciero (1), Sécember (21, 17), Desrousseaux (28), Dhulst (30), Frutuoso (25, 6), Martin (28, 10), Gonzalès (28), Hiltl (29, 15), Jaeger (1), Kalmar (16, 3), Liétaer (30), McCabe (1), Ortin (20), Renwick (3, 2), Rodriguez I (30, 9), Rodriguez II (2, 2), Schweiger (3), Vermeuren (3, 1) et Vincent (2).
FC Sète	Acimovic (28), Ben Bouali (28), Benouma (30, 4), Bouzat (5), Charles (1), Chincholle (4), Clarenc (6, 2), Cros (14, 1), Franques (29), Gabrillargues (26, 5), Gérard (28, 8), Hillier (27), Iriondo (14, 14), Koranyi (17, 7), Llense (25), Médan (15), Monsallier (29, 6) et Weiskopf (4, 3). (1 own goal by Ehms from Antibes)
FC Sochaux	Abegglen (19), Belko (10), Cazals (1), Courtois (28), Duhart (17), Finot (16), Gougain (20), Hug (10), Jacquin (6), Lalloué (30), L. Laurent (7), Lehmann (26), Leslie (18), Libérati (6), Mattler (29), Maschinot (7), Pretto (3), Rafaat (4), Sarrieux (4), Simonyi (15), Szabo (25), Wagner (27) et Williams (2). Manager : Conrad Ross then André Abegglen, as player-coach. (1 own by Brouwers from Excelsior, 1 by Petit from Alès, 1 by Cornilli from Cannes, 1 by Ortin from Excelsior)
RC Strasbourg	Bauer (25), Cay (7, 2), Chloupeck (12, 5), Fettig (2), Guerhard (1), Halter (28), Heisserer (28, 13), Hoffmann (15, 2), Hummel (28), C. Keller (28, 8), F. Keller (17, 5), Papas (30), Rieth (1), Rohr (28, 28), Schaden (28, 1), Scharwath (30), Streicher (6), Veillard (2), Walk (13, 2) et Zeh (1). Manager : Josef Blum. (1 own goal by Szabo from Sochaux)
US Valenciennes-Anzin	Buirette (12), Chardar (27), Ducatellon (12), Gibson (9, 4), Heil (17), Ignace (28, 11), Kovacs (10), Meuris (27), Motschmann (26, 10), O'Dowd (10), Parmentier (18), Peiffert (7), Pinteau (25, 14), Plummer (18, 6), Russel (1), Thiery (20), C. Tison (19), S. Tison (1), Waggi (29, 10) et Whitehouse (14, 1). Manager : Fabian. (1 own goal by Défossé from Lille)
