= 1939 Coupe de France final =

- Event: 1938–39 Coupe de France
RC Paris	Olympique Lillois
3	1
- Date: 14 May 1939
- Venue: Olympique Yves-du-Manoir, Colombes
- Referee: Paul Marenco
- Attendance: 52,431

The 1939 Coupe de France final was a football match held at Stade Olympique Yves-du-Manoir, Colombes on May 14, 1939, that saw RC Paris defeat Olympique Lillois 3–1 thanks to goals by José Pérez, Emile Veinante and Jules Mathé.

== Match details ==
14 May 1939

RC Paris	3–1	Olympique Lillois
Pérez 4'; Veinante 25'; Mathé 40'		Kalocsai 19'

Stade Olympique Yves-du-Manoir, Colombes
Attendance: 52,431
Referee: Paul Marenco

GK	(France) (Nazi Germany) Rodolphe Hiden
DF	(France) Maurice Dupuis
DF	(France) Raoul Diagne
DF	(Spain) Ramon De Zabalo
DF	(France) (Nazi Germany) Auguste Jordan
MF	(France) Wojkowiak Louys
MF	(Argentina) José Pérez
FW	(France) Oscar Heisserer
FW	(France) Henri Ozenne
FW	(France) Emile Veinante (c)
FW	(France) Jules Mathé
Manager:
(England) George Kimpton Assistant Referees: Fourth Official:

GK	(France) Julien Darui
DF	(France) Jules Vandooren (c)
DF	(France) Laurent Walczak
DF	(France) Jules Carly
DF	(Hungary) Janos Moré
MF	(France) Jean Cléau
MF	(France) Jules Bigot
FW	(France) André Cheuva
FW	(France) Jacques Delannoy
FW	(France) Jean-Marie Prévost
FW	(Hungary) Géza Kalocsay
Manager:
Eugène Conrad

== See also ==
- 1938–39 Coupe de France
