= 1936 Coupe de France final =

- Event: 1935–36 Coupe de France
RC Paris	FCO Charleville
1	0
- Date: 3 May 1936
- Venue: Olympique Yves-du-Manoir, Colombes
- Referee: Georges Capdeville
- Attendance: 39,725

The 1936 Coupe de France final was a football match held at Stade Olympique Yves-du-Manoir, Colombes on 3 May 1936, that saw RC Paris defeat FCO Charleville 1–0 thanks to a goal by Roger Couard.

== Match details ==
3 May 1936

RC Paris	1–0	FCO Charleville
Couard 67'

Stade Olympique Yves-du-Manoir, Colombes
Attendance: 39,725
Referee: Georges Capdeville

GK	(France) (Austria) Rodolphe Hiden
DF	(France) Maurice Dupuis
DF	(France) Raoul Diagne
DF	(France) Maurice Banide
DF	(France) (Austria) Auguste Jordan
MF	(France) Edmond Delfour (c)
MF	(France) Henri Ozenne
FW	(England) Frederick Kennedy
FW	(France) Roger Couard
FW	(France) Emile Veinante
FW	(France) Jules Mathé
Manager:
(England) George Kimpton Assistant Referees: Fourth Official:

GK	(France) Julien Darui
DF	(France) Alphonse Languillat
DF	(France) (Argentina) Helenio Herrera (c)
DF	(France) Pierre Brembilla
DF	(Austria) Karl Mrkvicka
MF	(France) Armand Frelin
MF	(France) Charles Woerth
FW	(France) Augustin Dujardin
FW	(France) Marcel Dufrasne
FW	(Austria) Erich Bieber
FW	(France) Georges Merveille
Manager:
(Austria) Erich Bieber

== See also ==
- 1935–36 Coupe de France
