= 1942 Coupe de France final =

- Event: 1941–42 Coupe de France
Red Star	Sète
2	0
- Date: 17 May 1942
- Venue: Olympique Yves-du-Manoir, Colombes
- Referee: Georges Capdeville
- Attendance: 44,654

The 1942 Coupe de France final was a football match held at Stade Olympique Yves-du-Manoir, Colombes on May 17, 1942, that saw Red Star Olympique defeat FC Sète 2–0 thanks to goals by Henri Joncourt at 45 minutes, and Alfred Aston at 72 minutes.

== Match details ==
17 May 1942

Red Star	2–0	Sète
Vandevelde 45'; Aston 72'

Stade Olympique Yves-du-Manoir, Colombes
Attendance: 44,654
Referee: Georges Capdeville

GK	(France) Julien Darui
DF	(France) (Argentina) Helenio Herrera
DF	(France) Henri Roessler
MF	(France) Georges Meuris (c)
DF	(France) Gabriel Braun
DF	(France) René Sergent
FW	(France) Alfred Aston
FW	(France) (Hungary) André Simonyi
MW	(France) Paul Bersoullé
FW	(France) Henri Joncourt
FW	(France) Roger Vandevelde
Manager:
(France) Émile Veinante Assistant Referees: Fourth Official:

GK	(France) Arménak Erévanian
DF	(France) Jean Mathieu
DF	(France) René Franques (c)
DF	(France) Jules Robisco
DF	(France) Lucien Leduc
MF	(France) Charles Laurent
MF	(France) Mohammed Laid
FW	(France) Edmond Novicki
FW	(France) (Hungary) Désiré Koranyi
FW	(France) Pierre Danzelle
FW	(France) Jean Miramon
Manager:
(England) Elly Rous

== See also ==
- 1941–42 Coupe de France
