= 1940 Coupe de France final =

- Event: 1939–40 Coupe de France
RC Paris	Marseille
2	1
- Date: 5 May 1940
- Venue: Parc des Princes, Paris
- Referee: Charles de la Salle
- Attendance: 25,969

The 1939–40 Coupe de France football competition concluded with a final at the Parc des Princes stadium in Paris on 5 May 1940 between RC Paris, the winners of the previous competition, and Olympique de Marseille, winners of the 1937–1938 competition. The closing stages of the competition were held against a backdrop of war with Germany, with the invasion of France imminent by the day of the final.

Paris had used 20 different players during their progression to the final, highlighting the difficulty in forming a consistent team during war-time. Only the team's captain, 20-year-old René Roulier played in every cup tie.

Both teams contained a number of naturalised players in their squads, Paris with five: goalkeeper Hiden, midfielder Jordan and centre forward Hiltl of Austria; and wingers Mathé and Weiskopf from Hungary. For their part, Marseille included a "stateless" Austrian in the form of their winger, Donenfeld (Austria having annexed by Germany in the Anschluss of 1938), together with a naturalised former German, centre forward Heiss, and a Hungarian, centre forward Eisenhoffer, a 40-year-old veteran.

The game itself was an aggressive affair, with a player on each side dismissed from the field of play. Having taken the lead in the 16th minute through Emmanuel Aznar, Marseille conceded two goals, in the 25th minute to Paris captain Roulier, and on 70 minutes, to Mathé; Marseille claimed that both Paris goals were offside.

== Match details ==
5 May 1940

RC Paris	2–1	Marseille
Roulier 25'; Mathé 70'		Aznar 16'

Parc des Princes, Paris
Attendance: 25,969
Referee: Charles de la Salle

GK	(France) (Nazi Germany) Rudi Hiden
DF	(France) Maurice Dupuis
DF	(France) Raoul Diagne
DF	(Spain) Ramón Zabalo
DF	(France) (Nazi Germany) Auguste Jordan
MF	(France) Christian Rouellé
MF	(France) Jules Mathé
FW	(France) (Nazi Germany) Henri Hiltl
FW	(France) René Roulier (c)
FW	(France) Oscar Heisserer
FW	(Hungary) Edmond Weiskopf
Manager:
(France) Elie Rous Assistant referees: Fourth official:

GK	(France) Jacques Delachet
DF	(France) Joseph Gonzales (c)
DF	(France) Camille Malvy
DF	(France) Jean Bastien
DF	(France) Max Conchy
MF	(France) Raymond Durand
MF	(France) Georges Dard
FW	(France) (Nazi Germany) Wilhelm Heiss
FW	(France) Emmanuel Aznar
FW	(Hungary) József Eisenhoffer
FW	(Nazi Germany) Friedrich Donenfeld
Manager:
(Hungary) József Eisenhoffer

== See also ==
- 1939–40 Coupe de France
