= Jacques Delannoy =

French footballer (1912–1958)

Personal information
- Date of birth: 5 August 1912
- Place of birth: Douai, Nord, France
- Date of death: 20 September 1958 (aged 46)
- Place of death: France
- Height: 1.78 m (5 ft 10 in)
- Position: Forward

Senior career*
Years	Team	Apps	(Gls)
1930–1936	Olympique Lillois		
1936–1937	Red Star		
1937–1939	Olympique Lillois		

International career
1937	France	1	(0)
- * Club domestic league appearances and goals

Jacques Delannoy (5 August 1912 – 20 September 1958) was a French footballer who played as a midfielder for Olympique Lillois and the French national team in the 1930s.

== Playing career ==
=== Club career ===
Born on 5 August 1912 in Douai, Nord, Delannoy began his football career at Olympique Lillois in 1931, aged 19, where he remained for five seasons, until 1936. On 30 August 1930, he played for a mixed team from OL that was mostly composed of juniors in a pre-season friendly match against CA Vitry. In his first full season at the club, he played in the inaugural edition of the Coupe Sochaux, helping his side reach the final, held at Parc des Princes on 17 May 1931, where he missed several "excellent opportunities" in an eventual 6–1 loss to Sochaux.

Delannoy played on the right wing, standing out as "a good dribbler with fiery runs", which was not enough to earn him huge popularity with the public, which considered him "impressionable". Together with Robert Défossé, Georges Beaucourt, and Georges Winckelmans, he was a member of the OL team that won the inaugural edition of the French professional championship in 1932–33.

In 1936, Delannoy joined Red Star, with whom he played for just a single season, as he then returned to OL in 1937, where he stayed for two more years, until 1939, when he retired at the age of 27. Together with Jules Vandooren, Jules Bigot, and André Cheuva, he played a crucial role in helping the OL team reach the 1939 Coupe de France final, which ended in a 3–1 loss to final. In total, he scored 26 goals in 103 official Ligue 1 matches for OL and Red Star.

=== International career ===
On 5 June 1932, the 19-year-old Delannoy earned his first (and only) international cap in a friendly match against Yugoslavia in Belgrade, which ended in a 2–1 loss. A few days later, the local press stated that Delannoy was the weakest attacking player of France, describing him as "intimidated and slow to find the rhythm".

== Death ==
Delannoy died on 20 September 1958, at the age of 46. (Note: Some sources wrongly claim that he died on 30 November 1957.)

== Honours ==
Olympique Lillois

- Ligue 1:
  - Champions (1): 1932–33
  - Runner-up (1): 1935–36
- Coupe de France:
  - Runner-up (1): 1938–39
- Coupe Sochaux:
  - Runner-up (1): 1931
