= Maurice Banide =

French footballer (1905–1995)

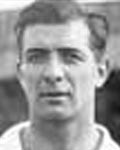

Personal information
- Date of birth: 20 May 1905
- Place of birth: Montpellier, France
- Date of death: 20 May 1995 (aged 90)
- Place of death: Montmorency, France
- Position: Midfielder

Senior career*
Years	Team	Apps	(Gls)
1929–1930	Strasbourg		
1930–1933	Mulhouse		
1933–1934	Club Français		
1934–1940	Racing Club Paris	84	(0)

International career
1929–1936	France	9	(1)

Managerial career
- 1948–1950: Niort
- * Club domestic league appearances and goals

Maurice Banide (20 May 1905 – 20 May 1995) was a professional French football player and manager. He played as a midfielder and was part of the Racing Club Paris side that won the Division 1 and Coupe de France double in 1936, as well as winning the Coupe de France in 1939 and 1940. He was also part of France's squad for the 1928 Summer Olympics, but he did not play in any matches.

Between 1929 and 1936, Banide was awarded nine caps for the France national team, scoring one goal. After retiring from playing, he managed Chamois Niortais for two seasons, guiding the team to promotion to Division 3 in 1949.
