= Edmond Weiskopf =

French footballer (1911–1996)

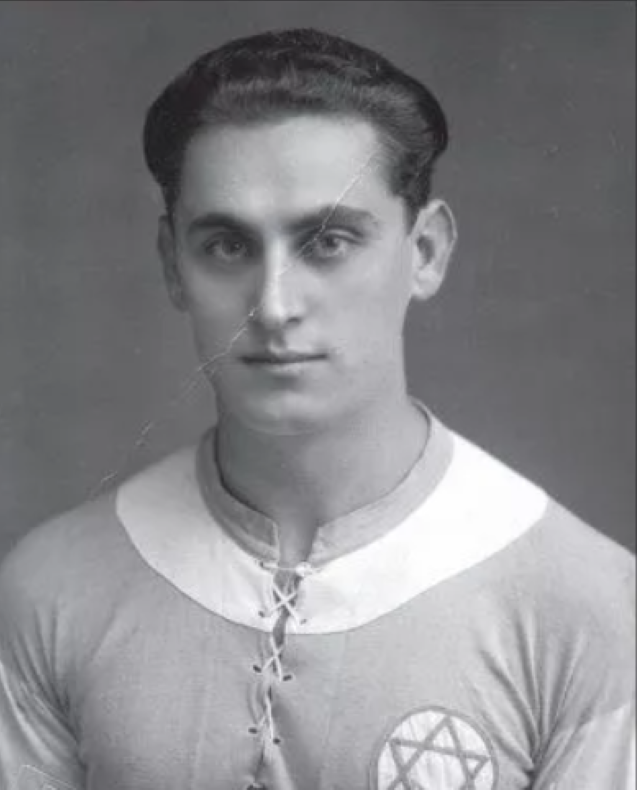
- Weiskopf with the Hakoah Vienna jersey in the early 1930s

Personal information
- Birth name: Odon Virag
- Date of birth: 22 October 1911
- Place of birth: Budapest, Hungary
- Date of death: 16 March 1996 (aged 84)
- Height: 1.76 m (5 ft 9 in)
- Position: Forward

Senior career*
Years	Team	Apps	(Gls)
1927–1931	MTK Budapest		
1931–1934	Hakoah Vienna	43	(20)
1934–1936	Sète	15	(6)
1936–1938	Olympique de Marseille	25	(18)
1938–1939	Metz	29	(10)
1939–1940	Racing Club de France		
1940–1942	Olympique de Marseille	24	(6)
1942–1944	Annecy		
1944–1946	Red Star		
1946–1948	Stade Français		
1948–1950	Maccabi Paris		

International career
1939	France	1	(0)

Managerial career
- 1949: Maccabi Paris
- * Club domestic league appearances and goals

Edmond Weiskopf (22 October 1911 – 16 March 1996), later known as Edmond Virage, was a Hungarian-born French footballer who played as a forward for Metz, Olympique de Marseille, and the French national team in the 1930s.

== Early life ==
Odon Virag was born in Budapest on 22 October 1911, into a modest Jewish family, and as such, he joined the ranks of MTK Budapest in 1927, which had strong ties with the Jewish community of the Hungarian capital, and also took the Jewish-sounding name Weiskopf in the late 1920s.

== Club career ==
=== Early career ===
At MTK, Weiskopf achieved excellent times in the 100 and 200 metres and was also a good shot putter, but in the end, he decided to opt for a career as a professional footballer. In 1930, he was a member of a team of Hungarian juniors who toured Turkey, helping his side defeat the Turkish seniors in Istanbul. Having stood out from the rest of his teammates, his compatriot József Eisenhoffer decided to bring him to Hakoah Vienna, with whom he played there for three years, from 1931 until 1934, scoring 20 goals in 43 league matches. He scored his earliest known goal as a Hakoah professional in December 1931 in an international Christmas tournament against Nemzeti Budapest, and his first goal in a competitive match on 14 February 1932 in a Cup round of 16 match against Pflichtspiel.

In 1934, Weiskopf moved to France, not only because he was worried by the political situation in Vienna and of the French clubs' higher salaries, but also because some of his compatriots had already done the same, with Eisenhoffer being in Marseille since 1932, and Marton Bukovi in Sète since 1933. Furthermore, he had already attracted attention in France in April 1933 when he scored a goal with Hakoah in a tournament in Marseille, to help his side to a 6–2 win against FC Sochaux.

=== Sète ===
Weiskopf decided to join up with Bukovi at Sète, which at the time was strongest team in the country since it had just won both the league and Coupe de France. In 1939, Eisenhoffer, now the coach of Lens, described him as "a fine athlete who uses both feet with ease since he can play as either right or left winger, being extremely fast". However, he was unable to impose himself at Sète, neither as a right or left winger, nor even in the interior position where he was tried. For instance, on the day after a 6–3 win over OM, he was heavily criticized by the journalists of the French newspaper L'intransigeant, stating that "Weisskopf led the Sète attack line in such a way as to satisfy his opponents more than his partners, as none of the six Sète goals were his work".

=== Olympique de Marseille ===
In 1936, after two mixed seasons in Sète, Weiskopf joined OM, then coached by Eisenhoffer and Friedrich Donenfeld, with whom he had played at Hakoah in Vienna, and together, they played a crucial role in helping OM win the 1936–37 French Division 1 and the 1937–38 Coupe de France, although he did not play in the final. Despite some improvement, he was still far from his best level, so in 1938, he was sold to Metz, where he finally reached his full potential, being even called-up for two matches with France in early 1939, but his career was then halted by the outbreak of World War II.

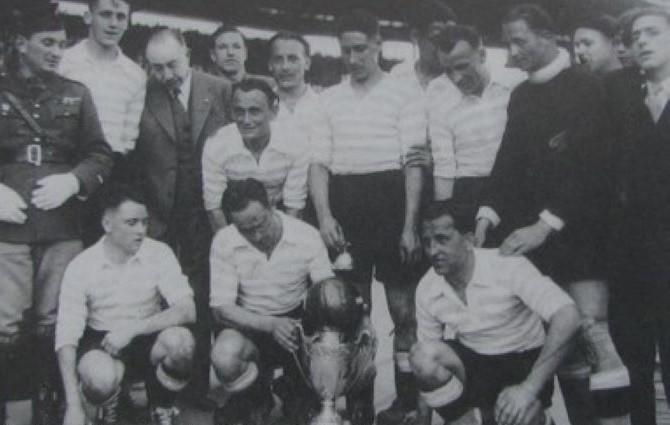
Weiskopf with the RC France team that won the Coupe de France in 1940.

A French citizen, Weiskopf was mobilized in September 1939, but luckily, he was placed in garrison near Paris, which allowed him to keep playing football, now with Racing Club de France. In his first (and only) season at the club, he helped Racing win the 1939–40 Coupe de France, starting in the final at the Parc des Princes on 5 May, which ended in a 2–1 over his former club OM. In the final, he was sent off after having a heated duel with Marseille's centre-half Max Conchy, who had kicked him in the face while lying on the ground. Five days later, the German armies began their offensive in the West, and following a short stint as a prisoner, he was released and managed to reach the unoccupied zone. In late 1940, he returned to OM, where he once again partnered with Eisenhoffer and Donnenfeld, and in order to escape anti-Semitic persecution, he once again changed his name, this time to Edmond Virage.

=== Later career ===
In 1942, Virage left Marseille to join up with his friend Raoul Diagne in Annecy, where they not only played for the professional team FC Annecy, but also ran a bar called Le Coup Franc. When professionalism was finally abolished in June 1943, the two friends refused to participate in the 1943–44 French Federal Football Championship, thus playing that season as amateurs in Annecy. In September 1943, Annecy was occupied by the Germans, who, aided by the French Militia, came knocking at his door, so he had to flee, doing so with his wife Catherine and his 4-year-old son Ronald, but rather than going to the nearby Switzerland, they instead went the Paris region since he had friends there.

Shortly after the Liberation of France in August 1944, Virage joined the ranks of Red Star, where he once again coincided with Donnenfeld, along with André Simonyi, who was also a French international of Hungarian origin. He is among the few footballers who have played for both OM and Red Star. After two seasons at Red Star, from 1944 until 1946, he joined Maccabi Paris, with whom he took part in the Maccabi Games in Vienna in July 1946, where they were knocked out by his former club Hakoah.

Virage then went to Stade Français, where he played one more season before retiring in 1947, aged 36. In total, he scored 32 goals in 69 league matches. In 1949, he renewed his professional license and worked as a coach for Maccabi Paris. Some sources also stated that he played a further two seasons at Annecy between 1948 and 1950.

== International career ==
In 1930, Weiskopf played an unspecified number of international C matches (juniors) for the young Hungarian Football Association.

Whilst in Merseille, Weiskopf failed to be selected to the Hungary national team for the 1938 FIFA World Cup, having been blocked by Willy Kohut. Having been naturalized as French in March 1938, Weiskopf was called-up to play two friendlies for France in early 1939, first against Poland on 22 January, in which he did not play, and then against the World Cup runner-ups Hungary at the Parc des Princes on 16 March, thus earning his first (and only) international cap against his homeland. Overwhelmed by the Parc des Princes crowd, however, Weiskopf missed two good chances in the first half, including "a ready-made, ready-made, ready-prepared goal". Two days later, on 18 March, Maurice Pefferkorn wrote in the French newspaper L'Auto (the future L'Équipe) that his selection was a bad idea due to his origins, stating that "it is quite possible that he felt some instinctive discomfort playing against his former compatriots".

== Death ==
After retiring from football, Weiskopf ventured into the textile business. He died on 16 March 1996, at the age of 85.

== Honours ==
Marseille

- Ligue 1: 1936–37; runner-up 1937–38
- Coupe de France: 1938

RC de France

- Coupe de France: 1940
