= Edmond Delfour =

French footballer and manager (1907–1990)

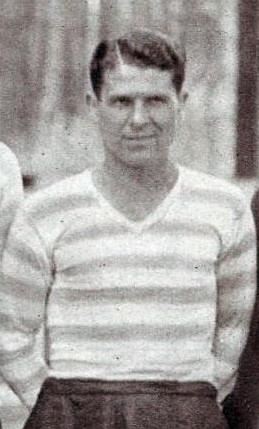

Personal information
- Date of birth: 1 November 1907
- Place of birth: Ris-Orangis, France
- Date of death: 19 December 1990 (aged 83)
- Place of death: Corte, Corsica, France
- Height: 1.69 m (5 ft 7 in)
- Position: Midfielder

Youth career
- 1918-1924: Draveil
- 1924-1927: Étoile Juvisy-Viry

Senior career*
Years	Team	Apps	(Gls)
1928–1929	Stade Français		
1929–1937	RC Paris		
1937–1939	RC Roubaix		
1939–1945	Rouen		
1945–1946	Red Star		

International career
1929–1938	France	41	(2)

Managerial career
- 1940–1945: Rouen
- 1945–1946: Red Star
- 1946–1951: Gent
- 1952/12-1953: Stade Français
- 1954–1955: Le Havre
- 1956–1958: Gent
- 1958–1962: Cercle Brugge
- 1962–1964: Union SG
- 1964–1965: US Corte
- 1966–1969: Club Sportif de Hammam-Lif
- 1969/12-1970: Bastia
- * Club domestic league appearances and goals

Edmond Delfour (1 November 1907 – 19 December 1990) was a French international footballer who played as a midfielder. He played at the 1930, the 1934 and the 1938 FIFA World Cups. Even when he was still a player, he started his coaching career that spanned three decades.

== Club career ==
=== Youth career ===
- 1918-1924 : Draveil
- 1924-1927 : Étoile Juvisy-Viry

=== Senior career ===
- 1928-1929 : Stade Français
- 1929-1937 : RC Paris
- 1938-1939 : RC Roubaix
- 1939-1945 : FC Rouen
- 1945-1946 : Red Star

== International career ==
For France national football team he got 41 caps and scored 2 goals between 1929 and 1938. His first cap was against England on 09/05/1929. His first goal was against Czechoslovakia on 11/05/1930. His second and last goal was against England on 14/05/1931.

He participated at three edition of FIFA World Cup : in 1930, 1934, and 1938. He played the whole 6 France's games in the three tournaments. The 1938 FIFA World Cup quarter-final lost against Italy on 12 June 1938 was his last cap.

He was one of the 6 players to have appeared in all three of the pre-war World Cups. The other being teammates Étienne Mattler and Emile Veinante, Romanian Nicolae Kovács, Belgian Bernard Voorhoof and Brazilian Patesko. He was the last surviving of those 6 players.

== Honours ==
=== Player ===
RC Paris

- Ligue 1 : 1935-1936
- Coupe de France : 1936

== Coaching career ==
While he was still a player, he coached FC Rouen from 1940 to 1945, then Red Star from 1945 to 1946

From 1946 to 1951 he coached Belgian club Gent. He then managed Stade Français from 1952 to December 1953. He then coached Le Havre AC from January 1954 to 1955.

In 1956, he went back to Belgium to coach several clubs: Gent from 1956 to 1958, Cercle Brugge from 1958 to 1962, Union Saint-Gilloise from 1962 to 1964.

From 1964 to 1965 he managed USC Corte. He then coached Tunisian side Club Sportif de Hammam-Lif from 1966 to 1969. He ended his career at SC Bastia from 1969 to December 1970
