= Henri Joncourt =

French footballer (1922–1957)

Personal information
- Date of birth: 14 April 1922
- Place of birth: 4th arrondissement of Paris, France
- Date of death: 8 January 1957 (aged 34)
- Place of death: El Milia, France
- Position: Forward

Youth career
- US Concarneau

Senior career*
Years	Team	Apps	(Gls)
- US Concarneau
1941–1943	Red Star		
1947–1948	Girondins de Bordeaux		
1949–1950	Beauregard		

Managerial career
- 1949–1950: Beauregard
- * Club domestic league appearances and goals

Henri Joncourt (14 April 1922 – 8 January 1957) was a French footballer who played as a midfielder for Red Star in the early 1940s.

== Playing career ==
Born in 4th arrondissement of Paris on 14 April 1922, Joncourt was still a baby when his parents settled in Concarneau, where he began his career at US Concarneau. He only returned to Paris in 1937, aged 15, where he settled and worked at the PTT.

Having joined Red Star in 1941, Joncourt, together with Henri Roessler, Georges Meuris, and Alfred Aston, helped his team win the Coupe de France in 1942, beating Sète 2–0 in the final. (Note: Some sources wrongly claim that he was the author of Red Star's opening goal, when it was actually Roger Vandevelde.) The following day, the journalists of French newspaper L'Auto (the forerunner of L'Équipe) stated that "many of his passes lacked precision; however, he did put in some nice passes to VandeveIde.

In 1943, Joncourt fled Paris to escape STO, returning to his hometown of Concarneau, and after the execution of Pierre Guéguin, he did not hesitate to show his anti-Nazi convictions by joining the Resistance as a FTPF. It was around this time that he befriended Jean Le Guiban, a fellow resistance fighter and football player at Etoile Rosporden. He later took part in the liberation of Concarneau.

== Managerial career ==
In 1949, Joncourt joined Beauregard, where he worked as a player-coach until the end of the season, scoring a few goals as the team finished 11th in the Division d'Honneur West B.

== Death ==
In late 1956, Joncourt, now a reserve officer, left for Algeria, where he was killed on 8 January 1957, at the age of 35.

== Honours ==
Red Star

- Coupe de France: 1941–42
