= Joncourt (surname) =

Joncourt is a French surname. Notable people with the surname include:

- Élie de Joncourt (1697–1765), French writer
- Henri Joncourt (1922–1957), French footballer
- Jean Joncourt (1869–1937), French sculptor
- Pierre de Joncourt (1650–1720), French Protestant preacher and theologian
