= Sidney Selston =

English footballer (1888–1949)

Personal information
- Full name: Sidney Charles Selston
- Date of birth: January qtr. 1888
- Place of birth: Farnham, England
- Date of death: 1949 (aged 60–61)
- Position: Outside forward

Senior career*
Years	Team	Apps	(Gls)
- Royal Garrison Artillery
1912–1913	Southampton	4	(0)
- * Club domestic league appearances and goals

Sidney Charles Selston (1888–1949) was an English footballer who played as an outside-forward in the Southern League for Southampton in the 1912–13 season.

== Football career ==
Selston was born at Farnham, Surrey. He was a soldier in the Royal Garrison Artillery based at Sheerness, Kent and played representative football for the army.

In February 1912, he joined Southampton for whom he made his first-team debut on 22 February 1913 when he took the place of Sid Kimpton at outside-right against Brighton & Hove Albion. The "Saints" had struggled all season and the team was lacking in confidence; this affected Selston who had a tendency to "part with the ball either hurriedly or prematurely". After four appearances, during which he began to control his nerves, he returned to the reserve team and in the summer of 1913, he was released and rejoined his military unit.
