= 1937 Coupe de France final =

- Event: 1936–37 Coupe de France
FC Sochaux-Montbéliard	RC Strasbourg
2	1
- Date: 9 May 1937
- Venue: Olympique Yves-du-Manoir, Colombes
- Referee: Eugène Olive
- Attendance: 39,538

The 1937 Coupe de France final was a football match held at Stade Olympique Yves-du-Manoir, Colombes on May 9, 1937, that saw FC Sochaux-Montbéliard defeat RC Strasbourg 2–1 thanks to goals by Miguel Angel Lauri and Bernard Williams.

== Match details ==
9 May 1937

Sochaux	2–1	Strasbourg
Lauri 40'; Williams 88'		Rohr 32'

Stade Olympique Yves-du-Manoir, Colombes
Attendance: 39,538
Referee: Eugène Olive

GK	(France) Laurent Di Lorto
DF	(France) Gabriel Lalloué
DF	(France) Etienne Mattler	(c)
DF	(France) Roger Hug
DF	(Hungary) János Szabó
MF	(Switzerland) Maxime Lehmann
MF	(Argentina) (France) Miguel Angel Lauri
FW	(Switzerland) André Abegglen
FW	(France) (Switzerland) Roger Courtois
FW	(Czechoslovakia) Vojtěch Bradáč
FW	(Republic of Ireland) Bernard Williams
Manager:
(Uruguay) Conrad Ross Assistant Referees: Fourth Official:

GK	(Hungary) François Mayer
DF	(France) Alphonse Lohr
DF	(Romania) Elek Schwartz
DF	(France) Lucien Halter	(c)
DF	(Austria) Karl Humenberger
MF	(France) Henri Roessler
MF	(France) Frédéric Keller
FW	(Austria) Hans Hoffmann
FW	(Nazi Germany) Oskar Rohr
FW	(France) Oscar Heisserer
FW	(France) Ernest Waechter
Manager:
(Austria) Josef Blum

== See also ==
- 1936–37 Coupe de France
