= Donenfeld =

Donenfeld is a surname. Notable people with the surname include:

- Friedrich Donenfeld (1912–1976), Austrian footballer and manager
- Harry Donenfeld (1893–1965), American comic book publisher
- Irwin Donenfeld (1926–2004), American comic book publisher, son of Harry
- Juliet Donenfeld (born 2009), American actress
