= János Szabó =

János Szabó may refer to:

- János Szabó (abbot) (1767–1858), abbot of the Kolozsmonostor Abbey in Transylvania
- János Szabó (footballer, born 1989), footballer for BFC Siófok, Paksi FC
- János Szabó (footballer, born 1912) (1912–1983), Hungarian footballer and manager
- János Szabó (Minister of Agriculture) (born 1937), Hungarian jurist and former politician, Minister of Agriculture 1993–1994
- János Szabó (Minister of Defence) (born 1941), Hungarian politician, Minister of Defence 1998–2002
- János Szabó (runner) (born 1945), Hungarian Olympic athlete
