= János Szabó (footballer, born 1912) =

Hungarian footballer and manager (1912–1983)

Personal information
- Date of birth: 17 October 1912
- Place of birth: Miskolc, Hungary
- Date of death: 11 April 1983 (aged 70)
- Place of death: Hungary
- Height: 1.75 m (5 ft 9 in)
- Position: Midfielder

Senior career*
Years	Team	Apps	(Gls)
1931–1934	Attila		
1934–1938	Sochaux-Montbéliard	83	(5)
1938–1939	Charleville	27	(6)
1939–1941	Académico		
1941–1947	Famalicão		
1947–1949	Covilhã		

Managerial career
- 1942–1947: Famalicão
- 1947–1956: Covilhã
- 1957–1960: Braga
- 1961: Covilhã
- * Club domestic league appearances and goals

János Szabó (17 October 1912 – 11 April 1983) was a Hungarian footballer who played as a midfielder for Sochaux in the 1930s. After retiring, he became a manager, taking over several clubs in Portugal in the 1940s and 1950s, such as Covilhã and Braga.

== Playing career ==
Born in Miskolc on 17 October 1912, (Note: Some sources wrongly state that he was born in 1913.) Szabó began his career at his hometown club Attila in 1931, aged 19, with whom he played for three years, until 1934, when he moved to France, where he signed for Sochaux.

There, Szabó played alongside several fellow immigrants, such as the Swiss André Abegglen, the Czech Vojtěch Bradáč, and the Irish Bernard Williams, who all helped Sochaux win Ligue 1 in 1934–35 and achieve a runner-up finish in 1936–37. In doing so, he became only the third Hungarian to win the French national title, after György Varga (1933) and István Lukács (1934). On 9 May 1937, he started in the 1937 Coupe de France final, helping his side to a 2–1 win over Strasbourg. (Note: Some sources wrongly state that he also won the Coupe Peugeot in 1930.) The following day, the journalists of the French newspaper L'Auto (the forerunner of L'Équipe) stated that despite not "playing the game expected of him" in the first half, he then "had a worthy second half and was, once again, the keystone of his team".

Szabó stayed at Sochaux for four years, from 1934 until 1938, when he went to Ligue 2 team Charleville, where he played one season. In total, he scored 5 goals in 83 Ligue 1 matches for Sochaux, and 6 goals in 27 Ligue 2 matches for Charleville.

In 1939, Szabó moved to Portugal, where he joined top flight club Académico, with whom he played for two years, until 1941, when he signed for Famalicão as a player-coach, becoming the team's captain in 1943, and then leding Famalicão to a runner-up finish in the Segunda Divisão in 1946. He stayed at Famalicão for six years, from 1941 until 1947, when he signed for Covilhã, also as a player-coach, guiding them to a second division title in 1948.

== Managerial career ==
After retiring in 1949, Szabó remained linked to Covilhã, now as a full-time coach, leading them to a 5th place finish in 1956, the club's best-ever result. The following year, in 1957, he was appointed as the new coach of Braga, which he oversaw for three years, until 1960.

== Death ==
Szabó died on 11 April 1983, at the age of 70.

== Honours ==
FC Sochaux

- Ligue 1:
  - Champions (1): 1934–35
  - Runner-up (1): 1936–37
- Coupe de France:
  - Champions (1): 1936–37

Famalicão

- Segunda Divisão
  - Runner-up (1): 1945–46

Covilhã

- Segunda Divisão
  - Champions (1): 1947–48
