= Pedro Duhart =

Uruguayan footballer (1909–1955)

Personal information
- Full name: Pedro Duhart Etcheverry
- Date of birth: 5 April 1909
- Place of birth: Montevideo, Uruguay
- Date of death: 30 November 1955 (aged 46)
- Position: Forward

Senior career*
Years	Team	Apps	(Gls)
1924–1926	Peñarol San Carlos		
1927–1930	San Carlos		
1931–1934	Nacional	61	(32)
1934–1938	Sochaux	62	(24)
1938–1939	Charleville	24	(7)
1939–1942	Nacional	0	(0)
1940	→ Bella Vista (loan)		
1941–1942	→ River Plate Montevideo (loan)		
Total		147+	(63+)

International career
1931–1932	Uruguay	3	(0)
1935–1937	France	6	(1)

Managerial career
- 1943–1944: Everton Viña del Mar
- 1946: Santiago Wanderers
- * Club domestic league appearances and goals

Pedro Duhart Etcheverry, also known as Pierre (5 April 1909 – 30 November 1955) was a footballer who played international football for both Uruguay and France.

== Playing career ==
Duhart played as a forward for Nacional, Sochaux, Charleville, among others.

== Coaching career ==
Duhart served as manager in Chile for Everton de Viña del Mar and Santiago Wanderers.

== Personal life ==
Duhart was born in Uruguay and was of French descent.
