= Elie Rous =

English football manager

Managerial career
- Years: Team
- 1939–1940: Racing Paris
- 1940–1943: Sète
- 1949–1950: Sète
- 1950: Nice
- 1951–1952: Metz

Elie Rous (Note: Alternatively spelled Élie Rous, Ely Rous or Elly Rous) was an English football manager, active primarily in France.

Rous led Racing Paris to the 1940 Coupe de France title, and was runner-up with Sète in 1942.

He later coached Nice in 1950, and Metz between 1951 and 1952.
