= Georges Meuris =

French footballer (1907–1984)

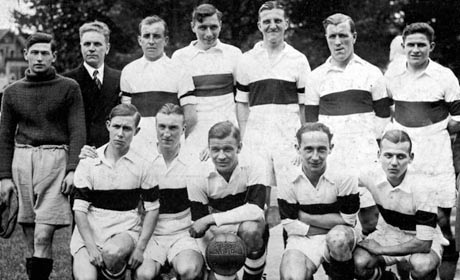
- Meuris (standing, 3rd from the left) in 1933

Personal information
- Date of birth: 14 March 1907
- Place of birth: Forest, Belgium
- Date of death: 8 September 1984 (aged 77)
- Place of death: Bruges, Belgium
- Height: 1.73 m (5 ft 8 in)
- Position: Midfielder

Senior career*
Years	Team	Apps	(Gls)
1924–1927	La Forestoise		
1929–1934	Olympique Lillois		
1934–1935	Montpellier		
1935–1936	Valenciennes		
1936–1942	Red Star		
1942–1947	Angers		
1947–1949	CS Jean-Bouin Angers		

International career
1937	France	1	(0)

Managerial career
- 1942–1947: Angers
- 1947–1949: CS Jean-Bouin Angers
- 1951–1958: Gent
- 1958–1960: Beringen
- 1960–1963: Herentals
- 1963–1966: Cercle Brugge
- 1967–1969: Waterschei SV Thor
- * Club domestic league appearances and goals

Georges Meuris (14 March 1907 – 8 September 1984) was a Belgian-born French footballer who played as a midfielder for Olympique Lillois, Montpellier, and Red Star in the 1930s. He also made one appearance for the French national team in 1937.

== Playing career ==
Born in Forest, Belgium, Meuris began his football career at La Forestoise in 1924, aged 17, where he remained for three seasons, until 1927. In 1929, he joined the French club Olympique Lillois, where he stayed for the next five seasons, standing out as a midfielder, being described as a "tacky half with the courage of a lion". Together with Robert Défossé, Georges Beaucourt, and Georges Winckelmans, he was a member of the OM team that won the inaugural edition of the French professional championship in 1932–33.

After a short stint, Meuris joined Red Star, remaining there for six seasons, until 1942, and playing a major role in helping Red Star win the 1942 Coupe de France, beating Sète 2–0 in the final.

Meuris then worked as a player-coach for Angers for five years, from 1942 to 1947, and a further two years as a player-coach at CS Jean-Bouin Angers, from 1947 to 1949.

== Managerial career ==
Throughout the 1950s and 1960s, Meuris coach several Belgian teams, such as Gent (1951–58), Beringen (1958–1960), Herentals (1960–63), Cercle Brugge (1963–66), and Waterschei SV Thor (1967–69).

== Death ==
Georges Meuris died in Bruges on 8 September 1984, at the age of 77.

== Honours ==
Olympique Lillois

- Ligue 1: 1932–33

Red Star

- Coupe de France: 1941–42

Angers

- French Amateur Football Championship: 1942–43
