= Christian Rouellé =

French footballer (1922–2011)

Personal information
- Date of birth: 17 January 1922
- Date of death: 15 January 2011 (aged 88)

International career
Years	Team	Apps	(Gls)
- France

Christian Rouellé (17 January 1922 – 15 January 2011) was a French footballer. He competed in the men's tournament at the 1948 Summer Olympics.
