= Peter O'Dowd =

English footballer

Personal information
- Full name: James Peter O'Dowd
- Date of birth: 26 February 1908
- Place of birth: Halifax, England
- Date of death: 8 May 1964 (aged 56)
- Position: Defender

Senior career*
Years	Team	Apps	(Gls)
- Selby Town
1926–1927	Bradford Park Avenue	0	(0)
1927–1930	Blackburn Rovers	50	(0)
1930–1931	Burnley	65	(8)
1931–1935	Chelsea	79	(0)
1935–1936	Valenciennes	10	(0)
1936–1937	Torquay United	7	(0)

International career
1932–1933	England	3	(0)
- * Club domestic league appearances and goals

James Peter O'Dowd (26 February 1908 – 8 May 1964) was an English professional footballer who played as a central defender. He won three caps for the England national football team. He retired at the age of 29 after suffering a broken leg while playing for Torquay United.
