= René Llense =

French footballer (1913–2014)

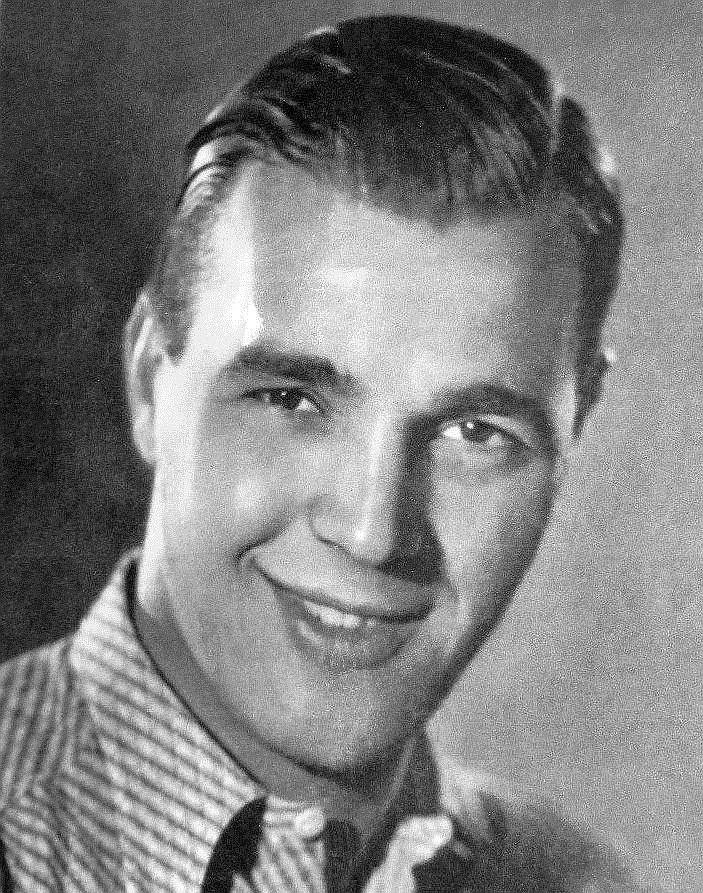
- Llense in 1935

Personal information
- Full name: René Vincent Philippe Llense
- Date of birth: 14 July 1913
- Place of birth: Collioure, Pyrénées-Orientales, France
- Date of death: 12 March 2014 (aged 100)
- Place of death: Sète, Hérault, France
- Position: Goalkeeper

Senior career*
Years	Team	Apps	(Gls)
1931–1938	FC Sète		
1938–1943	Saint-Étienne		
1943–1944	EF Lyon - Lyonnais		
1944–1945	Saint-Étienne		
1946–1947	Toulon		
1947–1949	Vichy		

International career
1934–1939	France	11	(0)
- * Club domestic league appearances and goals

René Vincent Philippe Llense (14 July 1913 – 12 March 2014) was a French footballer who played as a goalkeeper for FC Sète and Saint-Étienne during his club career. He was born in Collioure, Pyrénées-Orientales. He earned 11 caps for the France national team from 1935 to 1939, and participated in the 1934 FIFA World Cup and the 1938 FIFA World Cup. He was their last surviving player to have participated in any of the pre-war World Cups. He turned 100 in July 2013 and died on 12 March 2014.

== See also ==
- List of centenarians (sportspeople)
