= Josef Schneider (footballer) =

Austrian footballer and manager (1901–unknown)

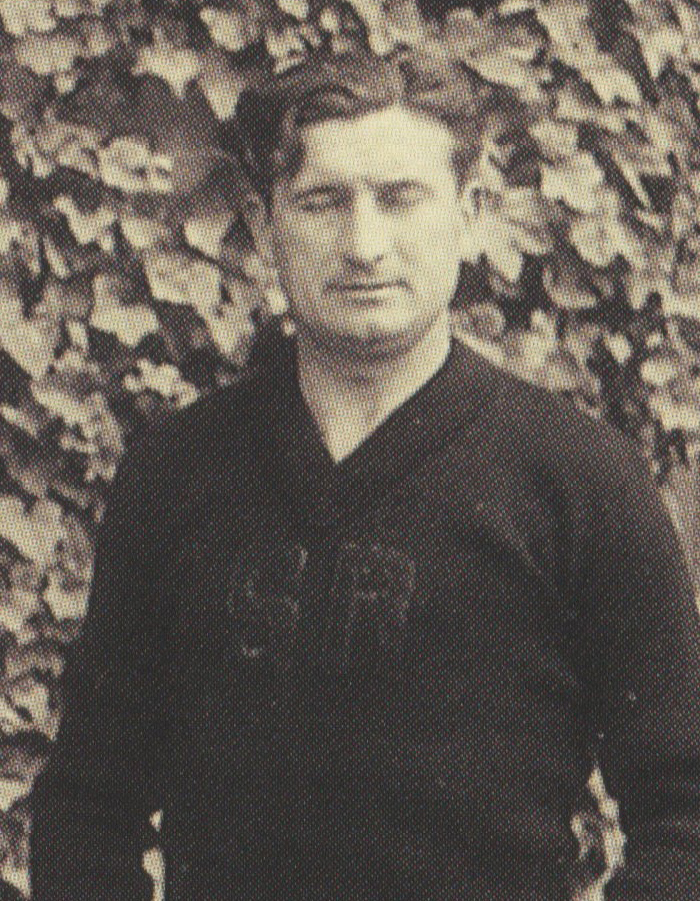
- Schneider in 1935

Personal information
- Full name: Josef "Pepi" Schneider
- Date of birth: 1901
- Place of birth: Austria-Hungary
- Date of death: unknown
- Position: Midfielder

Senior career*
| Years | Team | Apps | (Gls) |
| 1919–1921 | Wiener AF | | |
| 1921–1922 | First Vienna | | |
| 1922–1923 | FC Ostmark Wien | | |
| 1923–1927 | Wiener AC | | |
| 1927–1929 | Hungária FC | | |
| 1929–1930 | New York Hakoah | | |
| 1930–1931 | Brooklyn Wanderers | | |
| 1931–1933 | Grasshoppers | | |
| 1933–1936 | Rennes | | |
| 1936–1937 | Le Havre | | |
| 1937–1938 | Olympique Alès | | |

International career
| 1925–1927 | Austria | 10 | (0) |

Managerial career
- 1933–1936: Rennes
- 1936–1939: Le Havre
- 1939–1940: Austria Wien
- * Club domestic league appearances and goals

Josef "Pepi" Schneider (1901 – unknown) was an Austrian football midfielder and manager.

He played for Wiener AF, SC Bewegung XX, Brigittenauer AC, Austria Amateure, FC Ostmark Wien, Wiener AC, Hungária FC, New York Hakoah, Brooklyn Wanderers, Grasshoppers Zürich, Rennes, Le Havre and Olympique Alès.

He coached Rennes, Le Havre and Austria Wien.
