= Edmond Novicki =

French footballer (born 1912)

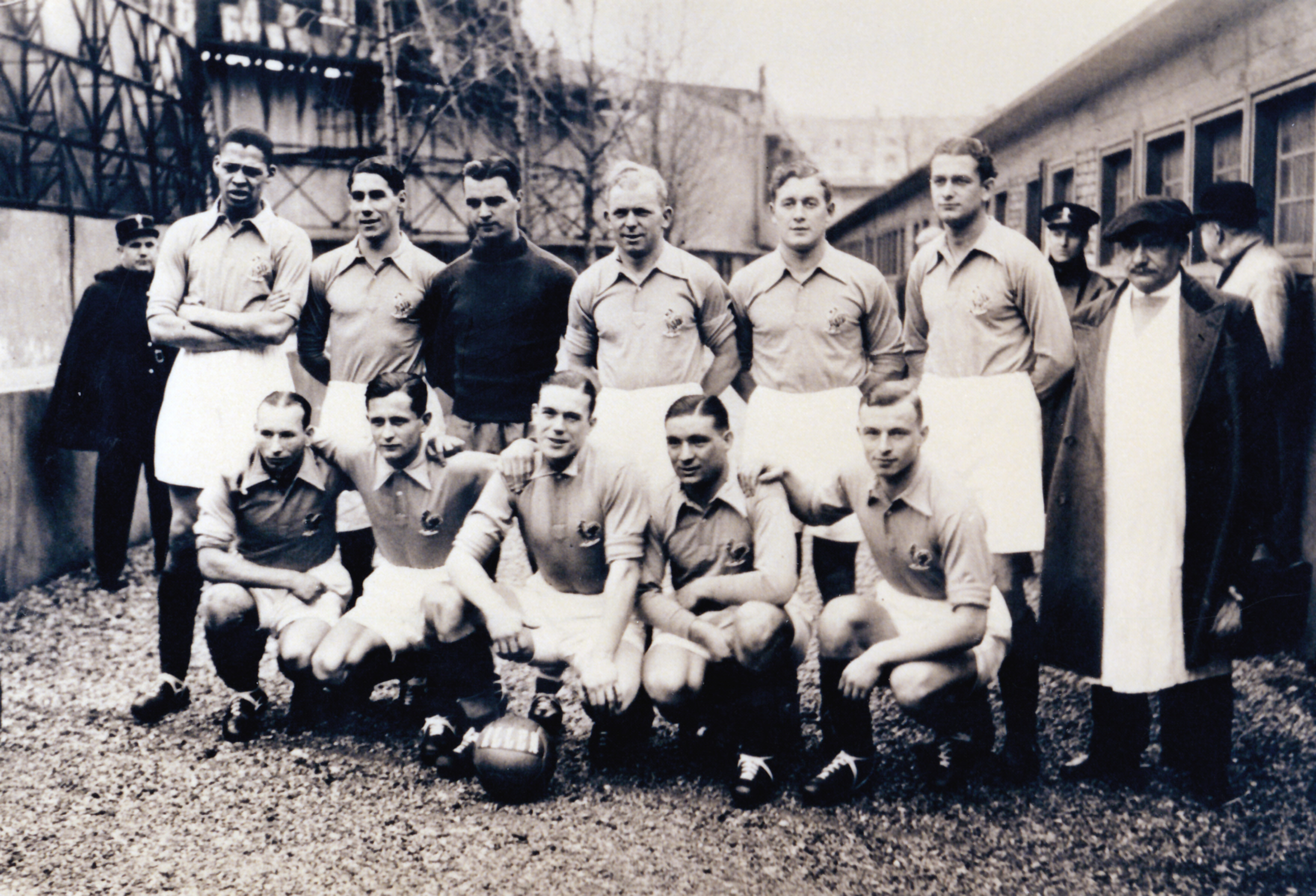
- Novicki with the France national team in 1937

Personal information
- Date of birth: 20 September 1912
- Place of birth: Krapkowice, Poland
- Position: Striker

Senior career*
Years	Team	Apps	(Gls)
1931–1937	Lens		
1937–1938	Valenciennes		
1938–1939	SC Fives		
- FC Sète
- Avignon
1944–1945	Olympique Lillois		
1945–1947	SC Douai		

International career
1936–1937	France	2	(1)
- * Club domestic league appearances and goals

Edmond Novicki (born 20 September 1912) was a footballer who played with Lens, Valenciennes, SC Fives and Olympique Lillois. Born in Poland, he represented the France national team.
