= Les Miller (footballer) =

English footballer

Personal information
- Full name: Leslie Roy Miller
- Date of birth: 30 March 1911
- Place of birth: Romford, England
- Date of death: 1959
- Position: Outside left

Senior career*
Years	Team	Apps	(Gls)
- Barking
?–1931	Northampton Town	0	(0)
1931–1936	Sochaux	76	(27)
1936–1938	Tottenham Hotspur	56	(22)
1939	Chesterfield	2	(0)
- Mansfield Town
- * Club domestic league appearances and goals

Leslie Roy Miller (30 March 1911 – 1959) was an English professional footballer who played for Barking, Northampton Town, Sochaux, Tottenham Hotspur, Chesterfield and Mansfield Town.

== Football career ==
Miller played for Barking, Northampton Town and French club Sochaux before joining Tottenham Hotspur in 1936. The outside left featured in 65 matches and scored on 26 occasions in all competitions for the Lilywhites. In 1939 he signed for Chesterfield where he made two appearances before ending his playing career at Mansfield Town.
