= Jean Sécember =

French footballer (1911-1990)

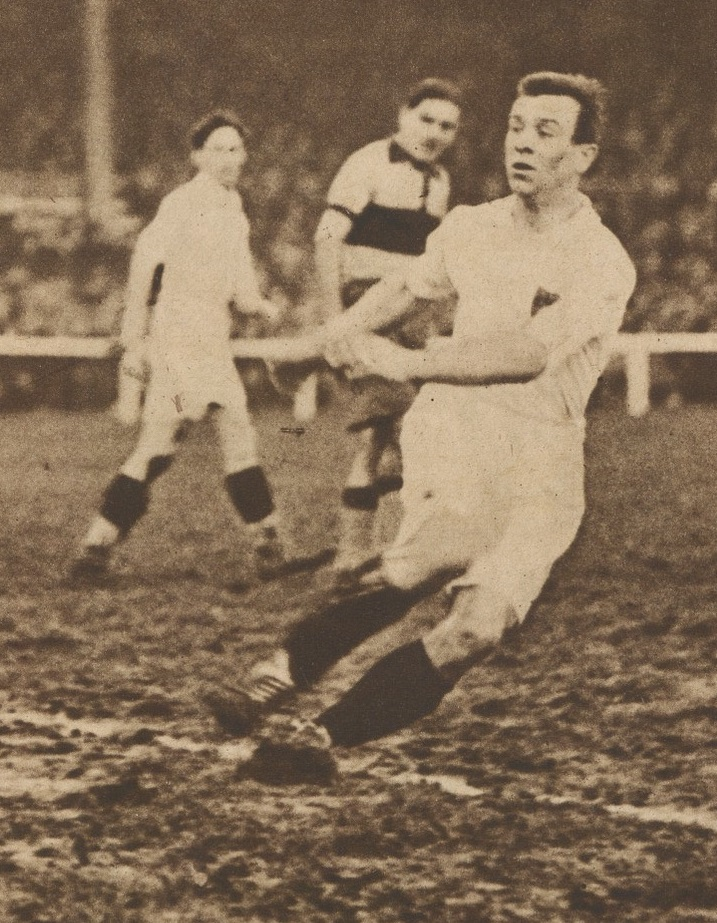

Personal information
- Date of birth: 11 April 1911
- Place of birth: Tourcoing, France
- Date of death: 1990 (aged 79)
- Position: Forward

Senior career*
Years	Team	Apps	(Gls)
1931–1933	US Tourquennoise		
1933–1937	Excelsior AC Roubaix		

International career
1932–1935	France	4	(5)
- * Club domestic league appearances and goals

Jean Sécember (1911-1990) was a French international footballer. He was born on 10 April 1911 in Tourcoing and died in 1990 at the age of 79.

He won four international caps between 1932 and 1935, the first three while he was at the amateur club US Tourquennoise. In 1933 he moved to Excelsior and won his final cap in 1935 against Germany. In June 1932, he scored four goals in a 5–3 win over Bulgaria.
