= Jean Collet =

French writer (1932–2020)

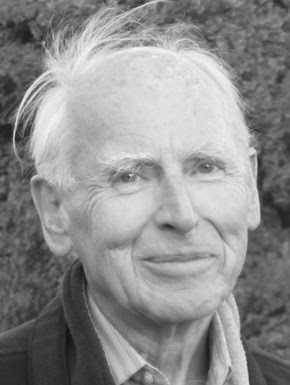
- Jean Collet
- Born: 3 March 1932; Pau, France
- Died: 11 November 2020 (aged 88)
- Occupation: Writer

Jean Collet (3 March 1932 – 11 November 2020) was a French writer, film theorist, and university professor.

== Biography ==
Born in Pau, Collet studied at the École nationale supérieure Louis-Lumière and Paris-Sorbonne University, where he earned a degree in philosophy. He was notably inspired by the work of Gaston Bachelard.

Collet worked as a journalist for Télérama from 1959 to 1971 and at Cahiers du Cinéma from 1961 to 1968. In 1965, he began working as a film critic for Études. He also ran film clubs around France under the authority of the Alliance française.

Collet wrote many books on cinema. In particular, he devoted a monograph to Jean-Luc Godard published by Éditions Seghers. He also worked to make cinema a major in French universities, creating the cinema department at Paris Diderot University. He served as a professor at Paris Descartes University, the Centre Sèvres, and the Institut national de l'audiovisuel. He also worked for Arte. A contributor to Encyclopædia Universalis, he was a film advisor to various other dictionaries and encyclopedias.

Jean Collet died on 11 November 2020 at the age of 88.

== Books ==
- Jean-Luc Godard (1963)
- Le Cinéma en question : Rozier, Chabrol, Rivette, Truffaut, Demy, Rohmer (1972)
- Lectures du film (1977)
- Le Cinéma de François Truffaut (1977)
- La Nouvelle Vague, 25 ans après (1983)
- François Truffaut (1985)
- La Création selon Fellini (1990)
- Après le film (1999)
- John Ford, la violence et la loi (2003)
- François Truffaut. La profondeur secrète d'une œuvre géniale, enfin révélée (2004)
- Petite Théologie du cinéma (2014)
- L'Art de voir un film (2015)
- Tout sur François Truffaut (2020)
