= Julien Darui =

French footballer (1916–1987)

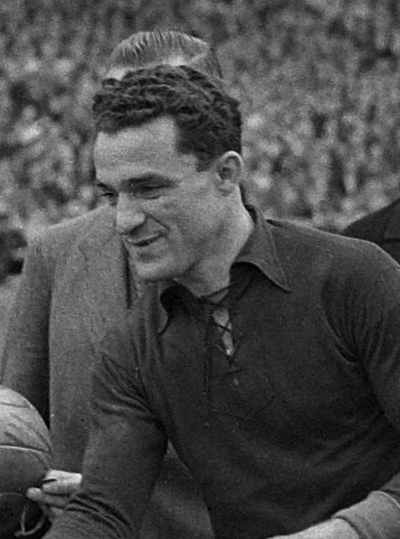
- Darui in 1947

Personal information
- Date of birth: 16 February 1916
- Place of birth: Oberkorn, Luxembourg
- Date of death: 13 December 1987 (aged 71)
- Height: 1.68 m (5 ft 6 in)
- Position: Goalkeeper

Senior career*
Years	Team	Apps	(Gls)
1935–1937	Olympique Charleville	47	(0)
1937–1940	Olympique Lillois	50	(0)
1940–1942	Red Star Olympique		
1942–1943	Lille		
1943–1944	EF Lille-Flandres		
1944–1945	Lille	12	(0)
1945–1953	CO Roubaix-Tourcoing	234	(0)
1953–1954	Montpellier	23	(0)

International career
1938–1951	France	25	(0)

Managerial career
- 1949–1952: CO Roubaix-Tourcoing
- 1953–1954: Montpellier
- 1954–1955: Lyon
- 1959–1960: Dijon
- * Club domestic league appearances and goals

Julien Darui (16 February 1916 – 13 December 1987) was a French football goalkeeper, who had stints as a coach after his playing career.

== International career ==
Darui was born in Luxembourg during World War I, to Portuguese and Italian parents, and emigrated to France at a young age. Darui was capped 25 times for France. In 1999, he was elected best French goalkeeper of the century by L'Équipe.

== Honours ==
=== Player ===
CO Roubaix-Tourcoing

- French championship: 1947

Red Star Olympique

- Coupe de France: 1942
