= Sid Kimpton =

English footballer (1887–1968)

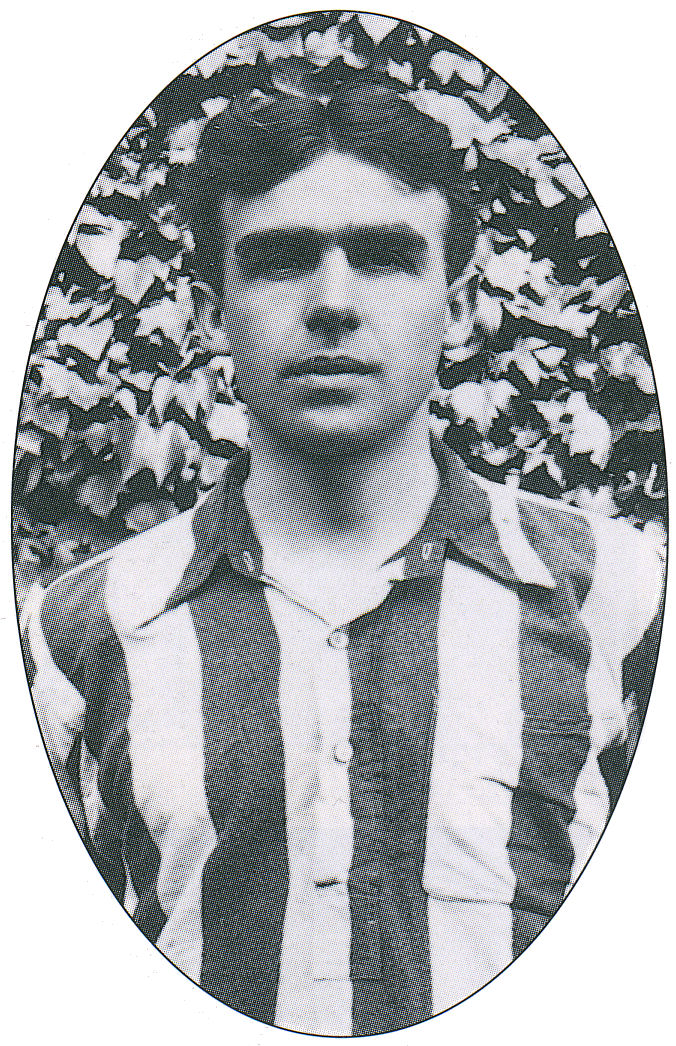
- Kimpton circa 1910

Personal information
- Full name: Gabriel Sibley Kimpton
- Date of birth: 12 August 1887
- Place of birth: Leavesden, England
- Date of death: 15 February 1968 (aged 80)
- Place of death: Leavesden, England
- Height: 5 ft 10 in (1.78 m)
- Position: Striker

Youth career
- Leavesden

Senior career*
Years	Team	Apps	(Gls)
1910–1920	Southampton	141	(27)

Managerial career
- 1921: DFC Prague
- 1921–1922: Polonia Warsaw
- 1923: Cracovia
- 192?–1926: Le Havre
- 1928–19??: Coventry City (coach)
- 1934: France
- 1935–1936: France
- 1935–1938: RC Paris
- 1938: FC Metz
- 1939–1940: Rouen
- 1945: Rouen
- 1945–1946: Le Havre
- 1946–1950: Cherbourg
- * Club domestic league appearances and goals

Gabriel Sibley "Sid" Kimpton, also known as George Kimpton, (12 August 1887 – 15 February 1968) was an English football player, who spent his entire playing career with Southampton and subsequently became a manager in Europe coaching DFC Prague, Polonia Warsaw, Cracovia Le Havre, Coventry City, France national team, RC Paris, Rouen and Cherbourg.

== Playing career ==
Kimpton was born in Leavesden, near Watford and, after playing for his local village team, had an unsuccessful trial with Watford in 1909.

He joined Southern League Southampton in September 1910; after one match for the reserves, he made his first-team debut on 22 October, taking over the centre-forward's role from Percy Prince, in a 3–0 defeat by Crystal Palace. Kimpton scored in his next match a week later, in a 3–2 defeat at Brentford. By the end of the season, Kimpton had made 29 appearances, scoring seven goals, as the "Saints" finished one point above the relegation places.

According to Holley & Chalk, Kimpton's "main value was his reliability and versatility"; he was "never thought of as a great player (but) had plenty of pluck and bustle which made him hugely popular."

For the 1911–12 season, Southampton's new manager George Swift recruited eleven new players, including centre-forward Henry Hamilton from Huddersfield Town. Kimpton retained his place in the side, but moved back to right-half where he played for the first half of the season, before being replaced by John Denby in December. Kimpton returned to the side in March, when he took over the outside-right berth from Jack Wilcox for the rest of the season, at the end of which Southampton were once again just above the relegation zone.

George Swift resigned in the summer of 1912 and Jimmy McIntyre was recruited as "trainer" with Ernest Arnfield returning as "secretary" (manager). The Saints started the 1912–13 season badly, only winning one match by the end of October. As the managerial team tried to improve performances by recruiting new players, Kimpton managed to retain his place in the side, either at centre-forward or on the right-wing, until February when he was dropped.

He returned to the side the following November and continued at outside-right for the rest of the 1913–14 season. He started the 1914–15 season on the wing, before reverting to centre-forward at the end of October, where he remained for the rest of the season, scoring ten goals as the Saints finished in sixth place, their best Southern League finish for five years.

During the First World War, Kimpton worked for Thornycroft but continued to turn out for Southampton in wartime leagues and friendlies.

On the resumption of football in 1919, Kimpton was one of only three pre-war players who were re-signed by Southampton, but he was now in his thirties and only made two appearances in Southampton's final Southern League season. Before he left the Saints, he was rewarded with a benefit match. In his Southampton career, he made 149 appearances in peace-time matches, scoring 30 goals.

== Coaching career ==
Kimpton led the first coaching lessons of the FFFA in 1934. He was then called up to help the France national team for the 1934 World Cup, played in Italy. He had only an advisory role, as the triumvirate Gaston Barreau, Jean Rigal and Maurice Delanghe still led the team.

He brought the WM formation in France. Interviewed by L'Auto magazine about the level of French football players: "The French team could do better. (...) The French players must follow the discipline of football."

Before the World Cup match France-Austria played on 27 May 1934 in Turin, Kimpton asked French midfielder Georges Verriest to do a very tight individual marking on Austrian striker Matthias Sindelar. He said: "You can follow Sindelar everywhere... even to the toilet! ". France lost 3–2 "doubtful goal" against the Wunderteam and more than 4000 people welcomed players and staff at the Gare de Lyon. Kimpton was even acclaimed.

Kimpton left the coaching staff of the France national team just after the World Cup. Gaston Barreau expressed relief, because he did not appreciate Kimpton's tactical options. He returned to his coaching lessons held on Mondays, Thursdays and Saturdays in several stadia of Paris. Alongside his lessons, he became the manager of RC Paris and again brought the WM formation with sport director of les Pingouins, Victor Mestre.

After the defeat of the France national team 3–1 versus Germany on 17 March 1935, the FFFA called up Kimpton to an assistant position to teach WM to French international footballers. Kimpton was still the RC Paris manager at that time and only attended the meetings before the matches in Chantilly and then in Saint-Germain-en-Laye, because Gaston Barreau did not want to lost his prerogatives during the matches. The first results of France were good enough, but at the beginning of 1936, France lost 1–6 at home against the Netherlands and 0–3 versus Czechoslovakia) Kimpton was fired as an assistant but remained physio. Manager Gaston Barreau could now decide the tactics of the French football team.

At RC Paris, Kimpton was also criticised by the Parisian supporters for his "economic football". But he led the team to the French championship in 1936 and to two Coupe de France 1936 and 1939. In 1936, Kimpton cried when Racing won the Coupe de France. In 1939, Kimpton decided with a toss in the locker-room who would play as left-midfielder between André Raux and Louis Wojtkowiak. The five francs coin selected Wojtkowiak.

Kimpton signed for FC Rouen during summer, but World War II temporarily ended football. However, les Diables rouges played well.

During the war, Kimpton was interned by the Germans at the Ilag in Saint-Denis, near Paris. He came back to FC Rouen after the war. Under his management, Rouen won the last war championship.

Kimpton then managed Le Havre AC for one season, and he was fired for poor results. He ended his career with AS Cherbourg.

== Honours ==
=== As a manager ===
RC Paris

- Division 1: 1935–36
- Coupe de France: 1936, 1939
