= OFC Charleville =

French football club

Charleville
- Logo
- Full name: Olympique Football Club de Charleville-Mézières
- Founded: 1904
- Ground: Petit-Bois Stadium; Charleville-Mézières; France
- Capacity: 3,000
- Chairman: Christophe Vaucois
- Manager: Marc Kopniaeff
- League: DH Champagne-Ardennes
- Website: https://olympique-fc-charleville.footeo.com
Home colours

Olympique Football Club de Charleville-Mézières is a French football team from the city of Charleville-Mézières, Ardennes, which plays in Division d'honneur (6th division in the French football league system).

== History ==
The team was founded in 1904 as Association Sportive des anciens élèves de Belair la Villette. The club was renamed Club Ardennais in 1910, Football Club de Charleville in 1927 and then Football Club Olympique Charleville (FCO Charleville) in 1932, in a merger with Olympique de Charleville.

The team became professional in 1935, and played in Division 2 till 1939. In 1936, the club obtained its major achievement by qualifying to the Coupe de France final, but lost against RC Paris. The team had a very defensive strategy for the era, thanks to captain Helenio Herrera.

After the World War II, the club did not retrieve its professional status and found it difficult to get to Division 2. The team was professional from 1994 to 1997, but was forced to forsake playing due to financial problems. The team was relegated to the 6th division, and changed its name as Olympique Football Club de Charleville-Mézières.

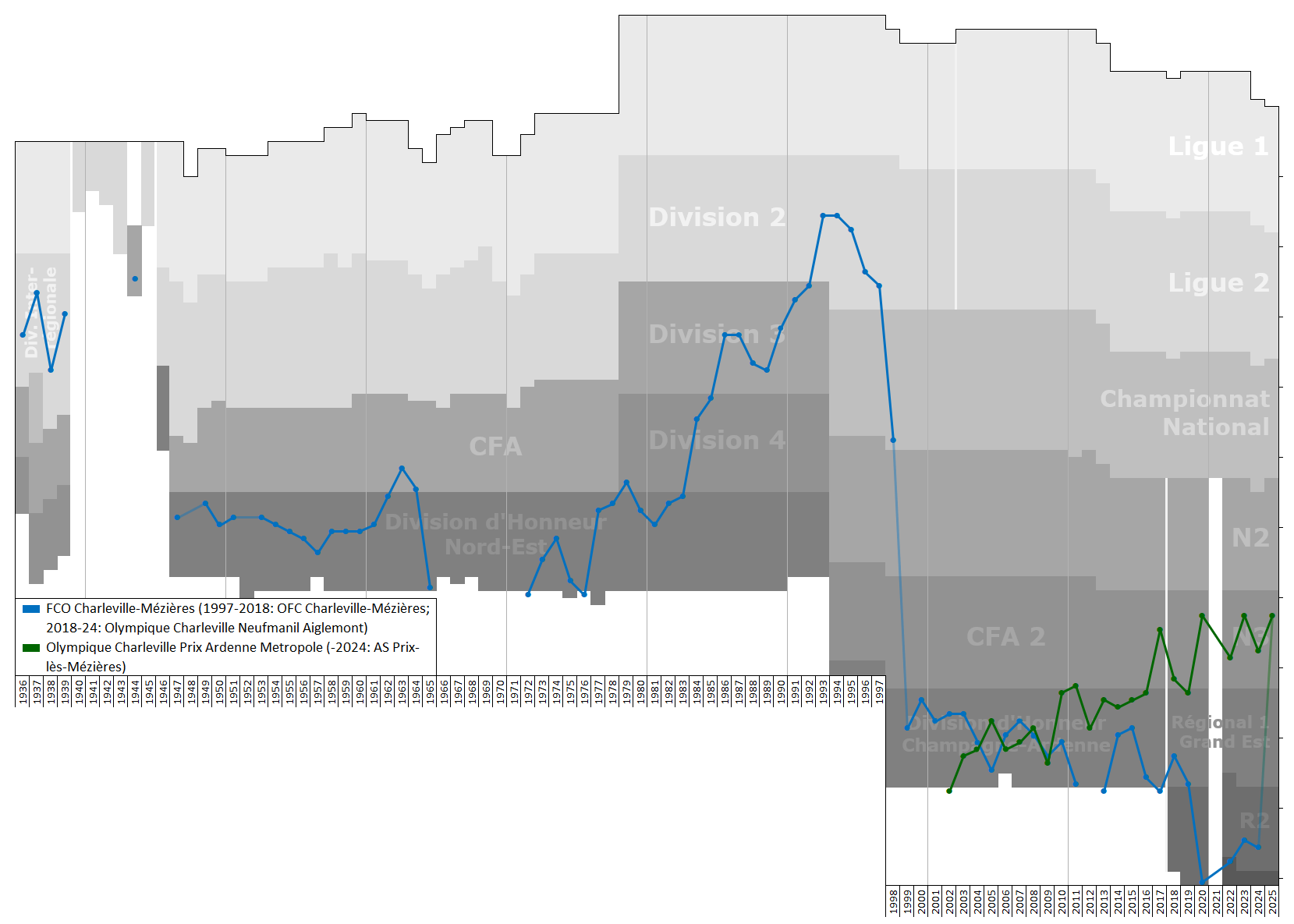
Historical league performance chart of FCO Charleville

== Honours ==
- Coupe de France runners-up: 1936

== Current squad ==
As of 25 January 2009

Note: Flags indicate national team as defined under FIFA eligibility rules; some limited exceptions apply. Players may hold more than one non-FIFA nationality.

No.	Pos.	Nation	Player
—	GK	FRA	Jérémy Mercier
—	DF	FRA	Thibault Marques
—	DF	FRA	Joris Lerolle
—	DF	FRA	Clément Huart
—	DF	FRA	Joffrey Gabriel
—	DF	FRA	Jérémy Henneaux
—	DF	FRA	Guillaume Malherbe
—	DF	FRA	Karim Bouhafara
—	MF	FRA	Benjamin Broutin
—	MF	FRA	Julien Hody
—	MF	FRA	Julien Oneti-Rodriguez
—	MF	FRA	Nicolas Maillet

No.	Pos.	Nation	Player
—	MF	FRA	Anthony Marchand
—	MF	FRA	Ahmed Messaoud
—	MF	FRA	Benjamin Bouchenot
—	MF	FRA	Julien Raulet
—	FW	FRA	Salim Yahiaoui
—	FW	FRA	Joan Oliveira
—	FW	FRA	Jean-Bernard Simon
—	FW	FRA	Jimmy Ravaux
—	FW	BEN	Ludovic Da Souza
—	FW	FRA	Brian Moing
—	FW	FRA	Kevin Galera

== Managerial history ==
- (Austria) Erich Bieber: 1935–1937
- (Austria) Pepi Lehner: 1938–1939
- (France) Segaux: 1951–1952
- (France) Claude Breny: 1982–1984
- (France) Etienne Martinot: 1986–1988
- (France) Denis Troch: January 1990 – 1991
- (France) Moussa Bezzaz: 1991–1997
- (France) Alex Dupont: 1997 – October 1997
- (France) Miguel Vincent: 2003–2004
- (France) Marc Kopniaeff: 2004–
