= Bernard Williams (footballer) =

Irish footballer

Personal information
- Date of birth: 25 August 1908
- Place of birth: Dublin, Ireland
- Date of death: 2004 (aged 95–96)
- Height: 1.70 m (5 ft 7 in)
- Position: Striker

Senior career*
Years	Team	Apps	(Gls)
1932–1947	Sochaux		
- * Club domestic league appearances and goals

Bernard Williams (25 August 1908 – 2004) was an Irish professional footballer active in France during the 1930s and 1940s.

== Career ==
Born in Dublin, Williams played as a striker for Sochaux between 1932 and 1947, winning the French League title in 1935 and 1938, and the French Cup in 1937.
