= Rudi Hiden =

Austrian-French footballer (1909–1973)

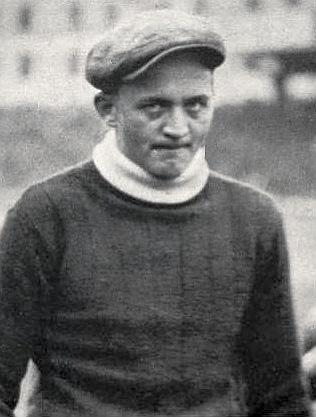
- Hiden in 1939

Personal information
- Full name: Rudolf Hiden
- Date of birth: 9 March 1909
- Place of birth: Graz, Austria-Hungary
- Date of death: 11 September 1973 (aged 64)
- Place of death: Vienna, Austria
- Height: 1.84 m (6 ft 0 in)
- Position: Goalkeeper

Youth career
- 1925–1927: Grazer AK

Senior career*
| Years | Team | Apps | (Gls) |
| 1927–1933 | Wiener AC | 118 | (0) |
| 1933–1940 | RC Paris | 132 | (0) |

International career
| 1928–1933 | Austria | 20 | (0) |
| 1940 | France | 1 | (0) |

Managerial career
- 1951–1952: Salernitana
- 1952–1953: Messina
- 1953–1954: Palermo
- 1956–1957: Messina
- Carrarese
- 1963–1964: Salernitana
- * Club domestic league appearances and goals

Rudolf "Rudi" Hiden (9 March 1909 – 11 September 1973) was an Austrian-French footballer who played as a goalkeeper for Grazer AK, Wiener AC and RC Paris. He was capped internationally by the Austria and France national teams. In later life, Hiden managed several clubs in Italy, including Palermo.

== Playing career ==
Born in Austria and nicknamed Rudi, he was a successful Austrian international and in 1930 Herbert Chapman's Arsenal tried to sign him, but the Players Union and the Football League in England prevented him from doing so. He moved to France in 1933 to play for RC Paris alongside Auguste Jordan and later gained French nationality. Goalkeeper of the Austrian Wunderteam, he was also capped once for France. During the war, he served in the French military, where he also worked as a sports teacher for new recruits.

== Honours ==
RC Paris

- Division 1: 1935–36
- Coupe de France: 1935–36, 1938–39, 1939–40
