= Alfred Aston =

French footballer (1912–2003)

Fred Aston
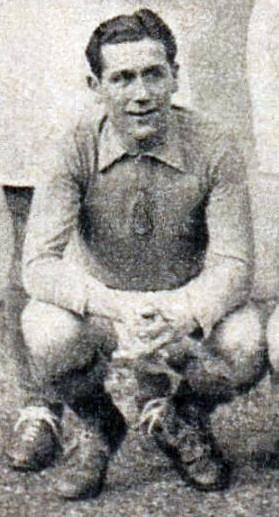
- Aston in 1942

Personal information
- Full name: Alfred Aston
- Date of birth: 16 May 1912
- Place of birth: Chantilly, France
- Date of death: 8 February 2003 (aged 90)
- Height: 1.75 m (5 ft 9 in)
- Position: Winger

Youth career
- Chantilly

Senior career*
Years	Team	Apps	(Gls)
1932–1938	Red Star		
1938–1941	RC Paris		
1941–1946	Red Star		
1946–1947	Angers		
1947–1948	Stade Français		
1948–1949	CA Paris		
1949–1950	Fontainebleau		
1950–1951	AC Amboise		
1951–1956	Tours		

International career
1934–1946	France	31	(5)

Managerial career
- 1948–1949: CA Paris
- 1949–1950: Fontainebleau
- 1950–1951: AC Amboise
- 1951–1956: Tours
- * Club domestic league appearances and goals

Alfred Aston (16 May 1912 – 8 February 2003) was a French football winger and manager. He was part of France national team at the FIFA World Cup 1934 and 1938. He was capped 31 times for his country.

He played football until the age of 44, at FC Tours where he was both player and coach.

He was born to an English father and a French mother.

== Honours ==
Red Star

- Coupe de France: 1942
