= Étienne Mattler =

French footballer and manager (1905-1986)

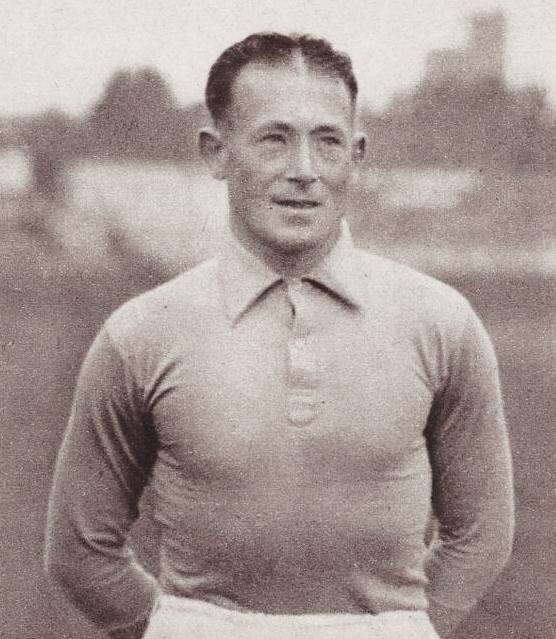
- Mattler in 1937

Personal information
- Date of birth: 25 December 1905
- Place of birth: Belfort, France
- Date of death: 23 March 1986 (age 80)
- Place of death: Sochaux, France
- Height: 1.91 m (6 ft 3 in)
- Position: Full back

Senior career*
Years	Team	Apps	(Gls)
1921–1924	US Belfort		
1924–1926	Strasbourg		
1929–1946	Sochaux		

International career
1930–1940	France	46	(0)

Managerial career
- 1944–1946: Sochaux
- * Club domestic league appearances and goals

Étienne Mattler (25 December 1905 – 23 March 1986) was a French international footballer, nicknamed Le Lion de Belfort, who played as a defender.

== Career ==
Mattler, born in Belfort, played for the clubs US Belfort (1921–1927), AS Troyes (1927–1929), and FC Sochaux (1929–1946) where he won two Ligue 1 titles, in 1935 and 1938, and one Coupe de France, in 1937.

For the national team, he won 46 caps and participated in the 1930, 1934 and 1938 World Cups, being one of five players to have appeared in all three of the pre-war World Cups. He died in 1986, at the age of 80.
