= Robert Défossé =

French footballer (1909-1973)

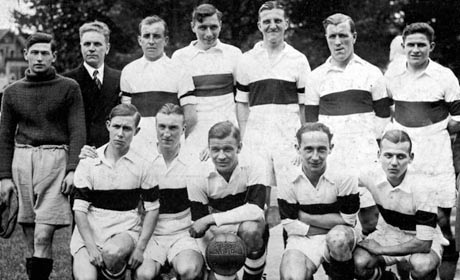

Personal information
- Date of birth: 19 June 1909
- Place of birth: Calonne-Ricouart, France
- Date of death: 30 August 1973 (aged 64)
- Position: Goalkeeper

Senior career*
Years	Team	Apps	(Gls)
- Bully
1932–1938	Olympique Lillois		
1938–1939	Red Star		

International career
1933–1936	France	9	(0)
- * Club domestic league appearances and goals

Robert Défossé (19 June 1909 – 30 August 1973) was a French footballer who played as a goalkeeper.
