= Jules Vandooren =

French footballer (1908-1985)

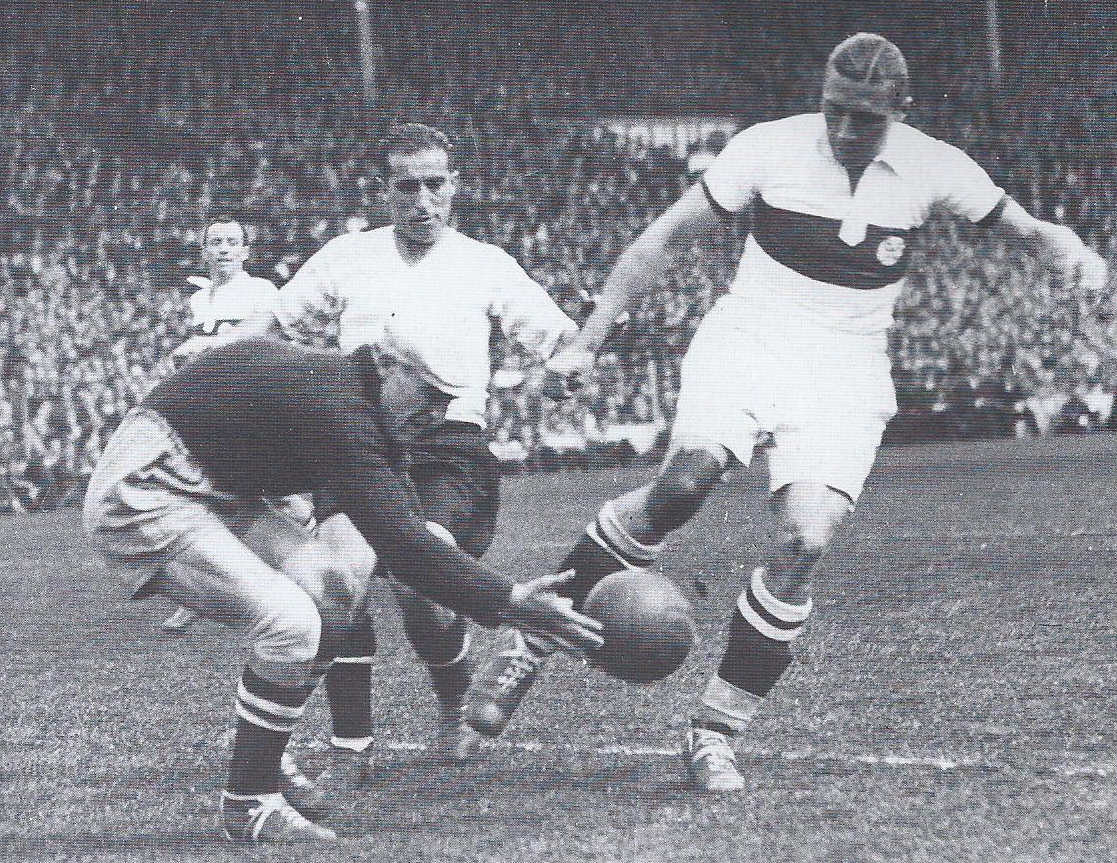
- Jules Vandooren (right), 1939

Personal information
- Date of birth: 30 December 1908
- Place of birth: Armentières, France
- Date of death: 7 January 1985 (aged 76)
- Place of death: Calais, France
- Position: Defender

Youth career
- US Pérenchies
- JA Armentières

Senior career*
Years	Team	Apps	(Gls)
1927–1940	Olympique Lillois		
1940–1941	Red Star		
1941–1943	Reims		

International career
1933–1942	France	22	(0)

Managerial career
- 1941–1943: Reims
- 1943–1948: Orléans
- 1949–1952: Stade Malherbe Caen
- 1952–1956: Gent
- 1956–1959: Orléans
- 1959–1961: Lille
- 1961–1962: Tours
- 1961–1963: Senegal
- 1963–04/1964: UA Sedan-Torcy
- 1964–1966: Orléans
- 1966–1967: Cercle Brugge
- 1967–1971: Gent
- 1971–1972: R.E. Mouscron
- * Club domestic league appearances and goals

Jules Vandooren (30 December 1908 – 7 January 1985) was a French footballer who played as a defender.

Jules Vandooren's career

He played for Olympique Lillois, Red Star FC and Stade de Reims, and was part of France in the 1934 and 1938 World Cups. He then had a long coaching career in France and Belgium.
