= Friedrich Donenfeld =

Austrian footballer (1912–1976)

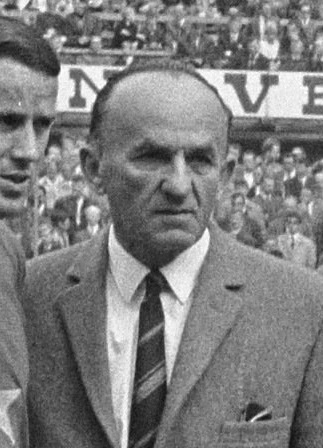
- Donenfeld in 1966

Personal information
- Date of birth: 17 January 1912
- Place of birth: Vienna, Austria-Hungary
- Date of death: 20 March 1976 (aged 64)
- Place of death: Utrecht, Netherlands
- Position: Striker

Senior career*
Years	Team	Apps	(Gls)
1927–1930	Thalia Wien		
1930–1936	Hakoah Vienna		
1936–1937	Maccabi Tel Aviv		
1937–1938	Marseille	9	(1)
1939–1941	Marseille	9	(5)
1942–1943	Marseille	17	(3)
1944–1946	Red Star		

International career
1934	Austria	1	(0)

Managerial career
- 1949: Colombia
- 1949: Deportivo Barranquilla
- 1951–1953: Junior
- 1953–1955: XerxesDZB
- 1955: ADO Den Haag
- 1955: Netherlands
- 1956–1957: Netherlands
- 1958–1959: Enschedese Boys
- 1959–1961: Fortuna Sittard
- 1961–1962: DHC Delft
- 1962–1965: Sportclub Enschede
- 1965–1966: FC Twente
- 1966–1968: MVV
- 1968–1969: VV DOS
- 1974–1975: PEC Zwolle
- * Club domestic league appearances and goals

Friedrich Donenfeld (17 January 1912 – 20 March 1976) was an Austrian professional football player and manager.

He played as a striker for Thalia Wien, Hakoah Vienna, Maccabi Tel Aviv, Marseille and Red Star.

He coached the Colombia national team, Atlético Junior, the Netherlands national team, Fortuna Sittard, DHC, Enschedese Boys, VV DOS, Twente, MVV and PEC Zwolle, among others.
