= Georges Beaucourt =

French footballer and manager (1912–2002)

Personal information
- Full name: Georges Étienne César Beaucourt
- Date of birth: 15 April 1912
- Place of birth: Roubaix, Nord, France
- Date of death: 27 February 2002 (aged 89)
- Place of death: Douai, Nord, France
- Height: 1.82 m (6 ft 0 in)
- Position: Defender

Senior career*
Years	Team	Apps	(Gls)
1930–1938	Lille		
1938–1945	Lens		

International career
1936	France	1	(0)

Managerial career
- 1940–1942: Lens
- * Club domestic league appearances and goals

Georges Étienne César Beaucourt (15 April 1912 – 27 February 2002) was a French footballer who played as a defender. He was in France's squad for the 1934 FIFA World Cup. He played club football with Lille and Lens; he was also the manager of Lens between 1940 and 1942.
