= Racing Club de France Football =

Men's association football team in France

Racing Club de France
- Full name: Racing Club de France
- Nicknames: Les Ciels et Blancs (The sky-blues and whites); Les Pingouins (The Penguins)
- Short name: Racing, RC France, Racing CF, RCF
- Founded: 1896; 130 years ago
- Ground: Stade Léo-Lagrange
- Capacity: 3,500
- Chairman: Patrick Norbert
- Manager: Guillaume Norbert
- League: National 1 Group A
- 2025–26: National 3 Group D, 1st of 14 (promoted)
- Website: www.racingfoot.fr
| Home colours | Away colours |

Racing Club de France Football, commonly known as Racing Club de France (French pronunciation: [ʁasiŋ klœb də fʁɑ̃s]), is a French football club based in the Paris suburb of Colombes.

The club was founded in 1882 as a multisports club, and is one of the oldest clubs in French football history. The club's football section was not founded until 1896. The team plays in the Championnat National 1, the fourth level of French football.

Racing Club de France, founded in 1882, was a founding member of Ligue 1. The club has won one Ligue 1 title (in 1935–36) and five Coupe de France titles (currently the joint fourth-highest total). Racing also played in the Union des Sociétés Françaises de Sports Athlétiques-sanctioned league, France's first championship league. The club debuted in the league in 1899 and won the championship in 1907 after finishing second in 1902 and 1903. The club holds the Ligue 1 record for most goals scored during a 38-match season with 118 goals in 1959–60.

Notable players of the club include Roger Marche, Oscar Heisserer, Thadée Cisowski, Raoul Diagne, Luis Fernández, Maxime Bossis, David Ginola, Luís Sobrinho, Pierre Littbarski, Enzo Francescoli, Alfred Bloch, and Rubén Paz. Diagne spent a decade with the club (1930–1940) and, in 1931, was the first black player on the France national team. He played in the 1938 FIFA World Cup with Abdelkader Ben Bouali, his Racing teammate who was one of the first North African players on the national team. From 2009 to 2012, the club moved to nearby Levallois-Perret after reaching a financial agreement with the commune.

== History ==
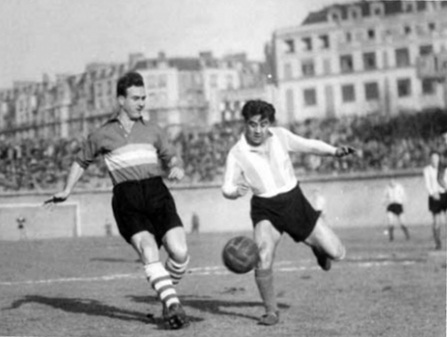
Racing (in dark jersey with horizontal stripes) playing Argentine Racing Club in Parc des Princes, 1950

During the 1900 Summer Olympics, Racing Club de France hosted the athletics events at Croix-Catelan Stadium (the club's previous home). Racing's zenith was the 1930s and 1940s, when the club won Ligue 1 in 1936 and the Coupe de France in 1936, 1939, 1940, 1945 and 1949. The club was also successful in the early 1960s, finishing second in the first division in 1961 and 1962. However, Racing was a focal point of the financial crisis affecting French football during the mid-1960s. The club's financial struggles resulted in its relegation to the lower divisions.

In 1982, businessman Jean-Luc Lagardère wanted to build a team of stars and invested in the club as a second major club in Paris (with Paris Saint-Germain). Although he considered a merger of Paris FC and Racing, the Racing management refused due to a lack of detailed information on PFC finances. Lagardère bought the Paris FC (incurring a debt of more than four million francs) and renamed it "Paris Racing 1". Lagardère invested in experienced players in 1982 and 1983.

Lagardère, determined to lead his club to the European Cup draws in 1987, hired Portuguese coach Artur Jorge after Jorge's victory in the European Cup with FC Porto. He completed the team with Gérard Buscher and Pascal Olmeta. However, the club fell on hard times and attendance declined. During the late 1980s, Racing lost 300 million francs.

The club, relegated to the amateur levels, sought firmer financial footing. In December 2008, Georgios Kintis tried unsuccessfully to buy the club. Before the 2009–10 season, Racing reached a financial agreement with the city of Levallois. The club's association and support from the commune resulted in a name change to Racing Club de France Levallois 92. Despite assistance from Levallois, Racing was relegated to the Championnat de France amateur 2 by the DNCG in July 2010 after it was determined that the club had a €500,000 debt. On 21 November 2010, Racing Levallois and UJA Alfortville announced plans to merge for the following season. In 2012, the club returned to Colombes as Racing Club de France Colombes 92. The club achieved promotion in the 2021–22 Championnat National 3 season to reach Championnat National 1 where they currently compete in Group A.

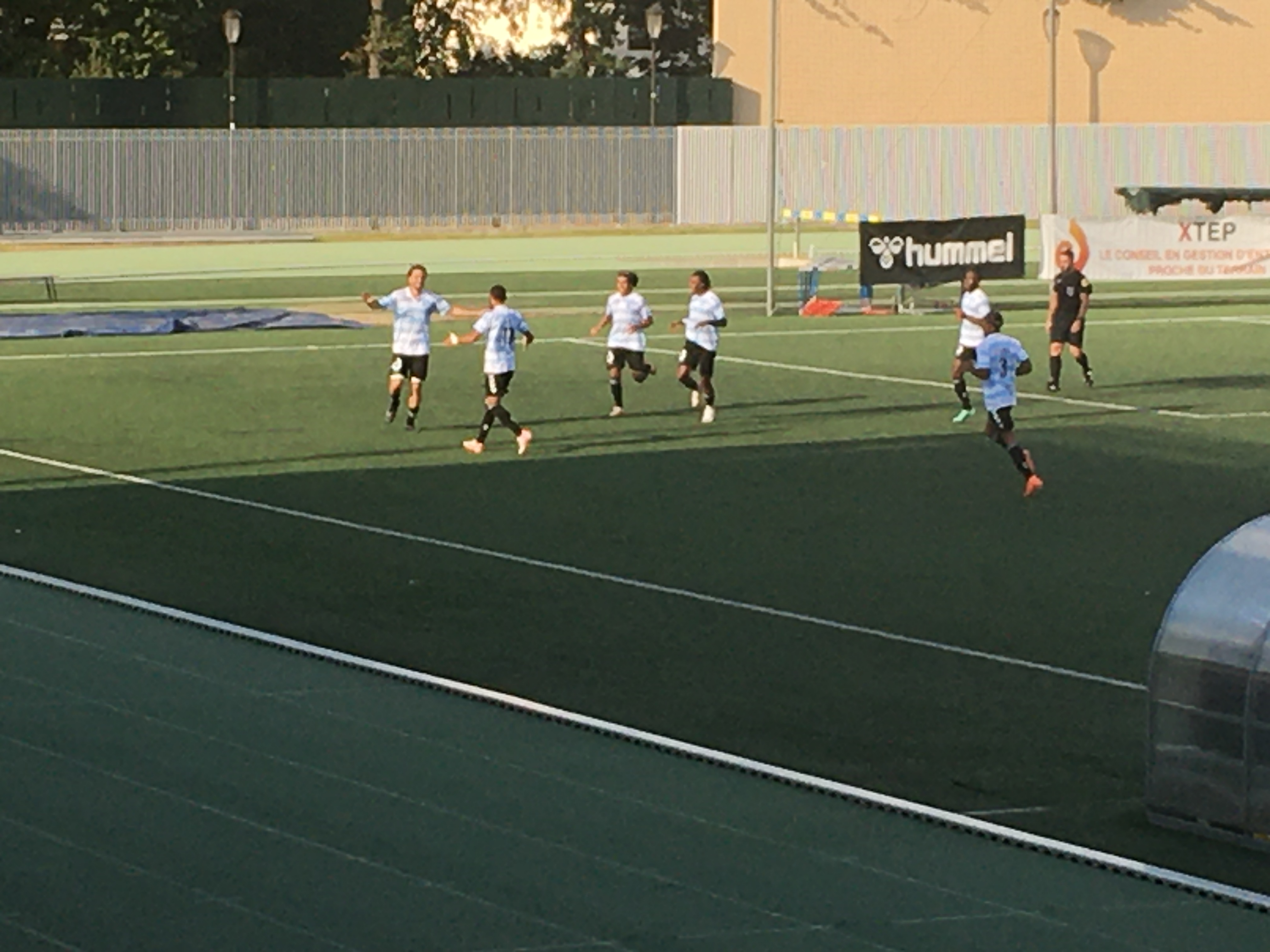
Racing Club de France celebrating a goal against AF Virois during the 2023–24 Championnat National 2 season at the Stade Alphonse Le Gallo.

=== Name changes ===
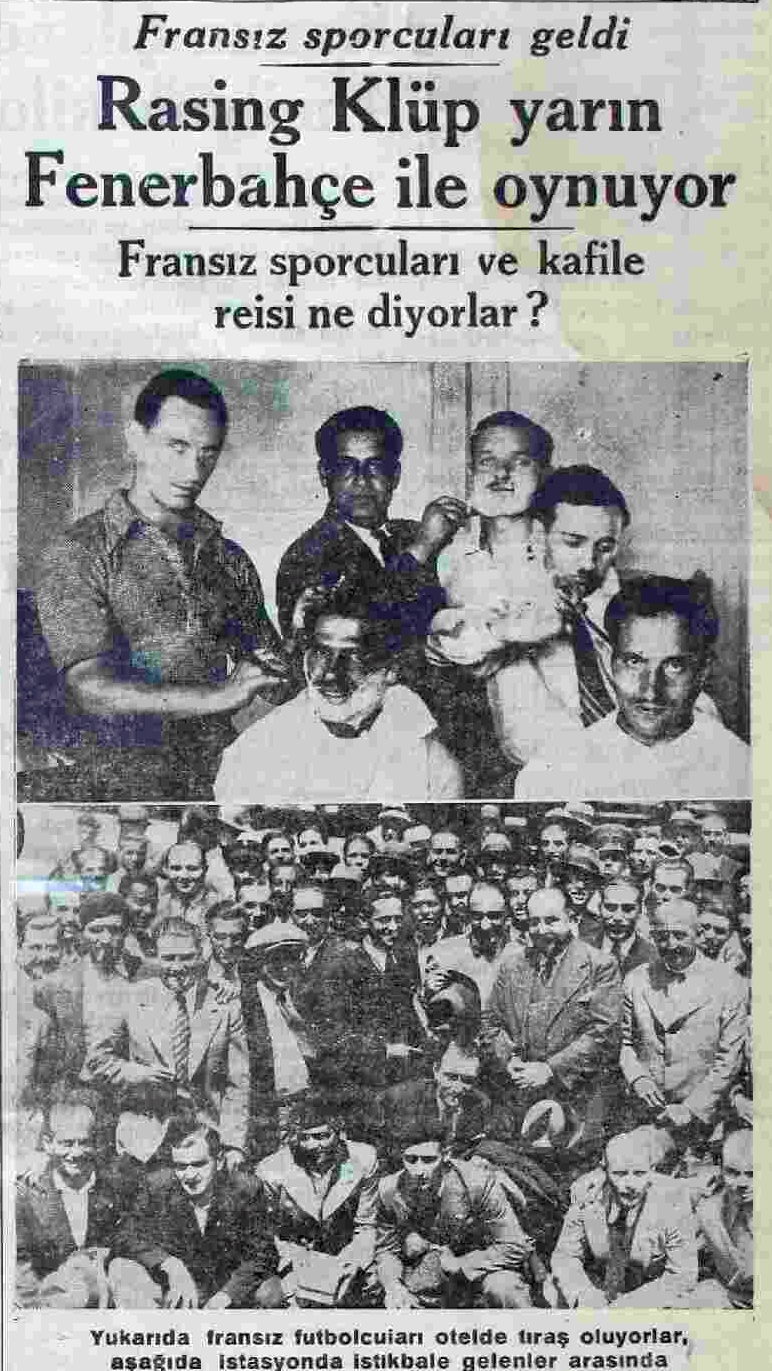
Turkey travel of Racing football players in the evening newspaper dated 30 June 1932

- Racing Club de France: (1896–1932, 1966–1981, 2005–2007)
- Racing Club de Paris: (1932–1966, 1981–1987, 1999–2005)
- Matra Racing: (1987–1989)
- Racing Paris 1: (1989–1991)
- Racing 92: (1991–1995)
- Racing Club de France 92: (1995–1999)
- Racing Club de France football 92: (2007–2009)
- Racing Club de France Levallois 92: (2009–2012)
- Racing Club de France Colombes 92: (2012–2018)
- Racing Club de France Football: (2018–present)

== Players ==
=== Current squad ===
As of 18 August 2022

Note: Flags indicate national team as defined under FIFA eligibility rules; some limited exceptions apply. Players may hold more than one non-FIFA nationality.

| No. | Pos. | Nation | Player |
|---|---|---|---|
| — | GK | ALG | Anis Derkaoui |
| — | GK | GLP | Rubens Adélaïde |
| 16 | GK | MLI | Sory Camara |
| — | DF | FRA | Ouassim Faradji |
| — | DF | FRA | Sabri Daouadji |
| — | DF | FRA | Baila Dia |
| — | DF | SEN | Salif Dramé |
| — | DF | FRA | Abderrahmane Tabbackh |
| — | DF | FRA | Valentin Tacheau |
| — | DF | FRA | Yohan Somme |
| — | DF | FRA | Maxime Da Veiga |
| — | MF | FRA | Adama Camara |

| No. | Pos. | Nation | Player |
|---|---|---|---|
| — | MF | FRA | Adama Niakaté |
| — | MF | FRA | Charles-André Raux-Yao |
| — | MF | FRA | Fabien Lippmann |
| — | MF | FRA | Mohamed El Kourchi |
| — | MF | FRA | Merwan Ifnaoui |
| — | MF | FRA | Walid Aït Draoui |
| — | MF | FRA | Romain Vidot |
| — | MF | FRA | Jason Jacqueray |
| — | FW | FRA | Lilian Ricol |
| — | FW | FRA | Moriba Traoré |
| — | FW | FRA | Arnold Vula |

=== Past players ===
The following players have represented Racing in league and international competition since the club's foundation in 1882. They have played in at least 100 official matches for the club, or achieved prominence elsewhere. For a complete list of RCF Paris players, see Category:Racing Club de France football Colombes 92 players.

- (France) Pierre Allemane
- (France) Manuel Anatol
- (France) Henri Bard
- (France) Alfred Bloch
- (France) Luis Fernández
- (France) Maxime Bossis
- (France) Thadée Cisowski
- (France) Edmond Delfour
- (France) Raoul Diagne
- (France) David Ginola
- (Morocco) Youssef Darbaki
- (France) Oscar Heisserer
- (France) François Heutte
- (France) Auguste Jordan
- (France) Jean-Jacques Marcel
- (France) Roger Marche
- (Netherlands) Sonny Silooy
- (France) Pascal Olmeta
- (France) Roger Quenolle
- (France) Ernest Vaast
- (France) Guy Van Sam
- (France) Émile Veinante
- (France) René Vignal
- (Algeria) Halim Benmabrouk
- (Algeria) Rabah Madjer
- (Norway) Arne Larsen Økland
- (Cameroon) Eugène Ekéké
- (Austria) Rodolphe Hiden
- (Hungary) Joseph Ujlaki
- (Germany) Pierre Littbarski
- (Morocco) Abderrahman Mahjoub
- (Turkey) Vahap Özaltay
- (Uruguay) Enzo Francescoli
- (Socialist Federal Republic of Yugoslavia) Miloš Milutinović
- (Iceland) Albert Guðmundsson
- (Morocco) Walid Regragui

== Officials ==
- President : Patrick Norbert
- Vice-president : Guillaume Norbert
- General secretary : –
- Manager : Guillaume Norbert
- Assistant manager : Serge Gnonsoro

=== Managers ===
| Year(s) | Name |
|---|---|
| 1932–1933 | Curtis Booth |
| 1933–1934 | Peter Farmer |
| 1934–1935 | Jimmy Hogan |
| 1935–1939 | George Kimpton |
| 1939–1940 | Elie Rous |
| 1940–1943 | Émile Veinante |
| 1943–1944 | Robert Fischer |
| 1944–1952 | Paul Baron |
| 1952 | Auguste Listello |
| 1952–1958 | Auguste Jordan |
| 1958–1964 | Pierre Pibarot |
| 1964 | André Jeampierre |
| 1964–1965 | Paul Baron |
| 1965–1966 | Lucien Troupel |
| 1970–1975 | Paul Jurilli |
| 1978–1982 | Jean-Marie Lawniczak |

| Year(s) | Name |
|---|---|
| 1982–1984 | Alain De Martigny |
| 1984–1986 | Victor Zvunka |
| 1986 | Silvester Takač |
| 1986–1987 | Victor Zvunka |
| 1987–1988 | Artur Jorge |
| 1988–1989 | René Hauss |
| 1989–1990 | Henryk Kasperczak |
| 1990–1992 | Luc Bruder |
| 1992–1993 | Camille Choquier |
| 1993–2000 | Jean-Marie Lawniczak |
| 2000–2002 | Jean-Michel Cavalli |
| 2002 | Régis Roch |
| 2002–2004 | Jean-Guy Wallemme |
| 2004–2005 | Stéphane Paille |
| 2008–2010 | Ali Tabti |
| June 2010–June 2013 | Azzedine Meguellatti |
| 2013–2014 | Didier Tardiveau |
| 2014–26 Oct 2015 | Manuel Abreu |
| 27 Oct 2015–Oct 2017 | Armand Bouzaglou |
| Oct 2017–May 2018 | Alexandre Gavache |
| 28 May–5 Dec 2018 | Abdellah Mourine |
| 4 Jan–3 June 2019 | Emmanuel Trégoat |
| 6 June 2019–present | Guillaume Norbert |

== Honours ==
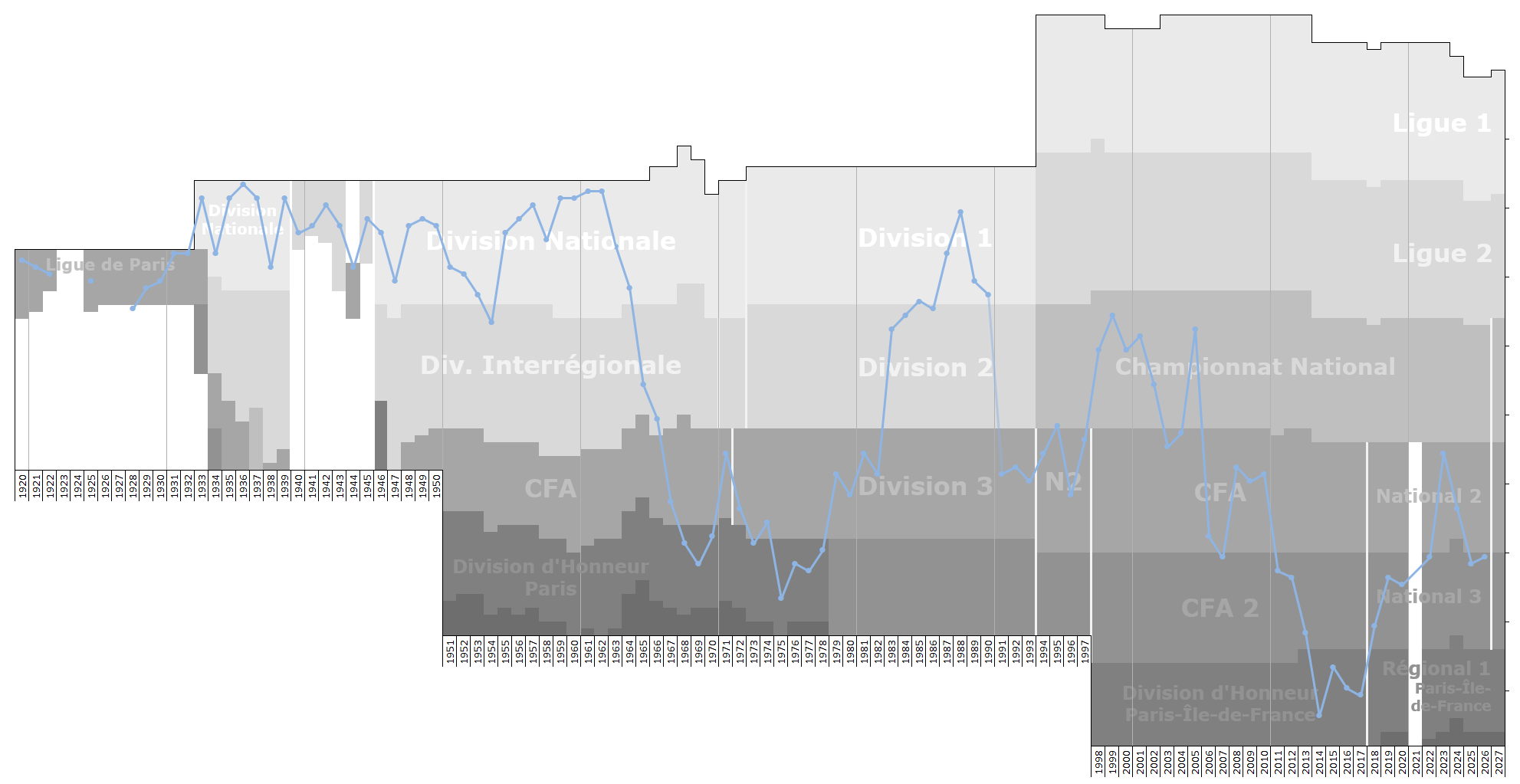
Historical league performance chart of Racing Club de France

- Ligue 1 champions: 1935–36
  - Runners-up: 1960–61, 1961–62
- Ligue 2 champions: 1985–86
- Championnat National 1: 2003–04 (Group D)
- Championnat National 2: 2006–07 (Group F), 2022 (Group L)
- Division d'Honneur (Paris Île-de-France) championship: 1973
- Coupe de France champions: 1935–36, 1938–39, 1939–40, 1944–45, 1948–49
  - Runners-up: 1929–30, 1949–50, 1989–90
- Union des Sociétés Françaises de Sports Athlétiques Championship: 1907
- USFSA Paris Championship: 1902, 1903, 1907, 1908, 1911, 1919
- FFFA Ligue de Paris champions: 1931, 1932
- Coupe Dewar champions: 1905, 1906, 1907, 1912
  - Runners-up: 1901
