= Auguste Jordan =

French footballer (1909–1990)

Personal information
- Full name: August Jordan
- Date of birth: 21 February 1909
- Place of birth: Linz, Austria
- Date of death: 17 May 1990 (aged 81)
- Position: Midfielder

Youth career
- Linzer ASK

Senior career*
Years	Team	Apps	(Gls)
1924–1932	Linzer ASK		
1932–1933	Floridsdorfer AC		
1933–1945	RC Paris		

International career
1938–1945	France	16	(1)

Managerial career
- 1940–1941: SAS Epinal
- 1947–1948: Red Star Olympique
- 1949–1950: Marseille
- 1950–1953: 1. FC Saarbrücken
- 1950–1952: Saarland
- 1953–1958: RC Paris
- 1963–1964: Standard de Liège
- * Club domestic league appearances and goals

August "Auguste" Jordan (21 February 1909 – 17 May 1990) was a French footballer who played as a midfielder and became a coach after his playing career.

== Playing career ==
Born in Austria as August Jordan, he moved to France in 1933 and became French in 1938. His integration to France national team during World War II was highly discussed because he was not a born and bred French, moreover an Austrian. He was a participant for them at the 1938 FIFA World Cup. This integration caused him to be jailed by the Wehrmacht during the war. In France, he was nicknamed "Gusti" and "the baby from Linz".

== Honours ==
=== As a player ===
- French championship: 1936
- Coupe de France: 1936, 1939, 1940, 1945

=== As a coach ===
Standard Liège

- Belgian First Division A: 1963
