= Raoul Diagne =

French footballer (1910–2002)

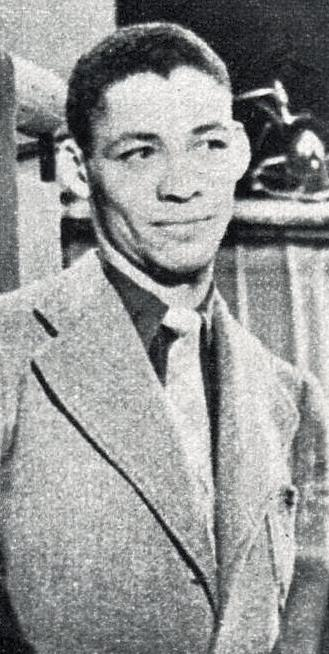
- Diagne pictured in 1938

Personal information
- Date of birth: 10 November 1910
- Place of birth: Saint-Laurent-du-Maroni, French Guiana
- Date of death: 4 November 2002 (aged 91)
- Place of death: Créteil, France
- Height: 1.87 m (6 ft 2 in)
- Position: Defender

Senior career*
Years	Team	Apps	(Gls)
1930–1940	RC Paris		
1940–1944	Toulouse		
1944–1946	FC Annecy		

International career
1931–1940	France	18	(0)

Managerial career
- 1960–1961: Senegal
- * Club domestic league appearances and goals

Raoul Diagne (10 November 1910 – 4 November 2002) was a French footballer who played as a defender professionally in France and for the France national team. He worked as a coach after his playing career.

== Career ==
Born in Saint-Laurent-du-Maroni in French Guiana, Diagne, son of politician Blaise Diagne, was raised in Paris. The young Diagne was a brilliant student, but his passion for football was much stronger than that for studying, despite pressure from his father. Initially cut by French professional football team Stade Français, Raoul Diagne signed at the age of 16 with Racing Club de Paris. A tall, elegant, and versatile defender who was excellent in the air, Diagne was the first black player to be selected for the France national team. He earned 18 caps with the national team. The French press nicknamed Diagne the "Black Spider", given his impressive height (1.87 m) and limb reach. Playing in Paris, Diagne was close to the star Josephine Baker, who affectionately called him "my little brother." He was a prominent figure in the "black Paris" of the time, alongside boxer Panama Al Brown.

Diagne could play any position on the field, goalkeeper included. Despite his imposing size and his primary role as a defender, his preferred position was as a right wing. It was as a very offensive-minded right back defender that he made his career on the France team. In fact, it was not uncommon to see Raoul exchange his position with the actual right winger in order to seek a result at the end of the game.

At the end of the 1940s, after finishing his playing career in Toulouse (until 1942), Annecy (1942–1945) and Nice (1945–1947), he obtained his coaching diplomas and practiced in Belgium, Algeria, and Normandy. Of Senegalese descent, in the early 1960s Diagne became the first coach of the Senegal national team.

Diagne died on 4 November 2002 in Créteil, a southeastern suburb of the Paris metropolitan area. The "Black Spider" was 91 years old and France football mourned the loss of a star and pioneer.

== Honours ==
=== As a player ===
RC Paris

- French championship: 1936
- Coupe de France: 1936, 1939, 1940
