= Émile Veinante =

French footballer and coach (1907-1983)

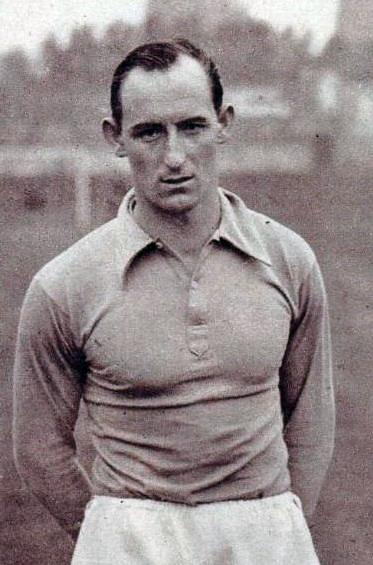
- Veinante in 1937

Personal information
- Date of birth: 12 June 1907
- Place of birth: Metz, Germany
- Date of death: 18 November 1983 (aged 76)
- Place of death: Dury, France
- Position: Striker

Youth career
- 1916–: Metz

Senior career*
Years	Team	Apps	(Gls)
–1929	Metz		
1929–1940	RC Paris		

International career
1929–1940	France	24	(14)

Managerial career
- 1940–1943: RC Paris
- 1945–1947: Strasbourg
- 1948–1949: Strasbourg
- 1949–1950: Nice
- 1950–1951: Metz
- 1951–1955: Nantes
- 1960–1961: Strasbourg
- * Club domestic league appearances and goals

Émile Veinante (12 June 1907 – 18 November 1983) was a French football player and coach. A striker, he represented FC Metz and RC Paris at club level while scoring 14 goals in 24 appearances with the France national team.

== Club career ==
Veinante was born in Metz. Primarily a forward, he began his club career in 1916 with the youth squad at FC Metz, which was at that time (before the end of the First World War) still in German-controlled Alsace-Lorraine. He stayed with FC Metz until 1929, when he moved to Racing Club de Paris in the French first division from 1929 to 1940, with whom he won the French double in 1936, winning the national championship and the cup title. He was named French player of the year in that year. He retired from professional club soccer in 1940.

== International career ==
Between February 1929 and January 1940 Veinante played 24 international matches for the France national team, scoring 14 goals. He appeared in the 1930 and 1938 World Cups, and as a reserve in 1934. In 1938, against Belgium, he scored a goal in the first minute of play.

== Managerial career ==
In 1940 Veinante became manager of Racing Paris, until 1943. He also managed RC Strasbourg Alsace from 1945 to 1947 and in 1948–49, OGC Nice in 1949–50, FC Metz in 1950–51, FC Nantes from 1951 to 1955, and RC Strasbourg again in 1960–61.

== Death ==
He died in 1983 in Dury, Somme.
