= List of French second division champions =

The French second division Champions are the winners of the second highest league of football in France, Ligue 2.

The winner also earns promotion to the first division Ligue 1, as do the second-place and third-place finisher. Ligue 2 was inaugurated in the 1933–34 season under the authority of the French Football Federation. Following World War II, the league assumed its identity under the Ligue de Football Professionnel.

== Ligue 2 champions ==
- List of Ligue 2 winners and runners-up:

Season	Winners	Runners-up
1933–34	Gr. North: Red Star **(1)**; Gr. South: Alès **(1)**	Gr. North: Rouen; Gr. South: Saint-Étienne
1934–35	Metz **(1)**	Valenciennes
1935–36	Rouen **(1)**	RC Roubaix
1936–37	Lens **(1)**	Valenciennes
1937–38	Le Havre **(1)**	Saint-Étienne
1938–39	Red Star **(2)**	Rennes
1939–45	World War II	
1945–46	Gr. North: FC Nancy (1); Gr. South: Montpellier (1)	Gr. North: Stade Français; Gr. South: Toulouse (1937)
1946–47	Sochaux (1)	Alès
1947–48	Nice (1)	Colmar
1948–49†	Lens **(2)**	Bordeaux
1949–50	Nîmes (1)	Le Havre
1950–51	Lyon (1)	Metz
1951–52	Stade Français (1)	Montpellier
1952–53	Toulouse (1937) (1)	Monaco
1953–54	Lyon **(2)**	Troyes
1954–55	Sedan (1)	Red Star
1955–56	Rennes (1)	Angers
1956–57	Alès **(2)**	Béziers
1957–58	FC Nancy **(2)**	Rennes
1958–59	Le Havre **(2)**	Stade Français
1959–60	Grenoble (1)	FC Nancy
1960–61	Montpellier **(2)**	Metz
1961–62	Grenoble (2)	Valenciennes
1962–63	Saint-Étienne (1)	Nantes
1963–64	Lille (1)	Sochaux
1964–65	Nice (2)	Red Star
1965–66	Reims (1)	Marseille
1966–67	Ajaccio (1)	Metz
1967–68	Bastia (1)	Nîmes
1968–69	Angers (1)	Angoulême
1969–70	Nice **(3)**	Nancy
1970–71	Gr. North: Lille; Gr. Centre: **Paris Saint-Germain** (1); Gr. South: Monaco	Gr. North: Chaumont; Gr. Centre: Rouen; Gr. South: Avignon
1971–72	Gr. A: Sedan; Gr. B: **Valenciennes** (1); Gr. C: Strasbourg	Gr. A: Troyes; Gr. B: Limoges; Gr. C: Avignon
1972–73	Gr. A: **Lens** **(3)**; Gr. B: Troyes	Gr. A: Boulogne; Gr. B: Monaco
1973–74	Gr. A: **Lille** (2); Gr. B: Red Star	Gr. A: Valenciennes; Gr. B: Paris Saint-Germain
1974–75	Gr. A: Valenciennes; Gr. B: **Nancy** (1)	Gr. A: Rouen; Gr. B: Avignon
1975–76	Gr. A: Rennes; Gr. B: **Angers** (2)	Gr. A: Laval; Gr. B: Red Star
1976–77	Gr. A: Monaco; Gr. B: **Strasbourg** (1)	Gr. A: Gueugnon; Gr. B: Rouen
1977–78	Gr. A: Angers; Gr. B: **Lille** **(3)**	Gr. A: Besançon; Gr. B: Paris FC
1978–79	Gr. A: **Gueugnon** (1); Gr. B: Brest	Gr. A: Avignon; Gr. B: Lens
1979–80	Gr. A: Tours; Gr. B: **Auxerre** (1)	Gr. A: Rennes; Gr. B: Avignon
1980–81	Gr. A: Montpellier; Gr. B: **Brest** (1)	Gr. A: Toulouse; Gr. B: Nœux-les-Mines
1981–82	Gr. A: **Toulouse** (1); Gr. B: Rouen	Gr. A: Thonon; Gr. B: Mulhouse
1982–83	Gr. A: **Rennes** (2); Gr. B: Toulon	Gr. A: Nîmes; Gr. B: Reims
1983–84	Gr. A: Marseille; Gr. B: **Tours** (1)	Gr. A: Nice; Gr. B: RCF Paris
1984–85	Gr. A: **Le Havre** **(3)**; Gr. B: Nice	Gr. A: Mulhouse; Gr. B: Saint-Étienne
1985–86	Gr. A: Saint-Étienne; Gr. B: **RCF Paris** (1)	Gr. A: Alès; Gr. B: Mulhouse
1986–87	Gr. A: Niort; Gr. B: **Montpellier** **(3)**	Gr. A: Caen; Gr. B: Lyon
1987–88	Gr. A: Sochaux (2); Gr. B: **Strasbourg** (2)	Gr. A: Lyon; Gr. B: Caen
1988–89	Gr. A: Mulhouse; Gr. B: **Lyon** (3)	Gr. A: Brest; Gr. B: Nîmes
1989–90	Gr. A: **Nancy** (2); Gr. B: Rennes	Gr. A: Strasbourg; Gr. B: Valenciennes
1990–91	Gr. A: Nîmes; Gr. B: **Le Havre** **(4)**	Gr. A: Strasbourg; Gr. B: Lens
1991–92	Gr. A: Valenciennes; Gr. B: **Bordeaux** (1)	Gr. A: Angers; Gr. B: Strasbourg
1992–93	Gr. A: **Martigues** (1); Gr. B: Angers	Gr. A: Cannes; Gr. B: Rennes
1993–94	Nice (4)	Rennes
1994–95	Marseille (1)	Guingamp
1995–96	Caen (1)	Marseille
1996–97	Châteauroux (1)	Toulouse
1997–98	Nancy (3)	Lorient
1998–99	Saint-Étienne (2)	Sedan
1999–2000	Lille (4)	Guingamp
2000–01	Sochaux (3)	Lorient
2001–02	Ajaccio (2)	Strasbourg
2002–03	Toulouse (2)	Le Mans
2003–04	Saint-Étienne (3)	Caen
2004–05	Nancy (4)	Le Mans
2005–06	Valenciennes (2)	Sedan
2006–07	Metz (2)	Caen
2007–08	Le Havre **(5)**	Nantes
2008–09	Lens (4)	Montpellier
2009–10	Caen (2)	Brest
2010–11	Evian (1)	Ajaccio
2011–12	Bastia (2)	Reims
2012–13	Monaco (1)	Guingamp
2013–14	Metz (3)	Lens
2014–15	Troyes (1)	Gazélec Ajaccio
2015–16	Nancy **(5)**	Dijon
2016–17	Strasbourg (3)	Amiens
2017–18	Reims (2)	Nîmes
2018–19	Metz (4)	Brest
2019–20	Lorient (1)	Lens
2020–21	Troyes (2)	Clermont
2021–22	Toulouse (3)	Ajaccio
2022–23	Le Havre **(6)**	Metz
2023–24	Auxerre (2)	Angers
2024–25	Lorient (2)	Paris FC
2025–26	Troyes (3)	Le Mans

Notes:

- In **Bold** are the teams who won the Championship play–offs.
- †In 1948–49, 1. FC Saarbrücken won the division under the name FC Sarrebruck, but as a German team, their points were ignored in the final standings.

== Performances ==
=== Performances by club ===
Club	Winners	Runners-up	Winning years	Runner-up years
Le Havre	6	1	1937–38, 1958–59, 1984–85, 1990–91, 2007–08, 2022–23	1949–50
**Nancy**	5	1	1974–75, 1989–90, 1997–98, 2004–05, 2015–16	1969–70
**Metz**	4	4	1934–35, 2006–07, 2013–14, 2018–19	1950–51, 1960–61, 1966–67, 2022–23
Lens	4	2	1936–37, 1948–49, 1972–73, 2008–09	2013–14, 2019–20
Nice	4	1	1947–48, 1964–65, 1969–70, 1993–94	1984–85
Lille	4	1	1963–64, 1973–74, 1977–78, 1999–2000	1970–71
**Montpellier**	3	3	1945–46, 1960–61, 1986–87	1951–52, 1980–81, 2008–09
**Saint-Étienne**	3	3	1962–63, 1998–99, 2003–04	1933–34, 1937–38, 1985–86
Strasbourg	3	2	1976–77, 1987–88, 2016–17	1971–72, 2001–02
Troyes	3	2	2014–15, 2020–21, 2025–26	1953–54, 1972–73
Toulouse	3	1	1981–82, 2002–03, 2021–22	1996–97
Lyon	3	–	1950–51, 1953–54, 1988–89	
Rennes	2	5	1955–56, 1982–83	1938–39, 1957–58, 1975–76, 1989–90, 1993–94
Valenciennes	2	5	1971–72, 2005–06	1934–35, 1936–37, 1961–62, 1974–75, 1991–92
Angers	2	4	1968–69, 1975–76	1955–56, 1977–78, 1992–93, 2023–24
**Red Star**	2	3	1933–34, 1938–39	1954–55, 1964–65, 1973–74
Sochaux	2	2	1946–47, 2000–01	1963–64, 1987–88
Ajaccio	2	2	1966–67, 2001–02	2010–11, 2021–22
Caen	2	2	1995–96, 2009–10	2003–04, 2006–07
Lorient	2	2	2019–20, 2024–25	1997–98, 2000–01
Alès	2	1	1933–34, 1956–57	1946–47
FC Nancy	2	1	1945–46, 1957–58	1959–60
**Reims**	2	1	1965–66, 2017–18	2011–12
**Grenoble**	2	–	1959–60, 1961–62	
Bastia	2	–	1967–68, 2011–12	
Auxerre	2	–	1979–80, 2023–24	
Nîmes	1	3	1949–50	1967–68, 1990–91, 2017–18
Sedan	1	3	1954–55	1971–72, 1998–99, 2005–06
Brest	1	3	1980–81	1978–79, 2009–10, 2018–19
Marseille	1	3	1994–95	1965–66, 1983–84, 1995–96
Monaco	1	3	2012–13	1952–53, 1970–71, 1976–77
Rouen	1	2	1935–36	1933–34, 1981–82
Stade Français	1	2	1951–52	1945–46, 1958–59
Toulouse (1937)	1	1	1952–53	1945–46
Tours	1	1	1983–84	1979–80
Bordeaux	1	1	1991–92	1948–49
Paris Saint-Germain	1	–	1970–71	
Gueugnon	1	–	1978–79	
RCF Paris	1	–	1985–86	
Martigues	1	–	1992–93	
Châteauroux	1	–	1996–97	
Evian	1	–	2010–11	
**Guingamp**	–	3		1994–95, 1999–2000, 2012–13
Le Mans	–	3		2002–03, 2004–05, 2025–26
**Nantes**	–	2		1962–63, 2007–08
RC Roubaix	–	1		1935–36
Colmar	–	1		1947–48
Béziers	–	1		1956–57
Angoulême	–	1		1968–69
Toulon	–	1		1982–83
Niort	–	1		1986–87
Mulhouse	–	1		1988–89
Gazélec Ajaccio	–	1		2014–15
Dijon	–	1		2015–16
Amiens	–	1		2016–17
**Clermont**	–	1		2020–21
Paris FC	–	1		2024–25

Notes:

- **Bold** indicates clubs currently playing in Ligue 2.
- AS Béziers (2007) is the successor to AS Béziers Hérault.
- AS Nancy Lorraine is not the successor to FC Nancy.
- Toulouse FC is not the successor to Toulouse FC (1937).
