= List of Stade Malherbe Caen seasons =

Season's results of Stade Malherbe Caen

Stade Malherbe Caen is a French professional football club based in Caen in Normandy and founded in 1913. The club's first team play in the second tier of French football, Ligue 2. Much of Caen's history was as an amateur club but the club adopted professional status in 1985 after promotion to Division 2. The club reached the top division of French football for the first time in 1988 and has stayed between the top two divisions since. The club most recently spent five consecutive seasons in Ligue 1 before relegation in 2019.

== Recent seasons ==
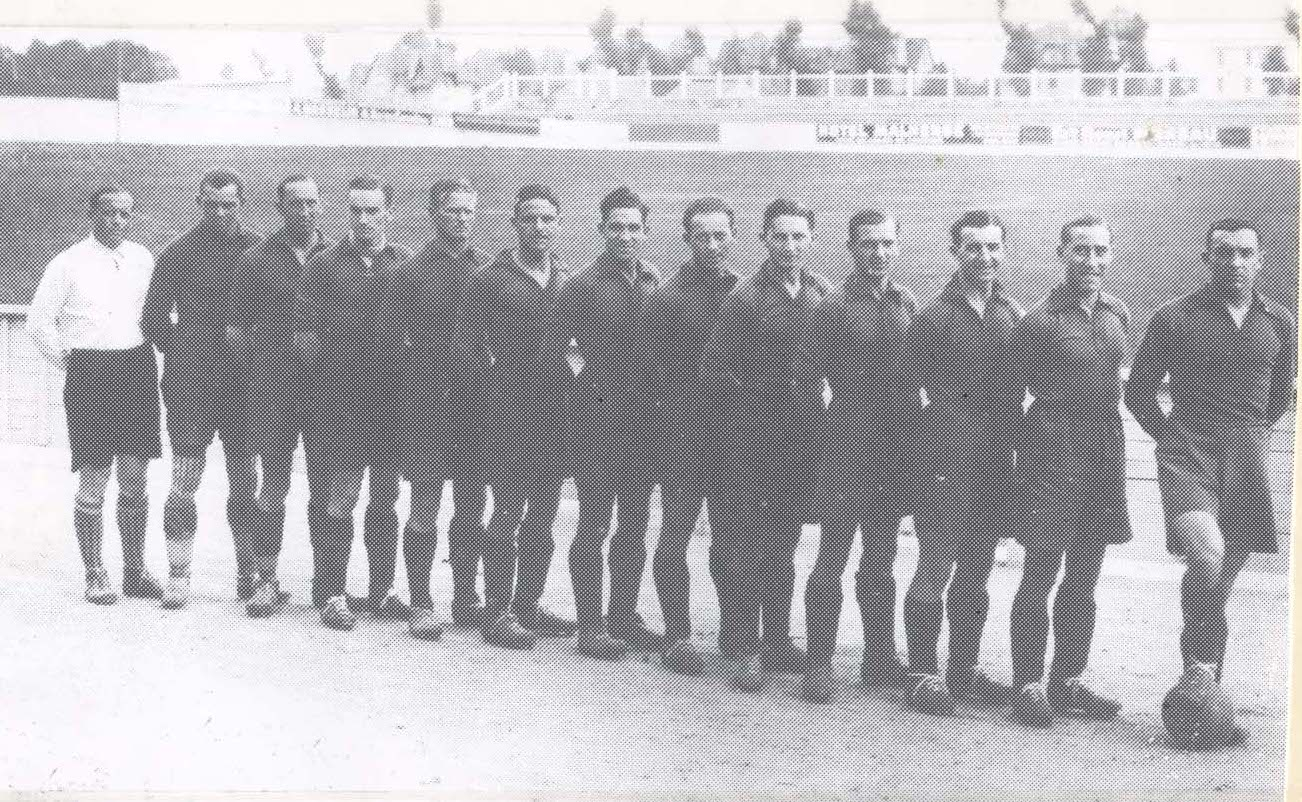
First professional team of Stade Malherbe, 1934–35 season

- 2014–15
- 2015–16
- 2016–17
- 2017–18
- 2018–19
- 2019–20
- 2020–21
- 2021–22
- 2022–23
- 2023–24

== Domestic results ==
Year	Division	Pos	Pld	W	D	L	GF	GA	GD	Pts
1934–35	Division 2	11th	26	9	3	14	61	57	+4	21
1935–36	Division 2	6th	34	17	5	12	68	57	+11	39
1936–37	Division 2	8th	32	12	7	13	44	53	−9	31
1937–38	Division 2	14th	30	N/A	N/A	N/A	N/A	N/A	N/A	23
1970–71	Division 2 – B	15th	30	8	6	16	29	46	−17	22
1971–72	Division 2 – A	6th	30	12	9	9	32	36	−4	33
1972–73	Division 2 – A	17th	34	8	7	19	37	65	−28	23
1975–76	Division 2 – A	6th	34	16	8	10	54	48	+6	43
1976–77	Division 2 – B	15th	34	11	8	15	43	51	−8	30
1977–78	Division 2 – B	18th	34	6	8	20	29	66	−37	20
1980–81	Division 2 – B	18th	34	6	10	18	25	58	−33	22
1984–85	Division 2 – A	11th	34	11	11	12	33	40	−7	33
1985–86	Division 2 – B	6th	34	14	9	11	33	31	+2	37
1986–87	Division 2 – A	2nd	34	21	6	7	62	30	+32	48
1987–88	Division 2 – B	2nd	34	20	9	5	54	22	+32	49
1988–89	Division 1	16th	38	10	10	18	39	60	−21	40
1989–90	Division 1	16th	38	12	10	16	34	48	−14	34
1990–91	Division 1	8th	38	13	12	13	38	36	+2	38
1991–92	Division 1	5th	38	17	10	11	46	45	+1	44
1992–93	Division 1	11th	38	13	9	16	55	54	+1	35
1993–94	Division 1	16th	38	12	7	19	29	54	−25	31
1994–95	Division 1	19th	38	10	6	22	38	58	−20	36
1995–96	Division 2	1st	42	24	9	9	59	34	+25	81
1996–97	Division 1	17th	38	7	16	15	35	46	−11	37
1997–98	Division 2	9th	42	15	11	16	61	55	+6	56
1998–99	Division 2	5th	38	16	11	11	47	39	+8	59
1999–2000	Division 2	6th	38	12	17	9	50	37	+13	53
2000–01	Division 2	17th	38	11	10	17	38	53	−15	43
2001–02	Division 2	6th	38	16	10	12	59	55	+4	58
2002–03	Ligue 2	7th	38	12	16	10	45	40	+5	52
2003–04	Ligue 2	2nd	38	20	11	7	56	31	+25	71
2004–05	Ligue 1	18th	38	10	12	16	36	60	−24	42
2005–06	Ligue 2	4th	38	18	12	8	56	35	+21	66
2006–07	Ligue 2	2nd	38	19	14	5	65	40	+25	71
2007–08	Ligue 1	11th	38	13	12	13	48	53	−5	51
2008–09	Ligue 1	18th	38	8	13	17	42	49	−7	37
2009–10	Ligue 2	1st	38	18	15	5	52	30	+22	69
2010–11	Ligue 1	15th	38	11	13	14	46	51	−5	46
2011–12	Ligue 1	18th	38	9	11	18	39	59	−20	38
2012–13	Ligue 2	4th	38	17	12	9	48	28	+20	63
2013–14	Ligue 2	3rd	38	18	10	10	65	44	+21	64
2014–15	Ligue 1	13th	38	12	10	16	54	55	−1	46
2015–16	Ligue 1	7th	38	16	6	16	39	52	−13	54
2016–17	Ligue 1	17th	38	10	7	21	36	65	−29	37
2017–18	Ligue 1	16th	38	10	8	20	27	52	−25	38
2018–19	Ligue 1	19th	38	7	12	19	29	54	−25	33
2019–20	Ligue 2	13th	28	8	10	10	33	34	−1	34
2020–21	Ligue 2	17th	38	9	14	15	34	49	−15	41
2021–22	Ligue 2	7th	38	13	11	14	51	42	+9	50
2022–23	Ligue 2	5th	38	16	11	11	52	43	+9	59
2023–24	Ligue 2	6th	38	17	7	14	51	45	+6	58
2024–25	Ligue 2	20th	34	5	7	22	31	58	−27	22

Champions	Runners-up	Promoted	Relegated

- Pld = Matches played
- W = Matches won
- D = Matches drawn
- L = Matches lost
- GF = Goals for
- GA = Goals against
- GD = Goal difference
- Pts = Points
- Pos = Final position
- Ligue 1/Division 1 = Ligue 1/French Division 1
- Ligue 2/Division 2 = Ligue 2/French Division 2
