= 1947–48 French Division 2 =

9th season of the second-tier football league in France

Division 2
- Season: 1947–48
- Champions: Nice
- Promoted: Colmar
- Relegated: Angoulême; Avignon
- Matches played: 380

Statistics of Division 2 in the 1947–48 season.

== Overview ==
It was contested by 20 teams, and Nice won the championship.

== Teams ==
A total of twenty teams contested the league, including sixteen sides from the 1946–47 season and four sides relegated from the 1946–47 French Division 1. The league was contested in a double round robin format, with each club playing every other club twice, for a total of 38 rounds. Two points were awarded for wins and one point for draws.

Club	Location	Region	Position in 1946–47
Amiens	Amiens	Picardie	13th
Angers	Angers	Pays de la Loire	3rd
Angoulême	Angoulême	Poitou-Charentes	6th
Avignon	Avignon	Provence-Alpes-Côte d'Azur	10th
Besançon	Besançon	Franche-Comté	14th
Béziers	Béziers	Languedoc-Roussillon	15th
Bordeaux	Bordeaux	Aquitaine	18th in Division 1
Colmar	Colmar	Alsace	7th
Douai	Douai	Nord-Pas-de-Calais	11th
Le Havre	Le Havre	Haute-Normandie	19th in Division 1
Le Mans	Le Mans	Pays de la Loire	19th
Lens	Lens	Nord-Pas-de-Calais	17th in Division 1
Lyon	Lyon	Rhône-Alpes	5th
Nantes	Nantes	Pays de la Loire	8th
Nice	Nice	Provence-Alpes-Côte d'Azur	18th
Nîmes	Nîmes	Languedoc-Roussillon	9th
CA Paris	Paris	Île-de-France	12th
Rouen	Rouen	Haute-Normandie	20th in Division 1
Troyes	Troyes	Champagne-Ardenne	16th
Valenciennes	Valenciennes	Nord-Pas-de-Calais	4th

== League table ==
Pos	Team	Pld	W	D	L	GF	GA	GD	Pts	Qualification or relegation
1	Nice (P)	38	26	6	6	109	36	+73	58	Qualification for 1948–49 French Division 1
2	Colmar (P)	38	23	6	9	83	43	+40	52	Qualification for 1948–49 French Division 1
3	Le Havre	38	22	6	10	77	40	+37	50	
4	Rouen	38	19	11	8	69	42	+27	49	
5	Bordeaux	38	18	9	11	77	47	+30	45	
6	Lyon	38	19	5	14	71	59	+12	43	
7	Angers	38	19	5	14	70	64	+6	43	
8	Lens	38	15	11	12	71	52	+19	41	
9	Amiens	38	18	5	15	70	72	−2	41	
10	Valenciennes	38	16	8	14	76	63	+13	40	
11	Nantes	38	16	6	16	79	81	−2	38	
12	Besançon	38	15	7	16	69	72	−3	37	
13	Nîmes	38	13	9	16	68	67	+1	35	
14	Douai	38	13	7	18	56	84	−28	33	
15	Angoulême (R)	38	11	7	20	58	106	−48	29	Relegation to Championnat Amateur
16	Béziers	38	9	10	19	52	79	−27	28	
17	Troyes	38	9	9	20	56	101	−45	27	
18	Le Mans	38	8	9	21	50	74	−24	25	
19	CA Paris	38	10	4	24	60	77	−17	24	
20	Avignon (R)	38	9	4	25	42	101	−59	22	Relegation to Championnat Amateur

Source: rsssf.com
Rules for classification: 1) points; 2) goal difference; 3) number of goals scored.
(P) Promoted; (R) Relegated
