= 1945–46 French Division 2 =

7th season of the second-tier football league in France

Division 2
- Season: 1945–46

Statistics of Division 2 in the 1945–46 season.

== Overview ==
It was contested by 28 teams, and Nancy and Montpellier won the championship.

== League tables ==
=== Group North ===
Pos	Team	Pld	W	D	L	GF	GA	GD	Pts	Promotion or relegation
1	Nancy	26	22	2	2	84	28	+56	46	Promoted
2	Stade Français	26	18	4	4	64	31	+33	40	Promoted
3	Angers	26	15	3	8	47	42	+5	33	
4	Angoulême	26	12	4	10	45	37	+8	28	
5	Nantes	26	11	4	11	47	43	+4	26	
6	Colmar	26	10	6	10	51	51	0	26	
7	Valenciennes	26	10	5	11	47	44	+3	25	
8	CA Paris	26	11	2	13	48	52	−4	24	
9	Besançon	26	10	3	13	47	52	−5	23	
10	Amiens	26	8	4	14	40	49	−9	20	
11	Le Mans	26	7	5	14	35	47	−12	19	
12	Douai	26	7	5	14	39	64	−25	19	
13	AS Troyes	26	6	7	13	35	61	−26	19	
14	Mulhouse	26	6	4	16	39	67	−28	16	Relegated

Source: rsssf.com

=== Group South ===
Pos	Team	Pld	W	D	L	GF	GA	GD	Pts	Promotion or relegation
1	Montpellier	26	20	2	4	64	21	+43	42	Promoted
2	Toulouse	26	19	4	3	88	32	+56	42	Promoted
3	Olympique Alès	26	14	7	5	60	35	+25	35	
4	Nîmes Olympique	26	17	0	9	69	46	+23	34	
5	Nice	26	12	5	9	46	36	+10	29	
6	Stade Clermont	26	11	6	9	52	45	+7	28	
7	Avignon	26	11	5	10	62	45	+17	27	
8	Grenoble	26	11	5	10	52	53	−1	27	
9	Antibes	26	9	6	11	36	51	−15	24	
10	Toulon	26	10	2	14	52	50	+2	22	
11	Perpignan	26	10	2	14	38	61	−23	22	
12	Vichy	26	8	3	15	56	76	−20	19	
13	Béziers Hérault	26	2	4	20	18	92	−74	8	
14	Brive	26	0	5	21	27	77	−50	5	Relegated

Source: rsssf.com
