= 1959–60 French Division 2 =

21st season of the second-tier football league in France

Division 2
- Season: 1959–60

Statistics of Division 2 in the 1959–60 season.

== Overview ==
It was contested by 20 teams, and Grenoble won the championship.

== League standings ==
| Pos | Team | Pld | W | D | L | GF | GA | GD | Pts | Promotion or relegation |
|---|---|---|---|---|---|---|---|---|---|---|
| 1 | Grenoble | 38 | 22 | 7 | 9 | 55 | 33 | +22 | 51 | Promoted |
| 2 | Nancy | 38 | 19 | 12 | 7 | 61 | 39 | +22 | 50 | Promoted |
| 3 | Rouen | 38 | 21 | 5 | 12 | 77 | 45 | +32 | 47 | Promoted |
| 4 | AS Troyes | 38 | 21 | 5 | 12 | 65 | 54 | +11 | 47 | Promoted |
| 5 | Red Star Paris | 38 | 21 | 4 | 13 | 69 | 45 | +24 | 46 | |
| 6 | FC Metz | 38 | 18 | 9 | 11 | 58 | 42 | +16 | 45 | |
| 7 | Montpellier | 38 | 18 | 8 | 12 | 57 | 48 | +9 | 44 | |
| 8 | Nantes | 38 | 16 | 9 | 13 | 58 | 48 | +10 | 41 | |
| 9 | Olympique Alès | 38 | 13 | 14 | 11 | 48 | 42 | +6 | 40 | |
| 10 | Olympique Marseille | 38 | 16 | 5 | 17 | 57 | 63 | −6 | 37 | |
| 11 | Lille | 38 | 12 | 12 | 14 | 62 | 62 | 0 | 36 | |
| 12 | Béziers | 38 | 12 | 12 | 14 | 51 | 59 | −8 | 36 | |
| 13 | Besançon | 38 | 14 | 7 | 17 | 50 | 44 | +6 | 35 | |
| 14 | Sète | 38 | 13 | 9 | 16 | 43 | 52 | −9 | 35 | |
| 15 | Forbach | 38 | 10 | 13 | 15 | 52 | 57 | −5 | 33 | |
| 16 | CA Paris | 38 | 14 | 3 | 21 | 61 | 68 | −7 | 31 | |
| 17 | Cannes | 38 | 11 | 9 | 18 | 45 | 74 | −29 | 31 | |
| 18 | Roubaix-Tourcoing | 38 | 7 | 14 | 17 | 48 | 65 | −17 | 28 | |
| 19 | US Boulogne | 38 | 8 | 11 | 19 | 42 | 73 | −31 | 27 | |
| 20 | Aix-en-Provence | 38 | 6 | 8 | 24 | 33 | 79 | −46 | 20 | |

Source: rsssf.com
