= 1933–34 French Division 2 =

1st season of the second-tier football league in France

Division 2
- Season: 1933–34
- Champions: Red Star Paris (North); Olympique Alès (South)
- Promoted: Red Star Paris; Mulhouse; Strasbourg; Olympique Alès
- Relegated: Suisse (North); AS Monaco (South); Hyères (South); Béziers (South)
- Top goalscorer: Jean Nicolas (54)

Statistics of Division 2 in the 1933–34 season.

== Overview ==
It was contested by 23 teams, and Red Star Paris and Olympique Alès won the championship.

== League tables ==
=== Group North ===
Pos	Team	Pld	W	D	L	GF	GA	GD	Pts	Promotion or relegation
1	Red Star Paris	24	15	5	4	71	37	+34	35	Promoted
2	Rouen	24	15	5	4	85	46	+39	35	
3	Mulhouse	24	14	3	7	58	39	+19	31	Promoted
4	Strasbourg	24	13	4	7	64	42	+22	30	Promoted
5	Metz	24	11	4	9	51	39	+12	26	
6	Roubaix	24	10	3	11	41	47	−6	23	
7	Valenciennes	24	7	8	9	47	52	−5	22	
8	Amiens	24	9	4	11	59	65	−6	22	
9	Tourcoing	24	8	4	12	38	51	−13	20	
10	Le Havre	24	8	3	13	48	61	−13	19	
11	Saint-Servan	24	7	4	13	39	67	−28	18	
12	Club Français Paris	24	5	7	12	43	73	−30	17	
13	Calais	24	5	5	14	31	56	−25	15	
14	Suisse	0	0	0	0	0	0	0	0	Relegated

Source: rsssf.com

=== Group South ===
Pos	Team	Pld	W	D	L	GF	GA	GD	Pts	Promotion or relegation
1	Olympique Alès	14	10	1	3	38	19	+19	21	Promoted
2	Saint-Étienne	14	9	1	4	25	16	+9	19	
3	AS Monaco	14	7	3	4	40	31	+9	17	Relegated
4	Deportivo Espagnol	14	7	1	6	38	38	0	15	Merge
5	Hyères	14	6	1	7	15	21	−6	13	Relegated
6	Béziers	14	4	3	7	31	39	−8	11	Relegated
7	Bastidienne Bordeaux	14	4	1	9	21	29	−8	9	Merge
8	Lyon	14	2	3	9	21	36	−15	7	Relegated
9	Nice	0	0	0	0	0	0	0	0	Relegated

Source: rsssf.com
