= 1983–84 French Division 2 =

45th season of the second-tier football league in France

Division 2
- Season: 1983–84

Statistics of Division 2 in the 1983/1984 season.

== Overview ==
It was contested by 37 teams, and Olympique Marseille and Tours won the championship.

== League tables ==
=== Group A ===
Pos	Team	Pld	W	D	L	GF	GA	GD	Pts	Promotion or relegation
1	Olympique Marseille	36	22	12	2	92	32	+60	56	Promoted
2	Nice	36	23	7	6	72	28	+44	53	
3	Olympique Lyonnais	36	17	13	6	55	26	+29	47	
4	Limoges	36	17	11	8	55	37	+18	45	
5	Montpellier	36	16	11	9	57	43	+14	43	
6	Cannes	36	14	12	10	53	48	+5	40	
7	Grenoble	36	14	9	13	45	52	−7	37	
8	Olympique Alès	36	10	16	10	37	40	−3	36	
9	Thonon	36	11	11	14	39	51	−12	33	
10	Martigues	36	11	10	15	49	59	−10	32	
11	Sète	36	11	10	15	41	56	−15	32	
12	Cuiseaux Louhans	36	9	13	14	37	50	−13	31	
13	Gueugnon	36	9	12	15	33	38	−5	30	
14	Besançon	36	8	14	14	48	57	−9	30	
15	Béziers	36	10	10	16	35	53	−18	30	
16	Libourne	36	9	11	16	32	48	−16	29	Relegated
17	La Roche sur Yon	36	11	6	19	37	60	−23	28	Relegated
18	Angoulême	36	9	9	18	33	47	−14	27	Relegated
19	Villefranche	36	8	9	19	44	69	−25	25	Relegated

Source: rsssf.com

=== Group B ===
Pos	Team	Pld	W	D	L	GF	GA	GD	Pts	Promotion or relegation
1	Tours	34	24	5	5	80	30	+50	53	Promoted
2	Racing Paris	34	24	4	6	91	26	+65	52	Promoted
3	Le Havre	34	18	11	5	57	29	+28	47	
4	Stade Reims	34	20	5	9	68	40	+28	45	
5	Valenciennes	34	17	7	10	45	39	+6	41	
6	Orléans	34	14	11	9	39	32	+7	39	
7	Mulhouse	34	15	8	11	60	42	+18	38	
8	En Avant Guingamp	34	14	10	10	52	45	+7	38	
9	Stade Français	34	10	13	11	36	37	−1	33	
10	Berrichonne Chateauroux	34	12	7	15	41	64	−23	31	
11	CS Sedan Ardennes	34	11	8	15	29	42	−13	30	
12	Abbeville	34	8	12	14	33	46	−13	28	
13	Dunkerque	34	9	9	16	22	51	−29	27	
14	Angers	34	9	8	17	33	49	−16	26	
15	Stade Quimpérois	34	7	12	15	28	48	−20	26	
16	Red Star Paris	34	9	8	17	30	52	−22	26	
17	Montceau-les-Mines	34	3	11	20	22	51	−29	17	Relegated
18	FC Roubaix	34	3	9	22	20	63	−43	15	Relegated

Source: rsssf.com

== Championship play-offs ==
Team 1	Agg.	Team 2	1st leg	2nd leg
Marseille	3–4	Tours	1–1	2–3

== Promotion play-offs ==
Quarter-final
2A	Nice (a.e.t.)	4
3B	Le Havre	3
2B	Racing Paris (a.e.t.)	3
3A	Lyon	1

Semi-final
2A	Nice	2	1	3
2B	Racing Paris	0	5	5

Final
2B	Racing Paris	2	0	2
18	Saint-Étienne	0	0	0

== Top goalscorers ==
Rank	Player	Club (Grp)	Goals
1	(France) Mario Relmy	Limoges (A)	23
1	(Senegal) Boubacar Sarr	Marseille (A)	23
3	(France) Marc Pascal	Marseille (A)	22
3	(Argentina) Omar da Fonseca	Tours (B)	22
5	(Algeria) Rabah Madjer	Racing Paris (B)	20
6	(Socialist Federal Republic of Yugoslavia) Žarko Olarević	Marseille (A)	19
7	(Socialist Federal Republic of Yugoslavia) Simo Nikolić	Lyon (A)	18
7	(France) Philippe Tibeuf	Guingamp (B)	18
9	(Cameroon) Eugène Ekéké	Racing Paris (B)	17
9	(France) Patrice Ségura	Sète (A)	17
