= 1974–75 French Division 2 =

36th season of the second-tier football league in France

Division 2
- Season: 1974–75

Statistics of Division 2 in the 1974–75 season.

== Overview ==
It was contested by 35 teams, and Valenciennes and Nancy won the championship.

== League tables ==
=== Group A ===
Pos	Team	Pld	W	D	L	GF	GA	GD	BP	Pts	Promotion or relegation
1	Valenciennes	34	19	9	6	59	27	+32	6	53	Promoted
2	Rouen	34	19	10	5	59	34	+25	4	52	
3	Lorient	34	18	8	8	50	31	+19	2	46	
4	CS Sedan Ardennes	34	18	8	8	57	40	+17	2	46	
5	Gueugnon	34	13	13	8	46	31	+15	4	43	
6	Dunkerque	34	17	8	9	46	40	+6	0	42	
7	Angoulême	34	13	9	12	56	50	+6	5	40	
8	Amiens	34	15	6	13	42	41	+1	3	39	
9	US Boulogne	34	13	8	13	40	33	+7	3	37	
10	Auxerre	34	14	8	12	36	31	+5	1	37	
11	Stade Lavallois	34	14	5	15	50	46	+4	3	36	
12	Entente BFN	34	11	9	14	43	53	−10	3	34	
13	Stade Brest	34	10	10	14	50	52	−2	3	33	
14	Hazebrouck	34	8	12	14	30	49	−19	2	30	
15	Paris FC	34	11	8	15	31	54	−23	0	30	
16	Cambrai	34	6	11	17	35	50	−15	2	25	Relegated
17	Stade Quimpérois	34	6	9	19	40	69	−29	2	23	Relegated
18	CA Mantes la Ville	34	4	9	21	31	70	−39	0	17	Relegated

Source: rsssf.com
Rules for classification: 2 points for a win with an extra point for winning by a 2 goal difference

=== Group B ===
Pos	Team	Pld	W	D	L	GF	GA	GD	BP	Pts	Promotion or relegation
1	Nancy	32	17	8	7	73	34	+39	10	52	Promoted
2	Avignon	32	16	9	7	57	31	+26	5	46	Promoted
3	Toulon	32	18	8	6	44	22	+22	2	46	
4	Cannes	32	16	7	9	56	37	+19	5	44	
5	Montluçon	32	14	12	6	40	35	+5	1	41	
6	Toulouse	32	13	10	9	49	48	+1	3	39	
7	Martigues	32	13	9	10	47	44	+3	2	37	
8	Sète	32	9	11	12	38	27	+11	3	32	
9	Besançon	32	11	7	14	48	52	−4	3	32	
10	Berrichonne Chateauroux	32	11	8	13	41	44	−3	1	31	
11	Tours	32	10	9	13	41	50	−9	2	31	
12	Chaumont	32	10	9	13	38	47	−9	2	31	
13	Béziers	32	10	7	15	49	60	−11	3	30	
14	Mulhouse	32	8	10	14	46	57	−11	3	29	
15	Épinal	32	8	12	12	32	52	−20	0	28	
16	Bourges	32	7	11	14	26	37	−11	2	27	Relegated
17	Blois	32	4	7	21	28	66	−38	1	16	Relegated

Source: rsssf.com
Rules for classification: 2 points for a win with an extra point for winning by a 2 goal difference

== Championship play-offs ==
Team 1	Agg.	Team 2	1st leg	2nd leg
Valenciennes	0–4	Nancy	0–0	0–4

== Promotion play-offs ==
Team 1	Agg.	Team 2	1st leg	2nd leg
Avignon	3–2	Rouen	3–0	0–2
