= 1965–66 French Division 2 =

27th season of the second-tier football league in France

Division 2
- Season: 1965–66

Statistics of Division 2 in the 1965–66 season.

== Overview ==
It was contested by 19 teams, and Stade Reims won the championship.

== League standings ==
Pos	Team	Pld	W	D	L	GF	GA	GD	Pts	Promotion or relegation
1	Stade Reims	36	22	6	8	76	38	+38	50	Promoted
2	Olympique Marseille	36	20	8	8	58	31	+27	48	Promoted
3	Limoges	36	18	10	8	50	27	+23	46	
4	Bastia	36	18	9	9	60	46	+14	45	
5	Toulon	36	17	10	9	56	38	+18	44	
6	Avignon	36	17	9	10	68	42	+26	43	
7	Béziers	36	19	5	12	59	42	+17	43	
8	FC Metz	36	15	12	9	54	50	+4	42	
9	US Boulogne	36	15	10	11	60	56	+4	40	
10	Grenoble	36	16	7	13	62	58	+4	39	
11	Cherbourg	36	12	11	13	39	50	−11	35	
12	Angoulême	36	11	10	15	48	52	−4	32	
13	Montpellier	36	12	6	18	46	60	−14	30	
14	Besançon	36	9	11	16	47	72	−25	29	
15	Ajaccio	36	8	11	17	45	65	−20	27	
16	Forbach	36	8	9	19	43	67	−24	25	
17	RC Paris	36	9	6	21	46	70	−24	24	Merge
18	Aix-en-Provence	36	6	11	19	39	62	−23	23	
19	Marignane	36	7	5	24	32	73	−41	19	

Source: rsssf.com
