= 1946–47 French Division 2 =

8th season of the second-tier football league in France

Division 2
- Season: 1946–47

Statistics of Division 2 in the 1946–47 season.

== Overview ==
It was contested by 22 teams, and Sochaux-Montbéliard won the championship.

== League standings ==
Pos	Team	Pld	W	D	L	GF	GA	GD	Pts	Promotion or relegation
1	Sochaux-Montbéliard	42	25	13	4	141	61	+80	63	Promoted
2	Olympique Alès	42	26	6	10	110	68	+42	58	Promoted
3	Angers	42	24	8	10	98	55	+43	56	
4	Valenciennes	42	22	11	9	68	47	+21	55	
5	Lyon OU	42	23	7	12	81	48	+33	53	
6	Angoulême	41	18	13	10	88	61	+27	49	
7	Colmar	42	19	11	12	80	75	+5	49	
8	Nantes	42	16	13	13	66	70	−4	45	
9	Nîmes Olympique	42	15	12	15	69	68	+1	42	
10	Avignon	42	18	6	18	75	81	−6	42	
11	Douai	42	13	15	14	62	60	+2	41	
12	CA Paris	42	15	11	16	75	74	+1	41	
13	Amiens	32	15	8	9	63	77	−14	38	
14	Besançon	42	15	7	20	54	58	−4	37	
15	Béziers Hérault	42	12	13	17	57	62	−5	37	
16	AS Troyes	42	11	15	16	59	68	−9	37	
17	Stade Clermont	42	12	13	17	69	81	−12	37	
18	Nice	42	14	8	20	56	73	−17	36	
19	Le Mans	42	13	7	22	66	95	−29	33	
20	Toulon	42	12	8	22	69	64	+5	32	Relegated
21	Perpignan	42	8	6	28	57	130	−73	22	Relegated
22	Antibes	42	7	5	30	42	120	−78	19	Relegated

Source: rsssf.com
