= 1982–83 French Division 2 =

44th season of the second-tier football league in France

Division 2
- Season: 1982–83

Statistics of Division 2 in the 1982/1983 season.

== Overview ==
It was contested by 36 teams, and Stade Rennais and Toulon won the championship.

== League tables ==
=== Group A ===
Pos	Team	Pld	W	D	L	GF	GA	GD	Pts	Promotion or relegation
1	Stade Rennais	34	23	8	3	68	25	+43	54	Promoted
2	Nîmes Olympique	34	19	11	4	65	34	+31	49	Promoted
3	Valenciennes	34	18	11	5	74	39	+35	47	
4	Racing Paris	34	17	9	8	60	28	+32	43	
5	Le Havre	34	15	11	8	54	39	+15	41	
6	Angoulême	34	13	12	9	39	30	+9	38	
7	Montpellier	34	14	9	11	43	34	+9	37	
8	En Avant Guingamp	34	11	13	10	47	42	+5	35	
9	Abbeville	34	15	5	14	35	39	−4	35	
10	Nœux-les-Mines	34	9	13	12	29	39	−10	31	Relegated
11	Béziers	34	9	11	14	33	43	−10	29	
12	Angers	34	10	9	15	50	65	−15	29	
13	Berrichonne Chateauroux	34	9	11	14	38	55	−17	29	
14	Libourne	34	5	18	11	28	39	−11	28	
15	Limoges	34	10	8	16	30	51	−21	28	
16	Olympique Alès	34	8	10	16	34	44	−10	26	
17	Entente Viry Châtillon	34	5	9	20	21	58	−37	19	Relegated
18	Corbeil-Essonnes	34	3	8	23	25	69	−44	14	Relegated

Source: rsssf.com

=== Group B ===
Pos	Team	Pld	W	D	L	GF	GA	GD	Pts	Promotion or relegation
1	Toulon	34	21	10	3	68	17	+51	52	Promoted
2	Stade Reims	34	24	4	6	70	33	+37	52	
3	Nice	34	18	12	4	55	26	+29	48	
4	Olympique Marseille	34	16	9	9	38	24	+14	41	
5	Dunkerque	34	15	10	9	49	39	+10	40	
6	Martigues	34	17	5	12	53	44	+9	39	
7	Cannes	34	13	12	9	43	37	+6	38	
8	Orléans	34	10	14	10	32	35	−3	34	
9	Grenoble	34	11	12	11	42	46	−4	34	
10	Red Star Paris	34	11	11	12	38	48	−10	33	
11	Besançon	34	11	10	13	39	44	−5	32	
12	Gueugnon	34	8	15	11	35	35	0	31	
13	Thonon	34	8	12	14	35	45	−10	28	
14	Cuiseaux Louhans	34	8	10	16	31	47	−16	26	
15	Stade Français	34	8	9	17	32	50	−18	25	
16	Montceau-les-Mines	34	5	12	17	31	55	−24	22	
17	Fontainebleau	34	4	13	17	21	55	−34	21	Relegated
18	Blenod	34	4	8	22	18	50	−32	16	Relegated

Source: rsssf.com

== Championship play-offs ==
Team 1	Agg.	Team 2	1st leg	2nd leg
Toulon	2–3	Rennes	0–1	2–2

== Promotion play-offs ==
Team 1	Agg.	Team 2	1st leg	2nd leg
Nîmes	3–2	Stade de Reims	3–1	0–1

Nîmes was qualified to the play-off against 18th placed team of Division 1, Tours.

== Top goalscorers ==
Rank	Player	Club (Grp)	Goals
1	(Poland) Włodzimierz Lubański	Valenciennes (A)	27
2	(France) Patrick Cubaynes	Nîmes (A)	20
3	(France) Christian Dalger	Toulon (B)	18
4	(Israel) Vicky Peretz	Rennes (A)	17
4	(Socialist Federal Republic of Yugoslavia) Žarko Olarević	Le Havre (A)	17
4	(France) Dominique Lefebvre	Valenciennes (A)	17
4	(France) Farès Bousdira	Rennes (A)	17
8	(France) Jean-Pierre Orts	Stade Français (B)	16
8	(France) Jean-Pierre Bertolino	Reims (B)	16
10	(Mali) Cheikh Diallo	Toulon (B)	14
