= Fouzi Alidra =

French footballer (born 1971)

Personal information
- Date of birth: 6 August 1971 (age 55)
- Place of birth: Annecy, France
- Position: Midfielder

Senior career*
Years	Team	Apps	(Gls)
1990–1992	Nîmes Olympique		
1992–1997	Olympique Alès		
1997–1999	Nîmes Olympique		
- * Club domestic league appearances and goals

Fouzi Alidra (born 6 August 1971) is a French former footballer who played as a midfielder.
