= 1977–78 French Division 2 =

39th season of the second-tier football league in France

Division 2
- Season: 1977–78

Statistics of Division 2 in the 1977/1978 season.

== Overview ==
It was contested by 36 teams, and Angers and Lille won the championship.

== League tables ==
=== Group A ===
Pos	Team	Pld	W	D	L	GF	GA	GD	Pts	Promotion or relegation
1	Angers	34	21	7	6	50	27	+23	49	Promoted
2	Besançon	34	19	8	7	52	26	+26	46	
3	Toulon	34	18	7	9	61	32	+29	43	
4	Auxerre	34	17	7	10	49	36	+13	41	
5	Cannes	34	15	10	9	50	40	+10	40	
6	Épinal	34	13	13	8	42	40	+2	39	
7	Martigues	34	16	5	13	49	37	+12	37	
8	Avignon	34	12	9	13	43	36	+7	33	
9	Gazélec Ajaccio	34	12	9	13	42	55	−13	33	
10	Chaumont	34	10	11	13	51	51	0	31	
11	Saint-Dié	34	12	7	15	30	44	−14	31	
12	Olympique Alès	34	11	8	15	59	55	+4	30	
13	Melun	34	10	10	14	33	39	−6	30	
14	Arles	34	8	14	12	33	41	−8	30	
15	Béziers	34	8	14	12	26	35	−9	30	
16	Toulouse	34	9	12	13	36	53	−17	30	
17	Haguenau	34	7	7	20	23	52	−29	21	Relegated
18	Entente BFN	34	5	8	21	25	55	−30	18	Relegated

Source: rsssf.com

=== Group B ===
Pos	Team	Pld	W	D	L	GF	GA	GD	Pts	Promotion or relegation
1	Lille	34	21	9	4	75	28	+47	51	Promoted
2	Paris FC	34	20	9	5	71	25	+46	49	Promoted
3	Red Star Paris	34	20	7	7	58	33	+25	47	
4	Dunkerque	34	17	9	8	66	34	+32	43	
5	Tours	34	17	7	10	58	44	+14	41	
6	Gueugnon	34	16	8	10	52	39	+13	40	
7	Angoulême	34	12	12	10	46	36	+10	36	
8	Amicale de Lucé	34	11	13	10	26	37	−11	35	
9	Berrichonne Chateauroux	34	10	13	11	37	38	−1	33	
10	Stade Brest	34	11	11	12	41	48	−7	33	
11	US Boulogne	34	9	11	14	37	49	−12	29	
12	Stade Rennais	34	9	10	15	43	56	−13	28	
13	Stade Quimpérois	34	7	14	13	32	45	−13	28	
14	En Avant Guingamp	34	9	10	15	32	57	−25	28	
15	Limoges	34	7	13	14	30	44	−14	27	
16	Poissy	34	6	10	18	23	47	−24	22	Relegated
17	Noeux-les-Mines	34	6	10	18	26	55	−29	22	Relegated
18	Caen	34	6	8	20	29	66	−37	20	Relegated

Source: rsssf.com

== Championship play-offs ==
Team 1	Agg.	Team 2	1st leg	2nd leg
Angers	5–6	Lille	2–1	3–5

== Promotion play-offs ==
Team 1	Agg.	Team 2	1st leg	2nd leg
Paris FC	6–3	Besançon	3–1	3–2
