= 1971–72 French Division 2 =

33rd season of the second-tier football league in France

Division 2
- Season: 1971–72

Statistics of Division 2 in the 1971–72 season.

== Overview ==
It was contested by 48 teams, and CS Sedan Ardennes, Valenciennes and RC Strasbourg won the championship.

== League tables ==
=== Group A ===
Pos	Team	Pld	W	D	L	GF	GA	GD	Pts	Promotion or relegation
1	CS Sedan Ardennes	30	22	4	4	85	21	+64	48	Promoted
2	AS Troyes	30	16	12	2	50	24	+26	44	
3	Lens	30	18	4	8	48	24	+24	40	
4	Rouen	30	11	13	6	44	38	+6	35	
5	US Boulogne	30	11	11	8	35	22	+13	33	
6	Caen	30	12	9	9	32	36	−4	33	
7	Chaumont	30	13	6	11	37	28	+9	32	
8	Mulhouse	30	9	12	9	36	26	+10	30	
9	Dunkerque	30	9	9	12	41	35	+6	27	
10	Besançon	30	11	5	14	37	39	−2	27	
11	Amiens	30	10	6	14	34	56	−22	26	
12	US Quevilly	30	8	9	13	34	49	−15	25	Relegated
13	Cambrai	30	8	9	13	39	59	−20	25	
14	AC Mouzon	30	6	11	13	45	54	−9	23	Relegated
15	Evreux	30	5	9	16	30	49	−19	19	Relegated
16	Creil	30	3	7	20	22	42	−20	13	Relegated

Source: rsssf.com

=== Group B ===
Pos	Team	Pld	W	D	L	GF	GA	GD	Pts	Promotion or relegation
1	Valenciennes	30	19	5	6	48	21	+27	43	Promoted
2	Limoges	30	17	7	6	49	26	+23	41	
3	Stade Brest	30	15	7	8	50	33	+17	37	
4	Le Mans	30	13	7	10	52	35	+17	33	
5	Bourges	30	11	11	8	40	44	−4	33	
6	CA Mantes la Ville	30	12	8	10	42	42	0	32	Relegated
7	Montluçon	30	12	8	10	46	49	−3	32	
8	Stade Lavallois	30	13	6	11	38	46	−8	32	
9	Blois	30	9	10	11	41	40	+1	28	
10	Berrichonne Chateauroux	30	10	8	12	31	32	−1	28	
11	Lorient	30	9	8	13	54	57	−3	26	
12	Stade Poitiers	30	8	10	12	35	39	−4	26	
13	Entente BFN	30	9	6	15	31	44	−13	24	
14	La Rochelle	30	7	9	14	36	48	−12	23	Relegated
15	Paris Joinville	30	6	10	14	27	42	−15	22	Relegated
16	Stade Quimpérois	30	7	6	17	24	46	−22	20	Relegated

Source: rsssf.com

=== Group C ===
Pos	Team	Pld	W	D	L	GF	GA	GD	Pts	Promotion or relegation
1	RC Strasbourg	30	24	4	2	92	19	+73	52	Promoted
2	Avignon	30	13	13	4	51	28	+23	39	
3	Toulon	30	15	6	9	48	30	+18	36	
4	ES La Ciotat	30	12	9	9	30	33	−3	33	
5	Cannes	30	12	9	9	46	26	+20	33	
6	Gueugnon	30	11	9	10	34	40	−6	31	
7	Arles	30	13	5	12	28	36	−8	31	
8	Toulouse	30	11	8	11	37	34	+3	30	
9	Montpellier	30	9	10	11	34	40	−6	28	
10	Montelimar	30	11	5	14	36	42	−6	27	
11	Sète	30	10	7	13	37	45	−8	27	
12	Cuiseaux Louhans	30	8	10	12	37	46	−9	26	
13	Béziers	30	9	8	13	29	54	−25	26	Relegated
14	Aix-en-Provence	30	9	8	13	26	35	−9	26	Relegated
15	Martigues	30	6	8	16	39	53	−14	20	Relegated
16	Gazélec Ajaccio	30	2	11	17	20	59	−39	15	Relegated

Source: rsssf.com

== Championship play-offs ==
Team 1	Score	Team 2
Sedan	0–1	Valenciennes
Valenciennes	2–1	Strasbourg
Strasbourg	not played	Sedan

Pos	Team	Pld	W	D	L	GF	GA	GD	Pts
1	Valenciennes (C)	2	2	0	0	3	1	+2	4
2	Strasbourg	1	0	0	1	1	2	−1	0
3	Sedan	1	0	0	1	0	1	−1	0

Rules for classification: 1) points; 2) goal difference; 3) number of goals scored.
(C) Champions
