= 1984–85 French Division 2 =

46th season of the second-tier football league in France

Division 2
- Season: 1984–85

Statistics of Division 2 in the 1984/1985 season.

== Overview ==
It was contested by 36 teams, and Le Havre and Nice won the championship.

== League tables ==
=== Group A ===
Pos	Team	Pld	W	D	L	GF	GA	GD	Pts	Promotion or relegation
1	Le Havre	34	24	4	6	69	20	+49	52	Promoted
2	Mulhouse	34	22	6	6	62	25	+37	50	
3	Stade Rennais	34	20	6	8	51	21	+30	46	Promoted
4	Orléans	34	15	13	6	34	19	+15	43	
5	En Avant Guingamp	34	17	8	9	47	33	+14	42	
6	Valenciennes	34	15	10	9	46	36	+10	40	
7	Besançon	34	12	12	10	47	36	+11	36	
8	CS Sedan Ardennes	34	12	12	10	36	36	0	36	
9	Stade Quimpérois	34	11	11	12	40	43	−3	33	
10	Red Star Paris	34	12	9	13	32	37	−5	33	
11	Caen	34	11	11	12	33	40	−7	33	
12	Stade Reims	34	10	12	12	31	44	−13	32	
13	Stade Français	34	9	11	14	37	43	−6	29	
14	Dunkerque	34	9	7	18	33	46	−13	25	
15	Abbeville	34	6	13	15	35	56	−21	25	
16	Angers	34	8	6	20	37	60	−23	22	
17	Amiens	34	6	8	20	23	51	−28	20	Relegated
18	Berrichonne Chateauroux	34	3	9	22	25	72	−47	15	Relegated

Source: rsssf.com

=== Group B ===
Pos	Team	Pld	W	D	L	GF	GA	GD	Pts	Promotion or relegation
1	Nice	34	20	10	4	73	29	+44	50	Promoted
2	Saint-Étienne	34	20	8	6	66	22	+44	48	
3	Nîmes Olympique	34	15	12	7	64	37	+27	42	
4	Montpellier	34	15	11	8	59	37	+22	41	
5	Thonon	34	15	8	11	48	39	+9	38	
6	Olympique Alès	34	12	11	11	33	28	+5	35	
7	Olympique Lyonnais	34	13	9	12	41	39	+2	35	
8	Cannes	34	12	10	12	41	41	0	34	
9	Gueugnon	34	11	11	12	39	50	−11	33	
10	Sète	34	12	8	14	48	59	−11	32	
11	Grenoble	34	14	4	16	35	52	−17	32	
12	Martigues	34	10	11	13	42	43	−1	31	
13	Limoges	34	9	13	12	37	48	−11	31	
14	Le Puy	34	12	7	15	34	45	−11	31	
15	Béziers	34	11	8	15	45	56	−11	30	
16	Cuiseaux Louhans	34	10	9	15	39	45	−6	29	Relegated
17	La Roche sur Yon	34	9	11	14	39	60	−21	29	Relegated
18	FC Valence	34	3	5	26	28	81	−53	11	Relegated

Source: rsssf.com

== Championship play-offs ==
Team 1	Agg.	Team 2	1st leg	2nd leg
Nice	2–5	Le Havre	2–2	0–3

== Promotion play-offs ==
Quarter-final
2B	Saint-Étienne	0
3A	Rennes	2
2A	Mulhouse	2
3B	Nîmes	0

Semi-final
3A	Rennes	1	4	5
2A	Mulhouse	0	2	2

Final
3A	Rennes (p)	0	1	1 (7)
18	Rouen	1	0	1 (6)

== Top goalscorers ==
Rank	Player	Club (Grp)	Goals
1	(Argentina) Jorge Dominguez	Nice (B)	28
2	(Denmark) John Eriksen	Mulhouse (A)	27
2	(France) Patrick Cubaynes	Nîmes (B)	27
4	(France) Mario Relmy	Rennes (A)	21
5	(Cameroon) Roger Milla	Saint-Étienne (B)	20
5	(Socialist Federal Republic of Yugoslavia) Milan Ćalasan	Béziers (B)	20
7	(France) Jean-Pierre Orts	Montpellier (B)	18
7	(France) Paco Bandera	Gueugnon (B)	18
7	(France) Pascal Mariini	Besançon (A)	18
10	(France) Jean-Pierre Papin	Valenciennes (A)	15
