= Marc Bourrier =

French footballer (1934–2024)

Personal information
- Date of birth: 21 September 1934
- Place of birth: Ganges, France
- Date of death: 12 August 2024 (aged 89)
- Position: Midfielder

Youth career
- 1956–1957: SA Cigalois

Senior career*
Years	Team	Apps	(Gls)
1957–1963	Montpellier	208	(25)
1963–1966	Lens	103	(2)
1966–1968	Toulon	53	(5)
- Avignon

Managerial career
- 1972–1976: Avignon
- 1976–1988: France (assistant coach)
- 1988–1993: France U21
- 1993–1994: Marseille
- 1996–1997: Sète
- 1998–2000: Alès
- * Club domestic league appearances and goals

Marc Bourrier (21 September 1934 – 12 August 2024) was a French football midfielder who played for Montpellier, Lens, Toulon and Avignon.

Bourrier most notably won the 1988 UEFA European Under-21 Football Championship as coach with the France national under-21 football team. He also coached Avignon, Marseille, Sète and Alès. He died on 12 August 2024, at the age of 89.
