= 1950–51 French Division 2 =

12th season of the second-tier football league in France

Division 2
- Season: 1950–51

Statistics of Division 2 in the 1950–51 season.

== Overview ==
It was contested by 18 teams, and Olympique Lyonnais won the championship.

== League standings ==
Pos	Team	Pld	W	D	L	GF	GA	GD	Pts	Promotion or relegation
1	Olympique Lyonnais	32	23	4	5	75	41	+34	50	Promoted
2	FC Metz	32	20	6	6	74	32	+42	46	Promoted
3	Rouen	32	18	4	10	51	43	+8	40	
4	Besançon	32	17	4	11	66	49	+17	38	
5	AS Monaco	32	13	11	8	56	43	+13	37	
6	Cannes	32	13	9	10	76	47	+29	35	
7	Amiens	32	10	12	10	53	42	+11	32	
8	Montpellier	32	13	6	13	46	40	+6	32	
9	AS Troyes	32	14	3	15	42	54	−12	31	
10	Nantes	32	11	7	14	54	56	−2	29	
11	Toulon	32	11	7	14	52	59	−7	29	
12	Valenciennes	32	10	8	14	41	55	−14	28	
13	Olympique Alès	32	10	8	14	34	56	−22	28	
14	Angers	32	7	9	16	47	67	−20	23	
15	Béziers	32	7	8	17	39	60	−21	22	
16	Le Mans	32	8	6	18	39	72	−33	22	
17	CA Paris	32	9	4	19	31	61	−30	22	
18	GSC Marseille	0	0	0	0	0	0	0	0	

Source: rsssf.com
