= Ligue 2 =

French association football league

- Organising body: Ligue de Football; Professionnel (LFP)
- Founded: 1933; 93 years ago (officially); 2002; 24 years ago (as Ligue 2)
- Country: France
- Confederation: UEFA
- Number of clubs: 18
- Level on pyramid: 2
- Promotion to: Ligue 1
- Relegation to: Ligue 3
- Domestic cup: Coupe de France
- Current champions: Troyes (3rd title) (2025–26)
- Most championships: Le Havre (6 titles)
- Broadcaster: beIN Sports
- Sponsor: BKT
- Website: Ligue2.fr (in French)
- Current: 2026–27 Ligue 2

Ligue 2 (French pronunciation: [liɡ dø], League 2), also known as Ligue 2 BKT due to sponsorship reasons, is a French professional football league. The league serves as the second division of French football and is one of two divisions making up the Ligue de Football Professionnel (LFP), the other being Ligue 1, the country's top football division. Contested by 18 clubs, it operates on a system of promotion and relegation with both Ligue 1 and the third division Ligue 3. Seasons run from August to May, with teams playing 34 games each, totalling 306 games in the season. Most games are played on Fridays and Mondays, with a few games played during weekday and weekend evenings. Play is regularly suspended the last weekend before Christmas for two weeks before returning in the second week of January.

Ligue 2 was founded a year after the creation of the first division in 1933 under the name Division 2 and has served as the second division of French football ever since. The name lasted until 2002 before switching to its current name. Since the league is a part of the LFP, it allows clubs who are on the brink of professionalism to become so.

== History ==
The second division of French football was established in 1933, one year after the creation of the all-professional first division. The inaugural season of the competition consisted of the six clubs who were relegated following the 1932–33 National season, as well as many of the clubs who opposed the creation of the first division the previous season. Clubs such as Strasbourg, RC Roubaix, and Amiens SC all played in the second division's debut season despite having prior grievances with the subjective criteria needed to become professional and play in the first division. The first year of the second division consisted of twenty-three clubs and were divided into two groups (Nord and Sud). Fourteen of the clubs were inserted into the Nord section, while the remaining nine were placed in Sud. Following the season, the winner of each group faced each other to determine which club would earn promotion. On 20 May 1934, the winner of the Nord group, Red Star Saint-Ouen, faced Olympique Alès, the winner of the Sud group. Red Star were crowned the league's inaugural champions following a 3–2 victory. Despite losing, Alès was also promoted to the first division and they were followed by Strasbourg and Mulhouse, who each won a pool championship, after the first division agreed to expand its teams to 15.

Division 2 champions (Pre-WWII)
Season	Winner
1933–34	Red Star Saint-Ouen
1934–35	CS Metz
1935–36	Rouen
1936–37	Lens
1937–38	Le Havre
1938–39	Red Star Saint-Ouen
Further information: French second division champions

Due to several clubs merging, folding, or losing their professional status, the federation turned the second division into a 16-team league and adopted the single-table method for the 1934–35 season. Due to the unpredictable nature of French football clubs, the following season, the league increased to 19 clubs and, two years later, increased its allotment to 25 teams with the clubs being divided into four groups. Because of World War II, football was suspended by the French government and the Ligue de Football Professionnel. Following the end of the war, the second division developed stability. Due to the increase in amateur clubs, the league intertwined professional and amateur clubs and allowed the latter to become professional if they met certain benchmarks. In 2002, the league changed its name from Division 2 to Ligue 2.

In November 2014, the presidents of Caen and Nîmes were amongst several arrested on suspicion of match fixing. The arrests followed a 1–1 draw between Caen and Nîmes in May 2014, a result very beneficial for each club.

== Competition format ==
There are 18 clubs in Ligue 2. During the course of a season, usually from August to May, each club plays the others twice, once at their home stadium and once at that of their opponents, for a total of 34 games. Teams receive three points for a win and one point for a draw. No points are awarded for a loss. Teams are ranked by total points, then goal difference, and then goals scored. At the end of each season, the club with the most points is crowned champion and automatically promoted to Ligue 1. If points are equal, the goal difference and then goals scored determine the winner. If still equal, teams are deemed to occupy the same position. If there is a tie for the championship or for relegation, a play-off match at a neutral venue decides rank. The second-place finisher are also promoted automatically to the first division. The fourth and fifth-place finishers play a one leg fixture at the fourth-place finisher's stadium, the winner of this fixture faces the third-place finisher at the third-place finisher's stadium, the winner of this fixture plays the 16th-placed team in Ligue 1 for the right to play in Ligue 1 the following season. The three lowest placed teams are relegated to the Ligue 3 and the top three teams from National are promoted in their place. While a decision was originally made that during the 2015–16 season only the best two teams would be promoted to Ligue 1, and the last two teams would be relegated to the National, that decision was later overturned by an appeal to the Conseil d'État and the French Football Federation.

In December 2021, the majority of LFP member clubs, including Championnat National club leaders, voted to contract Ligue 2 from 20 to 18 clubs for the 2024–25 season. This happened one year after Ligue 1 itself dropped from 20 to 18 teams for the 2023–24 season. The plan was for Ligue 2 to relegate four clubs to, and promote two from, National at the end of 2023–24.

== Clubs ==
=== Ligue 2 members (2025–26 season) ===
Location of teams in 2025–26 Ligue 2

Club	Finishing position last season	Location	Venue	Capacity
Amiens	11th	Amiens	Stade de la Licorne	12,097
Annecy	6th	Annecy	Parc des Sports	15,660
Bastia	8th	Furiani	Stade Armand-Cesari	16,078
Boulogne	3rd in Championnat National (promoted)	Boulogne-sur-Mer	Stade de la Libération	9,534
Clermont	16th	Clermont-Ferrand	Stade Gabriel-Montpied	11,980
Dunkerque	4th	Dunkirk	Stade Marcel-Tribut	4,933
Grenoble	9th	Grenoble	Stade des Alpes	20,068
Guingamp	5th	Guingamp	Stade de Roudourou	18,378
Laval	7th	Laval	Stade Francis Le Basser	18,739
Le Mans FC	2nd in Championnat National (promoted)	Le Mans	Stade Marie-Marvingt	25,064
Montpellier	18th in Ligue 1 (relegated)	Martigues	Stade de la Mosson	32,900
Nancy	1st in Championnat National (promoted)	Nancy	Stade Marcel Picot	20,087
Pau	13th	Pau	Nouste Camp	4,031
Red Star	15th	Paris (Saint-Ouen)	Stade Bauer	10,000
Reims	16th in Ligue 1 (relegated)	Reims	Stade Auguste-Delaune	21,029
Rodez	14th	Rodez	Stade Paul-Lignon	5,955
Saint-Étienne	17th in Ligue 1 (relegated)	Saint-Étienne	Stade Geoffroy-Guichard	41,965
Troyes	10th	Troyes	Stade de l'Aube	20,400

=== Seasons in Ligue 2 ===
There are 171 teams that have taken part in 88 Ligue 2 championships that were played from the 1933–34 season until the 2026–27 season. The teams in bold compete in Ligue 2 currently. The teams in italics represent defunct teams. The year in parentheses represents the most recent year of participation at this level.

- **46** seasons: Le Havre (2023), **Grenoble** (2027)
- **44** seasons: Amiens (2026)
- **42** seasons: Racing Besançon (2004)
- **41** seasons: Cannes (2001), Châteauroux (2021), Valenciennes (2024)
- **40** seasons: Béziers Hérault (1987), Angers (2024), **Dunkerque** (2027), **Red Star** (2027)
- **39** seasons: **Montpellier** (2027)
- **37** seasons: Gueugnon (2008)
- **36** seasons: Toulon (1998), Rouen (2004), Nîmes (2023), **Laval** (2027)
- **35** seasons: Alès (1996), **Guingamp** (2027)
- **34** seasons: Caen (2025)
- **33** seasons: **Reims** (2027)
- **31** seasons: Niort (2023)
- **30** seasons: **Boulogne** (2027)
- **27** seasons: Mulhouse (1998), Lorient (2025), **Nancy** (2027)
- **25** seasons: Tours (2018), Martigues (2025)
- **24** seasons: Brest (2019), **Clermont** (2027), **Nantes** (2027)
- **23** seasons: CA Paris (1963), Limoges (1987), Ajaccio (2025), **Metz** (2027)
- **22** seasons: Sedan (2013), Bastia (2026), Troyes (2026)
- **21** seasons: Gazélec Ajaccio (2019), Lens (2020)
- **20** seasons: Avignon (1991), Nice (2002), Sète (2006), Le Mans (2026), **Sochaux** (2027)
- **19** seasons: Troyes-Savinienne (1963), Angoulême (1984), Rennes (1994), Istres (2014), Orléans (2020), Toulouse (2022)
- **18** seasons: Aix (1972), **Dijon** (2027), **Saint-Étienne** (2027)
- **17** seasons: Louhans-Cuiseaux (2000), Auxerre (2024)
- **16** seasons: Quimper (1990), Chaumont (1991), Beauvais (2003), Strasbourg (2017), Paris FC (2025)
- **15** seasons: Créteil (2016)
- **14** seasons: Lille (2000)
- **13** seasons: Lyon (1989)
- **12** seasons: Stade Français (1985), Marseille (1996), Perpignan (1997), Monaco (2013), Arles (2015), Bordeaux (2024), **Rodez** (2027)
- **11** seasons: US Le Mans (1974), FC Bourges (1994)
- **10** seasons: Montluçon (1982), Abbeville (1990), Épinal (1997), ASOA Valence (2004), **Annecy** (2027)
- **9** seasons: Forbach (1966), AAJ Blois (1982), La Roche (1993), Charleville (1997)
- **8** seasons: Roubaix-Tourcoing (1963), FC Nancy (1964), Entente BFN (1978), Thonon (1987)
- **7** seasons: Cherbourg (1967), Saint-Dié (1982), Montceau (1990), **Pau** (2027)
- **6** seasons: Calais RUFC (1982), Nœux-les-Mines (1983), Racing Club (1986), Wasquehal (2003), Libourne (2008), Quevilly-Rouen (2024)
- **5** seasons: Colmar (1948), Toulouse (1937) (1953), Cambrai (1975), Le Puy (1989), Stade Poitevin (1996)
- **4** seasons: Tourcoing (1939), Douai (1949), Mantes (1975), Hazebrouck (1977), Amicale de Lucé (1980)
- **3** seasons: FC Lyon (1936), RC Roubaix (1936), Paris-Joinville (1972), La Ciotat (1973), Montélimar (1973), Tavaux-Damparis (1981), Saint-Seurin (1992), Stade Briochin (1997), Vannes (2011), Bourg-Péronnas (2018)
- **2** seasons: Club Français (1935), Saint-Malo (1935), Arras (1939), Dieppe (1939), Hautmont (1939), Longwy (1939), Antibes (1947), USA Perpignanais (1947), GSC Marseille (1951), Bataillon de Joinville (1969), Creil (1972), La Rochelle (1974), Paris Saint-Germain (1974), Nevers (1976), Melun (1979), Montmorillon (1981), Thionville (1981), Corbeil-Essonnes (1983), Fontainebleau (1983), Saint-Dizier (1988), Saint-Quentin (1992), Ancenis (1993), Thonon Evian (2016), Chambly (2021)
- **1** season: Bastidienne (1934), Deportivo Bordeaux (1934), FAC Nice (1934), Hyères (1934), Suisse (1934), Hispano-Bastidien (1935), ESA Brive (1946), Vichy (1946), Marignane GCB (1966), Merlebach (1971), Sochaux reserves (1971), Strasbourg reserves (1971), Évreux (1972), Mouzon (1972), Vittel (1974), Cholet (1976), Malakoff (1976), Haguenau (1978), Poissy (1978), Blénod (1983), Viry-Châtillon (1983), Roubaix Football (1984), Villefranche (1984), Yonnais (1984), FC Valence (1985), Châtellerault (1988), Melun-Fontainebleau (1988), Le Touquet (1989), CA Bastia (2014), Béziers (2019), Concarneau (2024)

== Previous winners ==
Club	Winners	Runners-up	Winning years	Runner-up years
Le Havre	6	1	1937–38, 1958–59, 1984–85, 1990–91, 2007–08, 2022–23	1949–50
Nancy	5	1	1974–75, 1989–90, 1997–98, 2004–05, 2015–16	1969–70
Metz	4	4	1934–35, 2006–07, 2013–14, 2018–19	1950–51, 1960–61, 1966–67, 2022–23
Lens	4	2	1936–37, 1948–49, 1972–73, 2008–09	2013–14, 2019–20
Nice	4	1	1947–48, 1964–65, 1969–70, 1993–94	1984–85
Lille	4	1	1963–64, 1973–74, 1977–78, 1999–2000	1970–71
Montpellier	3	3	1945–46, 1960–61, 1986–87	1951–52, 1980–81, 2008–09
Saint-Étienne	3	3	1962–63, 1998–99, 2003–04	1933–34, 1937–38, 1985–86
Strasbourg	3	2	1976–77, 1987–88, 2016–17	1971–72, 2001–02
Troyes	3	2	2014–15, 2020–21, 2025–26	1953–54, 1972–73
Toulouse	3	1	1981–82, 2002–03, 2021–22	1996–97
Lyon	3	–	1950–51, 1953–54, 1988–89	
Rennes	2	5	1955–56, 1982–83	1938–39, 1957–58, 1975–76, 1989–90, 1993–94
Valenciennes	2	5	1971–72, 2005–06	1934–35, 1936–37, 1961–62, 1974–75, 1991–92
Angers	2	4	1968–69, 1975–76	1955–56, 1977–78, 1992–93, 2023–24
Red Star	2	3	1933–34, 1938–39	1954–55, 1964–65, 1973–74
Sochaux	2	2	1946–47, 2000–01	1963–64, 1987–88
Ajaccio	2	2	1966–67, 2001–02	2010–11, 2021–22
Caen	2	2	1995–96, 2009–10	2003–04, 2006–07
Lorient	2	2	2019–20, 2024–25	1997–98, 2000–01
Alès	2	1	1933–34, 1956–57	1946–47
FC Nancy	2	1	1945–46, 1957–58	1959–60
Reims	2	1	1965–66, 2017–18	2011–12
Grenoble	2	–	1959–60, 1961–62	
Bastia	2	–	1967–68, 2011–12	
Auxerre	2	–	1979–80, 2023–24	
Nîmes	1	3	1949–50	1967–68, 1990–91, 2017–18
Sedan	1	3	1954–55	1971–72, 1998–99, 2005–06
Brest	1	3	1980–81	1978–79, 2009–10, 2018–19
Marseille	1	3	1994–95	1965–66, 1983–84, 1995–96
Monaco	1	3	2012–13	1952–53, 1970–71, 1976–77
Rouen	1	2	1935–36	1933–34, 1981–82
Stade Français	1	2	1951–52	1945–46, 1958–59
Toulouse (1937)	1	1	1952–53	1945–46
Tours	1	1	1983–84	1979–80
Bordeaux	1	1	1991–92	1948–49
Paris Saint-Germain	1	–	1970–71	
Gueugnon	1	–	1978–79	
RCF Paris	1	–	1985–86	
Martigues	1	–	1992–93	
Châteauroux	1	–	1996–97	
Evian	1	–	2010–11	

Notes:

- AS Nancy Lorraine is not the successor to FC Nancy.
- Toulouse FC is not the successor to Toulouse FC (1937).

== Top goalscorers ==
Season	Goals	Top scorer(s)	Club(s)
1933–34	54 goals	Jean Nicolas	Rouen
1934–35	30 goals	Jean Nicolas	Rouen
1935–36	45 goals	Jean Nicolas	Rouen
1936–37	30 goals	Viktor Spechtl	Lens
1937–38	29 goals	Hugo Lamanna	CA Paris
1938–39	39 goals	Harold Newell & Planques	Boulogne & Toulouse
1939–45	World War II		
1945–46	27 goals	Campiglia	Angers
1946–47	45 goals	Jozef "Pépé" Humpal	Sochaux
1947–48	28 goals	Henri Arnaudeau	Bordeaux
1948–49	41 goals	Camille Libar	Bordeaux
1949–50	27 goals	Edmund Haan	Nîmes
1950–51	23 goals	Thadée Cisowski	Metz
1951–52	34 goals	Egon Johnsson	Stade Français
1952–53	27 goals	Bror Mellberg	Toulouse
1953–54	36 goals	Jean Courteaux	RC Paris
1954–55	40 goals	Petrus Van Rhijn	Valenciennes
1955–56	32 goals	Petrus Van Rhijn	Valenciennes
1956–57	27 goals	Fernand Devlaeminck	Lille
1957–58	29 goals	Egon Johnsson	FC Nancy
1958–59	31 goals	Petrus Van Rhijn	Stade Français
1959–60	29 goals	Corbel	Rouen
1960–61	28 goals	Casimir Kozakiewicz	Strasbourg
1961–62	21 goals	Serge Masnaghetti	Valenciennes
1962–63	24 goals	Ernesto Gianella	Béziers
1963–64	21 goals	Abderrahmane Soukhane	Le Havre
1964–65	22 goals	Anton Groschulski	Red Star
1965–66	30 goals	Pierre Ferrazzi	Grenoble
1966–67	23 goals	Etienne Sansonetti	Bastia
1967–68	26 goals	Jacques Bonnet	Avignon
1968–69	55 goals	Gérard Grizzetti	Angoulême
1969–70	21 goals	Robert Blanc	Nancy
1970–71	20 goals 20 goals 20 goals	Nord: Yves Triantafyllos; Centre: Robert Blanc; Sud: Emmanuel Koum	Boulogne; Limoges; Monaco
1971–72	20 goals 28 goals 40 goals	Gr. A: Pierre Pleimelding; Gr. B: Yegba Maya Joseph; Gr. C: Marc Molitor	Troyes; Valenciennes; Strasbourg
1972–73	22 goals 31 goals	Gr. A: Eugeniusz Faber; Gr. B: Gérard Tonnel	Lens; Troyes
1973–74	26 goals 24 goals	Gr. A: Erwin Wilczek; Gr. B: Nestor Combin	Valenciennes; Red Star
1974–75	25 goals 28 goals	Gr. A: Georges Tripp; Gr. B: Jean Martinez	Laval; Nancy
1975–76	22 goals 25 goals	Gr. A: Boško Antić; Gr. B: Marc Berdoll	Caen; Angers
1976–77	30 goals 24 goals	Gr. A: Delio Onnis; Gr. B: Albert Gemmrich	Monaco; Strasbourg
1977–78	19 goals 23 goals	Gr. A: Giudicelli; Gr. B: Jean-Claude Garnier; Gr. B: Pierre-Antoine Dossevi	Alès; Dunkerque; Tours
1978–79	24 goals 26 goals	Gr. A: Antoine Trivino; Gr. B: Patrice Martet	Gueugnon; Brest
1979–80	16 goals 19 goals	Gr. A: Alain Polaniok; Gr. A: Bernard Ferrigno; Gr. B: Jacky Vergnes; Gr. B: Robert Pintenat	Reims; Tours; Montpellier; Toulouse
1980–81	32 goals 22 goals	Gr. A: Robert Pintenat; Gr. B: Marcel Campagnac	Toulouse; Sporting Club Abbeville
1981–82	18 goals 25 goals	Gr. A: Marc Pascal; Gr. B: Žarko Olarević	Marseille; Le Havre
1982–83	27 goals 18 goals	Gr. A: Włodzimierz Lubański; Gr. B: Christian Dalger	Valenciennes; Toulon
1983–84	23 goals 22 goals	Gr. A: Mario Relmy; Gr. A: Boubacar Sarr; Gr. B: Omar da Fonseca	Limoges; Marseille; Tours
1984–85	27 goals 28 goals	Gr. A: John Eriksen; Gr. B: Jorge Dominguez	Mulhouse; Nice
1985–86	22 goals 30 goals	Gr. A: Jean-Marc Valadier; Gr. B: Eugène Kabongo	Montpellier; RC Paris
1986–87	21 goals 20 goals	Gr. A: Tony Kurbos; Gr. B: Gaspard N'Gouete; Gr. B: Jean-Pierre Orts	Mulhouse; Bastia; Lyon
1987–88	21 goals 26 goals	Gr. A: Ray Stephen; Gr. B: Patrice Martet	Nancy; Rouen
1988–89	21 goals 28 goals	Gr. A: Roberto Cabanas; Gr. A: Franck Priou; Gr. B: Robby Langers	Brest; Mulhouse; Orléans
1989–90	26 goals 21 goals	Gr. A: Didier Monczuk; Gr. B: Jean-Pierre Orts	Strasbourg; Rouen
1990–91	23 goals 19 goals	Gr. A: Didier Monczuk; Gr. B: Christophe Lagrange	Strasbourg; Angers
1991–92	22 goals 23 goals	Gr. A: Jean-Pierre Orts; Gr. B: Didier Monczuk	Rouen; Strasbourg
1992–93	21 goals 18 goals	Gr. A: Franck Priou; Gr. B: Jean-Pierre Orts	Cannes; Rouen
1993–94	27 goals	Yannick Le Saux	Saint-Brieuc
1994–95	31 goals	Tony Cascarino	Marseille
1995–96	30 goals	Tony Cascarino	Marseille
1996–97	23 goals	Samuel Michel	Sochaux
1997–98	20 goals	Réginald Ray	Le Mans
1998–99	20 goals	Hamed Diallo	Laval
1999–2000	17 goals	Amara Traoré	Gueugnon
2000–01	21 goals	Francileudo Santos	Sochaux
2001–02	18 goals	Hamed Diallo	Amiens
2002–03	20 goals	Cédric Fauré	Toulouse
2003–04	17 goals	David Suarez	Amiens
2004–05	24 goals	Bakari Koné	Lorient
2005–06	16 goals	Jean-Michel Lesage & Steve Savidan	Le Havre & Valenciennes
2006–07	18 goals	Jean-Michel Lesage & Kandia Traore	Le Havre & Le Havre
2007–08	28 goals	Guillaume Hoarau	Le Havre
2008–09	18 goals	Grégory Thil	Boulogne
2009–10	21 goals	Olivier Giroud	Tours
2010–11	23 goals	Sebastián Ribas	Dijon
2011–12	15 goals	Cédric Fauré	Reims
2012–13	23 goals	Mustapha Yatabaré	Guingamp
2013–14	23 goals	Andy Delort & Mathieu Duhamel	Tours & Caen
2014–15	18 goals	Mickaël Le Bihan	Le Havre
2015–16	21 goals	Famara Diedhiou	Clermont
2016–17	23 goals	Adama Niane	Troyes
2017–18	24 goals	Umut Bozok	Nîmes
2018–19	27 goals	Gaëtan Charbonnier	Brest
2019–20	20 goals	Tino Kadewere	Le Havre
2020–21	22 goals	Mohamed Bayo	Clermont
2021–22	20 goals	Rhys Healey	Toulouse
2022–23	23 goals	Georges Mikautadze	Metz
2023–24	22 goals	Alexandre Mendy	Caen
2024–25	22 goals	Eli Junior Kroupi	Lorient
2025–26	18 goals	Tawfik Bentayeb	Troyes

== Records ==
- Fastest hat trick: 5 minutes by Angelo Fulgini (Valenciennes, 2016–17 season).
- Most titles: 6 by Le Havre.
- Number of points won by a team in a single season, without achieving promotion to Ligue 1:

77 points (1994–95 season) or 1.833 points per game (42 games) for Toulouse.

- Most goals (team): 128 scored by Angers in 40 games (1968–69 season).
- Most goals (player): 55 by Gerard Grizzetti, for Angoulême (1968-69 season) in 40 games.
- Most seasons in division: 41 Besançon and Cannes.
- Fastest goal: 8 (eight) seconds on 26 September 2009 by Rémi Maréval of FC Nantes against Nîmes.

== Broadcaster ==
=== France ===
Duration	Broadcaster
2012–13 → 2023–24	beIN Sports
2008–09 → 2011–12	Eurosport
2008–09 → 2009–10	Numericable
2020–21	Téléfoot
2021–22 → 2023–24	beIN Sports (2 matches); Amazon Prime Video (8 matches); L'Equipe (1 match from Amazon)
2024–25 → 2028–29	beIN Sports (all matches)

=== International ===
Country	Broadcaster	Duration
Vietnam	VTVCab	2022–23 → 2023–24 (all Pau FC matches)

==== Middle East and North Africa ====
Country	Broadcasters
MENA	beIN Sports
Israel	Sport5

== Sponsorship names ==
- Domino's Ligue 2 (2016–2020)
- Ligue 2 BKT (2020–present)
