= 1938–39 French Division 2 =

Sixth season of the second-tier football league in France

Division 2
- Season: 1938–39

Statistics of Division 2 in the 1938–39 season.

== Overview ==
It was contested by 23 teams, and Red Star Paris won the championship.

== League standings ==
Pos	Team	Pld	W	D	L	GF	GA	GD	Pts	Promotion or relegation
1	Red Star Paris	40	27	10	3	107	51	+56	64	Promoted
2	Stade Rennais	40	27	6	7	112	51	+61	60	Promoted
3	Nancy	40	21	7	12	68	50	+18	49	
4	Toulouse	40	20	8	12	79	49	+30	48	
5	Colmar	40	18	12	10	83	60	+23	48	
6	Stade Reims	40	19	9	12	70	46	+24	47	
7	Mulhouse	40	19	9	12	92	77	+15	47	
8	Nice	40	19	6	15	79	54	+25	44	
9	Charleville	40	18	7	15	72	77	−5	43	
10	US Boulogne	40	15	6	19	84	85	−1	36	
11	Girondins Bordeaux	40	15	6	19	70	78	−8	36	
12	Valenciennes	40	15	5	20	59	69	−10	35	
13	CA Paris	40	12	10	18	70	69	+1	34	
14	Nîmes Olympique	40	12	10	18	49	81	−32	34	
15	Longwy	40	14	4	22	80	96	−16	32	
16	RC Arras	40	10	12	18	47	64	−17	32	
17	Montpellier	40	11	9	20	52	76	−24	31	
18	AS Troyes	40	13	5	22	61	96	−35	31	
19	Olympique Alès	40	12	6	22	50	76	−26	30	
20	Olympique Dunkerque	40	11	8	21	76	119	−43	30	
21	Hautmont	40	8	13	19	61	97	−36	29	
22	Dieppe	0	0	0	0	0	0	0	0	Relegated
23	Tourcoing	0	0	0	0	0	0	0	0	Relegated

Source: rsssf.com
Colmar and Moulhouse to Nazi Germany championship between 1940 and 1944. Reims and Bordeaux also promoted after the war.
