= 1980–81 French Division 2 =

42nd season of the second-tier football league in France

Division 2
- Season: 1980–81

Statistics of Division 2 in the 1980/1981 season.

== Overview ==
It was contested by 36 teams, and Montpellier and Stade Brest won the championship.

== League tables ==
=== Group A ===
| Pos | Team | Pld | W | D | L | GF | GA | GD | Pts | Promotion or relegation |
|---|---|---|---|---|---|---|---|---|---|---|
| 1 | Montpellier | 34 | 21 | 8 | 5 | 54 | 17 | +37 | 50 | Promoted |
| 2 | Toulouse | 34 | 20 | 7 | 7 | 66 | 30 | +36 | 47 | |
| 3 | Besançon | 34 | 20 | 7 | 7 | 57 | 24 | +33 | 47 | |
| 4 | Béziers | 34 | 18 | 7 | 9 | 50 | 34 | +16 | 43 | |
| 5 | Angoulême | 34 | 16 | 10 | 8 | 46 | 24 | +22 | 42 | |
| 6 | Olympique Marseille | 34 | 16 | 7 | 11 | 40 | 33 | +7 | 39 | |
| 7 | Thonon | 34 | 14 | 9 | 11 | 40 | 39 | +1 | 37 | |
| 8 | Gueugnon | 34 | 14 | 8 | 12 | 43 | 32 | +11 | 36 | |
| 9 | Cannes | 34 | 13 | 9 | 12 | 42 | 36 | +6 | 35 | |
| 10 | Martigues | 34 | 13 | 7 | 14 | 42 | 44 | −2 | 33 | |
| 11 | Saint-Dié | 34 | 10 | 9 | 15 | 31 | 42 | −11 | 29 | |
| 12 | Grenoble | 34 | 11 | 6 | 17 | 33 | 52 | −19 | 28 | |
| 13 | Gazélec Ajaccio | 34 | 6 | 16 | 12 | 23 | 41 | −18 | 28 | |
| 14 | Libourne | 34 | 8 | 11 | 15 | 32 | 49 | −17 | 27 | |
| 15 | Montluçon | 34 | 10 | 5 | 19 | 29 | 53 | −24 | 25 | |
| 16 | Tavaux-Damparis | 34 | 6 | 12 | 16 | 31 | 49 | −18 | 24 | Relegated |
| 17 | Avignon | 34 | 7 | 7 | 20 | 37 | 66 | −29 | 21 | Relegated |
| 18 | Corbeil-Essonnes | 34 | 6 | 9 | 19 | 31 | 62 | −31 | 21 | Relegated |

Source: rsssf.com

=== Group B ===
| Pos | Team | Pld | W | D | L | GF | GA | GD | Pts | Promotion or relegation |
|---|---|---|---|---|---|---|---|---|---|---|
| 1 | Stade Brest | 34 | 20 | 9 | 5 | 59 | 25 | +34 | 49 | Promoted |
| 2 | Noeux-les-Mines | 34 | 18 | 8 | 8 | 48 | 28 | +20 | 44 | |
| 3 | Rouen | 34 | 16 | 10 | 8 | 43 | 31 | +12 | 42 | |
| 4 | Stade Rennais | 34 | 16 | 8 | 10 | 41 | 30 | +11 | 40 | |
| 5 | Berrichonne Chateauroux | 34 | 15 | 10 | 9 | 50 | 44 | +6 | 40 | |
| 6 | Thionville | 34 | 13 | 11 | 10 | 44 | 37 | +7 | 37 | Relegated |
| 7 | En Avant Guingamp | 34 | 12 | 11 | 11 | 38 | 35 | +3 | 35 | |
| 8 | Le Havre | 34 | 13 | 9 | 12 | 32 | 33 | −1 | 35 | |
| 9 | Orléans | 34 | 13 | 7 | 14 | 45 | 43 | +2 | 33 | |
| 10 | Stade Reims | 34 | 13 | 6 | 15 | 55 | 56 | −1 | 32 | |
| 11 | Abbeville | 34 | 9 | 13 | 12 | 44 | 48 | −4 | 31 | |
| 12 | Blois | 34 | 9 | 12 | 13 | 34 | 45 | −11 | 30 | |
| 13 | Stade Quimpérois | 34 | 10 | 10 | 14 | 27 | 39 | −12 | 30 | |
| 14 | Limoges | 34 | 11 | 7 | 16 | 32 | 48 | −16 | 29 | |
| 15 | Paris FC | 34 | 9 | 10 | 15 | 36 | 34 | +2 | 28 | |
| 16 | Dunkerque | 34 | 10 | 8 | 16 | 34 | 42 | −8 | 28 | |
| 17 | Montmorillon | 34 | 9 | 9 | 16 | 38 | 49 | −11 | 27 | Relegated |
| 18 | Caen | 34 | 6 | 10 | 18 | 25 | 58 | −33 | 22 | Relegated |

Source: rsssf.com

== Championship play-offs ==
| Team 1 | Agg. | Team 2 | 1st leg | 2nd leg |
|---|---|---|---|---|
| Montpellier | 2–5 | Brest | 2–3 | 0–2 |

== Promotion play-offs ==
| Team 1 | Agg. | Team 2 | 1st leg | 2nd leg |
|---|---|---|---|---|
| Nœux-les-Mines | 2–5 | Toulouse | 2–0 | 0–5 |

Toulouse was qualified to the play-off against 18th placed team of Division 1, Tours.
