= Žarko Olarević =

Serbian football manager and player

Personal information
- Date of birth: 28 July 1950 (age 76)
- Place of birth: Belgrade, PR Serbia, FPR Yugoslavia
- Height: 1.82 m (6 ft 0 in)
- Position: Forward

Youth career
- Mladi Proleter
- 1962–1968: Partizan

Senior career*
Years	Team	Apps	(Gls)
1968–1971	Partizan	24	(1)
1969–1971	→ Proleter Zrenjanin (loan)	60	(40)
1972–1976	Radnički Kragujevac	98	(43)
1976–1977	Royal Antwerp	27	(6)
1977–1981	Lille	135	(42)
1981–1983	Le Havre	67	(42)
1983–1984	Marseille	36	(19)
Total		447	(193)

International career
1967–1968	Yugoslavia U18	6	(3)

Managerial career
- 1985–1986: Marseille
- 1998: Radnički Kragujevac
- 1999–2000: Sutjeska Nikšić
- 2000: Slavia Sofia
- 2001–2002: Slavia Sofia
- 2003: Wydad Casablanca
- 2003: Zagłębie Lubin
- * Club domestic league appearances and goals

Žarko Olarević (Serbian Cyrillic: Жарко Оларевић; born 28 July 1950) is a Serbian former football manager and player.

== Club career ==
As one of the Bobek Babes, Olarević made his competitive debut for Partizan in the second half of the 1967–68 season. He later spent two seasons on loan at Proleter Zrenjanin, before returning to Partizan. In the 1972 winter transfer window, Olarević was transferred to Radnički Kragujevac.

In 1976, Olarević moved abroad to Belgium and signed with Royal Antwerp. He subsequently went to France to play for Lille, helping the club to promotion to the top flight in 1978. Between 1981 and 1983, Olarević spent two seasons at Le Havre. He retired after playing for Marseille in 1983–84.

== International career ==
At international level, Olarević represented Yugoslavia at two UEFA European Under-18 Championships, in 1967 and 1968.

== Managerial career ==
After hanging up his boots, Olarević became manager of Marseille, leading them to the 1986 Coupe de France final. He later served as manager of Bulgaria's Slavia Sofia, Morocco's Wydad Casablanca, and Poland's Zagłębie Lubin.

== Career statistics ==
Appearances and goals by club, season and competition
Club	Season	League		
Club	Season	Division	Apps	Goals
Partizan	1967–68	Yugoslav First League	4	0
Partizan	1968–69	Yugoslav First League	8	1
Partizan	1969–70	Yugoslav First League	—	
Partizan	1970–71	Yugoslav First League	—	
Partizan	1971–72	Yugoslav First League	12	0
Partizan	Total		24	1
Proleter Zrenjanin (loan)	1969–70	Yugoslav Second League	30	21
Proleter Zrenjanin (loan)	1970–71	Yugoslav Second League	30	19
Proleter Zrenjanin (loan)	Total		60	40
Radnički Kragujevac	1971–72	Yugoslav First League	3	0
Radnički Kragujevac	1972–73	Yugoslav Second League	28	7
Radnički Kragujevac	1973–74	Yugoslav Second League	34	25
Radnički Kragujevac	1974–75	Yugoslav First League	16	4
Radnički Kragujevac	1975–76	Yugoslav First League	17	7
Radnički Kragujevac	Total		98	43
Royal Antwerp	1976–77	Belgian First Division	27	6
Lille	1977–78	French Division 2	33	16
Lille	1978–79	French Division 1	38	15
Lille	1979–80	French Division 1	29	5
Lille	1980–81	French Division 1	35	6
Lille	Total		135	42
Le Havre	1981–82	French Division 2	33	25
Le Havre	1982–83	French Division 2	34	17
Le Havre	Total		67	42
Marseille	1983–84	French Division 2	36	19
Career total			447	193

== Honours ==
Proleter Zrenjanin

- Yugoslav Second League: 1970–71 (Group North)

Radnički Kragujevac

- Yugoslav Second League: 1973–74 (Group East)

Lille

- French Division 2: 1977–78 (Group B)

Marseille

- French Division 2: 1983–84 (Group A)
