= Éric Danty =

French footballer (1947–2020)

Personal information
- Full name: Éric Leon Danty
- Date of birth: 9 December 1947
- Place of birth: Morne-à-l'Eau, Guadeloupe, France
- Date of death: 9 October 2020 (aged 72)
- Place of death: Meaux, France
- Height: 1.68 m (5 ft 6 in)
- Position: Defender

Youth career
- 1955–1964: Étoile Morne-à-l'Eau
- 1964–1965: Alençon
- 1965–1967: USM Romilly

Senior career*
Years	Team	Apps	(Gls)
1967–1970	Reims		
1969–1970	→ Fontainebleau (loan)		
1970–1974	Mouzon		
1974–1977	Sedan	26	(3)
1977	→ Nœux-les-Mines (loan)		
1977–1978	Saint-Omer		
1978	Sedan		
1978–1982	Meaux		
- * Club domestic league appearances and goals

Éric Leon Danty (9 December 1947 – 9 October 2020) was a French professional footballer who played as a defender.

== Post-playing career ==
Danty created the Academy FC Meaux in 2007. He was the president of Meaux from 2010 to 2020.

== Death ==
Danty died on 9 October 2020 at the age of 72 in the Seine-et-Marne department.

== Honours ==
Meaux

- Division 4: 1979–80
