= AC Mouzon =

Defunct football club in Mouzon, Ardennes, France

- Full name: Amical Club Mouzon
- Dissolved: 1974

Amical Club Mouzon was a football club located in Mouzon, Ardennes, France. The club disappeared in 1974, having merged with CS Sedan Ardennes.

== History ==
The club participated for the first time in the Division d'Honneur Nord-Est in 1966–67, and won its first regional title the following season in 1967–68. That same season, Mouzon reached the round of 32 of the Coupe de France. During the club's first season in the Championnat de France Amateur (CFA), they finished last in the Group Est and returned to the Division d'Honneur.

The second Division d'Honneur title won by the club came just the following season in 1969–70, meaning promotion back to the CFA. Mouzon then achieved back-to-back promotions, winning the Group Est and therefore entering the Division 2 for the 1971–72 season. However, the club would only stay one season in the Division 2, and would be relegated to the recently created Division 3. They maintained their position in the Division 3 for two seasons before merging into CS Sedan Ardennes to create CS Sedan Mouzon Ardennes. Sedan had recently been relegated from the Division 1. The new club name would only last one season, though, and the club went back to CS Sedan Ardennes in 1975.

== Notable former players ==
- (France) Éric Danty
- (France) Maxime Fulgenzy
- (France) Michel Le Flochmoan
- (France) Gérard Tonnel
- (France) Patrick Zagar

== Honours ==
AC Mouzon honours
Honours	No.	Years
Division d'Honneur Nord-Est	2	1967–68, 1969–70
Championnat de France Amateur Group Est	1	1970–71
