= 1975–76 French Division 2 =

37th season of the second-tier football league in France

Division 2
- Season: 1975–76

Statistics of Division 2 in the 1975–76 season.

== Overview ==
It was contested by 36 teams, and Stade Rennais and Angers won the championship.

== League tables ==
=== Group A ===
Pos	Team	Pld	W	D	L	GF	GA	GD	BP	Pts	Promotion or relegation
1	Stade Rennais	34	22	6	6	82	22	+60	10	60	Promoted
2	Stade Lavallois	34	21	8	5	71	28	+43	7	57	Promoted
3	Lorient	34	15	9	10	55	36	+19	6	45	
4	Rouen	34	17	2	15	60	48	+12	9	45	
5	Amiens	34	15	8	11	47	42	+5	6	44	
6	Caen	34	16	8	10	54	48	+6	3	43	
7	Hazebrouck	34	12	12	10	42	34	+8	4	40	
8	Berrichonne Chateauroux	34	13	12	9	29	24	+5	0	38	
9	Tours	34	14	7	13	47	47	0	3	38	
10	Angoulême	34	13	6	15	51	54	−3	3	35	
11	Dunkerque	34	10	11	13	38	46	−8	3	34	
12	Paris	34	13	3	18	47	53	−6	4	33	
13	Entente BFN	34	9	11	14	42	51	−9	1	30	
14	US Boulogne	34	12	5	17	37	48	−11	1	30	
15	Stade Brest	34	9	11	14	34	57	−23	0	29	
16	CS Sedan Ardennes	34	8	9	17	43	75	−32	4	29	Relegated
17	Cholet	34	9	7	18	38	58	−20	3	28	Relegated
18	Malakoff	34	9	3	22	31	67	−36	2	23	Relegated

Source: rsssf.com
Rules for classification: 2 points for a win with an extra point for winning by a 2 goal difference

=== Group B ===
Pos	Team	Pld	W	D	L	GF	GA	GD	BP	Pts	Promotion or relegation
1	Angers	34	18	8	8	68	40	+28	9	53	Promoted
2	Red Star Paris	34	18	6	10	51	25	+26	8	50	
3	Toulon	34	17	8	9	50	31	+19	3	45	
4	Cannes	34	16	9	9	47	31	+16	2	43	
5	Gueugnon	34	15	10	9	37	31	+6	2	42	
6	Toulouse	34	13	11	10	62	53	+9	3	40	
7	Martigues	34	14	9	11	47	41	+6	3	40	
8	Besançon	34	14	9	11	46	40	+6	3	40	
9	Béziers	34	13	9	12	44	36	+8	4	39	
10	Auxerre	34	13	11	10	44	36	+8	2	39	
11	Gazélec Ajaccio	34	13	6	15	44	8	+36	4	36	
12	Épinal	34	10	8	16	42	52	−10	4	32	
13	Chaumont	34	9	12	13	41	56	−15	2	32	
14	Saint-Dié	34	11	8	15	36	53	−17	2	32	
15	Sète	34	8	12	14	44	43	+1	3	31	
16	Mulhouse	34	12	5	17	41	63	−22	2	31	Relegated
17	Montluçon	34	8	9	17	36	57	−21	2	27	Relegated
18	Nevers	34	6	6	22	29	74	−45	1	19	Relegated

Source: rsssf.com
Rules for classification: 2 points for a win with an extra point for winning by a 2 goal difference

== Championship play-offs ==
Team 1	Agg.	Team 2	1st leg	2nd leg
Angers	9–6	Rennes	3–2	6–4

== Promotion play-offs ==
Team 1	Agg.	Team 2	1st leg	2nd leg
Laval	3–1	Red Star	2–1	1–0

== Top scorers ==
Rank	Player	Nationality	Club	Goals	Group
1	Marc Berdoll	France	SCO Angers	25	Gr B
2	Božidar Antić	Yugoslavia	SM Caen	22	Gr A
3	Joachim Martinez	Argentina	Toulouse FC	21	Gr B
4	Eric Lhoste	France	SM Caen	20	Gr A
5	Serge Lugier	France	AS Angoulême	19	Gr A
6	Bernard Blanchet	France	Stade Lavallois	18	Gr A
