= 1972–73 French Division 2 =

34th season of the second-tier football league in France

Division 2
- Season: 1972–73

Statistics of Division 2 in the 1972–73 season.

== Overview ==
It was contested by 36 teams, and Lens and AS Troyes won the championship.

== League tables ==
=== Group A ===
Pos	Team	Pld	W	D	L	GF	GA	GD	Pts	Promotion or relegation
1	Lens	34	18	9	7	67	28	+39	45	Promoted
2	US Boulogne	34	21	3	10	52	34	+18	45	
3	Lille	34	19	6	9	60	26	+34	44	
4	Dunkerque	34	17	8	9	62	41	+21	42	
5	Stade Poitiers	34	15	9	10	54	48	+6	39	
6	Angoulême	34	14	11	9	40	34	+6	39	
7	Le Mans	34	13	11	10	49	54	−5	37	
8	Stade Brest	34	13	11	10	39	36	+3	37	
9	Rouen	34	16	4	14	62	49	+13	36	
10	Stade Lavallois	34	12	10	12	32	30	+2	34	
11	Lorient	34	14	5	15	38	36	+2	33	
12	Cambrai	34	12	6	16	39	57	−18	30	
13	CA Mantes la Ville	34	8	12	14	40	51	−11	28	
14	Blois	34	10	8	16	41	57	−16	28	
15	Bourges	34	9	9	16	39	56	−17	27	
16	Berrichonne Chateauroux	34	9	6	19	37	66	−29	24	
17	Caen	34	8	7	19	37	65	−28	23	Relegated
18	Amiens	34	7	7	20	36	56	−20	21	Relegated

Source: rsssf.com

=== Group B ===
Pos	Team	Pld	W	D	L	GF	GA	GD	Pts	Promotion or relegation
1	AS Troyes	34	23	7	4	71	16	+55	53	Promoted
2	AS Monaco	34	23	5	6	89	29	+60	51	Promoted
3	Avignon	34	17	7	10	53	49	+4	41	
4	Chaumont	34	13	13	8	55	39	+16	39	
5	Toulon	34	15	9	10	30	41	−11	39	
6	Mulhouse	34	15	8	11	43	39	+4	38	
7	Cannes	34	15	7	12	56	55	+1	37	
8	Besançon	34	15	7	12	46	46	0	37	
9	Montluçon	34	13	8	13	47	43	+4	34	
10	Toulouse	34	10	13	11	41	42	−1	33	
11	Sète	34	12	8	14	33	44	−11	32	
12	Limoges	34	10	10	14	45	56	−11	30	
13	Arles	34	10	10	14	35	52	−17	30	
14	Entente BFN	34	8	13	13	43	49	−6	29	
15	Gueugnon	34	9	9	16	48	39	+9	27	
16	ES La Ciotat	34	8	9	17	28	56	−28	25	Relegated
17	Cuiseaux Louhans	34	6	8	20	27	59	−32	20	Relegated
18	Montelimar	34	3	11	20	20	66	−46	17	Relegated

Source: rsssf.com

== Championship play-offs ==
Team 1	Agg.	Team 2	1st leg	2nd leg
Lens	4–2	Troyes	1–0	3–2

== Promotion play-offs ==
Team 1	Agg.	Team 2	1st leg	2nd leg
Boulogne	3–10	Monaco	2–2	1–8
