= Balkrishna Industries =

Indian tyre manufacturer

Balkrishna Industries Limited

- A BKT monster truck tyre
- Type: Public
- Traded as: BSE: 502355; NSE: BALKRISIND
- Industry: Auto and Truck parts
- Founded: 1987
- Headquarters: Mumbai, India
- Area served: Worldwide
- Products: Tyres
- Revenue: ▲₹9,810 crore (US$1.0 billion) (FY23)
- Net income: ▼₹1,078 crore (US$110 million) (FY23)
- Number of employees: 7000+
- Website: www.bkt-tires.com

Balkrishna Industries Limited (BKT) is an Indian multinational tyre manufacturing company based in Mumbai, India. Balkrishna Industries manufactures off-highway tyres used in specialist segmentations like mining, earthmoving, agriculture, and gardening in five factories located in Aurangabad, Bhiwadi, Chopanki, Dombivali, and Bhuj. In 2013, it was ranked 41st among the world's tyre makers. BKT sponsors various sports competitions in several countries, most notably Monster Jam.

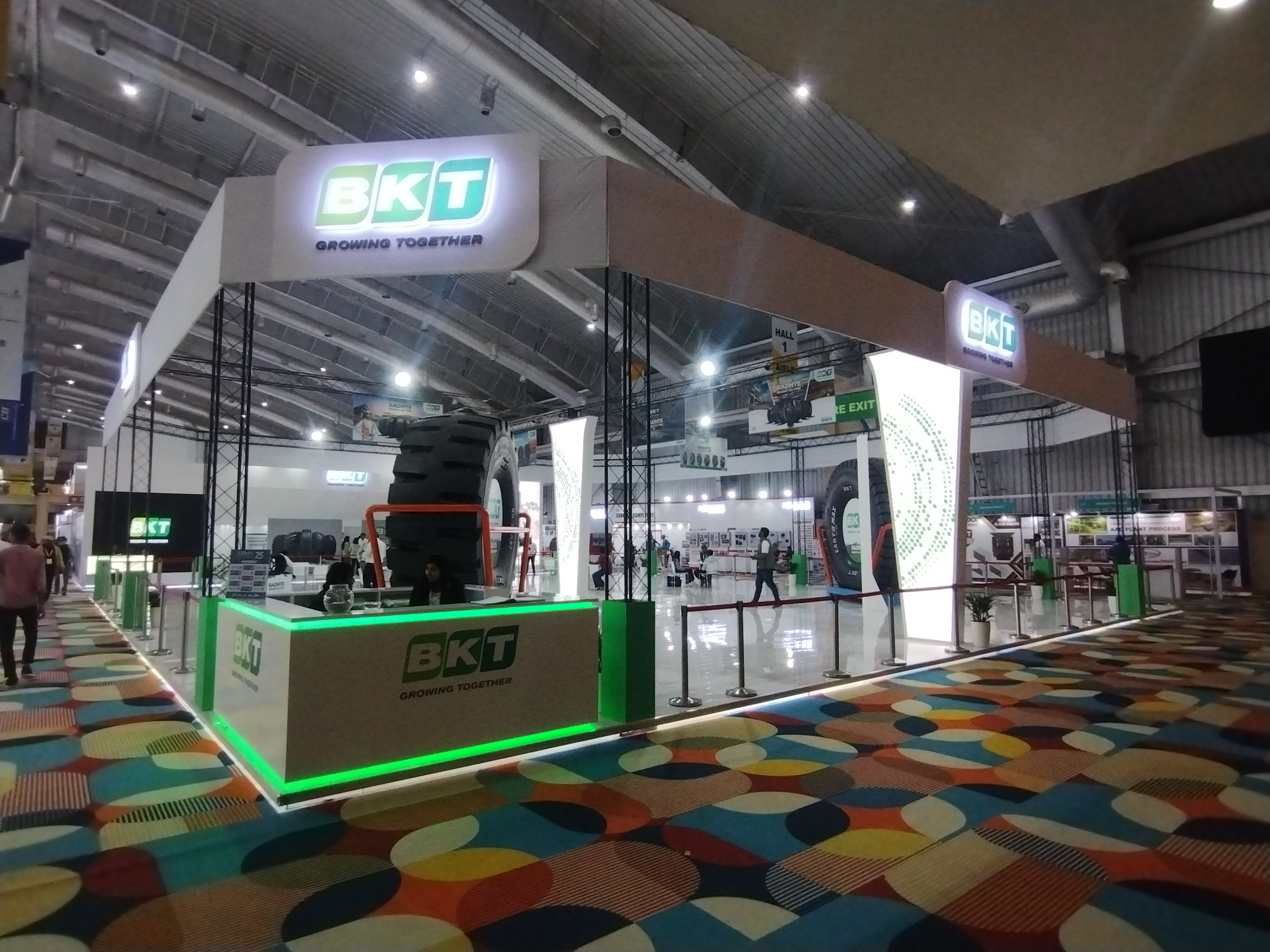
BKT at EXCON 2025, BIEC

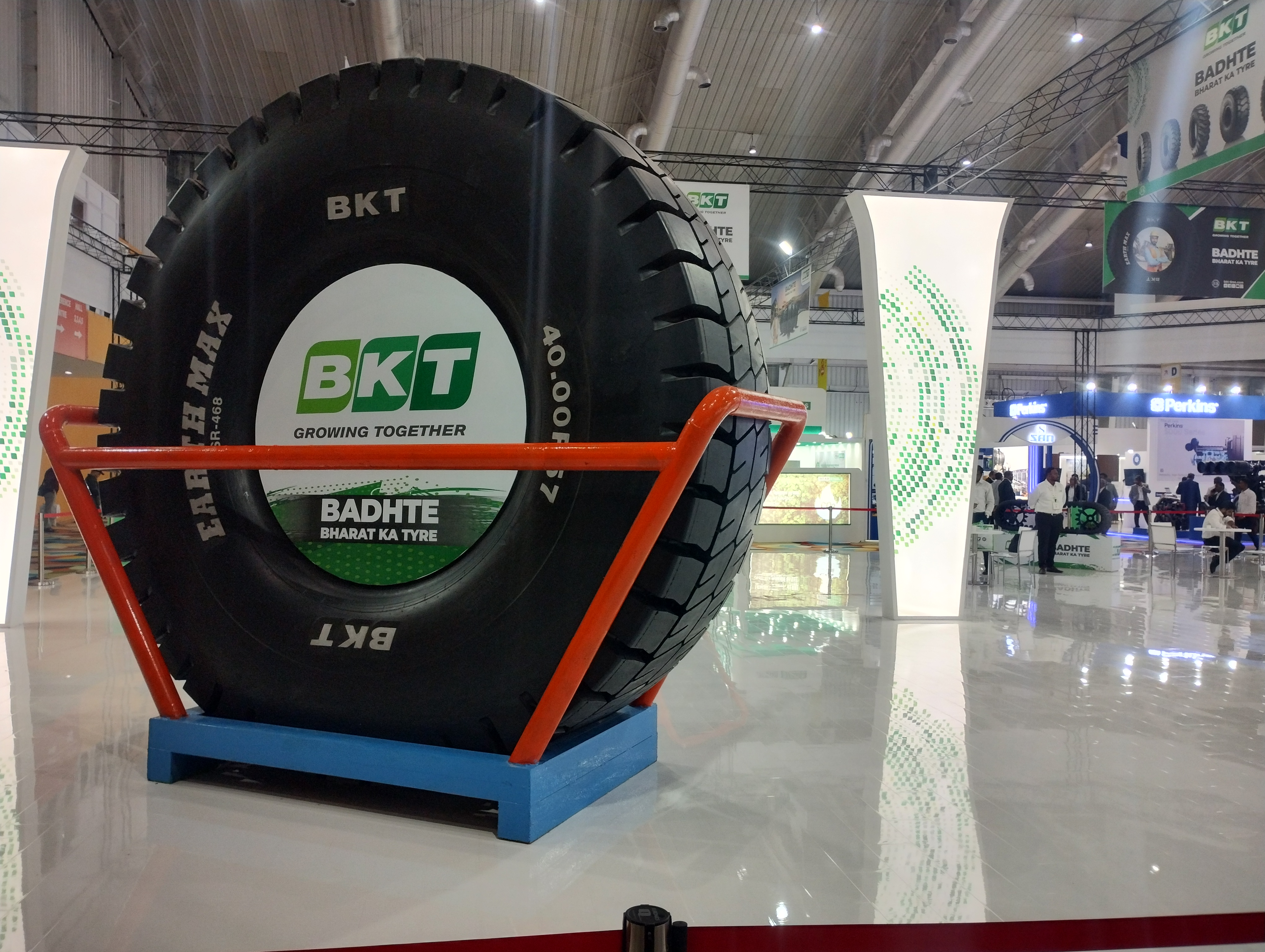
A BKT tyre at display in EXCON 2025, BIEC

== History ==
Balkrishna Industries began operations in the year 1987 with the inauguration of its first off-highway tyre manufacturing facility in Aurangabad. Subsequent growth in business allowed the company to open new facilities in Dubai (2002) and Chopanaki (2006). It also diversified its product line by introducing tyres for ATV, earthmoving and gardening vehicles.

== Operations ==
Balkrishna Industries is currently an OEM vendor for heavy equipment manufacturers like JCB, John Deere, and CNH Industrial. In 2014, BKT held a 8% market share of the global off-the-road tyre segment.

Balkrishna Industries predominantly caters to the replacement market in North America and Europe. Its North American office is located in Akron, Ohio, with one warehouse in Wando, South Carolina. About 80 percent of Balkrishna Industries' business in the United States is in the farm market.

In 2025, it incorporated a subsidiary in the Netherlands. It also announced a five-year roadmap involving 400 million dollars in investment.

In October 2026, BKT Tyres announced a partnership with Italian tyre maker Pirelli to manufacture Pirelli-branded premium tyres in India. It also announced a 50:50 joint venture where both companies will build and manage a factory in the country.

=== Sponsorships ===
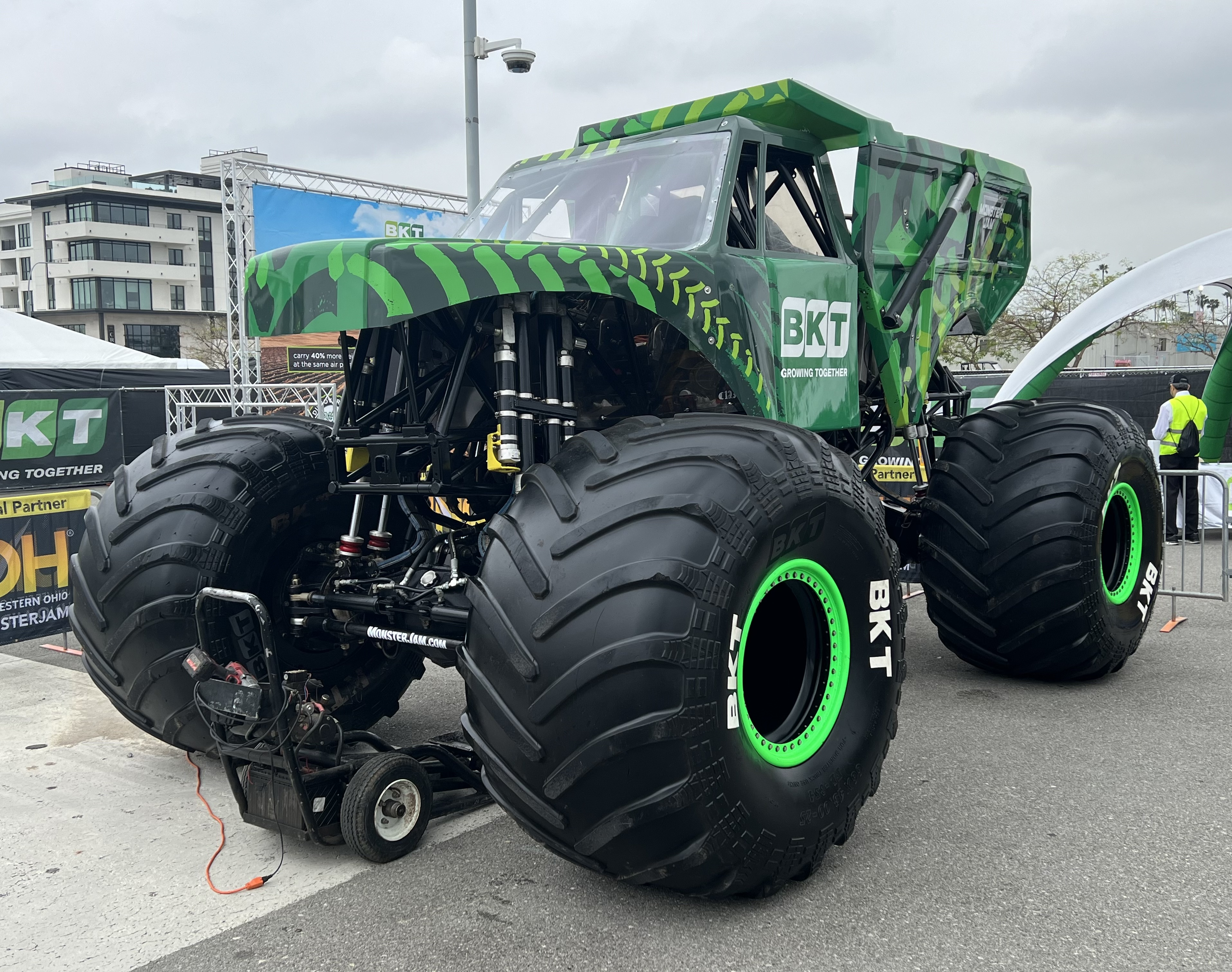
A monster truck promoting BKT, the official tire of Monster Jam (2024)

BKT Tires has been the official and exclusive tyre sponsor for Monster Jam (a competition involving monster trucks) since 2014.

In July 2018, BKT purchased naming rights for Italian football's second division, Serie B for three years, with the league being known as Serie BKT under the agreement.

On 15 January 2020, BKT signed an agreement with LFP to rename the French football second division as Ligue 2 BKT for four years. The sponsorship deal was extended until 2028.

On 2 September 2022, BKT were announced as northern hemisphere title sponsorship for the United Rugby Championship for three years.
