= 1936–37 French Division 2 =

4th season of the second-tier football league in France

Division 2
- Season: 1936–37
- Top goalscorer: Viktor Spechtl (30)

Statistics of Division 2 in the 1936–37 season.

== Overview ==
It was contested by 17 teams, and Lens won the championship.

== League standings ==
Pos	Team	Pld	W	D	L	GF	GA	GD	Pts	Promotion or relegation
1	Lens	32	23	4	5	86	46	+40	50	Promoted
2	Valenciennes	32	18	9	5	72	53	+19	45	Promoted
3	Saint-Étienne	32	19	2	11	98	50	+48	40	
4	Le Havre	32	14	8	10	68	50	+18	36	
5	Nice	32	15	5	12	52	41	+11	35	
6	Charleville	32	16	3	13	47	50	−3	35	
7	US Boulogne	32	14	4	14	54	49	+5	32	
8	Caen	32	12	7	13	44	53	−9	31	
9	Olympique Alès	32	11	8	13	49	51	−2	30	
10	Amiens	32	8	14	10	48	56	−8	30	Relegated
11	AS Troyes	32	13	4	15	54	63	−9	30	
12	Olympique Dunkerque	32	11	7	14	59	63	−4	29	
13	Montpellier	32	11	6	15	58	55	+3	28	
14	CA Paris	32	10	6	16	41	62	−21	26	
15	Nancy	32	9	6	17	44	64	−20	24	
16	Stade Reims	32	8	7	17	46	66	−20	23	
17	Calais	32	9	2	21	42	90	−48	20	

Source: rsssf.com
