= Football Amateur Club de Nice 1920 =

French football club

FAC Nice 1920
- Full name: Football Amateur Club de Nice 1920
- Nickname: Les facmens (The facmen's)
- Founded: 17 January 1920; 106 years ago; (refoundation) 25 January 2018; 8 years ago
- Dissolved: 20 July 2010
- Website: fac-nice.wixsite.com/fac-nice/

Football Amateur Club de Nice 1920, commonly referred to as FAC Nice or simply F.A.C, is a French association football club based in Nice. The club was founded in 1920, dissolved in 2010 and refounded in 2018.

== Stadium ==
From 1920 until 1934, Nice played its home matches at the Stade Bonfils, currently Stade Alfred-Méarelli. For the professional season in French league two in 1933–1934, Nice played for just one game at Stade du Ray.

== Honours ==
=== Côte d'Azur Championship ===
- First Series
  - champions (1): 1929–30

=== French Cup ===
- Best scores
  - 1/64°: 1929–30
  - 1/128°: 1930–31
  - 1/128°: 1931–32

== Identity of club ==
=== Name changes ===
- 1920–1933: Football Amateur Club de Nice
- 1933–1934: Football Athlétic Club de Nice
- 1934–1939: Football Amateur Club de Nice
- 1945-2010: Football Amateur Club Clémenceau de Nice
- From 2018: Football Amateur Club de Nice 1920
