= Toulouse FC (1937–67) =

- Full name: Toulouse Football Club
- Founded: 20 March 1937
- Dissolved: 1967; 59 years ago
- Ground: Stadium Municipal; Toulouse, Haute-Garonne; France
- Capacity: 10,000
Home colours	Away colours

Toulouse Football Club was a French association football team playing in the city of Toulouse, Haute-Garonne. The team was founded in 1937 and disappeared in 1967, in a merger with Red Star Olympique. Even though the club had the same name as Toulouse's current main club, Toulouse FC, the modern team is not a continuation of it.

== History ==
Toulouse Football Club was founded on 20 March 1937 and began in Division 2. The club finished second in the South Group of 1945–46 French Division 2 season and were promoted to Division 1 almost a decade after its foundation. Toulouse finished in 14th position in its first campaign in the top tier of French football. Following four mid-table finishes, TFC claimed fourth spot in 1949–50 French Division 1 season, the club's then highest position. However the club suffered a major downturn the following season when they finished 17th, being relegated to Division 2 in 1951. However, Le Téfécé were to win their first title by claiming the Division 2 in 1953, being promoted to the top-flight. This success was followed by the club's Coupe de France triumph in 1957. It was TFC's first and last major honour. Toulouse coped with this lack of title success by assuring themselves as a Division 1 mainstay, regularly finishing in the top half of the table after their return to the top flight (including a 2nd spot in 1955, the club's best finish ever).

In season 1960–61, Toulouse took part in the newly born Anglo-Franco-Scottish Friendship Cup, losing 6–2 on aggregate to Motherwell (Motherwell won -1 in Toulouse on August 7 1960 and 4-1 at home in Scotland on October 19 1960).

At the beginning of season 1961–62, Jean-Baptiste Doumeng (the 'red millionaire') became club president. Under his presidency, Toulouse reached fifth place in season 1963–1964.

On 16 June 1964, Kader Firoud, who had played for the club during wartime, became club coach. After a season of transition (1964–65) at the end of which the club finished in eleventh place in the league table, Firoud having devised a hyper-defensive playing style, Toulouse attained a remarkable fourth place in the following season, which gave them entry to the Fairs Cities Cup for season 1966–67. That same season, in the Coupe de France, after having successively eliminated Angoulême, FC Gueugnon, Olympique Lyonnais and FC Sochaux, the Red and Whites met RC Strasbourg in the semi-final. Lining up alongside the likes of Baraffe, Dorsini and Jacky Bernard, Soukhane opened the scoring for Toulouse in the 11th minute, before going into goal after his teammate, T.F.C. goalkeeper Devis, had been sent off. Strasbourg took advantage of their numerical superiority to score and take the tie into extra-time in the last few seconds of play, before scoring two further goals to kill off Toulousain hopes of reaching the final.

The following season, Toulouse were drawn to meet the Romanian club Dinamo Pitești in the first round of the Fairs Cities' Cup. T.F.C. won the first leg 3–0 in front of a remarkably small home crowd of just 5 000 spectators. In the second leg, however, Dinamo Pitești brought the aggregate score back to 4–4 in the space of nine minutes (Toulouse having scored an important away goal). T.F.C.'s hopes of getting through to the next round were ended by a late goal from Mihai Țurcan.

This was to be T.F.C.'s last season. President Doumeng sought badly needed finance for the club from a large number of hoped-for backers (including the town hall), but it was all in vain. The club was to move its operations to Saint-Ouen in 1967, thus allowing Red Star, then languishing in the second division, back into the top tier. Thus, Toulouse lost its beloved T.F.C., and professional football in the 'Pink City' was lost until 1979. Despite the controversy caused by this merger, it would be several years before the French football authorities voted for legislation which would limit the distance between merging football clubs under its jurisdiction.

A new club, Union Sportive de Toulouse, was founded in 1970; this club became Toulouse FC in 1977.

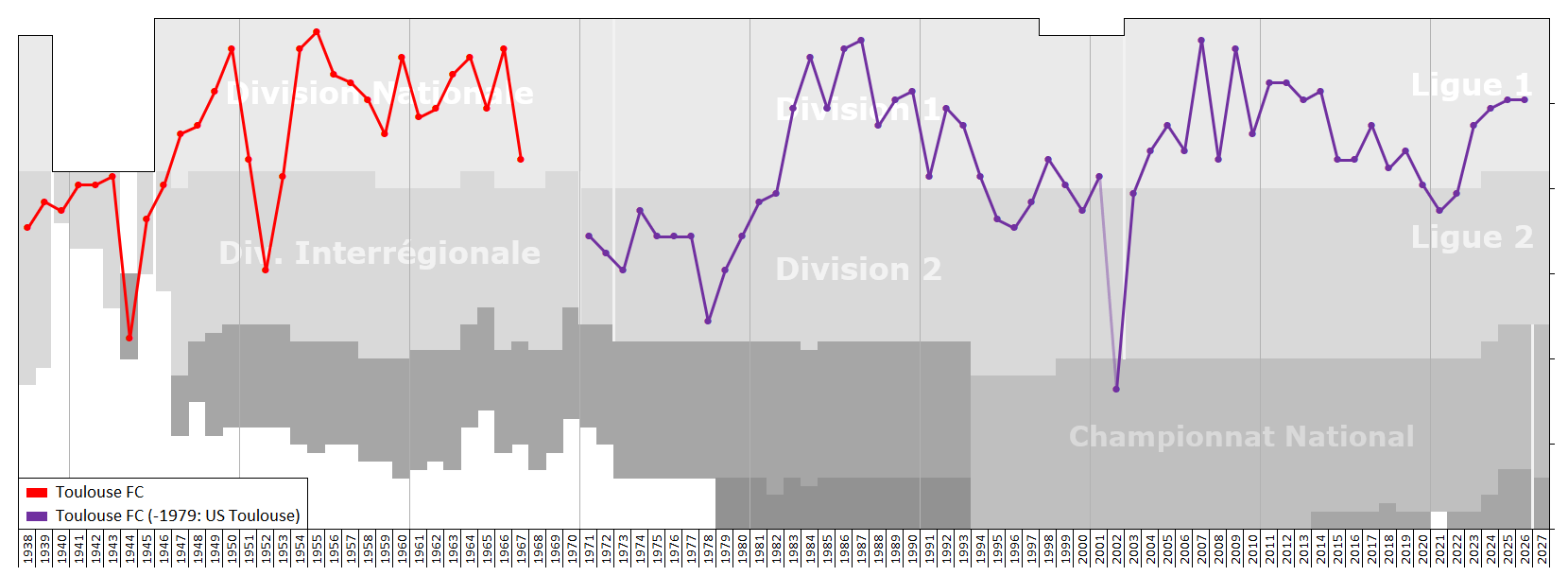
Historical league performance chart of the two Toulouse FCs

== Honours ==
- Coupe de France
  - Winners (1): 1956–57
- Ligue 1
  - Runners-up (1): 1954–55
- Ligue 2
  - Winners (1): 1952–53

== Toulouse in Europe ==
Season	Competition	Round	Club	Score
1966–67	Inter-Cities Fairs Cup	1st round	(Romania) Dinamo Piteşti	3–0, 1–5

== Managerial history ==
- (France) Pierre Cazal 1937–?
- (France) Jean Batmale ?
- (Hungary) Giuseppe Zilizzi ?
- (France) Henri Cammarata 1945–1947
- (France) Edmond Enée 1947–1952
- (France) Charles Nicolas 1952–1953
- (France) Jules Bigot 1953–1958
- (France) René Pleimelding 1958–1961
- (France) Léon Deladerrière 1961–1964
- (France) Kader Firoud 1964–1967
