= 1934–35 French Division 2 =

2nd season of the second-tier football league in France

Division 2
- Season: 1934–35
- Champions: Metz
- Promoted: Metz; Valenciennes
- Relegated: Club Français; Saint-Servan
- Top goalscorer: Jean Nicolas (30)

Statistics of Division 2 in the 1934–35 season.

== Overview ==
It was contested by 16 teams, and Metz won the championship.

== League standings ==
Pos	Team	Pld	W	D	L	GF	GA	GD	Pts	Promotion or relegation
1	Metz	26	18	5	3	78	22	+56	41	Promoted
2	Valenciennes	26	17	3	6	71	44	+27	37	Promoted
3	Rouen	26	16	2	8	80	46	+34	34	
4	RC Roubaix	26	14	5	7	63	45	+18	33	
5	Lens	26	12	8	6	70	49	+21	32	
6	Calais	26	12	7	7	79	62	+17	31	
7	CA Paris	26	9	6	11	52	63	−11	24	
8	Tourcoing	26	10	3	13	46	59	−13	23	
9	Saint-Étienne	26	10	3	13	46	59	−13	23	
10	Le Havre	26	8	6	12	56	72	−16	22	
11	Caen	26	9	3	14	61	57	+4	21	
12	Amiens	26	8	3	15	50	76	−26	19	
13	Villeurbanne	26	5	4	17	45	35	+10	14	
14	Hispano Bastidien	26	3	4	19	40	98	−58	10	Relegated
15	Club Français	0	0	0	0	0	0	0	0	Relegated
16	Saint-Servan	0	0	0	0	0	0	0	0	Relegated

Source: rsssf.com
