= 1935–36 French Division 2 =

3rd season of the second-tier football league in France

Division 2
- Season: 1935–36
- Top goalscorer: Jean Nicolas (45)

Statistics of Division 2 in the 1935–36 football season.

== Overview ==
It was contested by 19 teams, and Rouen won the championship.

== League standings ==
| Pos | Team | Pld | W | D | L | GF | GA | GD | Pts | Promotion or relegation |
|---|---|---|---|---|---|---|---|---|---|---|
| 1 | Rouen | 34 | 25 | 4 | 5 | 119 | 33 | +86 | 54 | Promoted |
| 2 | RC Roubaix | 34 | 23 | 6 | 5 | 98 | 40 | +58 | 52 | Promoted |
| 3 | Saint-Étienne | 34 | 24 | 4 | 6 | 99 | 49 | +50 | 52 | |
| 4 | Lens | 34 | 17 | 10 | 7 | 72 | 43 | +29 | 44 | |
| 5 | Amiens | 34 | 18 | 4 | 12 | 73 | 61 | +12 | 40 | |
| 6 | Caen | 34 | 17 | 5 | 12 | 68 | 57 | +11 | 39 | |
| 7 | Calais | 34 | 14 | 10 | 10 | 75 | 55 | +20 | 38 | |
| 8 | Montpellier | 34 | 15 | 7 | 12 | 54 | 46 | +8 | 37 | |
| 9 | Nice | 34 | 14 | 6 | 14 | 53 | 39 | +14 | 34 | |
| 10 | CA Paris | 34 | 12 | 9 | 13 | 43 | 55 | −12 | 33 | |
| 10 | Stade Reims | 34 | 15 | 3 | 16 | 62 | 74 | −12 | 33 | |
| 12 | FCO Charleville | 34 | 11 | 7 | 16 | 55 | 59 | −4 | 29 | |
| 13 | AS Troyes | 34 | 11 | 5 | 18 | 66 | 69 | −3 | 27 | |
| 14 | US Boulogne | 34 | 12 | 3 | 19 | 57 | 86 | −29 | 27 | |
| 15 | Olympique Dunkerque | 34 | 11 | 3 | 20 | 46 | 68 | −22 | 25 | |
| 16 | Le Havre | 34 | 8 | 6 | 20 | 47 | 86 | −39 | 22 | |
| 17 | Nancy | 34 | 3 | 5 | 26 | 33 | 122 | −89 | 11 | |
| 18 | Villeurbanne | 34 | 5 | 5 | 24 | 40 | 99 | −59 | 15 | Relegated |
| 19 | SC Nîmes | 0 | 0 | 0 | 0 | 0 | 0 | 0 | 0 | Relegated |

Source: rsssf.com
