= AC Avignonnais =

French football club

Avignon
- Full name: Avenir Club Avignonnais
- Founded: 1931; 95 years ago
- Ground: Stade Léon Dulcy
- Capacity: 500
- Chairman: Marc Maurin
- Manager: Christophe Chaintreuil
- Website: http://www.ac-avignon.com
Home colours

Avenir Club Avignonnais, known as AC Avignonnais or simply Avignon, is a football club based in the city of Avignon in southern France. The club notably competed in the Division 1 in the 1975–76 season.

== History ==
The club was founded in 1931 as Association Sportive Avignonnaise and played professionally from 1942 until 1948. The club was later renamed Olympique Avignonnais in a merger with Saint-Jean and became professional again in 1965.

In 1975, the team was promoted to Division 1, after winning a playoff match against FC Rouen. However, the 1975–1976 season was disastrous, as the club finished bottom with 20 Points, 7 victories, 6 draws, 25 defeats, with 30 goals scored and 80 goals conceded. The club was relegated from Division 2 in 1976 and had to forgo its professional status in 1981 due to financial problems.

The club found itself in the fourth division in 1983–1984, but bounced back to Division 2 after successive promotions from 1989 to 1991. In 1992, the club was renamed Club Olympique Avignonnais after a merger with Sporting Club Avignonais. Relegation to the sixth division (Division d'honneur) followed in 1994. The club was renamed Avignon Foot 84 in 2003.

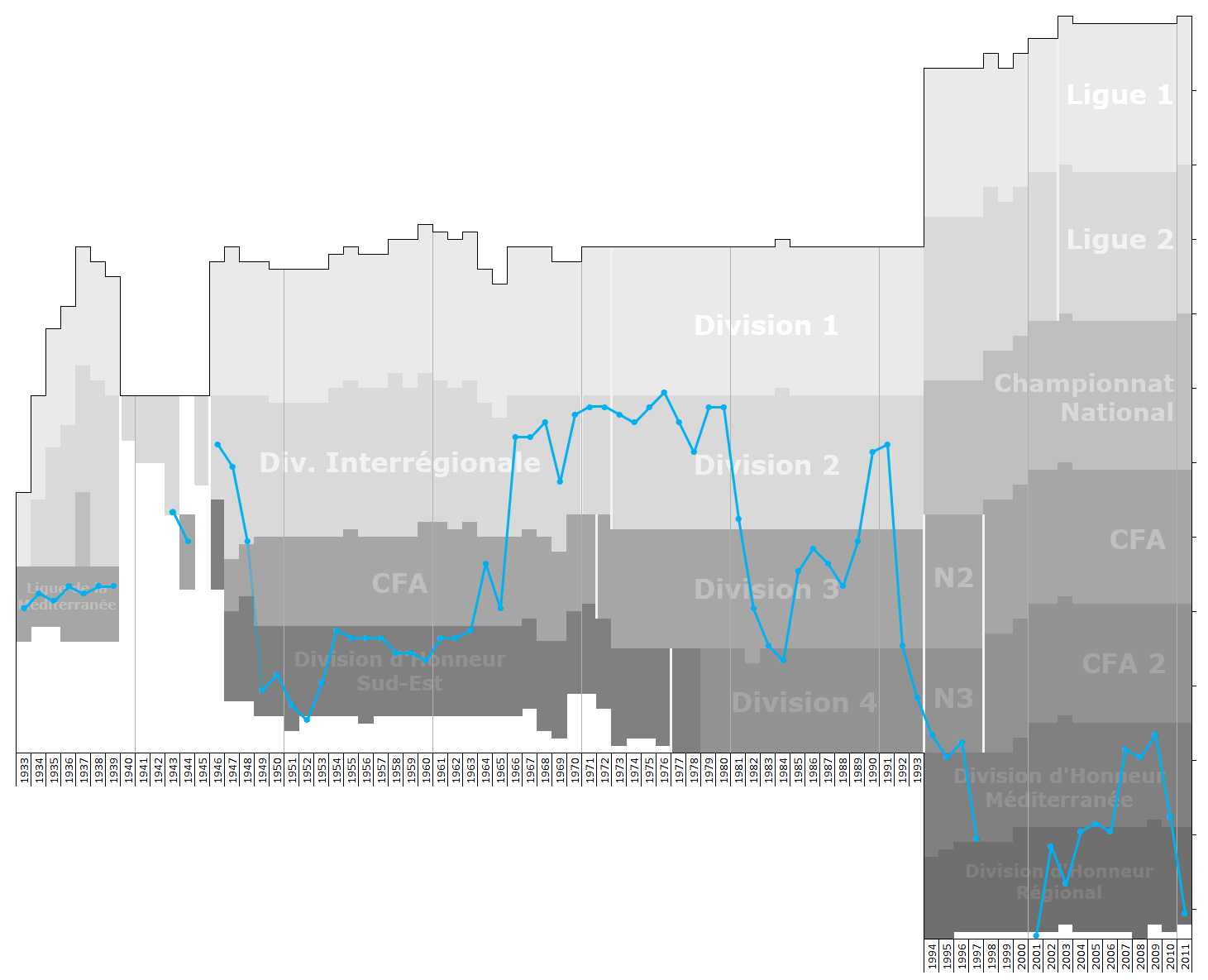
Historical league performance chart of AC Avignonnais

== Managerial history ==
- Dautheribes
- Huot
- Roger Cabanis: 1945–1948
- Mokhtar Arribi: 1957–1958
- Roger Vandooren: 1960–1965
- Léon Glovacki: 1965 – April 1968
- Robert Siatka: April 1968 – 1970
- Louis Dupal: 1970–1971
- Louis Hon: 1971–1972
- Marc Bourrier: 1972–1976
- Albert Batteux: 1976–1977
- Jacques Bonnet: 1977–1979
- Yves Sicard: 1979–1983
- Robert Pintenat: 1983–1986
- André Moulon: 1986–1988
- René Exbrayat: 1988–1991
- Georges Korac: 1993–1996
- Charles Decorzent: 2000–2002
- Franck Lucchesi: 2003–2005
- Christophe Chaintreuil: 2005–
