= Olympique Alès =

Association football club in France

- Full name: Olympique Alès en Cévennes
- Nickname: L'OAC
- Founded: 1923; 103 years ago
- Ground: Stade Pierre Pibarot (La Prairie); Alès (Gard)
- Capacity: 12,000
- Chairman: Jean-Christophe Lafont
- Manager: Jean-Marie Pasqualetti
- League: National 3 Group J
- 2023–24: National 2 Group A, 10th of 14 (relegated)
- Website: olympique-ales-cevennes.fr
Home colours	Away colours

Olympique Alès is a French association football club founded in 1923, based in the commune of Alès. The Cévennes club currently plays in the Championnat National 1, the fourth division of the French football league system. The club in the past has played for six seasons in Ligue 1.

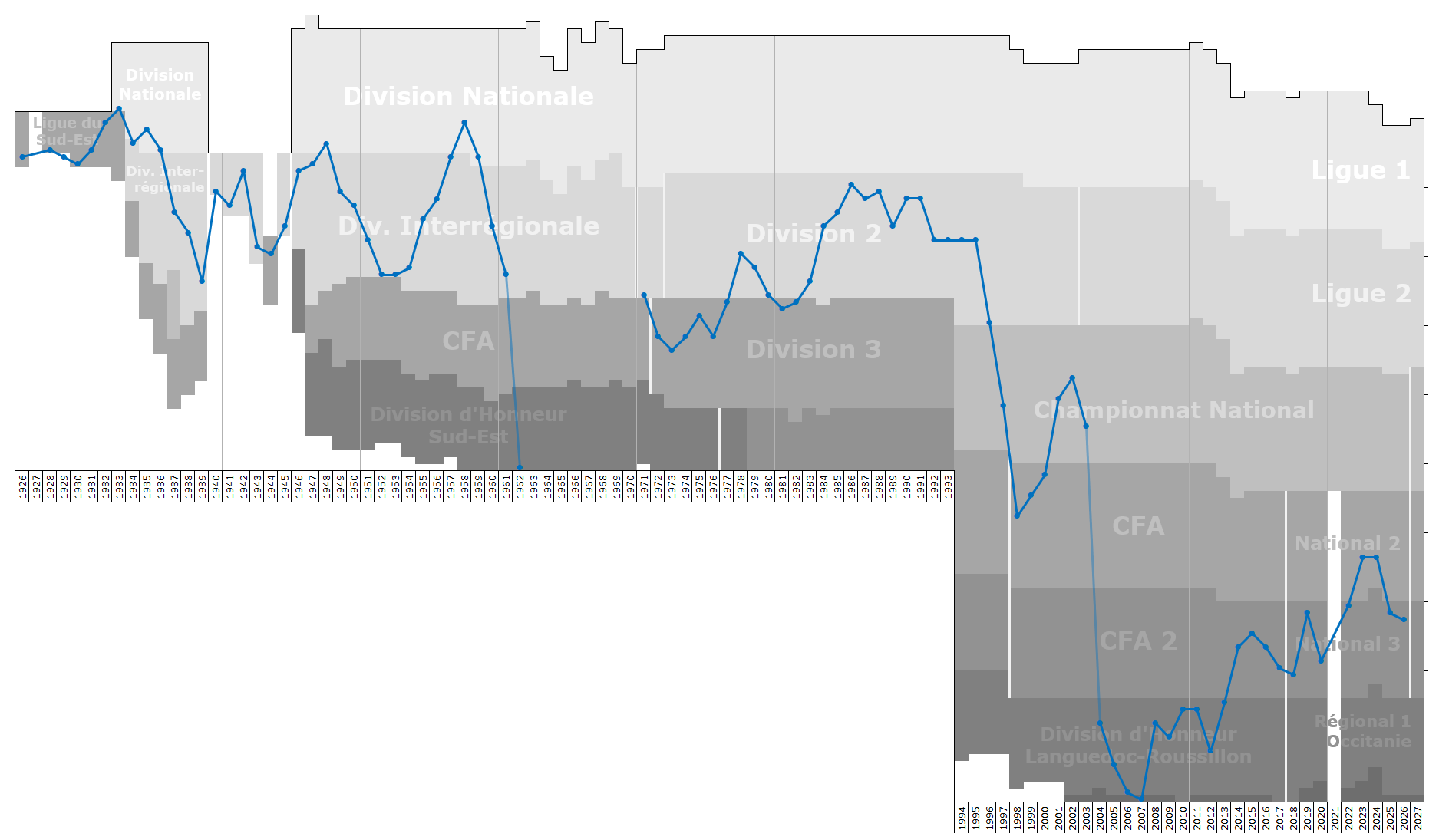
Historical league performance chart of Olympique Alès

== Honours ==
- Champion of France D2: 1957
- Champion of France D2-Sud, the Ligue 2's predecessor: 1934
- Vice-champion of France D2: 1947
- Semi finalists at the Coupe de France: 1987 (eliminated by Girondins de Bordeaux 0–0, 2–2)

== Coaches ==
- 2007–2008: Olivier Dall'Oglio
- 2021-2022: Stéphane Saurat
- 2022-2025 : Hakim Malek
- 2025- : Philippe Mallaroni

== Current squad ==
As of 19 August 2025

Note: Flags indicate national team as defined under FIFA eligibility rules; some limited exceptions apply. Players may hold more than one non-FIFA nationality.

No.	Pos.	Nation	Player
—	GK	FRA	Paul Bourdelle
—	GK	FRA	Cédric Boustouler
—	GK	FRA	Mathis Poleri Alunno
—	DF	FRA	Jeffrey Assoumin
—	DF	FRA	Zaki Ben Abbes
—	DF	FRA	Simon Chaveriat
—	DF	FRA	Nolan Hamard
—	DF	FRA	Tom Larcier
—	DF	FRA	Makan Traoré
—	MF	FRA	Uygar Barut
—	MF	FRA	Noé Cabezas

No.	Pos.	Nation	Player
—	MF	FRA	Yanis Coulibaly
—	MF	FRA	Elie Maurin
—	MF	FRA	Théo Peyrard
—	FW	FRA	Gianni Baptiste
—	FW	FRA	Nicolas Benezet
—	FW	FRA	Hamza Bouraja
—	FW	CIV	Rayane Ekra
—	FW	FRA	Enzo Fontaine
—	FW	FRA	Maxence Fournel
—	FW	FRA	Evan Paulet

== Notable players ==
- (France) Laurent Blanc (youth)
- (Liberia) James Debbah
- (France) Sabri Lamouchi
- (France) Franck Ribéry
