= AS Béziers Hérault (football) =

AS Béziers
- Full name: Association sportive de Béziers
- Founded: 1911; 114 years ago
- Dissolved: 1990; 35 years ago
- Ground: Stade de Sauclières, Béziers, France
- Capacity: 12000
Home colours

Association sportive de Béziers was a French association football team playing in the city of Béziers, Hérault. The team was founded in 1911 and was dissolved in 1990, due to financial problems. The team was the football section of successful rugby club AS Béziers Hérault.

== Honours ==
- Played in Ligue 1 in the 1957–58 season

== Managerial history ==
- Jules Dewaquez (1933–1934)
- Jean Jourdan
- Grumbaum
- Istvan Berecz (1947–1949)
- Joseph Azema (1949–1950)
- Curt Keller (1950–1951)
- René Llense (1951–1952)
- André Riou (1952–1953)
- Gaston Plovie (1953–1955)
- Pepi Humpal (1955–1958)
- Marcel Tomazover (1958–1959)
- Aimé Nuic (1959–1962)
- René Pleimelding (1962–1964)
- Brynley Griffith (1964)
- Marcel Tomazover (1964–1966)
- Spasoje Nikolić (1966–1967)
- Stanislas Golinski (1967–1969)
- Aimé Nuic (1969)
- Jean Jean (1969)
- Lubyche Stevanovitch (1969–1970)
- Hector Maison (1970–1971)
- Jean-Marie Couronne (1971–1973)
- Adolphe Martinez (1973)
- Camille Passi (1973–1974)
- Joseph Bonnel (1974–1977)
- Vojislav Melić (1977–1979)
- José Pelletier (1979–1983)
- Daniel Armand (1983)
- Jean-Pierre Destrumelle and Daniel Armand (1983–1984)
- Jean-Pierre Borgoni (1984)
- Angelo Morra (1984)
- Paul Dolezar and Daniel Armand (1984–1985)
- Paul Dolezar (1985–1986)
- Robert Vicot (1986)
- Daniel Armand (1986–1987)
- Eric Firoud (1987–1988)
- Daniel Rey (1989–1990)
- Garcia (1990)
