= Racing Besançon =

Football club based in Besançon, France

- Founded: 1904; 122 years ago
- Ground: Stade Léo Lagrange, Besançon
- Capacity: 10,500
- Chairman: Claude Cuinet
- Manager: David Le Frapper
- League: National 3 Group H
- 2023–24: National 2 Group D, 13th of 14 (relegated)
- Website: www.racingbesancon.fr
Home colours	Away colours

Racing Besançon is a French football club based in Besançon. It was founded in 1904. They play at the Stade Léo Lagrange. The club currently competes in the Championnat National 2, the fifth tier of France Football.

== History ==
Founded in 1904 by soldiers, the Racing Club Franc-Comtois Besançon, an omnisports club joined the USFSA. The football section was created in 1905. After having signed some good performances before the Great War (Eastern Champion 1909, 10, 11 and 12), the club was slowed down by hostilities.

Following the 2021–22 season, Racing Besançon was promoted to Championnat National 2 after an eight-year absence.

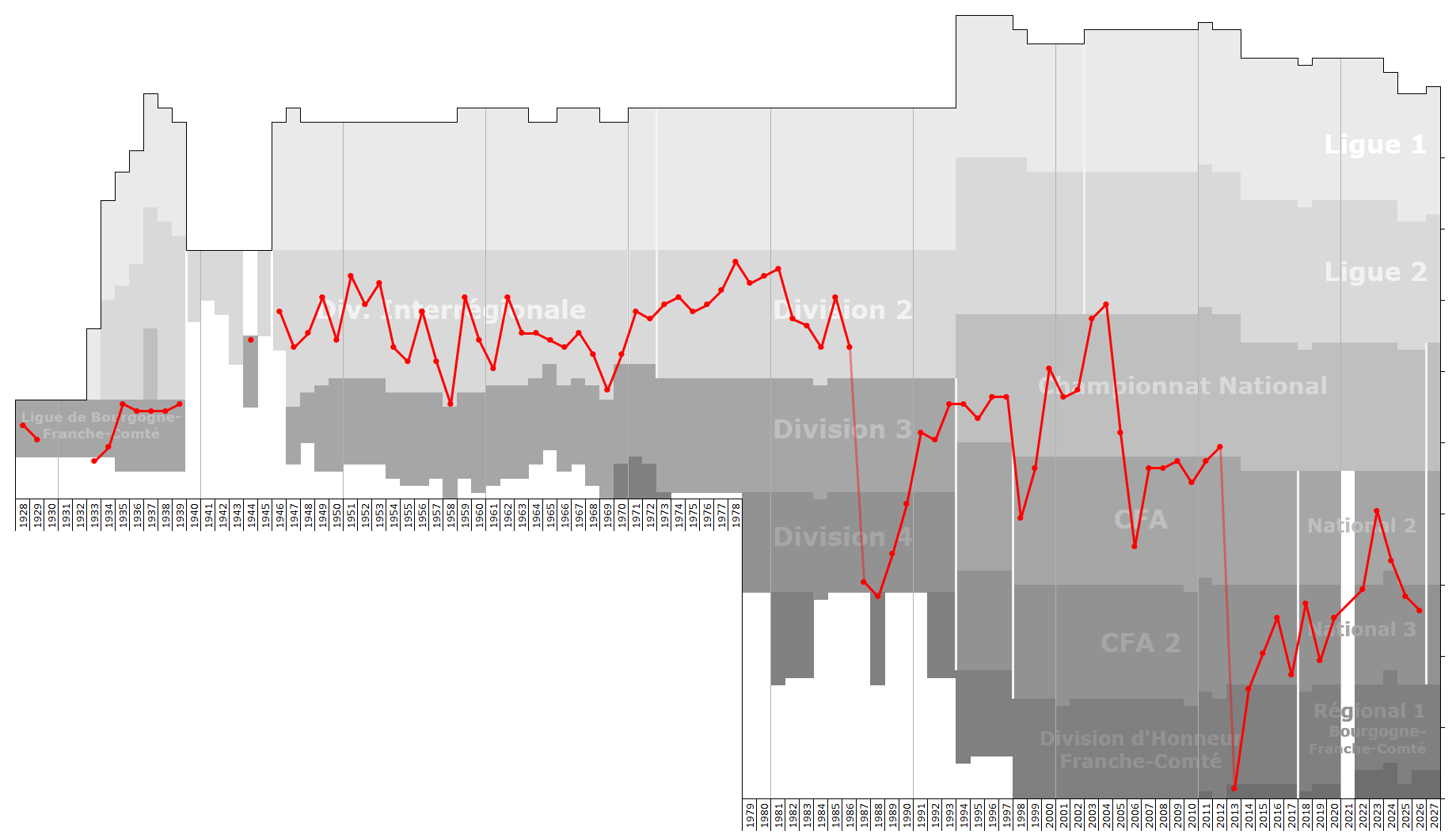
Historical league performance chart of Racing Besançon

== Kit ==
The club's kit is manufactured by Kappa and primarily consists of red.

== Notable players ==
- (France) Lucien Agoumé (youth)

== Honours ==
- Championnat National 2
  - Champions (1): 2021–22 [Group E]
