= Max Charbit =

French footballer (1908–2001)

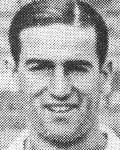
- Charbit

Personal information
- Full name: Max Nessim Charbit
- Date of birth: 17 June 1908
- Place of birth: Sig, Algeria
- Date of death: 14 February 2001 (aged 92)
- Place of death: Manosque, France
- Height: 1.75 m (5 ft 9 in)
- Position: Midfielder

Youth career
- 1918–: Sporting Club Sigois

Senior career*
Years	Team	Apps	(Gls)
–1927	Sporting Club Sigois		
1927–1930	Stade Marocain		
1930–1931	Olympique Marocain de Rabat		
1931–1935	Olympique de Marseille	193	(2)
1935–1939	Saint-Étienne		
1945–1950	EP Manosque		
1950	GSC Marseille		
1951	EP Manosque		

International career
1934–1935	France	4	(0)
- * Club domestic league appearances and goals

Max Nessim Charbit (17 June 1908 – 14 February 2001) was a French footballer who played as a midfielder for Olympique de Marseille, Saint-Étienne, and Nice in the 1930s. He also played four matches for the French national team in 1934 and 1935.

== Playing career ==
=== Club career ===
Born on 17 June 1908 in Sig, Algeria, Charbi began his career in the youth ranks of Sporting Club Sigois in 1918, aged 10, remaining at the club for nearly a decade, until 1927, when he joined Stade Marocain. In 1930, he went to Olympique Marocain de Rabat, with whom he won the Moroccan football league in 1931. A few months later, in January 1932, he was signed by Olympique de Marseille.

Together with Emile Zermani, Vilmos Kohut, and the Conchy brothers (Max and Henri), he was a member of the great OM team of the mid-1930s, which achieved a runner-up finish in the 1932–33 French Division 1 and reached back-to-back Coupe de France finals in 1934 and 1935, losing the former to Sète (2–1), but then captaining his side to a 3–0 win over Rennes in the latter. The following day, the journalists of the French newspaper L'Auto (the forerunner L'Équipe) stated that "he stood out in the second half for his finesse", while the journalists of Match l'intran stated that he was "sure in his interventions and his passes", assisting Charles Roviglione for the opening goal.

Charbit stayed at OM for three years, from 1932 until 1935, scoring one goal in 86 official matches. He then joined Ligue 2 team Saint-Étienne, with whom he also played for four years, until 1939, playing a total of 152 league matches for both OM and Saint-Étienne. Following a six-year hiatus during World War II, he returned to football in 1945, joining EP Manosque, with whom he played for six years, until 1951, except for a brief stint at GSC Marseille in 1950.

=== International career ===
On 11 March 1934, the 25-year-old Charbit made his international debut for France in a friendly match against Switzerland at the Parc des Princes in Paris, which ended in a 1–0 loss. The following day, the journalists of the French newspaper L'Auto (the forerunner L'Équipe) stated that he "marked Bossi well and served Aston well" and added that "he was the best in the first half, but less brilliant after the break". In total, he earned four international cap between 1934 and 1935.

== Death ==
Charbit died in Manosque on 14 February 2001, at the age of 92.

== Honours ==
Stade Marocain

- Moroccan football league:
  - Champions (1): 1931

Olympique de Marseille

- Coupe de France:
  - Champions (1): 1935
  - Runner-up (1): 1934
- Ligue 1:
  - Runner-up (1): 1932–33
