= Vincent Gasco =

Spanish footballer (1907–1961)

Personal information
- Date of birth: 22 July 1907
- Place of birth: Torreblanca, Spain
- Date of death: 5 December 1961 (aged 54)
- Place of death: 4th arrondissement of Paris, France
- Position: Defender

Senior career*
Years	Team	Apps	(Gls)
1927–1935	Sète		
1935–1936	Mulhouse		
1936–	Olympique Alès		
- * Club domestic league appearances and goals

Vincent Gasco (22 July 1907 – 5 December 1961) was a Spanish footballer who played as a defender for Sète in the early 1930s.

== Early life ==
Born in the Valencian town of Torreblanca on 22 July 1907, Gasco was living in the Hérault town of Sète in December 1931, where he worked as an electrician. Two years later, in October 1933, he was released from his military service.

== Career ==
Gasco joined the ranks of FC Sète at some point in the mid-1920s; for instance, in September 1927, he was playing for the club's reserve team, providing the assist for a consolation goal against a team from Ganges.

Together with István Lukács, Ivan Bek, and Ali Benouna, he was a member of the Sète team that won Ligue 1 and the Coupe de France in 1934, beating Olympique de Marseille 2–1 in the cup final. The following day, the journalists of the French newspaper L'Auto (the forerunner of L'Équipe) stated that Sète's backline, which consisted of Gasco and Englishman Joseph Hillier, had a "relatively easy task", while those of Le Miroir des sports stated that both he and Hillier made worrying mistakes.

After leaving Sète, Gasco joined Mulhouse, where he never really impressed, so he was then loaned to Olympique Alès in August 1936.

== Death ==
Gasco died in the 4th arrondissement of Paris on 5 December 1961, at the age of 54, while his wife, Jane Cabane, died 40 years later, on 8 August 2001.

== Honours ==
FC Sète

- Ligue 1:
  - Champions (1): 1933–34
- Coupe de France:
  - Champions (1): 1933–34
