= 1935 Coupe de France final =

- Event: 1934–35 Coupe de France
Marseille	Rennes
3	0
- Date: 5 May 1935
- Venue: Olympique Yves-du-Manoir, Colombes
- Referee: Julien Leclercq
- Attendance: 40,008

The 1935 Coupe de France final was a football match held at Stade Olympique Yves-du-Manoir, Colombes on 5 May 1935, that saw Olympique de Marseille defeat Stade Rennais UC 3–0 thanks to goals by Charles Roviglione, Vilmos Kohut and an own goal by Jean Laurent.

== Match details ==
5 May 1935

Marseille	3–0	Rennes
Roviglione 34'; Kohut 38'; Laurent 43' (o.g.)

Stade Olympique Yves-du-Manoir, Colombes
Attendance: 40,008
Referee: Julien Leclercq

GK	(France) Laurent Di Lorto
DF	(France) Max Conchy
DF	(France) Henri Conchy
DF	(France) Max Charbit (c)
DF	(Switzerland) Ferdinand Bruhin
MF	(France) Raymond Durand
MF	(France) Emile Zermani
FW	(France) Joseph Alcazar
FW	(France) Charles Roviglione
FW	(Hungary) Joseph Einsenhoffer
FW	(Hungary) Vilmos Kohut
Manager:
(Austria) Vincent Diettrich Assistant Referees: Fourth Official:

GK	(France) Jean Collé
DF	(France) Georges Rose (c)
DF	(Austria) Franz Pleyer
DF	(France) Jean Laurent
DF	(Argentina) Carlos Volante
MF	(France) Gaston Gardet
MF	(France) Joseph Rouxel
FW	(France) Georges Boccon
FW	(France) (Argentina) Attilio Bernasconi
FW	(France) André Chauvel
FW	(France) Alexandre Cahours
Manager:
(Austria) Josef Pepi Schneider

== See also ==
- 1934–35 Coupe de France
