= Charlie Cros =

French footballer and manager (1912–1993)

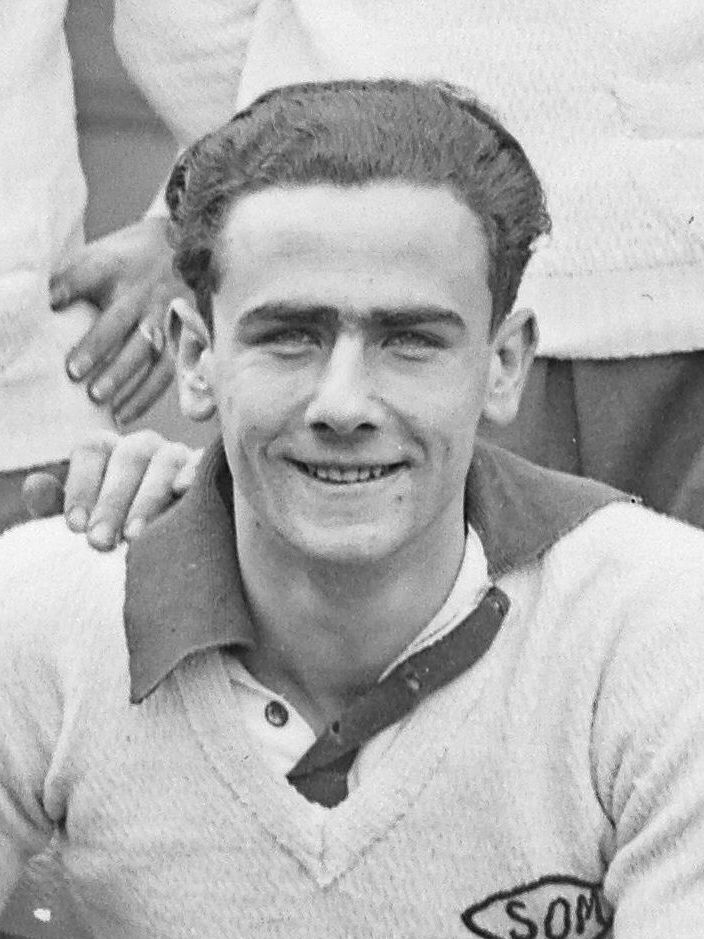
- Cros in 1931

Personal information
- Full name: Charles Cros
- Date of birth: 22 January 1912
- Place of birth: Saint-Ambroix, France
- Date of death: 22 November 1993 (aged 81)
- Place of death: 13th arrondissement of Paris, France
- Position: Midfielder

Senior career*
Years	Team	Apps	(Gls)
1930–1933	Montpellier		
1933–1936	FC Sète		
1936–1938	Red Star		
1938–1940	Montpellier		
1940–1942	Cannes		

Managerial career
- 1947–1948: Nancy
- 1949–1950: Saint Eugène
- 1951–1952: Union sportive seynoise
- 1952–1953: OGC Nice (amateurs)
- * Club domestic league appearances and goals

Charles Cros, better known as Charlie Cros (22 January 1912 – 22 November 1993), was a French footballer who played as a midfielder for Montpellier, FC Sète, and Red Star in the 1930s.

== Early life ==
Born on 22 January 1912 in Saint-Ambroix, a small village in Gard, Cros began playing football at the Lycée de Montpellier, where he not only studied, but also eagerly awaited break times to play this sport, in which he soon stood out for his feints and dribbles.

== Playing career ==
=== Montpellier ===
Together with several fellow students, he formed a football club named Sporting Club Montpellier, which, after some successes, ran into difficulties, prompting its members to join Montpellier HSC. A member of its youth ranks, Cros helped the club's U-18 team win the Languedoc championship in 1928, and the South-East championship in 1929. That same year, Cros helped the Montpellier high school reach the final of the French school championship in Colombes, which ended in a narrow 1–0 loss, courtesy of a penalty kick. In 1930, he helped the junior team reach the final of the South-East championship, and was among the Montpellier students who were proclaimed champions of France Universitaire. Bearing an "uncanny resemblance" to the Yugoslav Dušan Petković, who taught him to highlight his natural qualities, such as his stride, his feints, the precision of his passes, and the power of his shot.

During the 1930–31 season, Cros made his first-team debut, occupying the position of right midfielder and making an immediate impact on the team, as they went on to reach the 1931 Coupe de France final, which ended in a 3–0 loss to Club Français. The following day, the journalists of the French newspaper L'Auto (currently known as L'Équipe) stated that he "was far from repeating his remarkable exhibition against Amiens".

=== Sète ===
In 1933, Cros followed his coach René Dedieu to the top-flight team FC Sète, scoring 8 goals in 20 Ligue 1 matches in his first season there, actively contributing to the title of the Sètes. Together with István Lukács, Ivan Bek, and Ali Benouna, he was a member of the Sète team that won the double, the 1933–34 French Division 1 and the French Cup, beating Olympique de Marseille 2–1 in the final, in which he did not play as Dedieu preferred Marcel Miquel. During his time at Sète, he was called up to the regional selection, and to the France B team, he was then considered as a candidate for the French team.

=== Later career ===
Cros stayed at Sète for three years, from 1933 until 1936, when he signed for Red Star, with whom he played for two years, until 1938, gradually losing prominence there, perhaps due to injuries. In 1938, he returned to Montpellier, now in the second division, staying there until the outbreak of the First World War, after which he joined Cannes; having been a professional at Sète and Red Star, he was no longer so at Cannes. By the time he retired in 1942, he was the only non-Cannes player in the squad. Having been reclassified as an amateur, he began earning a living as a departmental inspector of the CG (General Football Club) in Perpignan, where he played as an amateur at USA Perpignan, who won the Languedoc Championship, and later he even created a football school in the city.

== Managerial career ==
In 1947, Cros took over Nancy, then in the first division, while running an import-export business. In 1949, he was hired by Saint Eugène in Algeria, with whom he won the North African Championship in 1950. Around 1951, he returned to his homeland to become the coach of the now-defunct Union sportive seynoise in the French amateur championship. The following year, he was hired by OGC Nice as the assistant coach to Mario Zatelli, whom he replaced for the last six matches of the 1952–53 season, guiding his team to kep victories that kept the club in the first division.

Outside football, Cros sought to improve his intellectual culture, easily passing his baccalaureate and then obtaining a law degree.

== Honours ==
Montpellier

- Coupe de France:
  - Runner-up (1): 1930–31

FC Sète

- Coupe de France:
  - Champions (1): 1933–34
- Ligue 1:
  - Champions (1): 1933–34
