= 1934 Coupe de France final =

- Event: 1933–34 Coupe de France
Sète	Marseille
2	1
- Date: 6 May 1934
- Venue: Olympique Yves-du-Manoir, Colombes
- Referee: Jules Baert
- Attendance: 40,600

The 1934 Coupe de France final was a football match held at Stade Olympique Yves-du-Manoir, Colombes on May 6, 1934, that saw FC Sète defeat Olympique de Marseille 2–1 thanks to goals by Istvan Lukacs.

== Match details ==
6 May 1934

Sète	2–1	Marseille
Lukacs 22', 75'		Zermani 2'

Stade Olympique Yves-du-Manoir, Colombes
Attendance: 40,600
Referee: Jules Baert

GK	(France) René Llense
DF	(France) Joseph Hillier
DF	(France) Vincent Gasco
DF	(France) Louis Gabrillargues
DF	(Hungary) Márton Bukovi
MF	(France) Yves Dupont
MF	(France) Jules Monsallier
FW	(France) (Kingdom of Yugoslavia) Yvan Beck (c)
FW	(Hungary) Istvan Lukacs
FW	(France) Marcel Miquel
FW	(France) Ali Benouna
Manager:
(France) René Dedieu Assistant Referees: Fourth Official:

GK	(France) Laurent Di Lorto
DF	(France) Max Conchy
DF	(France) Henri Conchy
DF	(France) Max Charbit
DF	(Austria) Leopold Drucker
MF	(France) René Schillemann
MF	(France) Emile Zermani
FW	(France) Joseph Alcazar
FW	(France) Jean Boyer (c)
FW	(Hungary) József Eisenhoffer
FW	(Hungary) Vilmos Kohut
Manager:
(Austria) Vincent Diettrich

== See also ==
- 1933–34 Coupe de France
