= Marcel Miquel =

French footballer (1912–1994)

Personal information
- Full name: Marcel Laurent Jean Miquel
- Date of birth: 12 December 1913
- Place of birth: Bédarieux, France
- Date of death: 7 February 1994 (aged 81)
- Place of death: Cannes, France
- Height: 1.70 m (5 ft 7 in)
- Position: Forward

Youth career
- 1923–: Bédarieux

Senior career*
Years	Team	Apps	(Gls)
?–1932	Bédarieux		
1932–1935	Sète		
1935–1936	Cannes		
1936–1937	Olympique de Marseille		
1937–1939	Nice		
- * Club domestic league appearances and goals

Marcel Laurent Jean Miquel (12 December 1913 – 7 February 1994) was a French footballer who played as a forward for Sète and Olympique de Marseille in the 1930s.

== Career ==
Born in Bédarieux on 12 December 1913, Miquel began his football career in the youth ranks of a modest club based in his hometown in 1923, aged 10, with whom he played for nine years, until 1932, when he joined Sète. Together with István Lukács, Ivan Bek, and Ali Benouna, he was a member of the Sète team that won the double in 1934, the Ligue 1 and the Coupe de France, beating Olympique de Marseille 2–1 in the cup final. The following day, the journalists of L'Auto stated that he "was the player who covered the most ground, with his activity, although a little disordered, was infectious".

Miquel stayed at Sète for three years, from 1932 until 1935, when he joined Cannes, where he stayed one season, as he then joined Olympique de Marseille in 1936, where he also stayed one season, scoring a total of 4 goals in 13 official matches to help OM win the 1936–37 French Division 1. In 1937, he joined Nice, where he retired in 1939, aged 36.

== Death ==
Miquel died in Cannes on 7 February 1994, at the age of 27.

== Honours ==
FC Sète

- Ligue 1:
  - Champions (1): 1933–34
- Coupe de France:
  - Champions (1): 1933–34

Olympique de Marseille

- Ligue 1:
  - Champions (1): 1936–37
