= Yves Dupont =

French footballer (1908–1991)

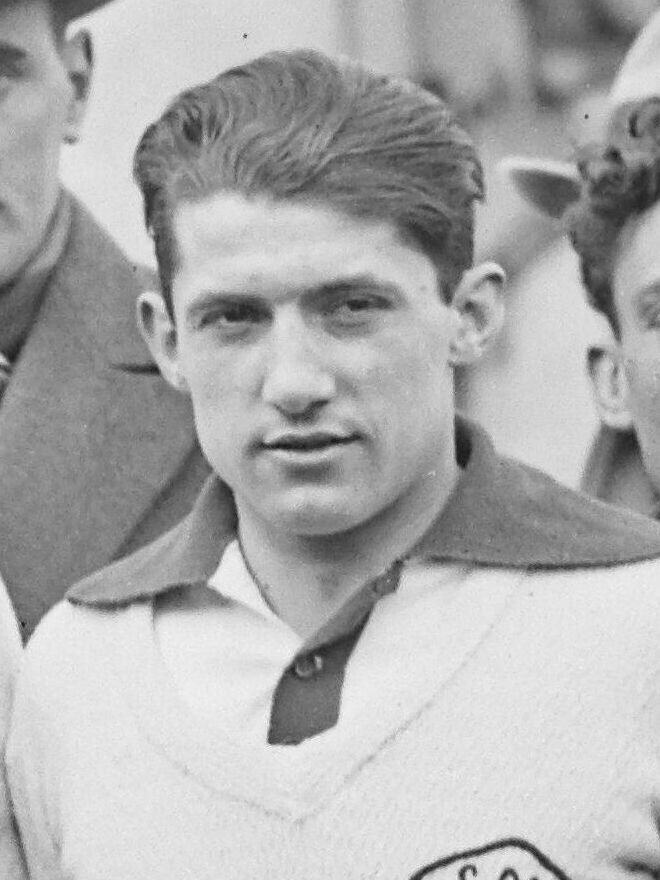
- Dupont in 1931

Personal information
- Date of birth: 5 October 1908
- Place of birth: Saint-Pons-de-Thomières, France
- Date of death: 5 May 1991 (aged 82)
- Place of death: Valleraugue, France
- Position: Midfielder

Youth career
- Bédarieux

Senior career*
Years	Team	Apps	(Gls)
1926–1929	Bédarieux FC		
1929–1932	Montpellier		
1932–1933	AS Béziers		
1933–1935	FC Sète		
1935–1937	Montpellier		
1938–1939	Revel		
- * Club domestic league appearances and goals

Yves Dupont (5 October 1908 – 5 May 1991) was a French footballer who played as a midfielder for Montpellier and FC Sète in the 1930s.

== Playing career ==
Born in the Hérault town of Saint-Pons-de-Thomières on 5 October 1908, Dupont began his football career in a modest club based in the small town of Bédarieux, from which he joined Montpellier in 1929, aged 21.

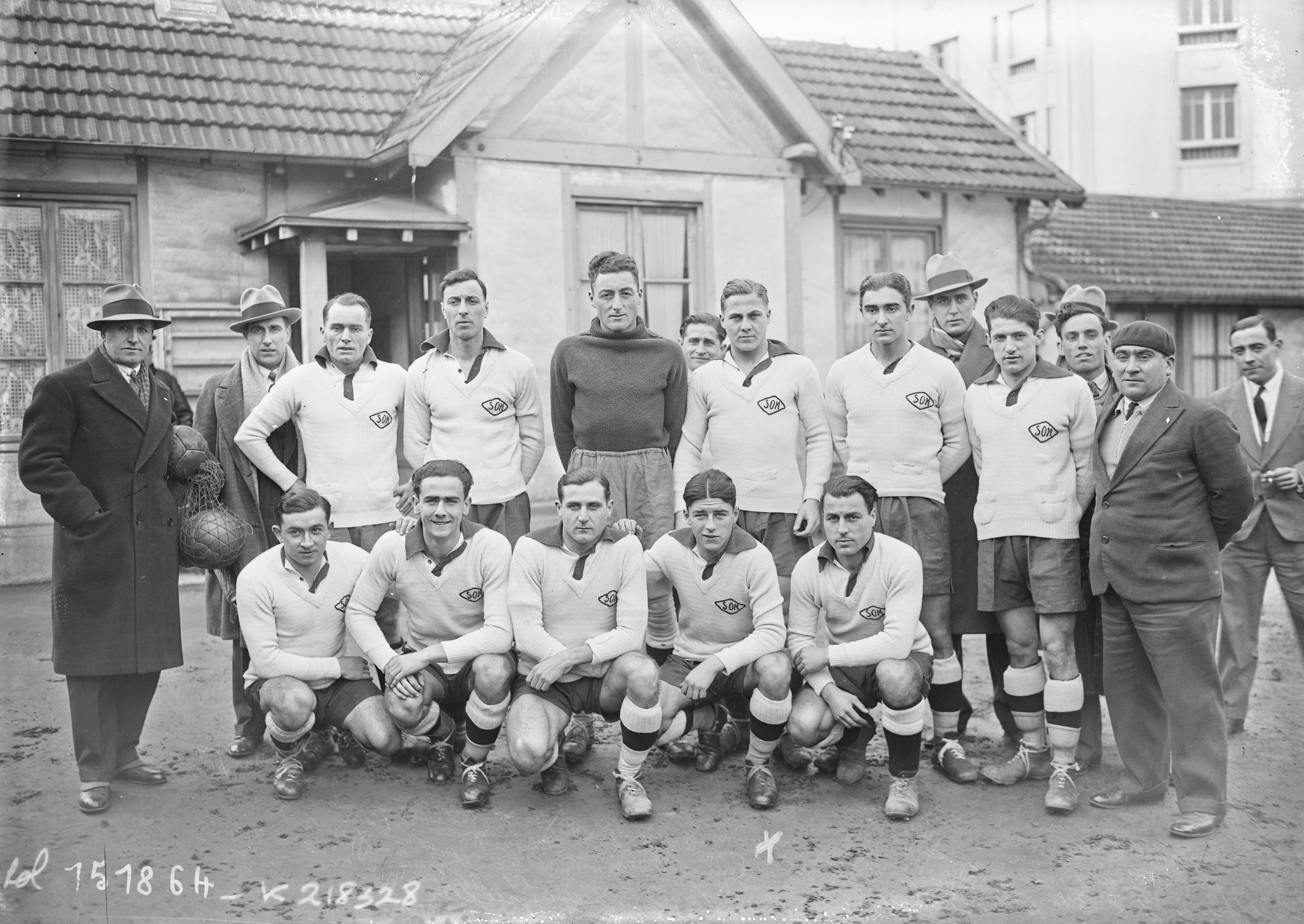
Dupont with the Montpellier team in 1931.

Together with Charles Cros, Roger Rolhion and the Temple brothers (Jacques and Pierre), he was a member of the Montpellier team that reached the 1931 Coupe de France final, which ended in a 3–0 loss to Club Français. The following day, the journalists of the French newspaper L'Auto (currently known as L'Équipe) stated that he "showed courage, but never shone; however, he marked Émile Hennequin, who was not a difficult opponent".

Dupont stayed at Montpellier for three years, from 1929 until 1932, when he moved AS Béziers. The following year, he joined Sète, whose new coach, René Dedieu, had known Dupont at SO Montpellier. In his first season at the club, Sète won the double, the 1933–34 French Division 1 and the 1933–34 Coupe de France, beating Olympique de Marseille 2–1 in the final. The following day, the journalists of L'Auto stated that Dupont, who was involved in his team's second goal, "worked with heart, with his youth and enthusiasm being communicated to their partners and particularly to the forwards". In 1938, he signed for Revel, the reigning champions of the Ligue de Midi-Pyrénées.

== Later life and death ==
In 1973, having become an inspector and departmental director of youth and sport, Dupont wrote a historical book on FC Sète titled La Mecque du football ou Mémoires d'un dauphin ("The Mecca of Football or Memoirs of a Dauphin").

Dupont died in Valleraugue on 5 May 1991, at the age of 82.

== Honours ==
Montpellier

- Coupe de France:
  - Runner-up (1): 1930–31

FC Sète

- Coupe de France:
  - Champions (1): 1933–34
- Ligue 1:
  - Champions (1): 1933–34
