= Georges Rose =

French footballer (1910–1997)

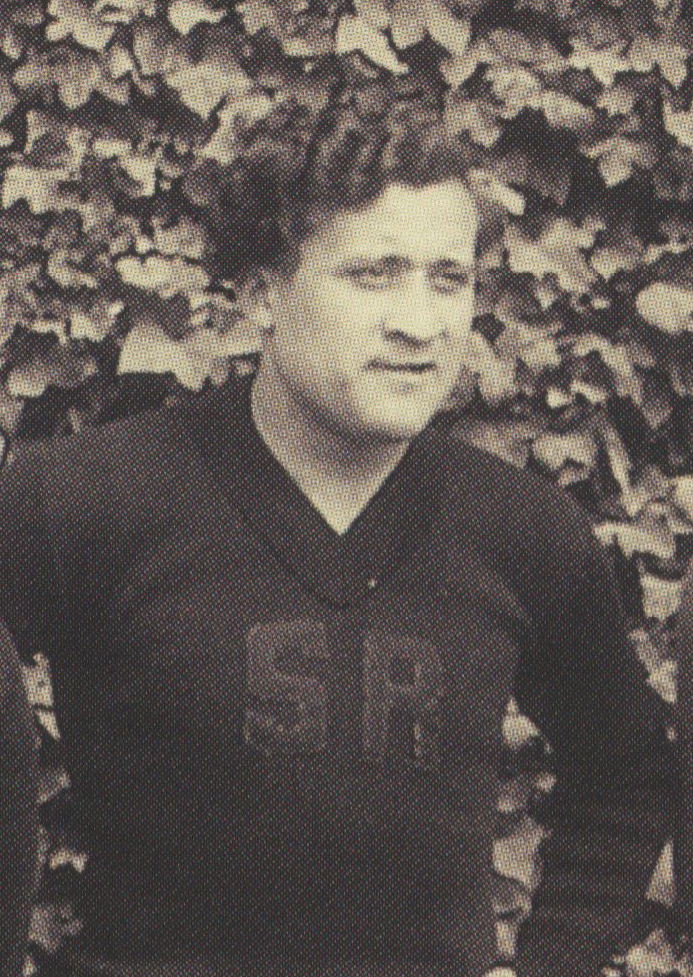

Personal information
- Full name: Georges Léon Émile Rose
- Date of birth: 30 April 1910
- Place of birth: Maisons-Alfort, France
- Date of death: 13 December 1997 (aged 87)
- Place of death: Le Port-Marly, France
- Height: 1.79 m (5 ft 10 in)
- Position: Forward

Senior career*
Years	Team	Apps	(Gls)
1929–1933	CA Paris		
1933–1936	Rennes		
1936–1937	Excelsior		
1937–1938	CA Paris		
1938–1940	Rouen		
1940–1941	Red Star		

International career
1934	France	1	(0)
- * Club domestic league appearances and goals

Georges Léon Émile Rose (30 April 1910 – 13 December 1997) was a French footballer who played as a forward for Rennes and the French national team in the mid-1930s.

== Club career ==
Born in the Paris commune of Maisons-Alfort on 30 April 1910, Rose began his career at CA Paris in 1929, aged 19, with whom he played for four years, until 1933, when he joined Rennes, where he quickly established himself as the team's captain. Together with Attilio Bernasconi, André Chauvel, and Jean Laurent, he was a member of the Rennes team that reached the 1935 Coupe de France final in Colombes, which ended in a 3–0 loss to Olympique de Marseille. In the last minutes of the match, Rose changed from full-back, his usual position, to center forward, replacing Bernasconi, with the local press noting that Rennes was a "better team" with a center-forward.

Rose stayed at Rennes for three years, from 1933 until 1936, when he moved to Excelsior, with whom he played for one season, as he then returned to CA Paris in 1937. In 1938, he signed for Rouen, where he played for two years, until 1940, when he joined Red Star, where he retired in 1941, aged 31. In total, he scored 24 goals in 132 Ligue 1 matches.

== International career ==
On 15 April 1934, the 23-year-old Rose earned his first international cap for France in a 1934 FIFA World Cup qualifier against Luxembourg at Stade Josy Barthel, helping his side to a 6–1 victory. When France was 1–0 up, he conceded a penalty after charging Théophile Speicher from behind, but Speicher then failed to convert it. The following day, the journalists of French newspaper L'Auto (the forerunner of L'Équipe) stated that "Rose still has a lot to learn at fullback", highlighting the fact that he was "not yet a professional defender". Likewise, he was never called up for the French national team again, thus being one of the 63 French internationals who never played in a friendly.

== Death ==
Rose died in Le Port-Marly on 13 December 1997, at the age of 87.

== Honours ==
Rennes

- Coupe de France
  - Runner-up: 1935
