= Laurent Henric =

French footballer (1905-1992)

Personal information
- Date of birth: 20 March 1905
- Place of birth: Argelès-sur-Mer (Pyrénées-Orientales), France
- Date of death: 3 March 1992 (aged 86)
- Position: Goalkeeper

Senior career*
Years	Team	Apps	(Gls)
1923–1929	FC Sète		
1929–1932	Cannes		
1932–1933	Olympique d'Antibes		
1933–1935	Saint-Étienne		

International career
1928–1929	France	4	(0)

Managerial career
- 1943–1944: ÉF Marseille-Provence
- 1949–1951: GSC Marseille
- * Club domestic league appearances and goals

Laurent Henric (20 March 1905 – 3 March 1992) was a French footballer and coach.

A goalkeeper, he started his playing career at his local club, FC Sète. He was an international four times in 1928 and 1929. He then joined his first professional club with AS Saint-Étienne in 1933. He was also part of France's squad for the 1928 Summer Olympics, but he did not play in any matches.

He would coach équipe fédérale de Marseille-Provence in 1943-1944 and GSC Marseille from 1949 to 1951.

== Honours ==
- Finalist of the Coupe de France in 1924 and 1929 with FC Sète
- Champion of France D1 (Group B) in 1933 with Olympique d'Antibes
