= Theatre Royal, Plymouth =

Theatre in Devon, England

Coordinates: 50.3699°N 4.1451°W

Theatre Royal Plymouth
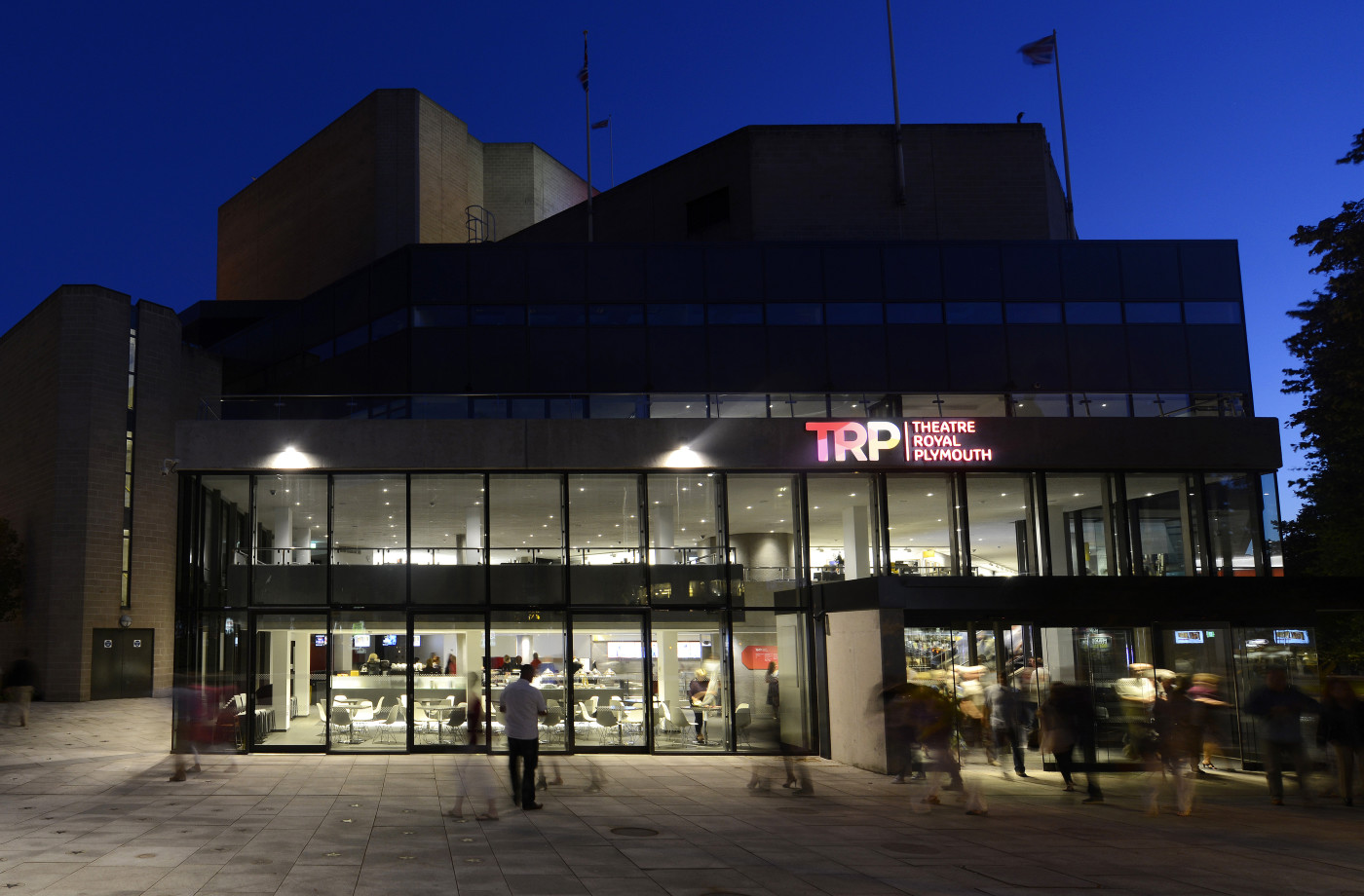
- Main entrance of Theatre Royal Plymouth
- Interactive map of Theatre Royal Plymouth
- Address: Royal Parade; Plymouth; UK
- Capacity: 1,320
- Type: Producing and Receiving House

Construction
- Opened: 1982
- Architect: Peter Moro

Website
- http://www.theatreroyal.com

TR2
- Interactive map of TR2
- Address: Cattedown; Plymouth; UK
- Type: Production and Learning Centre

Construction
- Opened: 2002
- Architect: Ian Ritchie

Theatre Royal, Plymouth, is a theatre venue in Plymouth, Devon. It consists of a 1,300-seat main auditorium, The Lyric, which regularly hosts large-scale musicals, opera and ballet; a 200-seat studio, The Drum; and a 50-seat studio, The Lab. On a separate site, Theatre Royal Plymouth also has a production and learning centre, TR2, featuring rehearsal studios and workshops for the production of set and costumes.

The theatre is a National Portfolio Organisation, receiving regular funding from Arts Council England.

A £7 million Regeneration Project was completed in September 2013 with a renovated front of house area and community performance space called The Lab.

A 7-metre-high (23 ft) bronze sculpture depicting a crouching female actor called Messenger was unveiled in front of the theatre, in 2019.

== History ==
In 1758 a theatre was built at the top of George Street in Plymouth. Originally known as the Theatre, Frankfort-Gate, it adopted the name Theatre Royal after King George III and his family visited it in 1789.

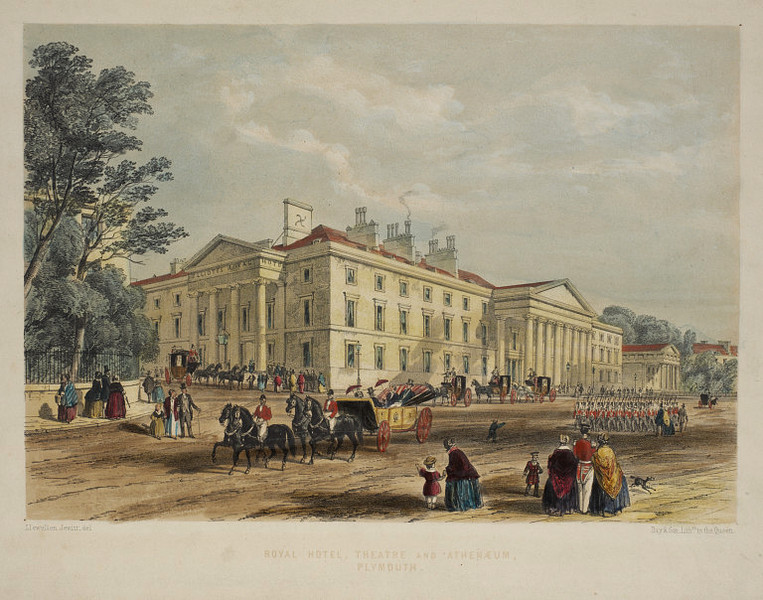
Foulston's building of 1813

In 1810 Plymouth Corporation held a competition for the design of a new theatre, hotel and assembly rooms at the bottom of George Street. The competition was won by John Foulston, who built a neo-classical block of buildings between 1811 and 1813. The new Theatre Royal opened in 1813 and could seat 1,192. Foulston's buildings formed a frontage of 268 feet (82 m) facing George's Place that was dominated by a portico with 30-foot (9.1 m)-high ionic columns. The theatre was on the west side of this portico, with the hotel and assembly rooms on the east. Foulston used thick walls to separate the auditorium from the foyer, corridors and the hotel next door to minimise the risk of fire damage. The whole inner structure was built of cast iron for the same purpose, and Foulston believed it was the only fireproof theatre in the country. Despite these precautions, the theatre suffered a disastrous interior fire in June 1878; by January 1879 it had been repaired and reopened.

The decline in theatre-going caused by the rise in cinema attendance resulted in the building being demolished in 1937. It was replaced by the 2,400-seat Royal Cinema, which opened the following year with a Compton theatre organ installed. Dudley Savage was appointed as organist, continuing for the next thirty eight years. The cinema survived the Plymouth Blitz during the Second World War, which destroyed the adjoining hotel and assembly rooms.

By 1954 the decline in cinema-going caused by the rise of television led to the cinema's being partly converted back to a theatre and rechristened as the Theatre Royal Cinema. In 1958 it was renamed the ABC Plymouth. It was converted to a triple-screen ABC which opened on 5 May 1977. ABC Cinemas passed to the Cannon Group, then to MGM from 22 May 1992. A management buy-out brought the name ABC back again in the mid-1990s. From 1 August 2006 it was operated by the independent Reel Cinemas chain. The Reel Plymouth Cinema finally closed its doors on Thursday 28 February 2019.

On a different site, the current Theatre Royal was designed in 1977 by the Peter Moro Partnership, which had already designed a number of new theatres around the country. Building started in 1979 and the theatre was officially opened on 5 May 1982 by Princess Margaret. Like several other Plymouth buildings from the post-war period the theatre is built in the brutalist style; its design has been commended and the building has been compared to the work of Denys Lasdun.

== The Lyric (the main auditorium) ==
The Lyric is the Theatre Royal's main auditorium and can accommodate approximately 1,300 people. It has a steeply raked auditorium with two galleries and a large proscenium arch. The venue hosts large-scale musicals, opera, ballet and drama.

The Theatre Royal Plymouth has also been used as a venue for televised stage productions. In 2019, The SpongeBob Musical was filmed at the theatre in front of a live audience for television broadcast. In 2021, the venue was used again for the filming of the CBeebies Christmas pantomime The Night Before Christmas, which was produced as a festive television special.

The Lyric also produces its own drama and musical productions each year, usually with commercial or subsidised partners.

== The Drum ==
The Drum (capacity – 200) specialises in the production of new plays and has a reputation for its programme. It won the Peter Brook Empty Space Award in 2007. It often collaborates with other subsidised companies and venues such as the Royal Court, ATC, the Lyric Hammersmith, the Bush Theatre, Frantic Assembly, Hampstead Theatre, Paines Plough, the Traverse Theatre and the Tron Glasgow.

== The Production and Learning Centre, TR2 ==
The Production and Learning Centre, TR2, is on the bank of the River Plym, and was designed by Ian Ritchie Architects. It contains set, costume, prop-making and rehearsal facilities. TR2 provides one of the biggest education and outreach programmes for a regional venue in the UK.
