= GC Mascara =

Algerian football club

Ghali Mascara غالي معسكر
- Full name: Ghali Club de Mascara نادي غالي معسكر
- Nickname: El-Ghali
- Founded: 1925; 101 years ago as Galia Club de Mascara
- Ground: The African Unity Stadium,
- Capacity: 22,000
- President: Benali Meriyah
- League: Ligue 2
- 2025–26: Ligue 2, Group Centre-west, 12th of 16
Home colours	Away colours

Ghali Club de Mascara (Arabic: نادي غالي معسكر) or simply GC Mascara or simply GCM for short, is an Algerian football club located in Mascara, Algeria. The club was founded in 1925 and its colours are green and white. Their home stadium, The African Unity Stadium, has a capacity of 22,000 spectators. The club is currently playing in the Algerian Ligue 2.

== History ==
The club was founded in 1925 in Mascara under the name of Galia Club de Mascara. It's one of the first Muslim teams in the French Algeria and was one of the important clubs before and after independence of the country.

The team was named Ghali Club de Mascara from 1962 to 1979 and from 1987 till now. It was also named Ghali Chabab Baladiat de Mascara (GCB Mascara) from 1977 to 1979 and Ghali Chabab Raï de Mascara (GCR Mascara) from 1979 to 1987.

== Honours ==
- Algerian Ligue 1

Champion (1) : 1984

- Oran League

Champion (1) : 1951

== Performance in CAF competitions ==
- African Cup of Champions Clubs: 1 appearance

1985 – Quarter-final

== Notable players ==
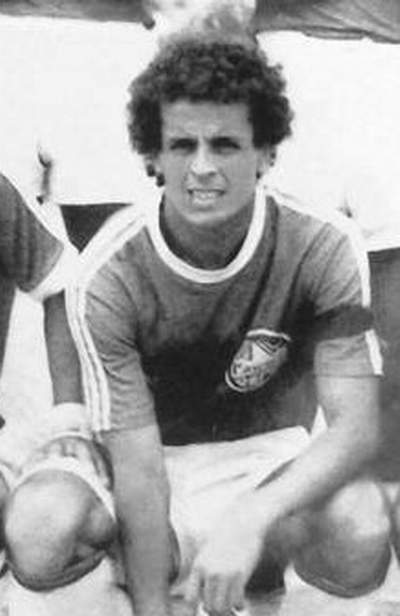
Lakhdar Belloumi with GC Mascara in 1984

Lakhdar Belloumi who is ranked amongst the top Algerian players of all time spent majority of his career with the club.

Below are the notable former players who have represented GC Mascara in league and international competition since the club's foundation in 1925. To appear in the section below, a player must have played in at least 100 official matches for the club or represented the national team for which the player is eligible during his stint with GC Mascara or following his departure.

For a complete list of GC Mascara players, see Category:GC Mascara players.

- (Algeria) Yacine Amaouche
- (Algeria) Mokhtar Baghdous
- (Algeria) Sid Ahmed Belkedrouci
- (Algeria) Lakhdar Belloumi
- (Algeria) Benbella Benmiloud
- (Algeria) Abdelkader Benzaoui
- (Algeria) Abdelaziz Bott
- (Algeria) Larbi Chaâbane
- (Algeria) Mokhtar Chibani
- (Algeria) Mokhtar El-Gotni
- (Algeria) Mohamed Henkouche
- (Algeria) Mokhtar Kechamli
- (Algeria) El-Hadi Khelili
- (Algeria) Mahi Khennane
- (Algeria) Aoued Meflah
- (Algeria) Mohamed Tayeb
- (Algeria) Abdelkader "Ghomis" Saâdoun
