= The African Unity Stadium =

Coordinates: 35°23′17″N 0°09′34″E

African Unity Stadium
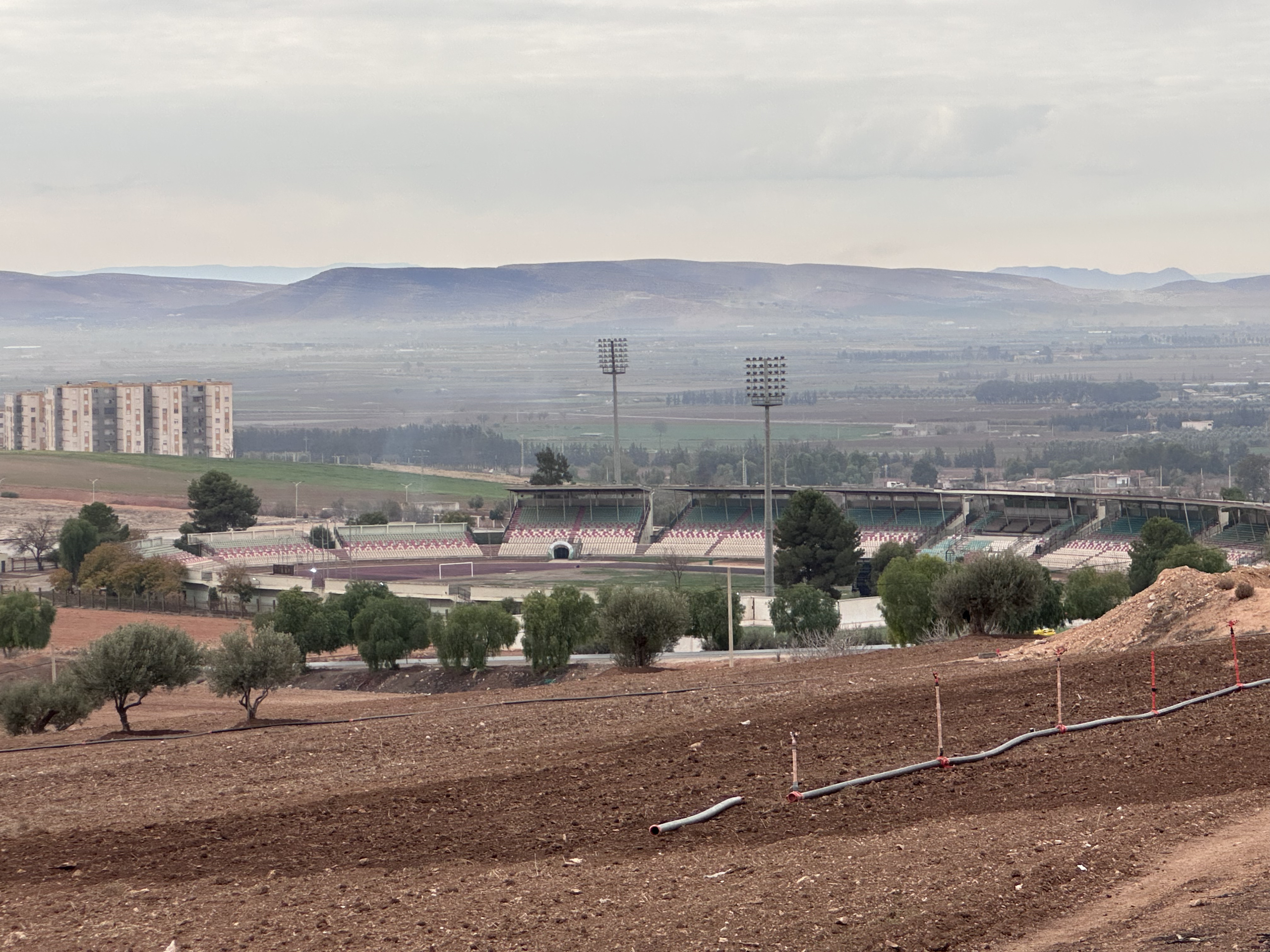
- Interactive map of African Unity Stadium
- Full name: The African Unity Stadium
- Location: Mascara, Algeria
- Owner: APC of Mascara
- Capacity: 22,000
- Surface: Grass

Construction
- Opened: 11 December 1986 (39 years ago)
- Renovated: October 2009

Tenant
- GC Mascara

The African Unity Stadium , (Arabic: ملعب الوحدة الإفريقية) is a multi-use stadium in Mascara, Algeria. It is currently used mostly for football matches and is the home ground of GC Mascara. The stadium holds 22,000 people.

== Algeria national football team matches ==
The African Unity Stadium has hosted two games of the Algeria national football team, against Ivory Coast in 1986 and USSR in 1987.

11 December 1986
--:-- UTC+1

Algeria	2–1	Ivory Coast
Menad 8'; Amani 81' (pen.)	Report	Bohé 60' (pen.)

Stade de l'Unité Africaine, Mascara
Attendance: 25,000
Referee: Koussi (Algeria)

27 May 1987
--:-- UTC+1

Algeria	0–2	USSR Ol.

Stade de l'Unité Africaine, Mascara

29 October 1988
--:-- UTC+1

Algeria	1–1	Angola
Hamrani 65'		Mavo 39'

Stade de l'Unité Africaine, Mascara
Attendance: 4,000
Referee: Bouchama (Algeria)
