= Henri Conchy =

French footballer

Personal information
- Birth name: Henri Aimé Louis Conchy
- Date of birth: 3 July 1908
- Place of birth: Sisteron, France
- Date of death: 6 May 1993 (aged 84)
- Place of death: 12th arrondissement of Marseille, France
- Position: Defender

Senior career*
Years	Team	Apps	(Gls)
1920–1925	Etoile Alpine Sisteron		
1925–1928	EP Manosque		
1928–1930	Istres		
1930–1940	Olympique de Marseille	193	(2)
1940–1943	CA Château-Gombert		
- * Club domestic league appearances and goals

Henri Aimé Louis Conchy (3 July 1908 – 6 May 1993) was a French footballer who played as a defender for Olympique de Marseille in the 1930s. His brother Max also played football for OM.

== Playing career ==
Born on 3 July 1908 in Sisteron, Provence-Alpes-Côte d'Azur, Conchy began his football career in the youth ranks of his hometown club EA Sisteron in 1920, aged 12, where he stayed for five years. In 1925, he moved to EP Manosque, with whom he played for three years. In 1928, Conchy went to Istres, remaining there for two years, until 1930, when he was signed by OM.

He was soon joined by his younger brother Max, with whom he formed a great defensive pair, which together with goalkeeper Laurent Di Lorto, formed one of the best backlines in the club's history that was partly responsible for the team's success in the mid-1930s. They finished as runner-ups in the 1932–33 French Division 1 and reached back-to-back Coupe de France finals in 1934 and 1935, losing the former to Sète (2–1), but then keeping a clean-sheet in the latter to help his side to a 3–0 win over Rennes. The following day, the journalists of the French newspaper L'Auto (the future L'Équipe) stated that "the Conchy brothers played a good match; their style is simple, but incredibly effective, and their vigor and decisiveness did not fail to influence the Rennes forwards".

Even though his brother Max left the club in 1935, OM remained a dominant side in the late 1930s, with Conchy helping his side win the Ligue 1 title in 1936–37, as well as another Coupe de France in 1938, beating Metz in the final. He remained loyal to OM for a decade, from 1930 until 1940, scoring only 1 goal in 159 league matches. After leaving OM, he played a further three seasons at CA Château-Gombert, where he retired in 1943, at the age of 35.

== Death ==
Conchy died in the 12th arrondissement of Marseille on 6 May 1993, at the age of 84.

== Honours ==
Olympique de Marseille

- Coupe de France:
  - Champions (2): 1935 and 1938
  - Runner-up (1): 1934
- Ligue 1:
  - Champions (1): 1936–37
  - Runner-up (1): 1932–33, 1937–38, and 1938–39
