= 1949–50 French Division 2 =

11th season of the second-tier football league in France

Division 2
- Season: 1949–50

Statistics of Division 2 in the 1949–50 season.

== Overview ==
It was contested by 18 teams, and Nîmes Olympique won the championship.

== League standings ==
Pos	Team	Pld	W	D	L	GF	GA	GD	Pts	Promotion or relegation
1	Nîmes Olympique	34	25	7	2	87	28	+59	57	Promoted
2	Le Havre	34	24	5	5	85	25	+60	53	Promoted
3	Cannes	34	17	7	10	65	40	+25	41	
4	Béziers Hérault	34	12	13	9	57	53	+4	37	
5	Rouen	34	13	10	11	56	45	+11	36	
6	Valenciennes	34	15	6	13	52	64	−12	36	
7	Lyon OU	34	14	7	13	48	51	−3	35	
8	Olympique Alès	34	13	8	13	52	52	0	34	
9	Amiens	34	13	7	14	55	54	+1	33	
10	Toulon	34	11	11	12	52	60	−8	33	
11	GSC Marseille	34	12	7	15	47	61	−14	31	
12	Le Mans	34	11	8	15	48	53	−5	30	
13	Besançon	34	13	4	17	46	53	−7	30	
14	AS Troyes	34	9	12	13	38	62	−24	30	
15	Angers	34	11	7	16	46	57	−11	29	
16	AS Monaco	34	11	7	16	40	53	−13	29	
17	Nantes	34	9	9	16	44	57	−13	27	
18	CA Paris	34	3	5	26	36	86	−50	11	

Source: rsssf.com
