= LOOK II (sculpture in Plymouth) =

Sculpture by Antony Gormley in Plymouth, England

- Rusty Reg
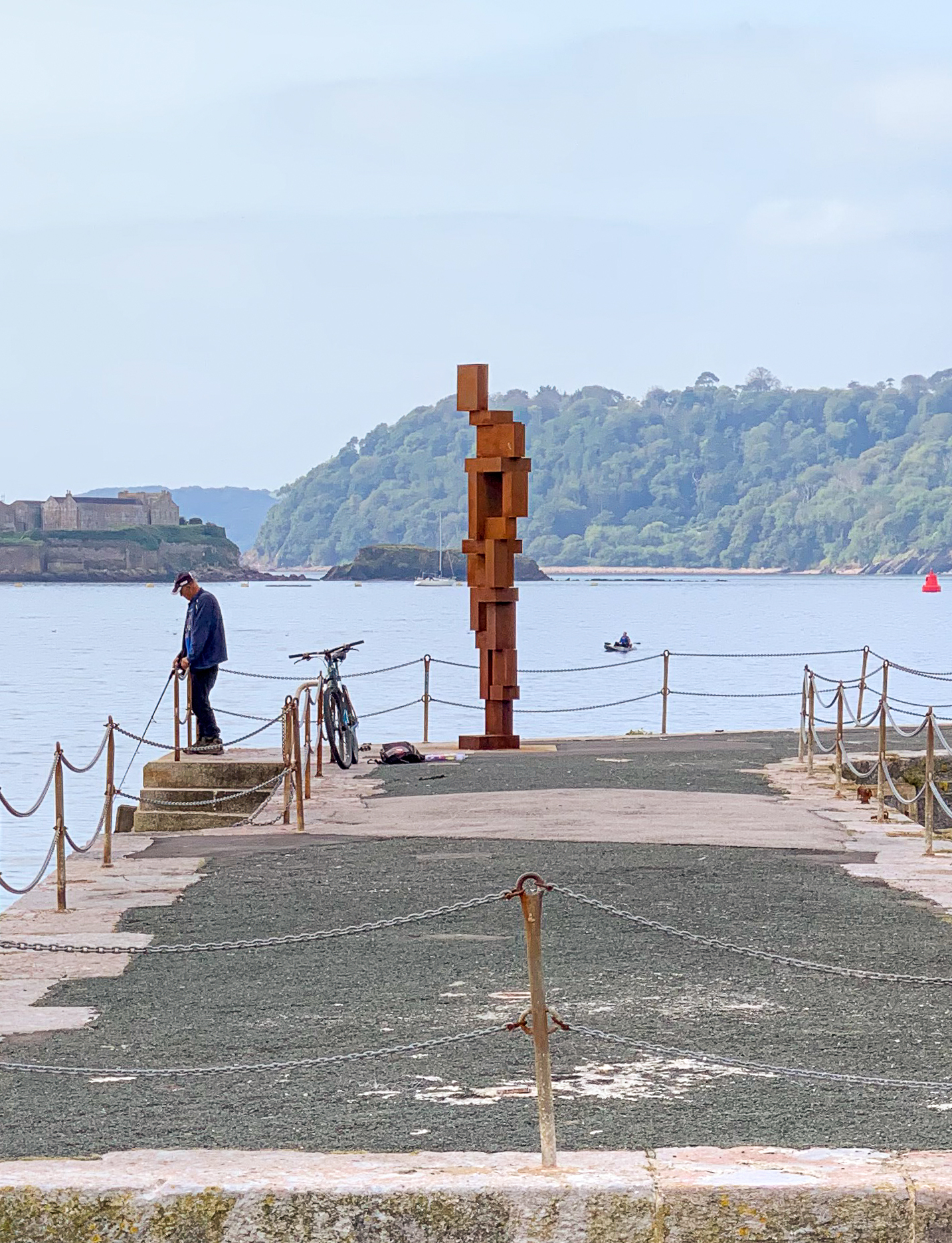
- LOOK II on West Hoe Pier, Plymouth

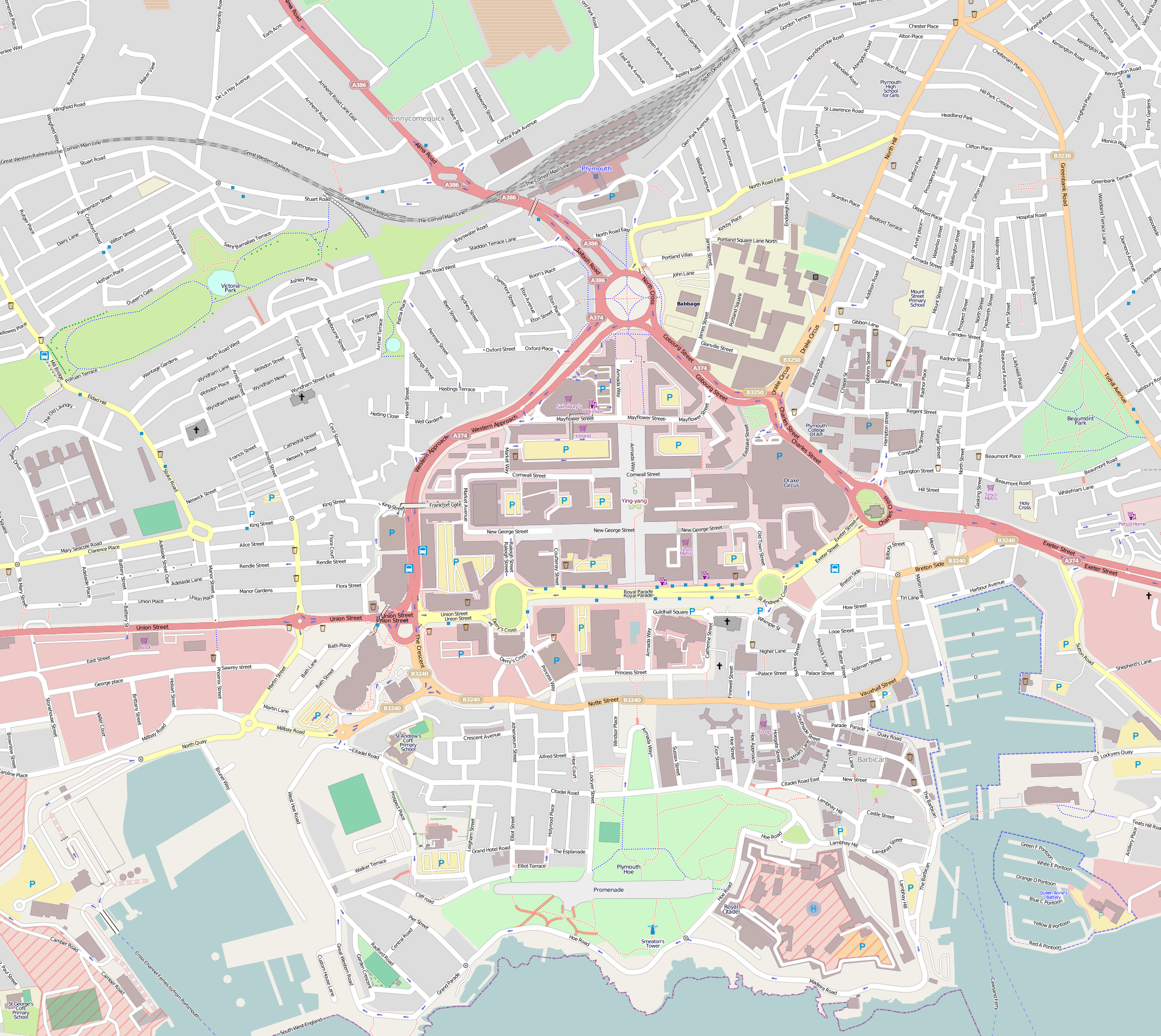
- Artist: Antony Gormley
- Year: 2020
- Completion date: 2020
- Medium: Cast iron blocks
- Dimensions: 370 cm (12 ft)
- Weight: ≈ 3 tonnes
- Location: Plymouth, England; 50.363347°N 4.146666°W
- Website: The Box website

LOOK II (alternatively, Look II, and colloquially, Rusty Reg) is a permanent sculpture by British sculptor Antony Gormley on the south-western leg of West Hoe Pier in Plymouth, England.

It was commissioned by Plymouth City Council and The Box as part of the city's Mayflower 400 celebrations. The work marks the site where Francis Chichester returned in 1967 following his circumnavigation of the globe in the Gipsy Moth IV.

== Construction ==
LOOK II is 12 feet (3.7 m) tall and made of 22 cast iron blocks weighing approximately 3 tonnes in total. It is "stacked like a house of cards, but also substantial, rather like the stones of Stonehenge".

=== Planning application ===
The application submitted for the project, 20/00190/LBC, was received by Plymouth City Council on 5 February 2020 and validated on 12 February 2020. It described LOOK II as "mounted on a fabricated steel stub of bespoke design" and "bolted to the reinforced concrete pile cap".

After two extensions of the application process (in April and June 2020), a decision to grant the planning permission was issued on 23 June 2020.

== Symbolism ==
It is Gormley's intention to "evoke the yearning to travel across the horizon in order to establish a new life in another place". Through this work, Gormley aims to "transmit our old-world admiration for the skyscrapers of New York while linking them to our megalithic past".

== Controversy ==
=== Design ===
LOOK II garnered mixed reactions from local residents. The public consultation period saw Plymouth City Council receive 23 submissions, 19 against the proposal and four in support.

During an interview in September 2020, one heckler criticised the sculpture, calling it a "waste of money".

Gormley responded to critics of LOOK II, arguing that it was "a kind of love letter to the future, to people who are not yet born or people who are just born who are asking 'what kind of life can I lead in this place'". He acknowledged that "some people say '[it's] a load of rubbish, why do we need that lump of rusty stuff right in front of our finest view of the sea', and other people say 'well, it looks like it's yearning'".

=== Expenditure ===
==== Freedom of Information Act request ====
At first, Plymouth City Council refused to disclose the total sum paid for LOOK II as it was covered by a confidentiality agreement with Gormley.

On 28 February 2020, an individual filed a Freedom of Information Act (FOIA) request to the council for "the specific cost of the Gormley statue (in terms of design, construction and installation) due to be erected on West Hoe".

On 6 March 2020, the council responded and "withheld the requested information under section 43(2) (commercial interests)" of the FOIA.

On 5 April 2020, the individual escalated the matter to the Information Commissioner's Office (ICO) who on 20 November 2020 ruled that "the Council was not obliged to disclose the requested information".

==== Plymouth City Council budget ====
In February 2021, a council budget document listing a "Mayflower 400 Monument" was unearthed, suggesting the total cost of LOOK II was £764,038. The council acknowledged that the value represented the cost incurred for "Look II and all the associated works".

Local Conservative Party councillors who had already objected to the design of the sculpture, including council leader Nick Kelly and group leader Mark Deacon, criticised the city's spending on LOOK II. In a budgetary planning meeting for 2021–22, Deacon asked, "is it really bringing value for money, since it cost three-quarters of a million pounds to install?"

In a page on its official website, the council disputed the claim that the sculpture alone costed in excess of £750,000, suggesting that the figure "included a number of projects in that area including essential strengthening works to protect West Hoe Pier against damage from the sea" and that "the sculpture did not cost £750k".

== See also ==
- Messenger (sculpture in Plymouth)
