= Mahi Khennane =

French-Algerian footballer (born 1936)

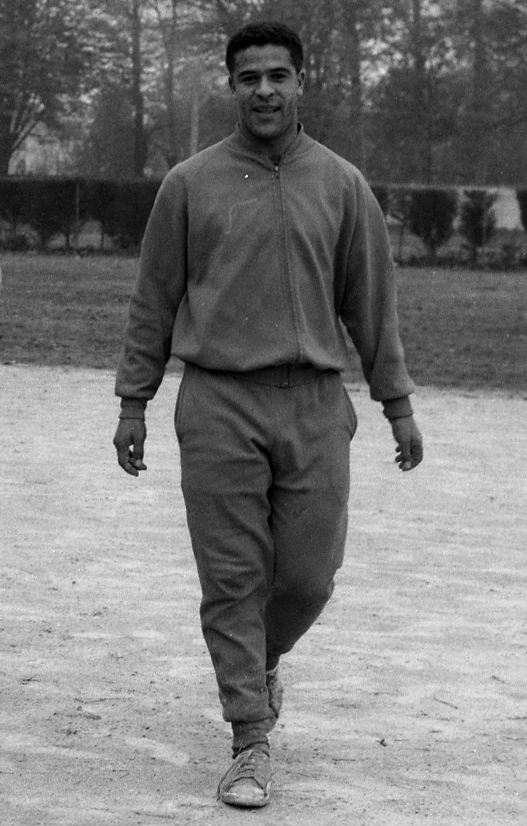
- Khennane in 1962

Personal information
- Full name: Mahi Khennane
- Date of birth: 21 October 1936 (age 90)
- Place of birth: Mascara, French Algeria
- Height: 1.74 m (5 ft 9 in)
- Position: Striker

Youth career
- GC Mascara

Senior career*
Years	Team	Apps	(Gls)
1951–1956	GC Mascara		
1956–1962	Rennes	164	(73)
1962–1965	Toulouse	61	(31)
1965–1966	Nîmes	15	(6)
1966–1967	Red Star	17	(4)
1967–1968	Lorient	16	(6)
1968–1971	GC Mascara		
1972–1973	US Saint-Malo		
1974–1978	Cormorans sportifs de Penmarch		

International career
1961	France	2	(0)
1963–1964	Algeria	3	(1)

Managerial career
- 1968–1971: GC Mascara
- 1971–1972: MC Oran
- 1972–1973: US Saint-Malo
- 1974–1978: Cormorans sportifs de Penmarch
- 1979–1981: GC Mascara
- 1982–1984: GC Mascara
- 1989–1990: GC Mascara
- * Club domestic league appearances and goals

Mahi Khennane (Arabic: ماهي خنان; born 21 October 1936) is a former footballer who represented both the France and Algeria national teams as a striker. In 1967, he was part of the first professional team of FC Lorient, before coming back in Algeria.

== Honours ==
=== Manager ===
GC Mascara

- Champion of the Algerian Championship: 1984
