= Max Conchy =

French footballer (1911–1988)

Personal information
- Birth name: Max Noël Eugène Conchy
- Date of birth: 23 October 1911
- Place of birth: Saint-Donat, France
- Date of death: 7 August 1988 (aged 76)
- Place of death: La Ciotat, France
- Height: 1.79 m (5 ft 10 in)
- Position: Defender

Senior career*
Years	Team	Apps	(Gls)
1923–1925	Etoile Alpine Sisteron		
1925–1931	EP Manosque		
1931–1935	Olympique de Marseille	66	(5)
1935–1936	Red Star		
1936–1938	Fives		
1938–1942	Olympique de Marseille	72	(4)
1942–1943	CA Château-Gombert		
1943–1944	Canet Roussillon		
1944–1945	Olympique de Marseille	1	(0)
- * Club domestic league appearances and goals

Max Noël Eugène Conchy (23 October 1911 – 7 August 1988) was a French footballer who played as a defender for Olympique de Marseille in the 1930s.

His brother Henri also played football for OM.

== Career ==
Born on 23 October 1911 in Saint-Donat, Provence-Alpes-Côte d'Azur, Conchy began his football career in the youth ranks of EA Sisteron in 1923, aged 12, where he stayed for two years, until 1925, when he moved to EP Manosque, with whom he played for six years, until 1931, when he was signed by OM.

There, he formed a great defensive pair with his older brother Henri, which together with goalkeeper Laurent Di Lorto, formed one of the best backlines in the club's history that was partly responsible for the team's success in the mid-1930s, finishing as runner-ups in the 1932–33 French Division 1, and reaching back-to-back Coupe de France finals in 1934 and 1935, losing the former to Sète (2–1), but then keeping a clean-sheet in the latter to help his side to a 3–0 win over Rennes. The following day, the journalists of the French newspaper L'Auto (the future L'Équipe) stated that "the Conchy brothers played a good match; their style is simple, but incredibly effective, and their vigor and decisiveness did not fail to influence the Rennes forwards".

Even though his brother Henri stayed in OM, Max left the club in 1935, but after short stints at Red Star (1935–36) and Fives (1936–38), he returned to OM, helping his side to a runner-up finish in the 1938–39 French Division 1. He once again lasted four years there, until 1942, but after short stints at CA Château-Gombert (1942–43) and Canet Roussillon (1943–44), he once again returned to OM, where he retired in 1945, at the age of 34. In total, he scored 7 goals in 134 league matches for OM, Red Star, and Fives.

== Death ==
Conchy died in the La Ciotat on 7 August 1988, at the age of 76.

== Honours ==
Olympique de Marseille

- Coupe de France: 1935; runner-up 1934
- Ligue 1 runner-up: 1932–33, 1938–39
