= Raoul Chaisaz =

French footballer and manager (1908–1978)

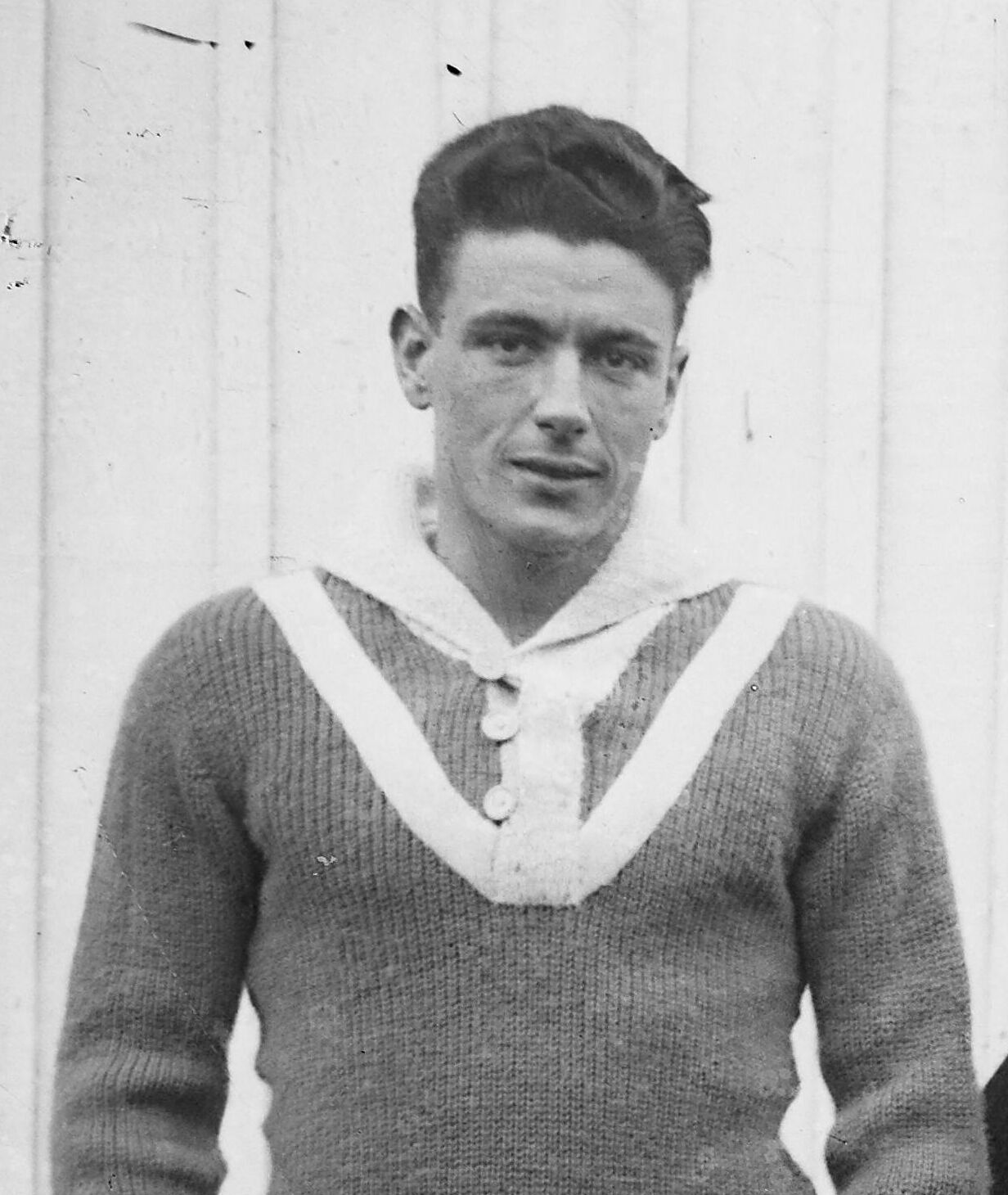
- Chaisaz in 1930

Personal information
- Date of birth: 9 August 1908
- Place of birth: Tunis, Tunisia
- Date of death: 25 November 1978 (aged 70)
- Place of death: France
- Position: Goalkeeper

Youth career
- 1920–1923: Jeune France de Tunis

Senior career*
Years	Team	Apps	(Gls)
1923–1928	Sporting Club Tunis		
1928–1929	Olympique de Marseille		
1929–1931	Club Français		
1931–1932	Stade Français		
1932–1937	Nice		
1937–1939	Antibes		

International career
1932	France	2	(0)

Managerial career
- 1939–1940: Antibes
- 1945–195?: La Semeuse Nice
- * Club domestic league appearances and goals

Raoul Chaisaz (9 August 1908 – 25 November 1978) was a French footballer who played as a goalkeeper for Nice and the French national team in the 1930s.

== Playing career ==
Born in Tunis on 9 August 1908, Chaisaz began his career in the youth ranks of Jeune France de Tunis in 1920, aged 12, with whom he played for three years, until 1923, when he joined Sporting Club Tunis, where he stayed for five years, until 1928. He then moved to France, where he played 8 matches for Olympique de Marseille in the 1928–29 season, helping his side win the 1929 Championnat Amateur. He then spent the next two seasons at Club Français, from which he joined Stade Français in 1931, with whom he played one season, until 1932, when he joined Nice, with whom he played for five years, until 1937. He then joined Antibes, where he retired in 1939, aged 31.

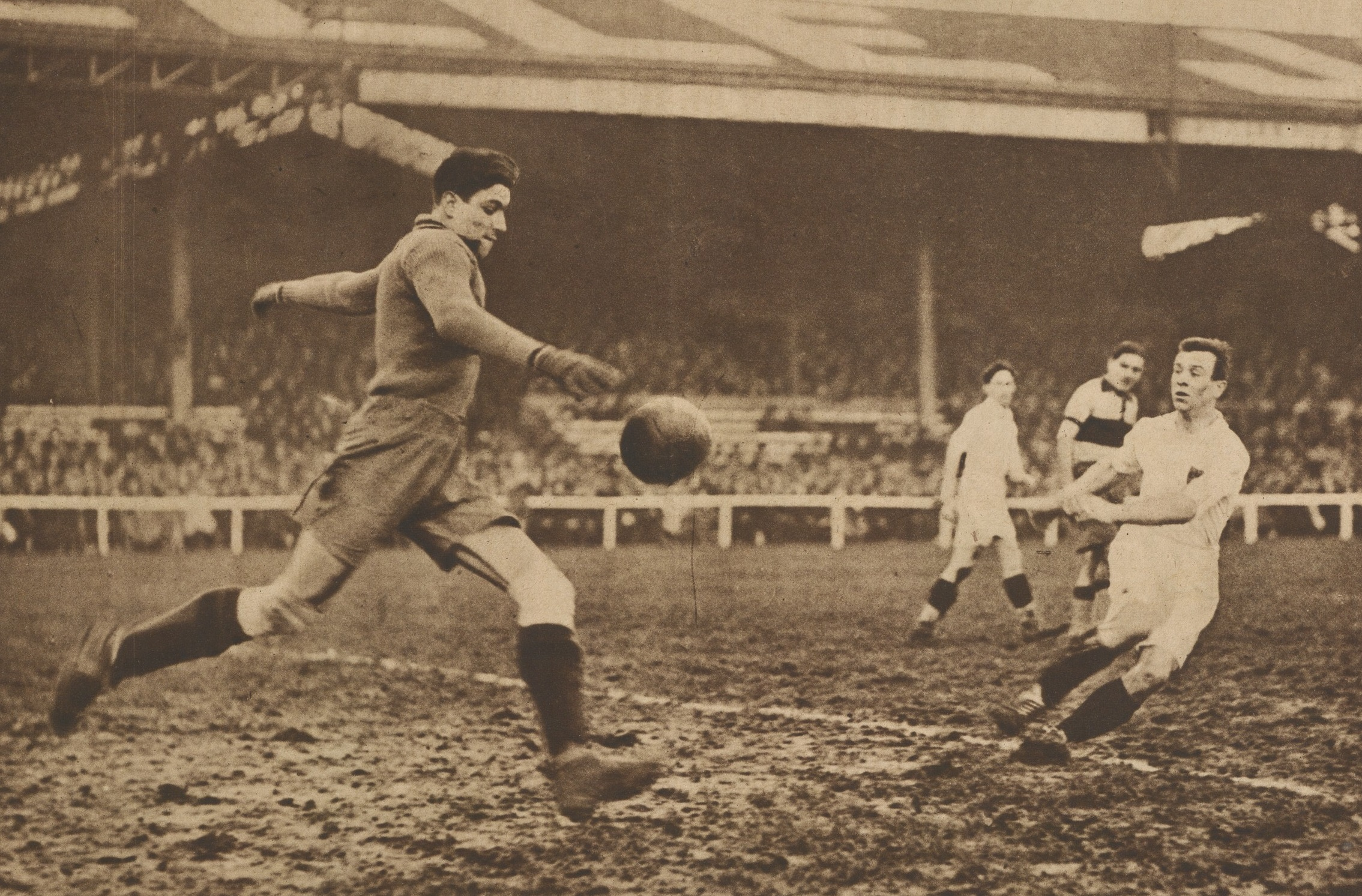
Chaisaz and Jean Sécember in 1930.

In December 1930, Chaisaz started in a Paris-Nord meeting, an annual test match for the French national team, in which he "played like a lion and established himself as a serious competitor for Thépot in the national team". He went on to earn both of his caps for France in June 1932, in friendlies against Yugoslavia in Belgrade (2–1 loss) and Bulgaria in Sofia (5–3 win), coming off the bench on both occasions to replace André Tassin. In the latter match, the replacement happened because Tassin had a split eyebrow.

== Managerial career ==
In 1945, Chaisaz was appointed coach of the football section of La Semeuse Nice, a position that he held until the early 1950s, during which he oversaw several future professionals, including a future international, Laurent Robuschi, who participated in the 1966 World Cup.

== Death ==
Chaisaz died on 25 November 1978, at the age of 70.

== Honours ==
Sporting Club Tunis

- Championnat de Tunis: 1928

Olympique de Marseille

- Championnat Amateur: 1928–29
