= Mokhtar Kechamli =

Algerian footballer and manager (1962–2019)

Personal information
- Date of birth: November 2, 1962
- Place of birth: Oran, Algeria
- Date of death: July 5, 2019 (aged 56)
- Place of death: Wilaya de Boumerdès, Algeria
- Position: Defender

Youth career
- RCG Oran
- ASM Oran

Senior career*
| Years | Team | Apps | (Gls) |
| 1980–1990 | ASM Oran | | |
| 1990–1991 | MC Oujda | | |
| 1991–1992 | MC Oran | | |
| 1992–1993 | Al-Wahda Club | | |
| 1993–1994 | Hassania US Agadir | | |
| 1994–1995 | GC Mascara | | |
| 1995–1996 | RCG Oran | | |

International career
| 1985–1988 | Algeria | 10 | (0) |
- * Club domestic league appearances and goals

Mokhtar Kechamli (November 2, 1962 – July 5, 2019) was an Algerian football manager and former footballer who played as a defender.

== Career ==
With the Algerian team, he played 10 games from 1985 to 1988. He is included in the group of 23 players at the CAN of 1986 and 1988.

== Honours ==
ASM Oran

- Algerian Cup: Runner-up 1980–81, 1982–83

MC Oran

- Algerian Championship: 1991–92
