= Laurent Robuschi =

French footballer (born 1935)

Personal information
- Full name: Laurent Robuschi
- Date of birth: 5 October 1935 (age 91)
- Place of birth: Nice, France
- Height: 1.65 m (5 ft 5 in)
- Position: Striker

Youth career
- 1948–1952: La Semeuse Nice
- 1953–1954: ASPTT Nice

Senior career*
Years	Team	Apps	(Gls)
1954–1956	Monaco	8	(4)
1956–1959	Cannes	98	(41)
1959–1967	Girondins de Bordeaux	264	(115)
1967–1968	Olympique de Marseille	26	(3)
1968–1975	Antibes		

International career
1962–1966	France	5	(0)

Managerial career
- 1971–1993: Antibes
- * Club domestic league appearances and goals

Laurent Robuschi (born 5 October 1935) is a French former football striker who played for Girondins de Bordeaux in the 1960s and was part of French national team at the 1966 FIFA World Cup. He is also the maternal grandfather of Anthony Gonzalez, known for his work in the band M83.

== Playing career ==
=== Club career ===
Born on 5 October 1935 in Nice, Robuschi began his football career in the youth ranks of his hometown club, La Semeuse Nice, in 1948, aged 13, where he was coached by Raoul Chaisaz, a former professional player from the 1930s. Due to his small height, he had a low center of gravity, being also a lively and tenacious winger with a great short pass. In 1953, he joined ASPTT Nice, but he was unable to find a breakthrough to OGC Nice, so he was sent to Monaco in 1954, where he once again had few chances, playing only 8 league matches in his two seasons there; in the latter, he scored 3 goals in as many matches to help Monaco to a 3rd-place finish in the championship.

In 1956, Robuschi joined Cannes, then in Ligue 2, where he finally established himself as an undisputed starter on the left wing, scoring 14 goals as Cannes finished 18th, although it escaped relegation in the playoffs. In the 1958–59 season, he was the team's top scorer with 21 goals, but his side finished 17th in the D2 championship, just one off from the relegation zone. His goal-scoring exploits did not go unnoticed by Girondins de Bordeaux, which signed him in 1959, and where he teamed up with the veteran Gunnar Andersson, the top scorer in OM's history, and Xercès Louis, a former international, but it was Robuschi who stood out with 21 goals, though he was once again let down by his team, which finished last in the league. Laurent played a crucial role in helping Bordeaux return to the top-flight in 1963, and in their first season back, the club finished 4th.

Robuschi was the captain of the Bordeaux team in the 1960s, scoring around 15 goals per season, with peaks of 20, but his goalscoring prowess proved insufficient to help Bordeaux win a title, finishing as league runner-ups on two occasions in 1965 and 1966, both behind Nantes, and even reached the final of the 1963–64 Coupe de France, which ended in a 2–0 loss to OL. He remained loyal to Bordeaux for eight years, from 1959 until 1967, scoring a total of 115 goals in 264 matches. He then went to Olympique de Marseille, where he was only able to score 3 goals in 26 league matches during his first season there, so he then returned to his hometown, where he found a position as a player-coach in Antibes, playing sporadically until 1975, aged 40. In total, he scored 68 goals in 189 Ligue 1 matches.

=== International career ===
On 5 May 1962, the 26-year-old Robuschi made his international debut for France in a friendly match against Italy at Florence. In total, he earned five caps for the Blues between 1962 and 1966, being a member of the French squad that participated at the 1964 European Championship and the 1966 World Cup in England.

== Managerial career ==
After his career as a player ended, Robuschi remained linked to Antibes, now as a full-time coach, a position that he held for nearly two decades, from 1975 until 1993, when he decided to retire. (Note: Some sources wrongly claim that he was the full-time manager of Antibes from 1969 until 1986, or even from 1971 until 1985.)

== Honours ==
Girondins de Bordeaux

- Ligue 1:
  - Runner-up (2): 1964–65 and 1965–66
- Coupe de France:
  - Runner-up (1): 1963–64

== See also ==
- List of longest managerial reigns in association football
