= Benbella Benmiloud =

Algerian footballer (born 1958)

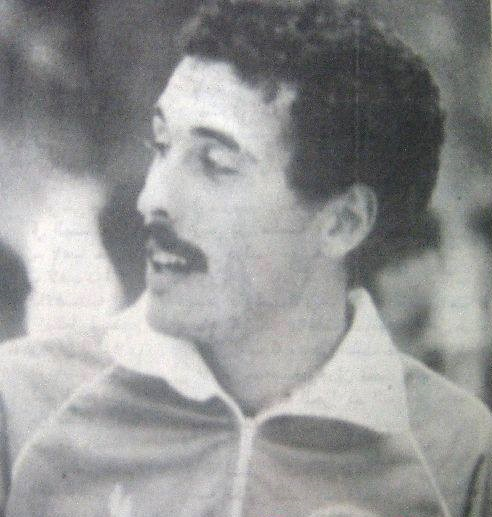

Personal information
- Full name: Benbella Benmiloud
- Date of birth: January 1, 1958 (age 68)
- Place of birth: Ouled Mimoun, Tlemcen, Algeria
- Position: Midfielder

Youth career
- CRB Ain Turk

Senior career*
Years	Team	Apps	(Gls)
1977–1980	ASC Oran		
1980–1981	CCB Sig		
1981–1986	GCR Mascara		
1986–1988	ASC Oran / A. Oran		
1988–1990	FUS Rabat		
1990–1996	Hassania Agadir		

International career
1988	Algeria	3	(0)
1989	Algeria futsal	3	(0)
- * Club domestic league appearances and goals

Benbella Benmiloud (Arabic: بن بلة بن ميلود; born 1 January 1958) is an Algerian former football player.

== Honours ==
- Algerian Championship

Champion (1): 1984 with GC Mascara
