= Aoued Meflah =

French association football player (1906–1965)

Personal information
- Full name: Benaouda Meflah
- Date of birth: May 7, 1906
- Place of birth: Mascara, Algeria
- Date of death: March 5, 1965 (aged 58)
- Place of death: Takhemaret, Tiaret, Algeria
- Position: Attacking midfielder

Youth career
- 1920–1922: FC Musulman Mascara

Senior career*
Years	Team	Apps	(Gls)
1922–1923	CCM Mascara		
1923–1924	FC Musulman Mascara		
1925–1927	GC Mascara		
1927–1929	MC Alger		
1929–1934	SC Fives		
1934–1936	Olympique Alès		
1936–1938	Stade Rennais UC	42	(14)
1938–1940	Olympique Antibes		
1940–1947	Stade Rennais UC	47	(27)
1947–1948	GC Mascara		

Managerial career
- 1947–1950: GC Mascara
- 1950–1962: AGS Mascara
- 1962–1963: FR Mascara
- 1963–1965: GC Mascara
- * Club domestic league appearances and goals

Benaouda Meflah, known by the nickname Aoued Meflah (Arabic: عواد مفلاح; May 7, 1906 – March 5, 1965) was an Algerian football player.

== Career ==
Aoued Meflah was the first Algerian and North African to play in France. He began playing football in French Algeria before moving to France to join amateur side SC Fives in 1929. He remained with SC Fives as the French league first implemented professionalism, scoring ten goals in the 1933–34 French Division 1 season.
