= Stade de l'Huveaune =

Multi-purpose stadium in Marseille, France

- Interactive map of Stade de l'Huveaune
- Location: Marseille
- Coordinates: 43°15′43″N 5°22′37″E
- Capacity: ~15,000
- Surface: Grass

Construction
- Opened: 1904
- Closed: 1998

Tenants
- Olympique de Marseille (1904–1937); GSC Marseille (1949–1951)

Stade de l'Huveaune was a multi-purpose stadium in Marseille, France. It was used mostly for football matches and was the home ground for Olympique de Marseille from 1904 to 1937. The stadium had an eventual capacity of around 15,000 spectators, and the club moved to Stade Vélodrome in 1937.
