= Messenger (sculpture in Plymouth) =

Sculpture erected in Plymouth, England

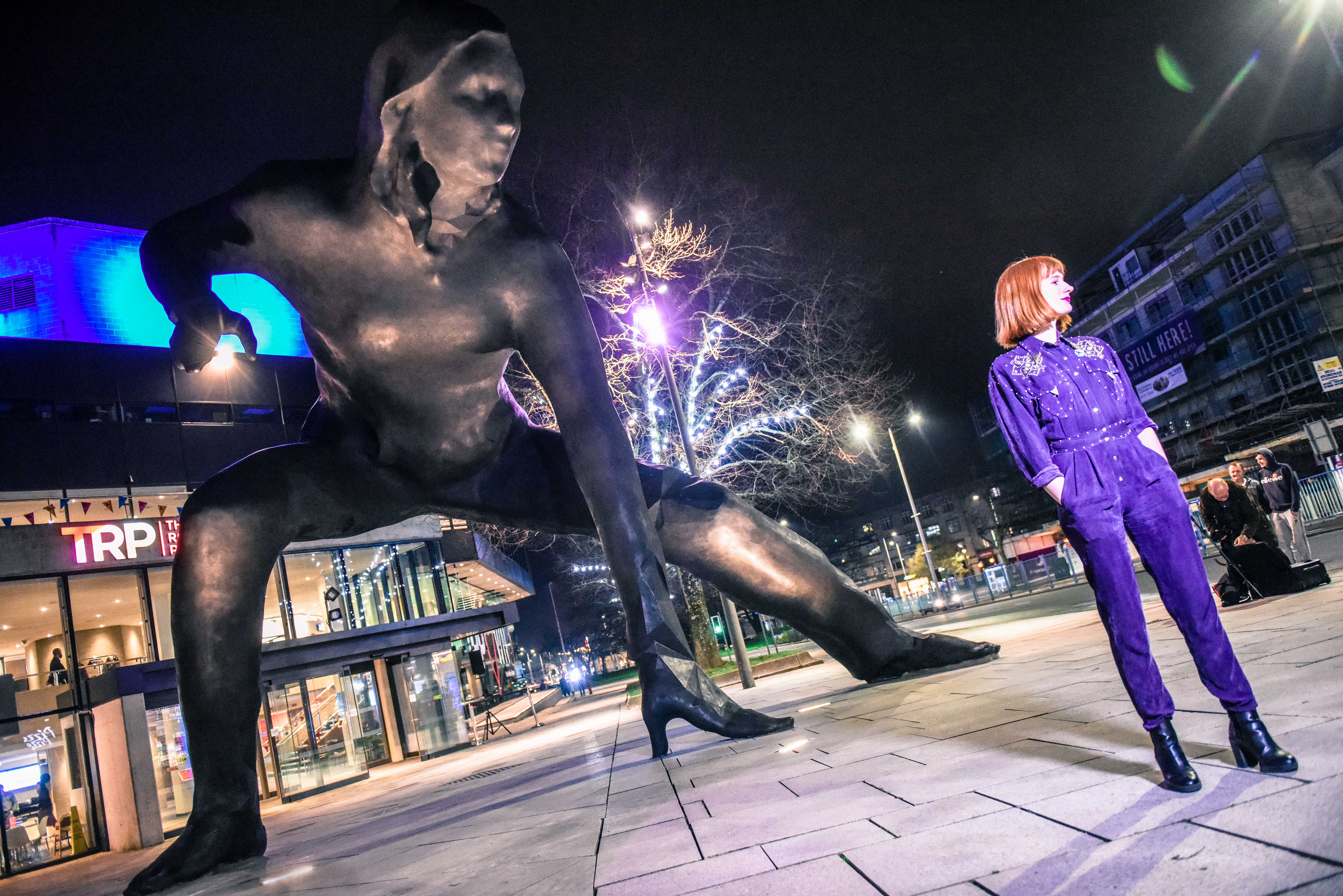
- Reveal of the Messenger statue

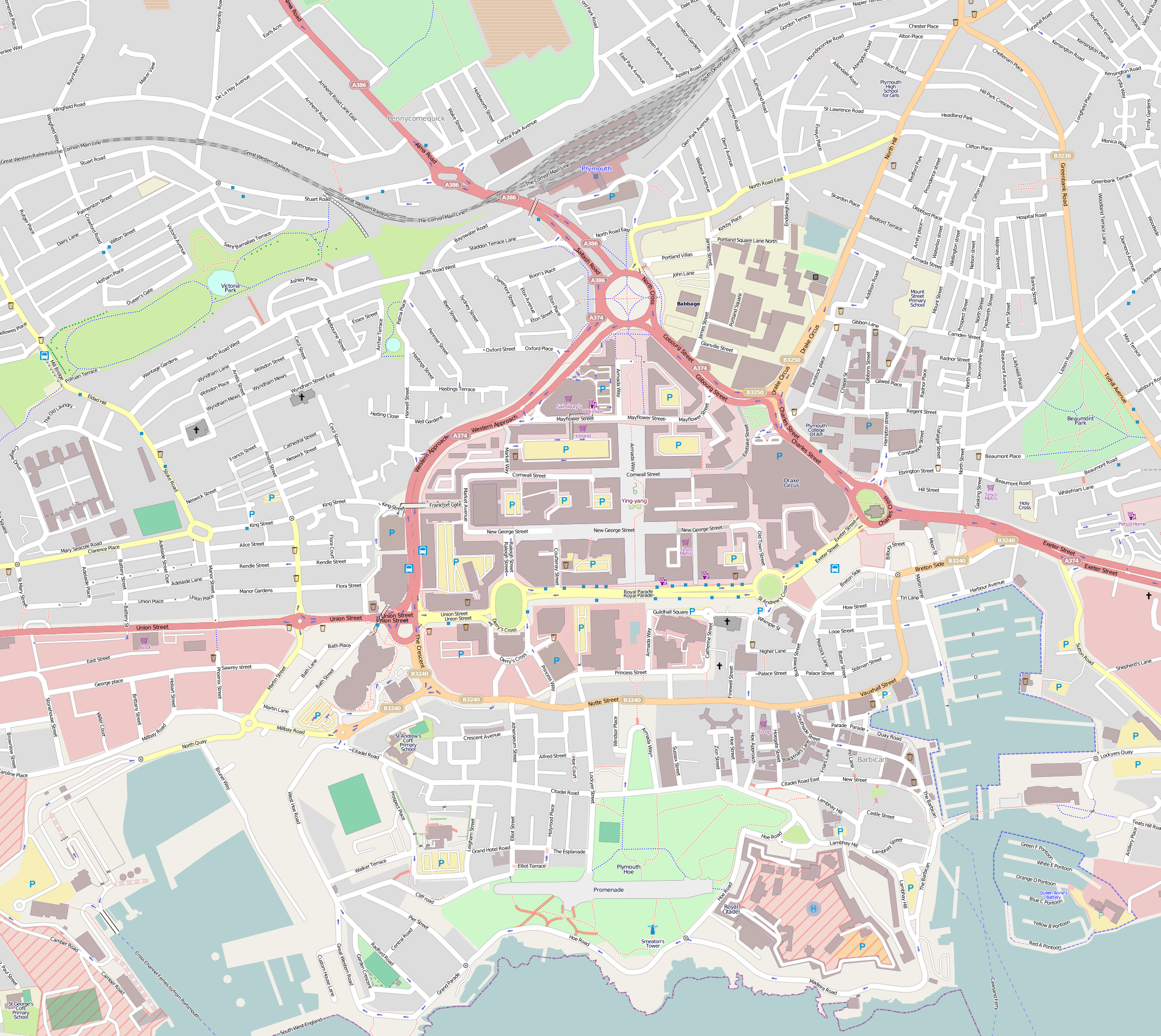
- Artist: Joseph Hillier
- Year: 2019
- Completion date: 2019
- Dimensions: 7 m × 9 m (23 ft × 30 ft)
- Weight: 10 tonnes
- Location: Plymouth, England; 50.3701°N 4.1443°W

Messenger is a large statue in Plymouth, England, created by the Cornish artist Joseph Hillier, depicting a female actor crouching in preparation to run onstage. It was commissioned by and installed outside the Theatre Royal in 2019 in preparation for the city's Mayflower 400 celebrations.

At 7 metres (23 ft) tall and 9 metres (30 ft) wide, and weighing 10 tonnes (22,000 lb), it is the largest sculpture ever created in the United Kingdom using the lost-wax casting process. It was cast over 18 months in the Castle Fine Arts foundry in Llanrhaeadr-ym-Mochnant, Wales, and delivered by barge across Plymouth Sound.

== Symbolism ==
The piece is based upon a single brief pose by a female cast member, Nicola Kavanagh, during rehearsals for a performance of the Shakespeare play Othello in 2014.

The title Messenger refers to the role of an actor in breathing life into the words of a writer. Hillier said that "There's a lot of work, a lot of graft but the biggest challenge is keeping the freshness of the original idea intact, keeping the lightness of that moment."

The sculpture is intended to be a counterpart to the many sculptures of men in Plymouth and across the UK.

Interviewed after Messenger's installation, Kavanagh said of it, "She's brave, she's not afraid. She is ready for anything that comes her way. If one little girl in Plymouth or anywhere else sees her and is inspired that would be great. There aren't that many statues of women and those that are around are passive, demure or looking beautiful. She looks like she's engaging and acting in a rebellious manner. I have two nieces, I think it's very important that little girls and little boys see women doing things – and you can't miss Messenger."

== Construction ==
The piece was commissioned as part of a £7.5 million regeneration of the theatre and it is intended that visitors will walk through its legs to enter the Theatre Royal.

== See also ==
- LOOK II (sculpture in Plymouth)
