= Jules Monsallier =

French footballer (1907-1972)

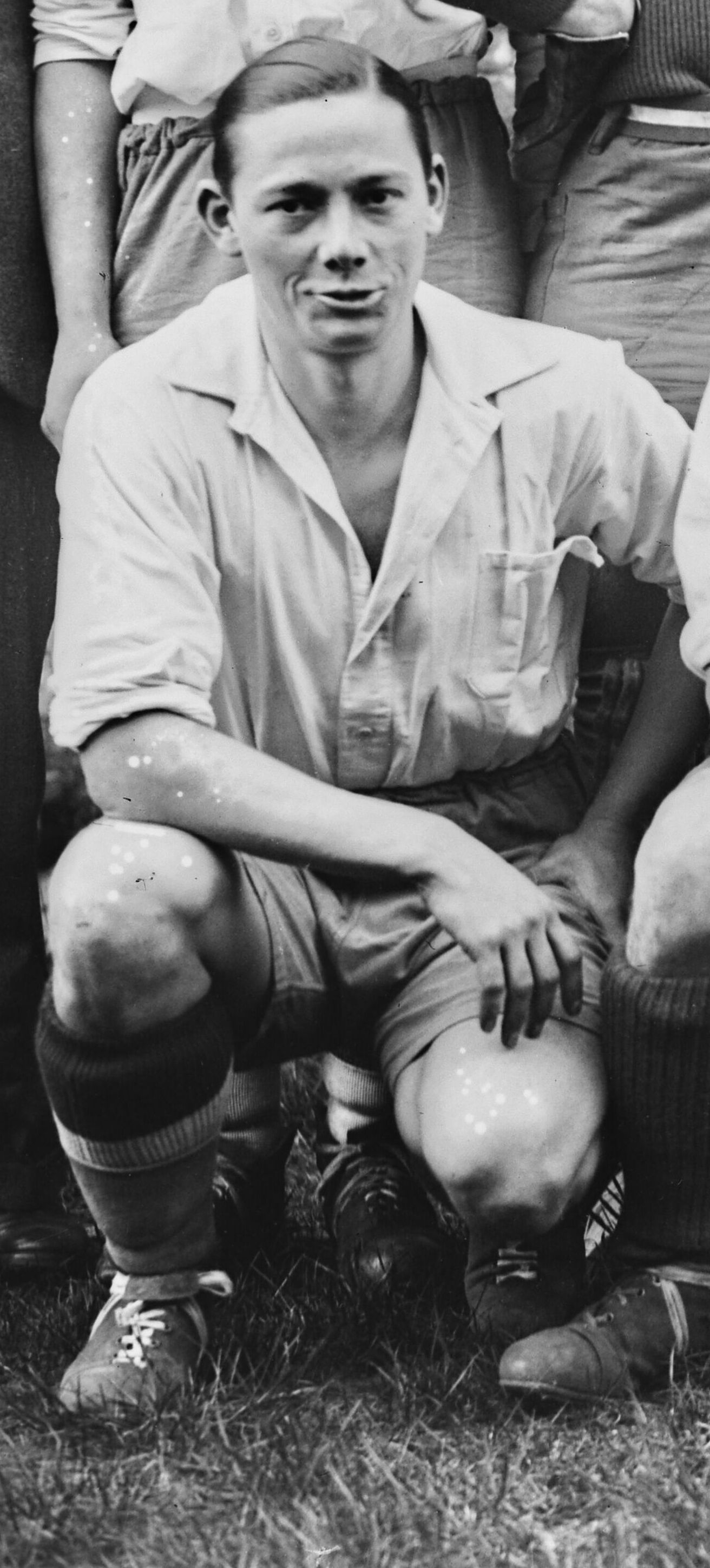

Personal information
- Date of birth: 23 January 1907
- Date of death: 4 September 1972 (aged 65)

International career
| Years | Team | Apps | (Gls) |
| 1928-1936 | France | 3 | (0) |

Jules Monsallier (23 January 1907 – 4 September 1972) was a French footballer. He played in three matches for the France national football team between 1928 and 1936.
