= GSC Marseille =

- Full name: Groupe Sporting Club Marseillais
- Founded: 1949
- Dissolved: 1951
- Ground: Stade de l'Huveaune
- Capacity: 15,000
- Manager: Laurent Henric

Groupe Sporting Club Marseillais, known as GSC Marseille was a French football club which competed in Division 2 in the 1949–50 season, as well as the Coupe de France.
