= Joseph Hillier =

British sculptor (born 1974)

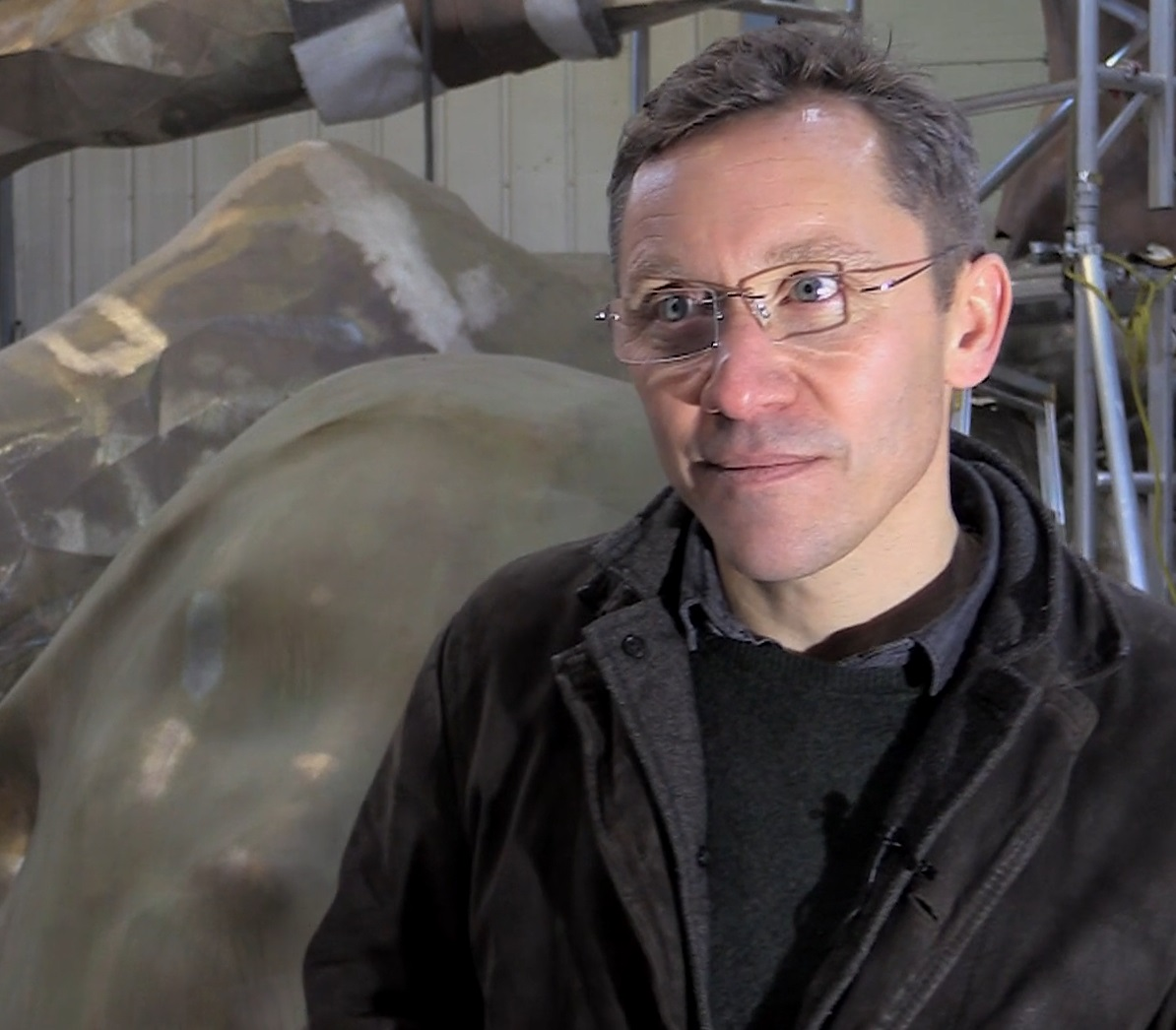
- Joseph Hillier - Messenger, 2019
- Born: Joseph James Hillier; 24 April 1974 (age 52); Truro, England
- Education: Falmouth College of Art; Newcastle University; Tulane University
- Known for: Sculpture, Public Artworks
- Notable work: Messenger
- Website: josephhillier.com

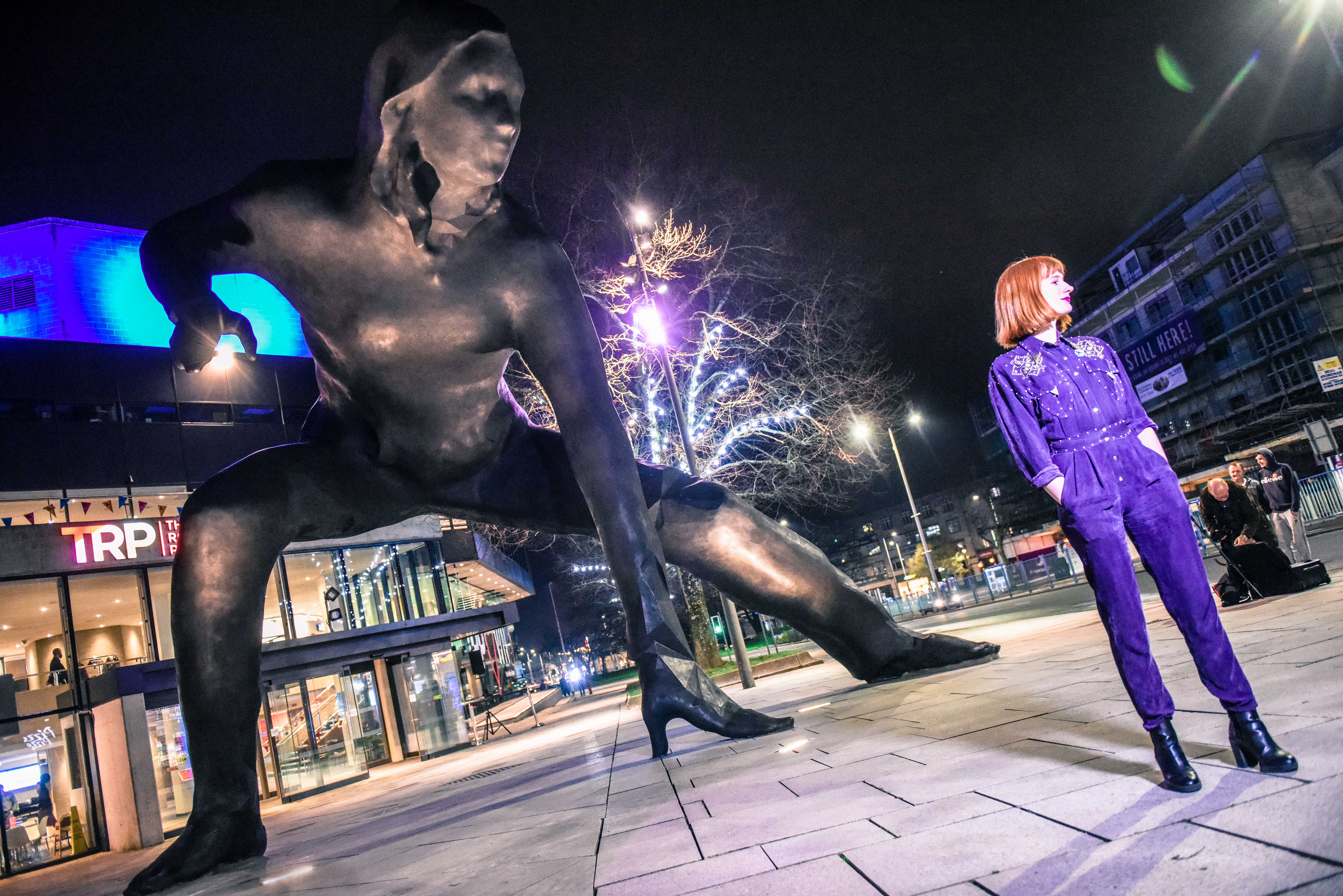
Messenger with actor Nicola Kavanagh who originated the pose in Plymouth.

Joseph Hillier (born 24 April 1974 in Cornwall) is a British sculptor. His best known works include the Messenger, a public sculpture in Plymouth, Devon.

== Early life and education ==
Hillier was born in Cornwall in 1974. He studied at Falmouth College of Art, then held a research post at Newcastle University. In 2000, he won Year of the Artist Award, from the Arts Council England. In 2001, Tulane University awarded Hillier a scholarship, leading to completion of a Master of Fine Arts in New Orleans, as well as teaching role. In 2004, he was elected associate member of the Royal British Society of Sculptors, later to become a Fellow.

== Career ==
His first works Being Human, consisting of five large art pieces, were sold to a single collection, and shipped back to the UK. This funded his first art studio in London, where he produced Generation, enabling his debut solo exhibition at APT Gallery in 2005. In 2013, his work was chosen to be a finalist in the national sculpture prize, at Broomhill, and at the Royal Academy summer exhibition.

In 2017, his most notable work Messenger, was commissioned, and erected two years later in Plymouth, Devon, March 2019.

Three of his sculptures (three monumental heads) are in the campus of Newcastle University.

== See also ==
- Lost-wax casting
