= Émile Zermani =

French footballer (1910-1983)

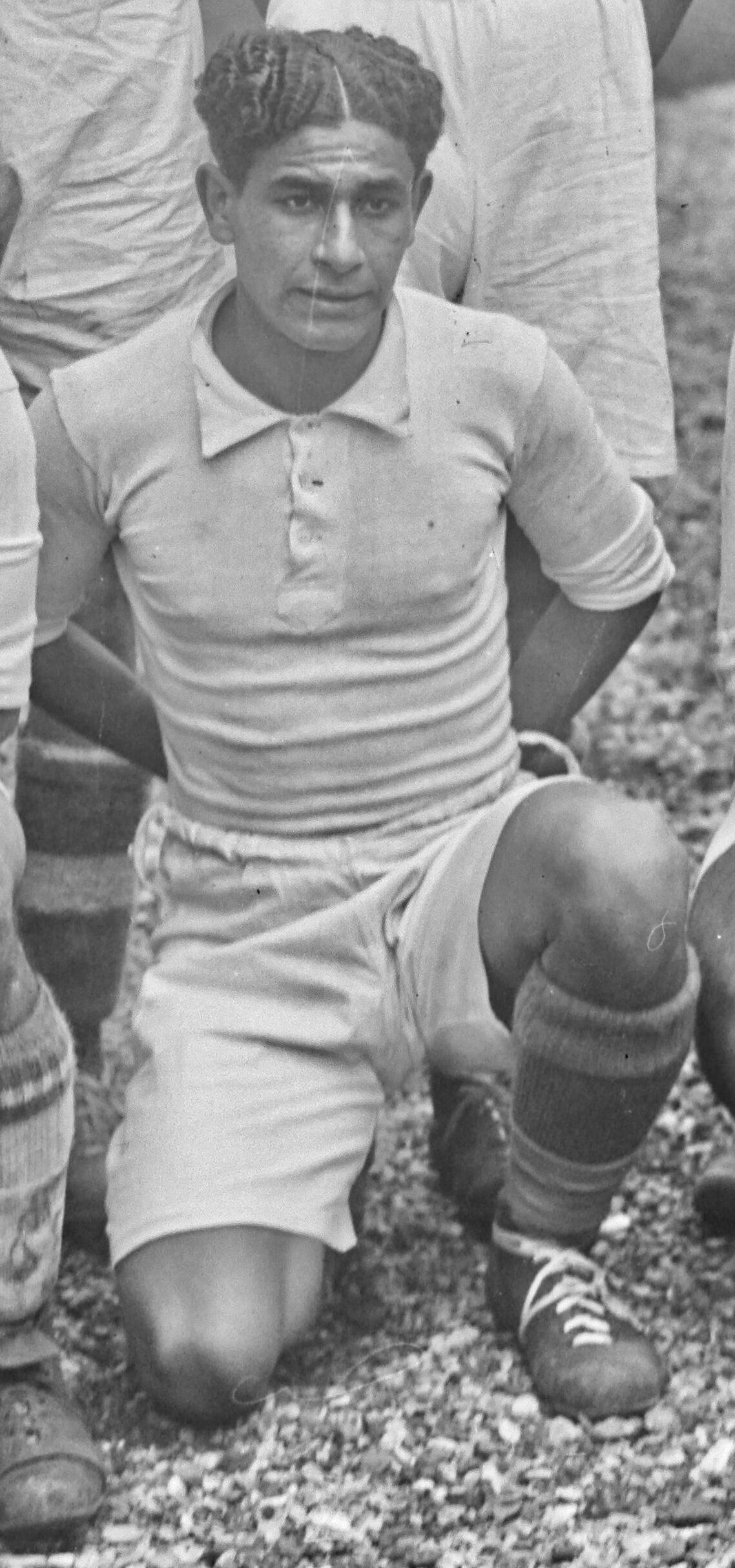

Personal information
- Full name: Émile Zermani
- Date of birth: 25 September 1910
- Place of birth: El Attaf, French Algeria
- Date of death: 10 May 1983 (aged 72)
- Place of death: Marseille, France
- Height: 1.76 m (5 ft 9 in)
- Position: Attacking midfielder

Senior career*
Years	Team	Apps	(Gls)
1932–1933	Château Gombert	?	(?)
1933–1938	Olympique de Marseille	121	(37)
1938–1939	Sporting Club Nîmois (loan)	?	(?)
1938–1939	Olympique de Marseille	17	(5)
1939–1940	FC Antibes	?	(?)
1940–1941	Sète	?	(?)
1941–1943	?	?	(?)
1943–1944	Marseille-Provence	3	(2)

International career
1935	France	1	(0)
- * Club domestic league appearances and goals

Émile Zermani (25 September 1910 – 10 May 1983) was a French football player.

He was capped once for France in 1935.

== Honours ==
- French Division 1 winner 1937
- Coupe de France (2) 1935, 1938
