= Ali Benouna =

Algerian French footballer (1907-1980)

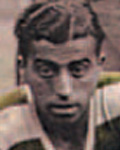

Personal information
- Date of birth: 23 July 1907
- Place of birth: Chlef, French Algeria
- Date of death: 6 November 1980 (aged 73)
- Place of death: Algiers, Algeria
- Position: Forward

Senior career*
Years	Team	Apps	(Gls)
1926–1930	GS Orléansville		
1930–1936	Sète		
1936–1938	Rennes		
1937	→ Boulogne (loan)		
1938–1939	RC Roubaix		
1939–1940	SO Montpellier		

International career
1936	France	2	(0)
- * Club domestic league appearances and goals

Ali Benouna (23 July 1907 – 6 November 1980) was a former French professional footballer.

== Career ==
Benouna was the second Algerian and North African to play in France after Aoued Meflah, playing for FC Sète and Stade Rennais in the 1930s.

He was also the first Algerian and North African to play for the France National Team, making his debut on 9 February 1936, in a 3–0 friendly loss against Czechoslovakia.

Benouna would make his second and last appearance on 8 March 1936, in a 3–0 friendly win against Belgium.

== Honours ==
- Won the Coupe de France once with FC Sète in 1934
- Has 2 caps for the France National Team
