= Attilio Bernasconi =

Argentine footballer (1905-1971)

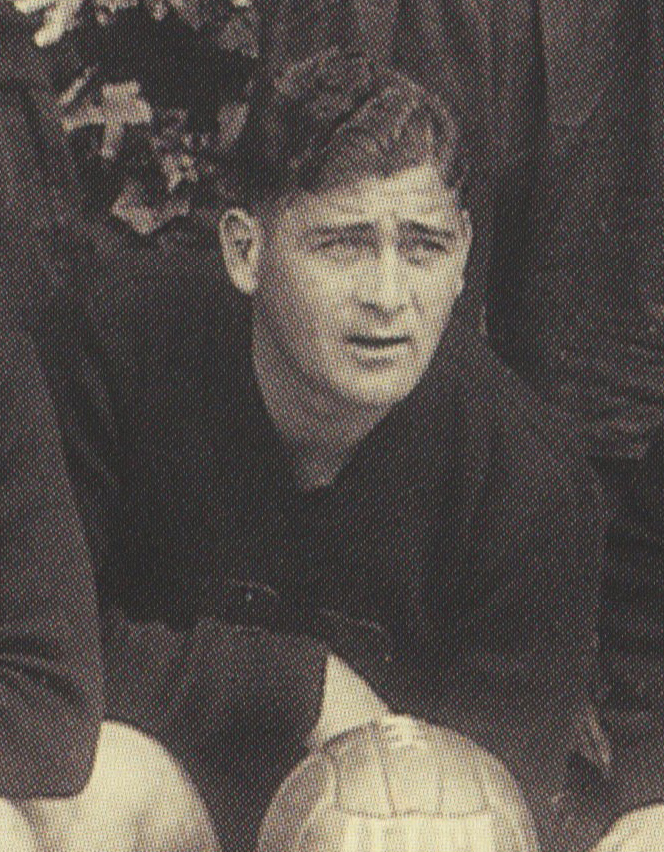
- Attilio Bernasconi in 1935

Personal information
- Date of birth: 29 September 1905
- Place of birth: Buenos Aires
- Date of death: 17 April 1971 (aged 65)
- Place of death: Orchies
- Position: Forward

Senior career*
Years	Team	Apps	(Gls)
1933–1934	Newell's Old Boys		
1934–1935	Torino F.C.		
1935–1937	Stade Rennais F.C.		
1937–1938	Olympique Lillois		
- A.S. Casale Calcio

International career
	Argentina	2	
- * Club domestic league appearances and goals

Attilio Bernasconi (29 September 1905 – 17 April 1971) was an Argentine footballer (1933–1938) who played as a forward.

== Career ==
Born in Buenos Aires, Bernasconi played as a forward for Newell's Old Boys in Argentina from 1933 to 1934, Torino F.C. in Turin, Italy from 1934 to 1935, and then moved to France where he played for Stade Rennais F.C. from 1935 to 1937 and Olympique Lillois from 1937 to 1938. Bernasconi also had a brief stint with A.S. Casale Calcio in Serie C. His professional football ended Jul 1, 1938

He had two caps playing for the Argentina national team.

He died in Orchies in northern France in 1971.
