= 1933–34 French Division 1 =

2nd season of French Division 1

Division Nationale
- Season: 1933–34

FC Sète won Division 1 season 1933/1934 of the French Association Football League with 34 points.

== Participating teams ==
- FC Antibes
- AS Cannes
- SC Fives
- Olympique Lillois
- Olympique de Marseille
- SO Montpellier
- OGC Nice
- SC Nîmes
- CA Paris
- RC Paris
- Stade Rennais UC
- Excelsior AC Roubaix
- FC Sète
- FC Sochaux-Montbéliard
Location of teams in 1933–34 Division 1

== Final table ==
Pos	Team	Pld	W	D	L	GF	GA	GAv	Pts	Qualification or relegation
1	Sète (C)	26	14	6	6	69	52	1.327	34	
2	Fives	26	13	7	6	57	31	1.839	33	
3	Marseille	26	15	3	8	69	46	1.500	33	
4	Lillois	26	14	4	8	70	40	1.750	32	
5	Excelsior	26	13	4	9	65	59	1.102	30	
6	Rennes	26	11	5	10	67	75	0.893	27	
7	Antibes	26	11	5	10	52	60	0.867	27	
8	Montpellier	26	10	6	10	53	55	0.964	26	
9	Nîmes	26	11	3	12	68	72	0.944	25	
10	Cannes	26	9	7	10	42	52	0.808	25	
11	Racing Paris	26	9	5	12	51	49	1.041	23	
12	Sochaux	26	9	4	13	60	70	0.857	22	
13	Nice (R)	26	6	5	15	42	69	0.609	17	Relegation to French Division 2
14	CA Paris (R)	26	5	0	21	55	90	0.611	10	Relegation to French Division 2

Rules for classification: Victory: 2 points, Draw: 1 point, Defeat: 0 points
(C) Champions; (R) Relegated

Promoted from Division 2, who will play in Division 1 season 1934/1935:

- Olympique Alès
- FC Mulhouse
- Red Star Olympique
- RC Strasbourg

== Results ==
Home \ Away	FCA	CAN	CAP	EAR	SCF	LIL	OM	SOM	NIC	NMS	RCP	REN	SÈT	SOC
Antibes		4–1	3–1	2–1	0–7	3–1	1–3	3–3	3–2	4–2	1–0	1–1	3–0	3–1
Cannes	1–0		3–1	1–0	0–0	2–0	1–1	3–1	2–2	1–1	6–2	0–2	4–1	4–0
CA Paris	1–3	5–1		3–6	0–1	0–3	3–1	1–4	6–1	7–0	1–4	3–6	2–3	4–6
Excelsior Roubaix	2–3	3–1	3–2		1–1	2–0	4–3	3–2	3–1	1–0	3–6	4–2	3–3	2–1
Fives	0–0	1–2	2–0	1–0		3–0	2–3	2–1	5–2	5–2	3–3	5–0	4–2	3–0
Olympique Lillois	4–0	3–1	4–1	4–2	1–1		6–1	6–2	3–0	3–1	0–0	5–4	6–0	2–2
Marseille	3–2	4–0	3–1	2–4	2–1	1–3		3–1	4–0	7–3	4–1	7–1	3–3	4–0
Montpellier	3–2	0–0	3–2	2–6	4–1	2–1	3–3		3–1	2–4	1–0	1–2	4–1	3–2
Nice	1–1	3–1	5–2	3–3	0–0	3–2	0–3	1–1		1–2	2–0	4–2	1–4	2–1
SC Nîmes	5–0	4–1	5–1	3–0	3–4	3–3	0–2	2–0	5–2		3–1	5–3	0–2	7–1
Racing Paris	5–2	5–1	4–1	3–3	1–0	1–0	0–1	3–0	4–3	1–1		2–3	1–1	0–2
Rennes	2–2	2–2	8–2	5–2	1–0	1–5	1–0	2–6	2–1	6–2	2–1		4–4	2–2
Sète	4–2	4–0	6–2	4–2	2–2	1–0	1–0	1–1	4–0	8–2	2–1	3–1		3–1
Sochaux	6–4	3–3	2–3	1–2	1–3	3–5	4–1	0–0	3–1	6–3	3–2	6–2	3–2	

Legend: Blue = home team win; Yellow = draw; Red = away team win.

== Top goalscorers ==
Rank	Player	Club	Goals
1	(Hungary) Istvan Lukacs	Sète	28
2	(Germany) Walter Kaiser	Rennes	25
3	(France) (Switzerland) Roger Courtois	Sochaux	23
4	(France) Mario Zatelli	Marseille	28
4	(Czechoslovakia) Václav Bára	Fives	28
4	(France) (Hungary) André Simonyi	Olympique Lillois	28
7	(Hungary) Karoly Kovacs	Antibes	17
8	(Hungary) Vilmos Kohut	Olympique de Marseille	16
9	(France) Ernest Libérati	Fives	15
10	(France) (Hungary) Árpád Belko	Antibes	14
10	(France) Jean Boyer	Marseille	14
10	(Czechoslovakia) Josef Silný	SC Nîmes	14
10	(France) Émile Veinante	Racing Paris	14
