= Vilmos Kohut =

Hungarian footballer

Personal information
- Full name: Vilmos Kohut
- Date of birth: 17 July 1906
- Place of birth: Budapest, Austria-Hungary
- Date of death: 18 February 1986 (aged 79)
- Place of death: Budapest, Hungary
- Position: Striker

Senior career*
Years	Team	Apps	(Gls)
1924–1933	Ferencváros	181	
1933–1939	Marseille	150	(64)
1939–1940	Nîmes		
1945–1946	Antibes		

International career
1925–1938	Hungary	25	(14)

Managerial career
- 1938–1939: Marseille
- 1939–1940: Nîmes
- 1945–1946: Antibes
- 1948: Szentlőrinci
Medal record
Representing Hungary
FIFA World Cup
Runner-up	1938 France
- * Club domestic league appearances and goals

Vilmos "Willy" Kohut (17 July 1906 – 18 February 1986) was a Hungarian footballer who played as a striker for Ferencvárosi TC, French team Olympique Marseille and the Hungary national team. Kohut got 25 caps and 14 goals for the Hungary national team between 1925 and 1938. He represented his country at the 1938 FIFA World Cup and scored one goal in two matches.

== Honours ==
- Hungarian League: 1926, 1927, 1928, 1932
- Hungarian Cup: 1927, 1928, 1933
- French Ligue: 1937
- French Cup: 1935,1938
- Mitropa Cup: 1928
- FIFA World Cup: runners-up 1938
