= István Lukács =

Hungarian footballer

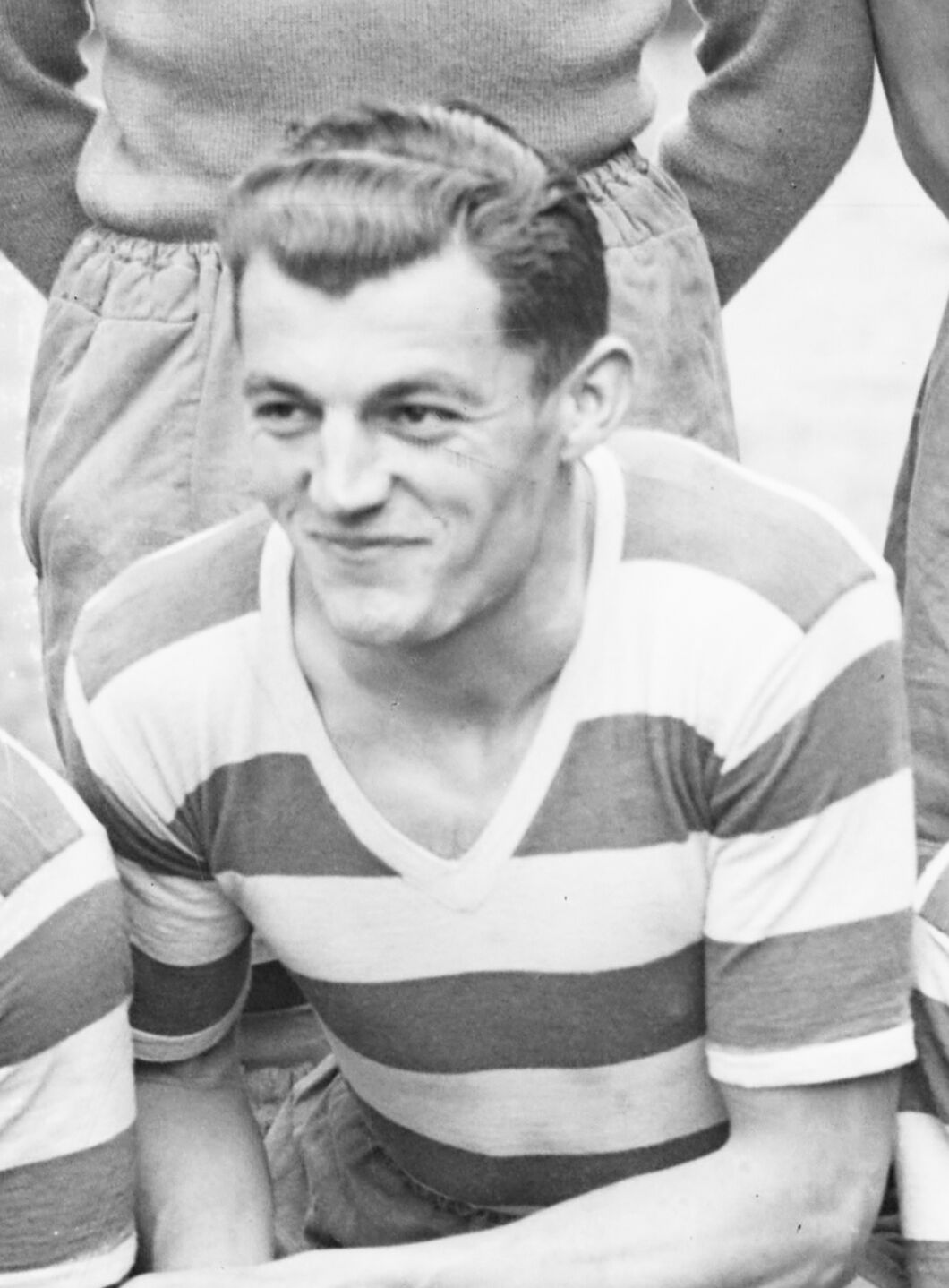
- István Lukács in 1934

Personal information
- Date of birth: 14 October 1912
- Place of birth: Austria-Hungary
- Date of death: 1960 (aged 47–48)
- Position: Striker

Senior career*
| Years | Team | Apps | (Gls) |
| 1931 | Újpest FC | 1 | (1) |
| 1933–1934 | FC Sète | | (28) |
| 1934–1936 | Olympique Lillois | | |
| 1936–1937 | Saint-Étienne | | |
| 1937–1938 | Lausanne Sports | | |
- * Club domestic league appearances and goals

István Lukács, known in French as Étienne Lukacs, (14 October 1912 – 1960) was a Hungarian professional footballer who played as a striker.

Lukács played in Hungary for Újpest FC and in France for FC Sète, Olympique Lillois, Saint-Étienne between 1933 and 1937, and was the Ligue 1 topscorer in the 1933–34 season, scoring 28 goals. Lukács later played in Switzerland for Lausanne Sports.

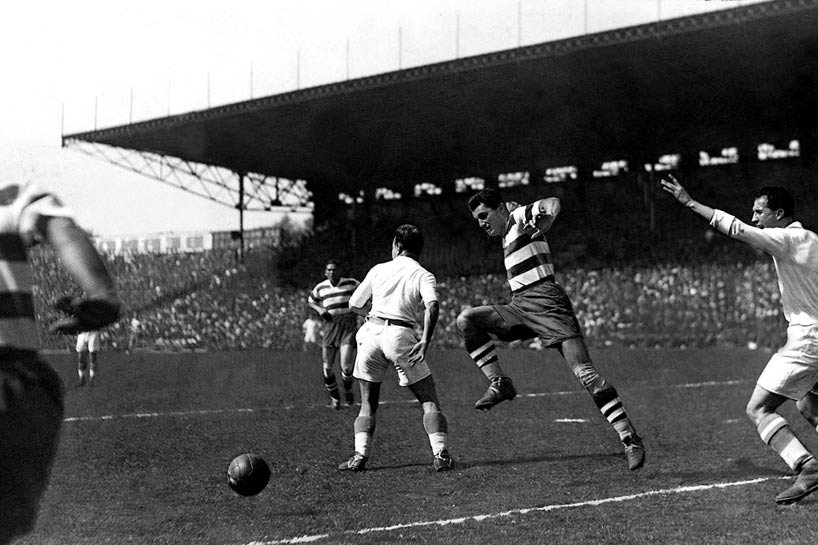
Lukács (centre) playing in the 1934 Coupe de France Final.
