= Laurent Di Lorto =

French footballer (1909-1989)

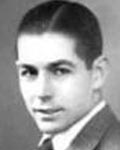

Personal information
- Full name: Laurent Di Lorto
- Date of birth: 1 January 1909
- Place of birth: Martigues, France
- Date of death: 28 October 1989 (aged 80)
- Place of death: Montbéliard, France
- Position: Goalkeeper

Youth career
- FC Martigues

Senior career*
Years	Team	Apps	(Gls)
1932–1936	Marseille	81	(0)
1936–1940	Sochaux		

International career
1936–1938	France	11	(0)
- * Club domestic league appearances and goals

Laurent Di Lorto (1 January 1909 – 28 October 1989) was a French footballer who played goalkeeper.

== International career ==
He was France's goalkeeper at 1938 FIFA World Cup. Di Lorto was the first person of Italian descent to represent the France national football team.
