= FC Antibes =

French football club

- Full name: Football Club d'Antibes
- Founded: 1912; 114 years ago
- Ground: Stade du Fort Carré, Antibes; France
- Capacity: 4,000
- League: Promotion d'Honneur (8th level)
Home colours

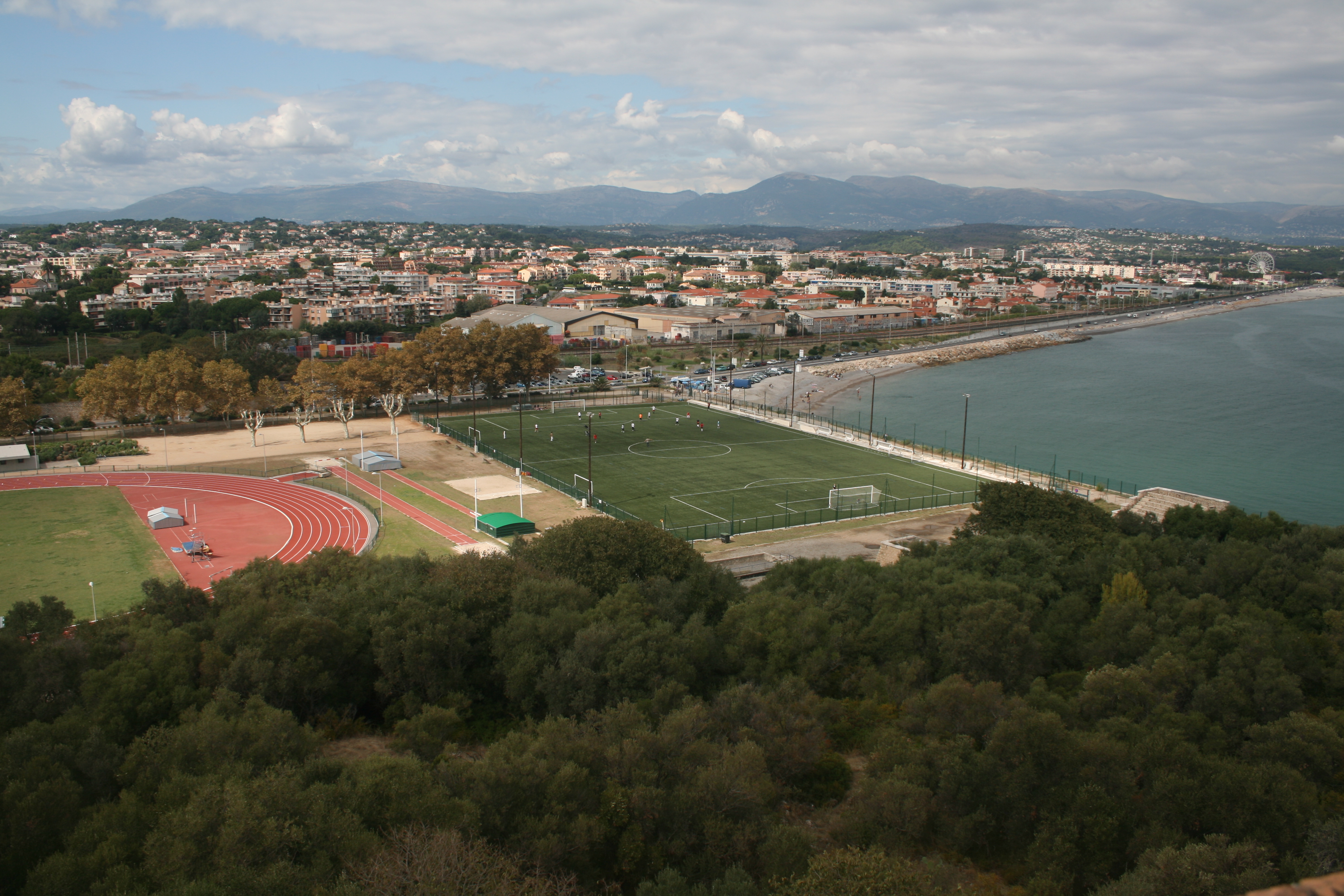
Stade du Fort Carré

Football Club d'Antibes is a French association football team based in Antibes. The team currently plays at an amateur and regional level but was part of Division 1 for 7 seasons, from its beginning in 1932 to 1939.

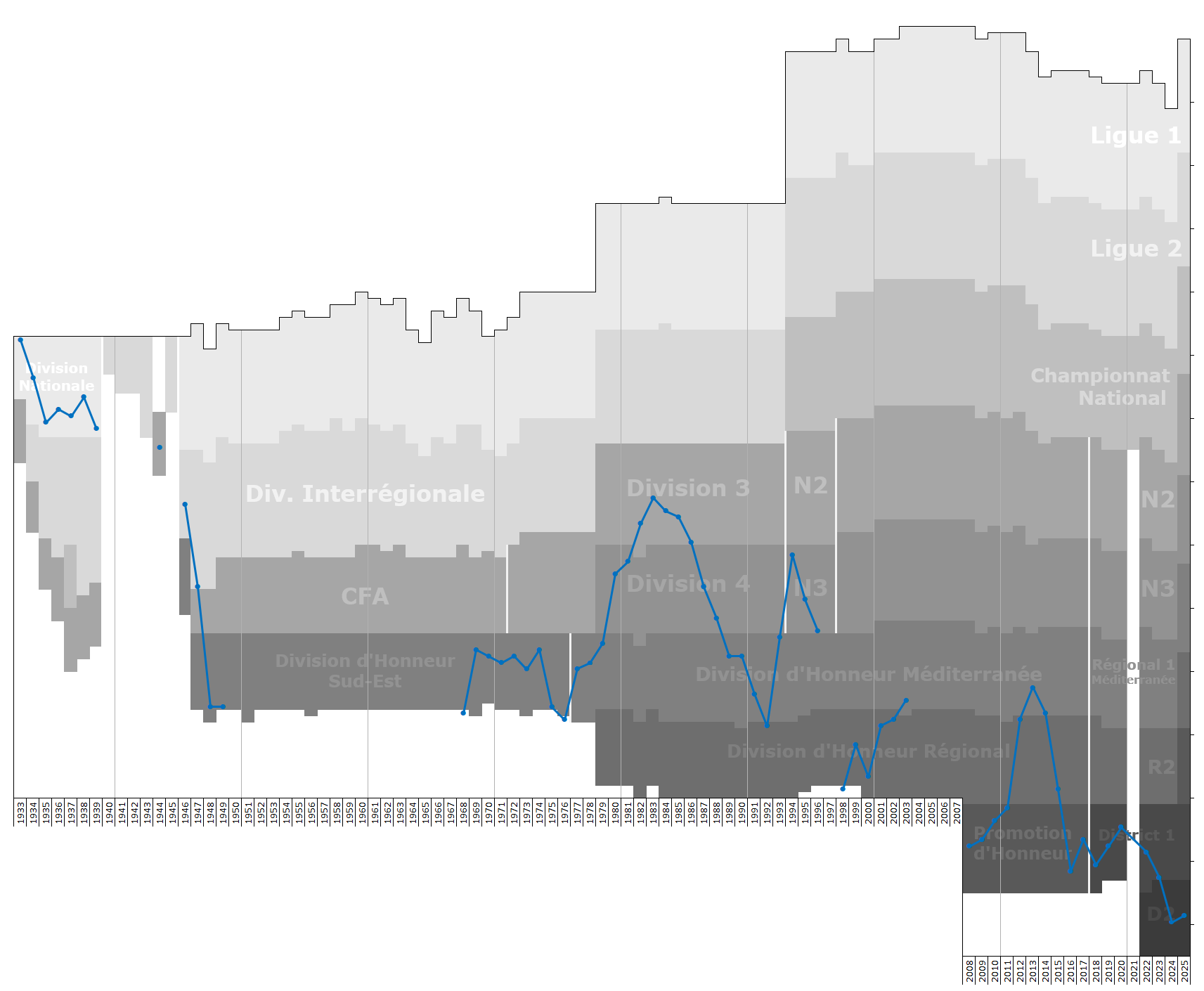
Historical league performance chart of FC Antibes

== Honours ==
- Played in Division 1: 1932–1939

== Landmarks ==
- 1912: Founded as Olympique d'Antibes
- 1932: Became a professional club and took part to the first professional football season in France.
- 1933: The team was involved in a bribery scandal and renamed Football Club d'Antibes.
- 1939: Relegation to Division 2. The club was renamed Olympique d'Antibes Juan-les-Pins.
- 1947: Relegation from Division 2 to amateur football.
- 1965–66: Merger with 2 clubs: Espérance and US Antiboise. The club assumed its current name.

== Managerial history ==
- Albert James Martin (1928–1929)
- Valère de Besveconny (1932–1933)
- Bino Scasa
- Jean Lardi (1935–1936)
- Billy Aitken (1937–1939)
- Raoul Chaisaz
- Numa Andoire (1945–1946)
- R. Cardi (1946–1947)
- Lecrublier
- Bernardi
- Laurent Robuschi (1971–1985)
- Serge Recordier (1993–1995)
- Alain Wathelet (1995–1996)
- Serge Recordier (1996–1998)
