= 1965–66 SEC Bastia season =

SEC Bastia
1965–66 season
- Manager: André Strappe; Gyula Nagy (from 12. week)
- Stadium: Stade Furiani
- Division 2: 4th (play-off)
- Coupe de France: End of 32
- Top goalscorer: League: Sadek Boukhalfa (18); All: Sadek Boukhalfa (22)
- Highest home attendance: 5,000 vs Marseille; 22 August 1965
- Lowest home attendance: 2,250 vs Grenoble; 20 March 1966
Home colours

French football club SEC Bastia's 1965–66 season. Finished fourth place in league and thus qualified to play French Division 1 play-off for promotion. Play-off matches took two wins and two defeats, and was unable rise in Division 1. Coupe de France "last 32" round was eliminated in the defeated 1–0 in Ajaccio.

== Transfers ==
=== In ===
Pos.	Name	From
Forward	(Algeria) Sadek Boukhalfa	(France) Nantes
Defender	(France) Alain Cornu	(France) Nice
Midfielder	(France) René Ferrier	(France) St. Etienne
Defender	(France) Jean-Louis Lagadec	(France) RC Paris
Forward	(France) Étienne Sansonetti	(France) Angers
Forward	(France) Marius Vescovali	(France) G. Ajaccio

=== Out ===
Pos.	Name	To
Midfielder	(France) André Strappe	Retired
Forward	(France) Gérard Moresco	(France) Ajaccio

== Squad ==
Note: Flags indicate national team as defined under FIFA eligibility rules; some limited exceptions apply. Players may hold more than one non-FIFA nationality.

No.	Pos.	Nation	Player
—	GK	FRA	Paul Orsatti
—	GK	FRA	Simon Skypczak
—	DF	FRA	Alain Cornu
—	DF	ITA	Paolo Farina
—	DF	FRA	Jean Franceschetti
—	DF	FRA	François Gandolfi
—	DF	FRA	Jean-Louis Lagadec
—	DF	FRA	Jean-Marc Vincenti
—	MF	FRA	André Baccarelli
—	MF	FRA	Jean-Jean Camadini
—	MF	FRA	Pasquin Cristofari

No.	Pos.	Nation	Player
—	MF	FRA	René Ferrier
—	MF	FRA	Jean-Claude Perfetti
—	FW	ALG	Sadek Boukhalfa
—	FW	MAR	Zahar Brahim
—	FW	FRA	Francis Muraccioli
—	FW	FRA	Jean-Jacques Padovani
—	FW	FRA	Étienne Sansonetti
—	FW	FRA	Marius Vescovali
—	FW	FRA	Joseph Viacara
—	FW	FRA	Jean-Claude Vittori

== French Division 2 ==
=== League table ===
Pos	Team	Pld	W	D	L	GF	GA	GD	Pts	Promotion or relegation
2	Olympique Marseille	36	20	8	8	58	31	+27	48	Promoted
3	Limoges	36	18	10	8	50	27	+23	46	
4	Bastia	36	18	9	9	60	46	+14	45	
5	Toulon	36	17	10	9	56	38	+18	44	
6	Avignon	36	17	9	10	68	42	+26	43	

Source: rsssf.com

=== Fixroundes & results ===
Note: 13. and 31. weeks did not match.

22 August 1965 1	Bastia	1 - 1	Marseille	Bastia, France
	Vescovali 58'		74' Joseph	Stadium: Stade Furiani; Attendance: 5,000; Referee: Debroas

28 August 1965 2	Limoges	3 - 0	Bastia	Limoges, France
	Barret 10', 86'; Wognin 82'			Attendance: 5,300; Referee: Mallereau

5 September 1965 3	Bastia	1 - 0	Angouleme	Bastia, France
	Boukhalfa 46'			Stadium: Stade Furiani; Attendance: 2,750; Referee: Rios

8 September 1965 4	Toulon	1 - 1	Bastia	Toulon, France
	Sudre 58'		56' Boukhalfa	Attendance: 7,700; Referee: Kitabjan

12 September 1965 5	Bastia	0 - 3	Boulogne	Bastia, France
	Franceschetti (red card) 45'		4' Dos Santos; 57' Casier; 78' Zimmermann	Stadium: Stade Furiani; Attendance: 3,300; Referee: Helies

18 September 1965 6	Forbach	1 - 1	Bastia	Forbach, France
	Di Tomasso 41'		23' Ferrier	Attendance: 4,000; Referee: Plaete

22 September 1965 7	Bastia	0 - 0	Beziers	Bastia, France
				Stadium: Stade Furiani; Attendance: 2,400; Referee: Bounillou

26 September 1965 8	Bastia	2 - 1	Reims	Bastia, France
	Padovani 2', 68'		78' Blanchard	Stadium: Stade Furiani; Attendance: 4,250; Referee: Eurdekian

2 October 1965 9	Grenoble	1 - 0	Bastia	Grenoble, France
	Ferrazzi 88'			Attendance: 6,600; Referee: Rios

10 October 1965 10	Bastia	2 - 0	Marignane	Bastia, France
	Boukhalfa 14', 46'			Stadium: Stade Furiani; Attendance: 2,800; Referee: Steiner

17 October 1965 11	AIX	1 - 2	Bastia	Aix-en-Provence, France
	Revelli 89'		54' Sansonetti; 85' Camadini	Attendance: 2,900; Referee: Mallereau

24 October 1965 12	Bastia	2 - 1	Cherbourg	Bastia, France
	Ferrier 14'; Vincenti 57'		8' Lion	Stadium: Stade Furiani; Attendance: 3,100; Referee: Barberan

11 November 1965 14	Bastia	0 - 0	Avignon	Bastia, France
				Stadium: Stade Furiani; Attendance: 3,000; Referee: Lamour

14 November 1965 15	Metz	4 - 3	Bastia	Metz, France
	Hess 2', 19'; J. Zvunka 47'; Niesser 88'		13' Vincenti; 62' Lagadec; 89' Sansonetti	Attendance: 3,250; Referee: Dhumereux

21 November 1965 16	Bastia	1 - 0	Montpellier	Bastia, France
	Sansonetti 57'			Stadium: Stade Furiani; Attendance: 2,400; Referee: Uhlen

28 November 1965 17	Ajaccio	1 - 3	Bastia	Ajaccio, France
	Muro 73'		13' Sansonetti; 34' Boukhalfa; 78' Lagadec	Attendance: 4,400; Referee: Mallard

5 December 1965 18	Bastia	1 - 2	Besançon	Bastia, France
	Vescovali 52'		25', 88' Liron	Stadium: Stade Furiani; Attendance: 2,350; Referee: Debroas

12 December 1965 19	Bastia	2 - 1	RC Paris	Bastia, France
	Boukhalfa 13', 89'		34' Oudjani	Stadium: Stade Furiani; Attendance: 2,800; Referee: Rios

9 January 1966 20	Bastia	1 - 2	Limoges	Bastia, France
	Perfetti 33'		64' Yansane; 71' Boucher	Stadium: Stade Furiani; Attendance: 2,350; Referee: Uhlen

23 January 1966 21	Angouleme	0 - 1	Bastia	Angouleme, France
			55' Ferrier	Attendance: 2,600; Referee: Steiner

30 January 1966 22	Bastia	1 - 0	Toulon	Bastia, France
	46' Sansonetti			Stadium: Stade Furiani; Attendance: 3,200; Referee: Schwinte

6 February 1966 23	Boulogne	2 - 1	Bastia	Boulogne, France
	Raspotnik 50', 72'		88' Camadini	Attendance: 3,000; Referee: Bondon

20 February 1966 24	Bastia	3 - 1	Forbach	Bastia, France
	Sansonetti 2'; Boukhalfa 25'; Vescovali 77'		87' Atamaniuk	Stadium: Stade Furiani; Attendance: 2,300; Referee: Petit

27 February 1966 25	Beziers	2 - 2	Bastia	Beziers, France
	Gianella 20'; Cristol 70'		12', 21' Sansonetti	Attendance: 5,050; Referee: Helies

6 March 1966 26	Reims	6 - 1	Bastia	Reims, France
	Richard 23'; Bosco 36'; Gaidoz 47'; Gori 50', 89'; Bourgeois 63'		27' Vincenti	Attendance: 8,500; Referee: Gabaye

20 March 1966 27	Bastia	3 - 2	Grenoble	Bastia, France
	Ferrier 1'; Vescovali 32', 52'		6', 82' Ferrazzi	Stadium: Stade Furiani; Attendance: 2,250; Referee: Mouton

27 March 1966 28	Marignane	0 - 1	Bastia	Marignane, France
			52' Sansonetti	Attendance: 1,300; Referee: Rios

10 April 1966 29	Bastia	3 - 0	AIX	Bastia, France
	Boukhalfa 12'; Ferrier 24'; Sansonetti 85'			Stadium: Stade Furiani; Attendance: 2,500; Referee: Passolaygne

17 April 1966 30	Cherbourg	1 - 1	Bastia	Cherbourg-en-Cotentin, France
	Guillon 90'		67' Boukhalfa	Attendance: 2,400; Referee: Suszek

30 April 1966 32	Avignon	0 - 1	Bastia	Avignon, France
			35' Boukhalfa	Attendance: 5,200; Referee: Schwinte

8 May 1966 33	Bastia	1 - 0	Metz	Bastia, France
	Sansonetti 44'			Stadium: Stade Furiani; Attendance: 2,900; Referee: Mazerand

14 May 1966 34	Montpellier	3 - 3	Bastia	Montpellier, France
	Archimbeau 23'; Aubert 46'; Marc 80' (pen.)		25' Vescovali; 61' Boukhalfa; 87' (o.g.) Aubert	Attendance: 2,500; Referee: Schwinte

19 May 1966 35	Bastia	6 - 0	Ajaccio	Bastia, France
	Vescovali 7'; Boukhalfa 12', 31', 65'; Vincenti 16'; Ferrier 43'			Stadium: Stade Furiani; Attendance: 4,450; Referee: Rios

27 May 1966 36	Besançon	1 - 1	Bastia	Besançon, France
	Turci 17' (pen.)		27' Vescovali	Attendance: 2,500; Referee: Eyroulet

4 June 1966 37	RCF Paris	2 - 8	SC Bastia	Paris, France
	Maravic 41'; Sillou (red card) 52'; Grizetti 86'		2', 28', 57' Boukhalfa; 5', 17' Padovani; 34', 89' Vescovali; 56' Sansonetti	Attendance: 1,500; Referee: Lacoste

12 June 1966 38	Marseille	3 - 0	Bastia	Marseille, France
	Joseph 20', 39'; Fiawoo (red card) 30'; Brotons 51'			Attendance: 13,200; Referee: Bois

=== Play-off the promotion French Division 1 ===
19 June 1966 1	Bastia	2 - 0	Lille	Bastia, France
	Sansonetti 29'; Boukhalfa 88'			Stadium: Stade Furiani; Attendance: 3,700; Referee: Steiner

22 June 1966 2	Nîmes	3 - 2	Bastia	Nîmes, France
	Marcellin 6'; Canetti 38'; Gomez 61'		14' Sansonetti; 53' Vescovali	Attendance: 10,000; Referee: Machin

26 June 1966 3	Bastia	3 - 0	Nîmes	Bastia, France
	Sansonetti 46', 58'; Boukhalfa 89'			Stadium: Stade Furiani; Attendance: 3,700; Referee: Tricot

29 June 1966 4	Lille	1 - 0	Bastia	Lille, France
	Stachowiach 86'			Attendance: 18,000; Referee: Kitabjan

== Coupe de France ==
19 December 1965 6. tour	Bastia	2 - 0	Le Vésinet	Toulon, France
	Sansonetti 56'; Boukhalfa 78'			Attendance: 8,100; Referee: Caryte

16 January 1966 End of 64	Bastia	3 - 2	Cazeres	Toulouse, France
	Sansonetti 43', 89'; Boukhalfa 80'		1' Barta; 67' Massip	Attendance: 2,700; Referee: Lacoste

13 February 1966 End of 32	Ajaccio	1 - 0	Bastia	Parc, France
	Moresco 70'			Referee: Dhumerelle
