= 1967–68 SEC Bastia season =

SEC Bastia
1967–68 season
- Chairman: Victor Lorenzi
- Manager: Lucien Jasseron
- Stadium: Stade Armand Cesari
- Division 2: Champion (Promoted to Division 1
- Coupe de France: End of 64
- Top goalscorer: League: Robert Blanc (13); All: Robert Blanc (13)
- Highest home attendance: 3,100 vs Angoulême (12 November 1967)
- Lowest home attendance: 1,400 vs Toulon (7 January 1968)
Home colours	Away colours

French football club SEC Bastia's 1967–68 season. Finished 1st place in league and promoted to Division 1. Top scorer of the season, including 13 goals in 13 league matches have been Robert Blanc. Was eliminated to Coupe de France end of 64.

== Transfers ==
=== In ===
- Robert Blanc from Boulogne
- Henri Borowski from Toulon
- Roland Ehrhardt from Marseille
- Franck Fiawoo from Marseille
- Claude Papi from AS Porto-Vecchio

=== Out ===
- Alain Cornu to Toulon
- Etienne Sansonetti to Ajaccio
- Sadek Boukhalfa to Metz
- Robert Traba to Béziers
- Georges Franceschetti to Cannes
- Jean-Louis Lagadec to free

== Squad ==
Note: Flags indicate national team as defined under FIFA eligibility rules; some limited exceptions apply. Players may hold more than one non-FIFA nationality.

No.	Pos.	Nation	Player
—	GK	(France) FRA	Paul Orsatti
—	DF	(France) FRA	Henri Borowski
—	DF	(Italy) ITA	Paolo Farina
—	DF	(France) FRA	Jean Franceschetti
—	DF	(France) FRA	François Gandolfi
—	DF	(France) FRA	Jean-Louis Luccini
—	DF	(France) FRA	Jean-Marc Vincenti
—	DF	(France) FRA	Joseph Viaccara
—	DF	(France) FRA	Jean-Claude Tosi
—	DF	(France) FRA	Jean-Claude Juilliard
—	MF	(France) FRA	Jean-Jean Camadini

No.	Pos.	Nation	Player
—	MF	(France) FRA	Claude Papi
—	MF	(France) FRA	René Ferrier
—	MF	(France) FRA	Hubert Zenier
—	FW	(France) FRA	Robert Blanc
—	FW	(France) FRA	Joseph Blezziri
—	FW	(France) FRA	Roland Ehrhardt
—	FW	(France) FRA	Jean-Jacques Padovani
—	FW	(France) FRA	Francis Panisi
—	FW	(France) FRA	Louis Piercecchi
—	FW	(France) FRA	Marius Vescovali
—	FW	(France) FRA	Jean-Claude Vittori

== Division 2 ==
=== League table ===
Pos	Team	Pld	W	D	L	GF	GA	GD	Pts	Promotion or relegation
1	Bastia	34	21	8	5	53	22	+31	50	Promoted
2	Nîmes Olympique	34	16	12	6	52	24	+28	44	Promoted
3	Stade Reims	34	18	7	9	60	28	+32	43	
4	Avignon	34	19	5	10	69	48	+21	43	
5	Toulon	34	16	9	9	47	40	+7	41	

Source: rsssf.com

=== Matches ===
- 19 August 1967; Dunkerque 0-1 Bastia, 3,300 att..
  - Blanc 69'

- 27 August 1967; Bastia 2-1 Grenoble, 1,700 att..
  - Blanc 26' (pen.), 59'

- 2 September 1967; Toulon 2-1 Bastia, 5,600 att..
  - Zenier 88'

- 6 September 1967; Bastia 2-0 Montpellier, 1,900 att..
  - Blanc 32' (pen.), 67'

- 10 September 1967; Bastia 0-0 Reims, 1,900 att..
  - - - - - - - - - -

- 24 September 1967; Avignon 4-0 Bastia, 3,750 att..
  - - - - - - - - - -

- 1 October 1967; Bastia 2-0 Besançon, 2,500 att..
  - Blanc 18', Zenier 38'

- 6 October 1967; Nancy 1-0 Bastia, 7,300 att..
  - - - - - - - - - -

- 11 October 1967; Battalion Joinville 0-1 Bastia, 3,700 att..
  - Papi 88'

- 14 October 1967; Chaumont 0-0 Bastia, 3,650 att..
  - - - - - - - - - -

- 22 October 1967; Bastia 3-0 Boulogne, 2,300 att..
  - Ferrier 54', Ehrhardt 74', 89'

- 29 October 1967; Limoges 1-2 Bastia, 2,300 att..
  - Papi 40', Camadini 88'

- 1 November 1967; Bastia 1-0 Nîmes, 2,600 att..
  - Blanc 30'

- 12 November 1967; Bastia 3-0 Angoulême, 3,100 att..
  - Panisi 37', Ferrier 46' (pen.), Blanc 87'

- 19 November 1967; Lorient 0-0 Bastia, 12,400 att..
  - - - - - - - - - - -

- 26 November 1967; Bastia 2-0 Béziers, 2,300 att..
  - Zenier 60', Papi 75'

- 10 December 1967; Bastia 2-0 Cannes, 1,900 att..
  - Panisi 37', Blanc 88'

- 7 January 1968; Bastia 2-1 Toulon, 1,400 att..
  - Blanc 62', Camadini 69'

- 21 January 1968; Montpellier 1-0 Bastia, 2,550 att..
  - - - - - - - - - - -

- 4 February 1968; Bastia 7-2 Avignon, 2,300 att..
  - Vescovali 4', 65', 90', Ehrhardt 66', Fiawoo 78', 89', Ferrier 88'

- 18 February 1968; Besançon 1-1 Bastia, 1,600 att..
  - Fiawoo 77'

- 25 February 1968; Bastia 2-0 Nancy, 3,200 att..
  - Fiawoo 10', Ehrhardt 85'

- 3 March 1968; Bastia 3-1 Battalion Joinville, 2,800 att..
  - Blanc 3', Ehrhardt 6', Ferrier 78' (pen.)

- 23 March 1968; Reims 1-1 Bastia, 12,700 att..
  - Blanc 6'

- 6 April 1968; Bastia 1-0 Limoges, 2,200 att.
  - Fiawoo 75'

- 14 April 1968; Nîmes 0-0 Bastia, 12,400 att..
  - - - - - - - - - - - -

- 21 April 1968; Béziers 0-1 Bastia, 2,700 att..
  - Fiawoo 55'

- 27 April 1968; Bastia 3-1 Chaumont, 2,250 att..
  - Zenier 15', 53', Fiawoo 48'

- 5 May 1968; Angoulême 2-1 Bastia, 4,200 att..
  - Fiawoo 67'

- 19 May 1968; Bastia 2-0 Lorient, 2,600 att..
  - Blanc 16', Zenier 90'

- 16 June 1968; Boulogne 2-2 Bastia, 1,000 att..
  - Fiawoo 42', Vescovali 77'

- 25 June 1968; Cannes 0-1 Bastia, 1,800 att..
  - Papi 18'

- 30 June 1968; Bastia 3-0 Dunkerque, 2,600 att..
  - Zenier 12', Fiawoo 55', 68'

- 7 July 1968; Grenoble 1-1 Bastia, 3,900 att..
  - Papi 69'

== Coupe de France ==
End of 64

- 14 January 1968; Sochaux 5-1 Bastia, 1,500 att..
  - Camadini 18'
