= 1950–51 French Division 1 =

13th season of French Division 1

Division Nationale
- Season: 1950–51

OGC Nice won Division 1 season 1950/1951 of the French Association Football League with 41 points.

== Participating teams ==
- Bordeaux
- Le Havre AC
- RC Lens
- Lille OSC
- Olympique de Marseille
- FC Nancy
- OGC Nice
- Nîmes Olympique
- RC Paris
- Stade de Reims
- Stade Rennais UC
- CO Roubaix-Tourcoing
- AS Saint-Etienne
- FC Sète
- FC Sochaux-Montbéliard
- Stade Français FC
- RC Strasbourg
- Toulouse FC
Location of teams in 1950–51 Division 1

== Final table ==
Pos	Team	Pld	W	D	L	GF	GA	GAv	Pts	Qualification or relegation
1	Nice (C)	34	18	5	11	73	46	1.587	41	
2	Lille	34	17	7	10	57	43	1.326	41	
3	Le Havre	34	18	4	12	59	43	1.372	40	
4	Reims	34	15	10	9	61	50	1.220	40	
5	Nîmes	34	16	8	10	64	53	1.208	40	
6	Bordeaux	34	14	9	11	58	49	1.184	37	
7	Saint-Étienne	34	15	7	12	63	59	1.068	37	
8	Marseille	34	11	14	9	60	46	1.304	36	
9	Strasbourg	34	14	6	14	49	58	0.845	34	
10	Roubaix-Tourcoing	34	12	8	14	55	53	1.038	32	
11	Nancy	34	13	6	15	66	66	1.000	32	
12	Sochaux	34	13	6	15	52	56	0.929	32	
13	Racing Paris	34	12	8	14	53	59	0.898	32	
14	Rennes	34	13	5	16	63	69	0.913	31	
15	Sète (O)	34	12	6	16	47	53	0.887	30	Qualification to relegation play-offs
16	Lens (O)	34	10	9	15	59	77	0.766	29	Qualification to relegation play-offs
17	Toulouse (R)	34	10	7	17	39	64	0.609	27	Relegation to French Division 2
18	Stade Français (R)	34	7	7	20	38	72	0.528	21	Relegation to French Division 2

Rules for classification: Victory: 2 points, Draw: 1 point, Defeat: 0 points
(C) Champions; (O) Play-off winners; (R) Relegated

Promoted from Division 2, who will play in Division 1 season 1951/1952

- Olympique Lyonnais: Champion of Division 2
- FC Metz: Runner-up

== Results ==
Home \ Away	BOR	LHA	RCL	LIL	OM	FCN	NIC	NMS	RCP	REI	REN	CRT	STE	SÉT	SOC	SFF	RCS	TOU
Bordeaux		0–1	4–0	1–3	0–0	3–1	2–0	2–1	0–3	2–4	1–1	2–2	1–0	4–0	3–1	4–1	3–0	3–1
Le Havre	2–2		4–1	0–1	1–0	1–1	4–1	2–4	2–0	3–0	3–1	1–0	4–1	1–0	3–1	3–0	0–1	2–2
Lens	1–1	2–1		2–1	1–1	0–2	2–0	4–2	1–1	2–1	1–2	4–4	2–3	3–0	3–1	5–0	1–1	2–2
Lille	3–0	1–0	5–0		2–1	0–0	1–3	1–0	1–1	1–1	2–0	0–1	4–3	3–1	2–1	1–1	3–1	2–0
Marseille	3–3	3–1	3–0	1–1		2–1	3–0	1–1	4–2	0–2	1–1	1–2	7–0	1–2	0–0	0–0	2–2	3–1
Nancy	2–2	6–1	4–2	1–2	5–1		1–2	3–0	0–1	0–2	3–2	2–1	4–2	2–2	3–4	2–1	2–1	0–3
Nice	4–1	0–0	5–0	4–1	2–2	5–0		2–0	3–0	1–2	3–6	3–0	0–0	2–1	2–1	5–1	4–1	2–1
Nîmes	2–2	2–3	5–3	2–4	2–1	3–0	1–1		4–2	3–0	3–0	2–1	1–0	1–0	3–3	6–2	1–0	3–1
Racing Paris	1–0	2–3	1–3	2–0	1–1	2–0	0–3	0–2		0–0	4–2	1–2	2–2	3–2	4–1	1–1	2–4	1–1
Reims	2–3	2–0	4–2	4–3	1–1	2–2	2–4	1–1	2–2		0–1	3–1	0–0	3–1	3–1	2–0	3–1	4–1
Rennes	4–2	0–4	1–2	0–0	2–1	3–5	3–1	1–2	3–4	2–2		4–1	6–0	2–0	2–1	1–3	2–4	6–0
Roubaix-Tourcoing	1–1	2–3	4–1	3–0	1–1	3–0	0–0	2–0	1–4	2–1	3–0		2–2	6–0	1–2	3–1	0–1	3–2
Saint-Étienne	1–0	1–0	4–1	5–1	1–2	3–1	3–2	1–1	2–1	1–1	3–0	3–0		0–2	3–0	3–0	1–1	4–0
Sète	1–0	1–2	1–1	1–1	3–1	2–1	2–1	1–1	5–1	5–2	1–2	2–0	4–1		1–1	2–0	2–1	0–1
Sochaux	1–0	1–0	3–2	0–4	1–2	3–3	3–2	4–0	0–1	2–0	2–2	1–1	0–2	1–0		0–1	5–0	2–1
Stade Français	1–2	1–0	2–2	0–2	2–4	1–4	0–4	2–3	0–3	1–1	6–0	1–0	4–0	3–2	0–3		0–0	1–2
Strasbourg	0–2	1–4	1–1	1–0	2–2	1–5	2–1	2–1	3–0	0–1	1–0	3–1	2–6	1–0	2–0	2–1		6–1
Toulouse FC	1–2	2–0	3–2	2–1	0–4	3–0	0–1	1–1	1–0	1–3	0–1	1–1	3–2	0–0	0–2	0–0	1–0	

Legend: Blue = home team win; Yellow = draw; Red = away team win.

== Relegation play-offs ==
Pos	Team	Pld	W	D	L	GF	GA	GAv	Pts	Qualification	RCL	FCS	BES	ROU
1	Lens	3	2	0	1	9	5	1.800	4	Qualification to French Division 1	—	1–4	2–0	6–1
2	Sète	3	2	0	1	7	4	1.750	4	Qualification to French Division 1		—	3–2	0–1
3	Racing Besançon	3	1	0	2	4	6	0.667	2	Qualification to French Division 2			—	2–1
4	Rouen	3	1	0	2	3	8	0.375	2	Qualification to French Division 2				—

Rules for classification: Victory: 2 points, Draw: 1 point, Defeat: 0 points

== Top goalscorers ==
Rank	Player	Club	Goals
1	(France) Roger Piantoni	Nancy	28
2	(France) Jean Courteaux	Nice	27
3	(France) Henri Baillot	Bordeaux	22
4	(France) (West Germany) Jean Levandowski	Lens	21
4	(France) Jean Grumellon	Rennes	21
6	(France) Jean Saunier	Le Havre	20
6	(Netherlands) Bram Appel	Reims	20
8	(France) Jean Baratte	Lille	19
9	(France) Marcel Rouvière	Nîmes	17
10	(France) Léon Deladerrière	Nancy	15
10	(Sweden) Pär Bengtsson	Nice	15
10	(France) Jean-Jacques Kretschmar	Roubaix-Tourcoing	15

== OGC Nice Winning Squad 1950-'51 ==
Goal

- (France) Robert Germain

Defence

- (France) Mokhtar Ben Nacef
- (France) Louis Broccolichi
- (France) Mohamed Firoud
- (France) Marcel Gaillard
- (France) Roger Mindonnet
- (France) Hassan M'jid
- (France) Serge Pedini
- (Sweden) Lennart Samuelsson

Midfield

- (Brazil) Yeso Amalfi
- (France) Jean Belver
- (France) Abdelaziz Ben Tifour
- (France) Désiré Carré
- (Sweden) Åke Hjalmarsson
- (France) Léon Rossi

Attack

- (Sweden) Pär Bengtsson
- (France) Antoine Bonifaci
- (France) Jean Courteaux
- (France) François Fassone
- (France) Robert Grange
- (Italy) Roberto Serone

Management

- (France) Numa Andoire (Coach)

== Attendances ==
#	Club	Average
1	Racing	21,621
2	Marseille	15,333
3	Nice	14,991
4	Girondins	14,854
5	Stade français	14,449
6	LOSC	13,626
7	Strasbourg	13,425
8	Le Havre	12,580
9	Nîmes	11,600
10	Saint-Étienne	10,846
11	Lens	9,499
12	Nancy	9,285
13	Stade rennais	9,018
14	Toulouse	8,255
15	Reims	8,208
16	Roubaix-Tourcoing	6,936
17	Sochaux	5,757
18	Sète	5,059
