= Charles Marchetti =

French footballer (1942–2018)

Personal information
- Date of birth: 17 June 1942
- Place of birth: Nice, France
- Date of death: 7 February 2018 (aged 75)
- Place of death: Nice, France
- Height: 1.74 m (5 ft 9 in)
- Position: Goalkeeper

Youth career
- Cavigal Nice

Senior career*
Years	Team	Apps	(Gls)
1960–1963	Cannes	73	(0)
1963–1966	Nice	26	(0)
1966–1968	Ajaccio		
1968–1971	Nice	78	(0)
Total		196+	(0+)

International career
1960–1964	France U21	3	(0)
- * Club domestic league appearances and goals

Charles "Charly" Marchetti (17 June 1942 – 7 February 2018) was a French professional footballer who played as a goalkeeper. He notably played for Cannes, Nice, and Ajaccio.

== Club career ==
Marchetti began his career at Cavigal Nice in his hometown of Nice. From 1960 to 1963, he played in the Division 2 for Cannes. In 1963, he signed for Division 1 club Nice. At the end of the 1963–64 season, the club suffered relegation to the Division 2, but was promoted back up in 1965 after winning the 1964–65 Division 2. Marchetti signed for Ajaccio in 1966 before returning to Nice two years later. With the club, he would go on to win the Division 2 in the 1969–70 season and the Challenge des Champions in 1970. Marchetti retired in 1971, having made 137 appearances in all competitions for Nice across his two spells at the club.

== Personal life and death ==
Charles had a son with his wife Annie.

Near the end of his career, Marchetti was a goalkeeping coach for youngsters of Cavigal Nice, his former club. He would later become the president of former players of Cavigal. In 2010, a stadium in the Saint-Roch neighborhood of Nice was named after Marchetti. In 2016, politician Éric Ciotti awarded Marchetti a trophy to honour his career.

Marchetti died on 7 February 2018, at the age of 75, due to a sickness. Nice-born politicians Éric Ciotti and Christian Estrosi notably paid homage to him. Following Marchetti's death, OGC Nice announced that their UEFA Europa League home match against Lokomotiv Moscow on 15 February 2018 would be dedicated to him.

== Honours ==
Nice

- Division 2: 1964–65, 1969–70
- Challenge des Champions: 1970
