= 1963–64 French Division 1 =

26th season of French Division 1

Division Nationale
- Season: 1963–64

AS Saint-Étienne won Division 1 season 1963/1964 of the French Association Football League with 44 points.

== Participating teams ==
- Angers SCO
- Bordeaux
- RC Lens
- Olympique Lyonnais
- AS Monaco
- FC Nantes
- OGC Nice
- Nîmes Olympique
- RC Paris
- Stade de Reims
- Stade Rennais UC
- FC Rouen
- AS Saint-Étienne
- UA Sedan-Torcy
- Stade Français FC
- RC Strasbourg
- Toulouse FC
- US Valenciennes-Anzin
Location of teams in 1963–64 Division 1

== Final table ==
Pos	Team	Pld	W	D	L	GF	GA	GD	Pts	Qualification or relegation
1	Saint-Étienne (C)	34	18	8	8	71	48	+23	44	Qualification to European Cup preliminary round
2	Monaco	34	17	7	10	62	45	+17	41	
3	Lens	34	17	6	11	71	46	+25	40	
4	Lyon	34	15	9	10	58	53	+5	39	Qualification to Cup Winners' Cup first round (Note: Lyon qualified for 1964–65 European Cup Winners' Cup as winners of the 1963–64 Coupe de France.)
5	Toulouse	34	13	11	10	56	54	+2	37	
6	Valenciennes	34	14	7	13	49	39	+10	35	
7	Bordeaux	34	13	8	13	55	58	−3	34	Invited to Inter-Cities Fairs Cup
8	Nantes	34	13	8	13	51	59	−8	34	
9	Strasbourg	34	11	11	12	43	41	+2	33	Invited to Inter-Cities Fairs Cup
10	Angers	34	11	11	12	54	62	−8	33	
11	Rennes	34	12	9	13	54	65	−11	33	
12	Sedan	34	14	4	16	62	52	+10	32	
13	Nîmes	34	12	8	14	45	45	0	32	
14	Rouen	34	12	8	14	50	51	−1	32	
15	Stade Français (O)	34	13	6	15	48	53	−5	32	Inter-Cities Fairs Cup and qualification to relegation play-offs
16	Racing Paris (R)	34	12	7	15	66	76	−10	31	Qualification to relegation play-offs
17	Reims (R)	34	8	11	15	37	56	−19	27	Relegation to French Division 2
18	Nice (R)	34	7	9	18	45	74	−29	23	Relegation to French Division 2

Rules for classification: Victory: 2 points, Draw: 1 point, Defeat: 0 points
(C) Champions; (O) Play-off winners; (R) Relegated
Notes:

Promoted from Division 2, who will play in Division 1 season 1964/1965

- Lille OSC: Champion
- FC Sochaux-Montbéliard: runner-up
- SC Toulon: Fourth place (FC Metz (3rd) did not qualify)

== Results ==
Home \ Away	ANG	BOR	RCL	OL	ASM	NAN	NIC	NMS	RCP	REI	REN	ROU	STE	SED	SFF	RCS	TOU	VAL
Angers		1–1	1–2	1–1	4–4	3–3	0–3	0–1	2–1	3–1	1–1	3–0	3–1	1–0	1–3	1–1	4–3	2–2
Bordeaux	3–0		1–1	4–0	0–0	2–0	6–2	2–2	2–2	4–2	3–1	2–0	2–3	3–2	4–1	2–0	2–1	0–3
Lens	4–0	8–1		1–2	0–0	2–0	2–1	4–2	10–2	2–1	5–0	0–2	4–2	3–1	3–0	2–1	2–1	2–0
Lyon	2–2	3–1	1–1		5–1	1–1	0–0	2–1	5–1	3–1	4–2	0–1	4–5	2–0	2–0	1–1	1–2	1–1
Monaco	0–1	2–0	5–0	0–1		3–1	0–0	2–0	5–3	1–0	3–2	2–1	2–1	3–1	0–1	4–2	5–0	3–0
Nantes	1–0	4–1	2–1	3–1	1–3		3–0	2–1	1–0	0–0	2–1	7–1	1–3	2–2	3–1	2–1	2–2	3–1
Nice	3–1	2–0	3–2	1–2	0–2	1–2		3–2	1–1	1–1	0–2	2–0	1–1	2–4	3–1	1–1	2–4	1–3
Nîmes	2–0	0–0	1–1	5–0	1–0	3–0	0–0		3–1	4–0	3–1	0–2	0–2	4–2	3–0	1–1	1–0	2–0
Racing Paris	3–4	3–1	3–2	1–3	1–5	3–0	3–2	5–0		2–1	0–2	2–2	1–3	2–2	3–2	3–0	1–1	1–3
Reims	1–1	1–0	1–0	2–2	2–3	1–1	2–0	0–0	1–4		3–3	0–0	3–1	1–0	0–3	0–0	1–3	1–4
Rennes	2–4	2–2	0–0	2–3	2–1	3–1	3–1	3–1	2–2	2–0		2–1	1–1	1–0	4–3	0–0	4–2	2–1
Rouen	0–0	0–0	3–0	2–2	4–0	5–2	3–0	1–0	1–2	3–4	3–1		0–0	2–2	2–0	3–0	2–1	0–4
Saint-Étienne	2–2	4–0	1–0	2–1	4–1	6–1	2–2	3–0	2–1	1–1	3–0	1–0		2–1	0–1	2–2	7–1	1–1
Sedan	2–1	2–4	2–3	2–0	4–0	2–0	8–1	3–1	1–0	2–0	5–0	2–1	3–0		2–0	2–1	1–1	0–2
Stade Français	2–2	2–0	1–0	1–2	1–0	4–0	2–2	0–0	2–3	0–2	4–2	5–2	1–3	3–2		1–0	0–0	0–2
Strasbourg	2–1	3–1	1–2	5–0	1–1	0–0	2–1	3–0	2–1	1–2	2–1	1–0	2–0	2–0	1–1		1–1	1–0
Toulouse FC	4–0	0–1	4–2	1–0	1–1	1–0	2–1	1–1	2–2	0–0	1–1	2–2	4–0	2–0	0–2	3–2		2–1
Valenciennes	1–3	1–0	0–0	0–1	0–0	0–0	7–2	1–0	1–3	2–1	0–0	2–1	1–2	2–0	0–0	1–0	2–3	

Legend: Blue = home team win; Yellow = draw; Red = away team win.

== Relegation play-offs ==
Pos	Team	Pld	W	D	L	GF	GA	GD	Pts	Qualification	SFF	TOU	RCP	MET
1	Stade Français	4	2	1	1	10	8	+2	5	Qualification to French Division 1	—	4–1		2–1
2	Toulon	4	2	0	2	9	9	0	4	Qualification to French Division 1	3–1	—	5–1	
3	Racing Paris	4	2	0	2	8	9	−1	4	Qualification to French Division 2		3–0	—	2–1
4	Metz	4	1	1	2	8	9	−1	3	Qualification to French Division 2	3–3		3–2	—

Rules for classification: 1) points; 2) goal difference; 3) number of goals scored.
Victory: 2 points, Draw: 1 point, Defeat: 0 points

== Top goalscorers ==
Rank	Player	Club	Goals
1	(Algeria) Ahmed Oudjani	Lens	30
2	(France) André Guy	Saint-Étienne	28
3	(France) Néstor Combin	Lyon	23
4	(France) Lucien Cossou	Monaco	21
5	(France) Jean Deloffre	Lens	18
5	(Algeria) Mohamed Salem	Sedan	18
7	(Algeria) Rachid Mekhloufi	Saint-Étienne	16
8	(France) (Argentina) Héctor De Bourgoing	Bordeaux	15
8	(France) Guy Van Sam	Racing Paris	15
10	(France) Stéphane Bruey	Angers	14
10	(France) Giovanni Pellegrini	Rennes	14
10	(Cameroon) N'Ganga Samuel Edimo	Toulouse FC	14

== Attendances ==
#	Club	Average
1	Racing	16,508
2	Saint-Étienne	13,835
3	Stade français	13,402
4	Girondins	12,768
5	Nantes	11,011
6	Strasbourg	10,601
7	Stade rennais	10,554
8	Lens	9,568
9	Rouen	9,372
10	Reims	8,982
11	Olympique lyonnais	8,573
12	Nice	8,490
13	Toulouse	7,576
14	Nîmes	7,564
15	Valenciennes	7,493
16	Angers	7,103
17	Sedan	4,543
18	Monaco	4,307
