= 1951–52 French Division 1 =

14th season of French Division 1

Division Nationale
- Season: 1951–52

OGC Nice won Division 1 season 1951/1952 of the French Association Football League with 46 points.

== Participating teams ==
- Bordeaux
- Le Havre AC
- RC Lens
- Lille OSC
- Olympique Lyonnais
- Olympique de Marseille
- FC Metz
- FC Nancy
- OGC Nice
- Nîmes Olympique
- RC Paris
- Stade de Reims
- Stade Rennais UC
- CO Roubaix-Tourcoing
- AS Saint-Etienne
- FC Sète
- FC Sochaux-Montbéliard
- RC Strasbourg
Location of teams in 1951–52 Division 1

== Final table ==
Pos	Team	Pld	W	D	L	GF	GA	GAv	Pts	Qualification or relegation
1	Nice (C)	34	21	4	9	65	42	1.548	46	
2	Bordeaux	34	20	5	9	88	49	1.796	45	
3	Lille	34	19	6	9	85	50	1.700	44	
4	Reims	34	16	6	12	64	48	1.333	38	
5	Metz	34	14	10	10	48	45	1.067	38	
6	Nîmes	34	16	5	13	63	47	1.340	37	
7	Le Havre	34	15	7	12	55	44	1.250	37	
8	Roubaix-Tourcoing	34	14	8	12	57	44	1.295	36	
9	Saint-Étienne	34	15	6	13	69	68	1.015	36	
10	Sète	34	14	8	12	54	56	0.964	36	
11	Nancy	34	12	11	11	59	53	1.113	35	
12	Sochaux	34	12	7	15	51	54	0.944	31	
13	Lens	34	12	7	15	54	61	0.885	31	
14	Racing Paris	34	13	5	16	60	71	0.845	31	
15	Rennes	34	10	8	16	51	85	0.600	28	
16	Marseille (O)	34	9	9	16	52	76	0.684	27	Qualification to relegation play-offs
17	Lyon (R)	34	7	6	21	38	78	0.487	20	Relegation to French Division 2
18	Strasbourg (R)	34	4	8	22	38	80	0.475	16	Relegation to French Division 2

Rules for classification: Victory: 2 points, Draw: 1 point, Defeat: 0 points
(C) Champions; (O) Play-off winners; (R) Relegated

Promoted from Division 2, who will play in Division 1 season 1952/1953

- Stade français (football): Champion of Division 2
- SO Montpellier: Runner-up

== Results ==
Home \ Away	BOR	LHA	RCL	LIL	OL	OM	MET	FCN	NIC	NMS	RCP	REI	REN	CRT	STE	SÉT	SOC	RCS
Bordeaux		4–1	4–1	6–0	6–1	6–1	3–2	4–1	1–3	4–2	3–0	2–0	3–2	4–0	9–0	2–1	2–1	1–1
Le Havre	0–0		0–1	2–0	2–0	2–0	1–1	1–1	3–1	2–0	0–2	4–2	1–2	2–0	0–2	3–2	1–2	5–1
Lens	0–0	1–1		0–2	4–2	2–1	0–1	4–0	1–2	0–1	3–1	3–1	3–0	0–0	2–5	4–2	3–1	5–1
Lille	2–2	1–3	5–0		3–0	3–3	3–2	0–3	6–0	2–1	5–1	1–0	9–1	2–1	5–1	6–1	7–3	3–1
Lyon	0–1	3–0	4–1	0–3		2–2	2–2	0–1	0–2	4–3	1–1	2–5	3–2	0–0	4–2	2–6	0–0	2–3
Marseille	6–0	0–0	1–0	0–2	3–1		4–0	3–2	2–4	3–1	0–0	1–3	1–1	1–1	3–10	2–2	1–1	2–1
Metz	2–1	0–4	1–1	2–1	2–0	2–1		4–2	0–2	1–2	2–2	0–0	4–0	3–0	2–2	3–1	3–1	2–0
Nancy	2–1	2–1	3–2	0–2	4–0	0–1	2–2		1–1	0–0	6–3	1–1	9–1	0–2	2–0	2–2	2–1	2–2
Nice	3–1	0–1	3–2	3–1	6–1	2–0	2–0	1–1		3–0	1–0	2–1	3–0	2–1	3–0	2–1	0–1	2–1
Nîmes	2–3	2–0	4–1	5–0	0–0	1–0	0–0	1–2	3–1		2–2	2–0	7–0	3–3	5–1	1–2	3–1	2–1
Racing Paris	1–0	2–6	3–1	2–1	4–0	5–1	1–2	3–1	3–2	1–2		5–2	1–5	2–1	1–3	0–2	0–4	5–2
Reims	6–1	3–1	5–2	1–0	1–0	8–1	2–0	0–0	2–1	1–0	1–1		4–0	2–1	1–0	6–0	1–5	0–0
Rennes	2–2	2–2	0–0	2–2	2–0	1–2	0–1	1–1	0–3	2–0	4–1	2–0		2–2	2–3	2–0	5–1	2–1
Roubaix-Tourcoing	2–1	3–1	1–2	2–2	3–0	5–2	0–0	2–1	3–0	1–2	3–2	1–0	2–0		1–2	4–0	2–0	5–0
Saint-Étienne	1–4	1–1	1–1	1–3	1–0	4–2	3–0	1–2	1–1	0–2	0–3	1–1	5–0	1–0		2–1	4–1	5–0
Sète	1–0	3–1	1–1	0–0	0–2	2–0	1–0	0–0	1–1	1–3	2–0	2–0	3–3	2–1	4–2		3–1	0–0
Sochaux	0–2	0–1	3–1	1–1	2–0	1–1	0–0	3–1	2–0	2–0	1–0	4–1	5–1	1–2	1–1	0–3		0–1
Strasbourg	2–5	0–2	1–2	0–2	1–2	1–1	1–2	3–2	1–3	3–1	2–2	2–3	1–2	2–2	1–3	0–2	1–1	

Legend: Blue = home team win; Yellow = draw; Red = away team win.

== Relegation play-offs ==
Team 1	Agg.	Team 2	1st leg	2nd leg
Marseille	5–3	Valenciennes	1–3	4–0

== Top goalscorers ==
Rank	Player	Club	Goals
1	(Sweden) Gunnar Andersson	Marseille	31
2	(Netherlands) Lambertus De Harder	Bordeaux	25
2	(France) Marcel Rouvière	Nîmes	25
4	(France) Jean Saunier	Le Havre	20
4	(France) André Strappe	Lille	20
6	(France) Maurice Singier	Sète	19
7	(Netherlands) Wilhelm Van Lent	Lens	18
8	(France) Léon Deladerrière	Nancy	17
9	(France) Jean-Jacques Kretschmar	Roubaix-Tourcoing	16
9	(Czechoslovakia) André Lukac	Bordeaux	16

== OGC Nice Winning Squad 1951-'52 ==
Goal

- (France) Marcel Domingo
- (France) Marcel Lupi

Defence

- (France) Ahmed Firoud
- (Argentina) César Hector Gonzales
- (France) Alphonse Martinez
- (France) Serge Pedini
- (France) Guy Poitevin

Midfield

- (France) Jean Belver
- (France) Abdelaziz Ben Tifour
- (France) Désiré Carré
- (France) Léon Rossi

Attack

- (Sweden) Pär Bengtsson
- (France) Antoine Bonifaci
- (Argentina) Luis Carniglia
- (France) Georges Cesari
- (France) Jean Courteaux
- (Luxembourg) Victor Nuremberg

Management

- (France) Numa Andoire (Coach)

== Attendances ==
#	Club	Average
1	Racing	21,131
2	Girondins	17,475
3	Nice	15,223
4	LOSC	13,085
5	Marseille	12,613
6	Le Havre	11,830
7	Strasbourg	11,316
8	Olympique lyonnais	10,688
9	Metz	10,424
10	Nîmes	10,116
11	Saint-Étienne	9,802
12	Lens	9,639
13	Roubaix-Tourcoing	8,780
14	Stade rennais	8,530
15	Nancy	8,221
16	Reims	7,766
17	Sochaux	7,093
18	Sète	5,011
