= Jean Courteaux =

French footballer (1926–2003)

Personal information
- Date of birth: 6 November 1926
- Place of birth: Dammartin-sur-Tigeaux, France
- Date of death: 11 August 2003 (aged 76)
- Height: 5 ft 10 in (1.78 m)
- Position: Striker

Senior career*
Years	Team	Apps	(Gls)
1948–1950	RC Paris		
1950–1953	Nice	82	(47)
1953–1954	RC Paris	36	(35)
1954–1955	Nice	14	(4)
1955–1956	Stade Français	18	(7)
1956–1958	CA Paris	51	(23)
1958–1958	La Voulte		
- * Club domestic league appearances and goals

Jean Courteaux (6 November 1926 – 11 August 2003) was a French footballer who played as a striker. He was best known for his three years at Nice, where he was an important part of two title-winning teams.

== Career ==
Courteaux was born in Dammartin-sur-Tigeaux. He joined local team RC Paris in around 1948, and in 1949, he made his debut. He played over half the games that season, and was sold to Nice in 1950.

In his first year at Nice, he established himself as a skilled striker, scoring 27 goals in the league and finishing second on the list of top goalscorers, one goal behind one of the best strikers in France, Roger Piantoni. Courteaux's exploits helped Nice to win the league for the first time. His partnership with Swede Pär Bengtsson resulted in 42 goals, which is still tied for Nice's most prolific partnership of all time (Hervé Revelli and Dick van Dijk equalled the record in the 1972-73 season. The next year, he remained a mainstay in the Nice attack, but failed to make as much of an impression scoring only 11 goals (though this was enough to make him Nice's second-top scorer. Nice did win the league that year, and Couteaux stayed on for another year.

In the 1952–53 season, Couteaux only scored 7 goals, as Nice finished in the lower half of the table. He was sold to RC Paris, where he started his career, who were now in the Division 2. The lower league proved too easy for Courteaux, as in the 1953–54 season he scored a massive 35 goals in 36 games, almost one goal every game. He finished that year as the top scorer. as RC Paris were promoted in third place.

After seeing him do very well in the Division 2, Nice (who had won the Coupe de France but finished mid-table in the league) re-signed Courteaux. Courteaux, however, was largely overshadowed by 22 year old Just Fontaine, and was sold once more to a Division 2 team when the 1954–55 season ended: Stade Français. At Stade Français, he somewhat returned to goalscoring ways, scoring 11 goals in 26 matches.

After that season he moved to tiny Parisian club CA Paris, who were a decidedly lower-half team in Division 2: In 1955–56 they had finished 19th out of 20. In Courteaux's first year, he scored sixteen goals - almost 40% of the team's 41 goals - but couldn't stop CA Paris from once more finishing 19th. The next year, Courteaux, then 31, played in less than half CA Paris' games, though the club did finish in 18th that year out of 22, higher than usual.

== After football ==
Courteaux retired from professional football in 1958, and joined amateur club La Voulte. The next year, he hung up his playing boots for good. He died in 2003 at the age of 76.
