= Lagadec =

Lagadec or Lagadeg is a surname, and may refer to:

Lagadec derives from the Breton adjectif lagadeg which means "who has good eyes, possibly big eyes".

- Patrick Lagadec (born 1948), French economics researcher
- Jean-Baptiste Lagadec - Breton writer
- Jean-Louis Lagadec (1933–2012), French footballer
- Jehan Lagadec or Lagadeuc - Breton priest
- Annick Lagadec (1950–2018), French journalist and Breton activist
- Madeleine Lagadeg (1962–1989), French nurse and daughter of Jean-Baptiste Lagadec
