= Pär Bengtsson =

Swedish footballer (1922–2007)

Personal information
- Date of birth: 22 July 1922
- Place of birth: Halmstad, Sweden
- Date of death: 23 October 2007 (aged 85)
- Height: 5 ft 10 in (1.78 m)
- Position: Striker

Senior career*
Years	Team	Apps	(Gls)
1942–1946	Halmstads BK	65	(18)
1946–1948	IF Elfsborg	59	(37)
1949–1950	Torino	29	(10)
1950–1952	Nice	53	(27)
1952–1953	Toulouse	18	(7)
1953–1955	Rennes	54	(29)
Total		278	(128)

International career
1947–1948	Sweden B	2	(0)
- * Club domestic league appearances and goals as of 7 May 2020

Pär Bengtsson (21 July 1922 – 23 October 2007) was a Swedish professional footballer who played as a striker.

== Club career ==
=== Halmstads BK ===
Bengtsson began playing for his local team, Halmstads BK, who had just been promoted to the Allsvenskan, the highest level of football in Sweden. Although World War II was going on at the time, Sweden was neutral, though playing sports in wartime did mean that the roster had to be rotated more often than normal. Because Halmstad had just been promoted, they struggled in the Allsvenskan, and they never finished higher than 6th (out of 12) before being relegated in 1946.

=== IF Elfsborg ===
When Halmstad was relegated, Bengtsson was transferred to Elfsborg, who had been a strong team, finishing second for three straight seasons between 1942 and 1945. The year Halmstad was relegated, however, they had faltered and finished 7th. After signing Bengtsson, the rebounded slightly, finishing fourth in 1946–47, but they finished just one point above relegation in 1947–48, and only one place above relegation in 1948–49.

=== Torino ===
Bengtsson was sold to Torino in Italy in 1949, just after the entire team had been killed in the Superga air disaster. He played for one season with the Italian club, who came in sixth that year, scoring ten goals.

=== Nice ===
Bengtsson went on to play for OGC Nice, with whom he won the Division 1 in 1950–51. He finished as the t-10th top goalscorer with 15 goals. He and his fellow attacker Jean Courteaux scored a total of 42 goals, which was then Nice's most prolific partnership of all time (Hervé Revelli and Dick van Dijk equalled the record in the 1972–73 season, but it has still never been beaten). The following season, he scored twelve goals, and though he was Nice's top scorer, and Nice won the Division 1 again, he was sold to a mid-table team in Division 2, Toulouse.

=== Toulouse ===
In the 1952–53 season, Toulouse skyrocketed to the top of the Division 2, but Bengtsson only played slightly more than half their games: He was aging, and he was 31 at the end of the season.

=== Rennes ===
Toulouse was promoted to Division 1, but Bengtsson stayed in Division 2, being transferred to Stade Rennais. In his first year at Rennais, he became a star forward for the team, scoring 21 goals in 35 games. The next season, however, he floundered. He played in only half the games, and he scored a mere seven goals.

== International career ==
Bengtsson was part of Sweden's squad for the football tournament at the 1948 Summer Olympics, but he did not play in any matches. He made two appearances for the Sweden B team in 1947 and 1948.

== After football ==
Bengtsson retired in 1955. He died in 2007 at the age of 85.

== Honours ==
Nice

- French Division 1: 1950–51, 1951–52

Toulouse

- French Division 2: 1952–53
