= Mokhtar Ben Nacef =

Tunisian association football player and manager (1927–2006)

Personal information
- Date of birth: 4 September 1927
- Place of birth: Bizerte, French Tunisia
- Date of death: 24 August 2006 (aged 78)
- Position: Left back

Senior career*
Years	Team	Apps	(Gls)
1945–1948	CA Bizertin		
1948–1951	Nice		
1951–1953	Cannes		
1953–1955	Nice		
1955–1956	Toulon		
1956–1958	CA Bizertin		
1958–1959	Stade Tunisien		
1959–1961	US Monastir		

International career
1957–1959	Tunisia		

Managerial career
- 1964–1968: Tunisia
- CA Bizertin
- * Club domestic league appearances and goals

Mokhtar Ben Nacef (Arabic: مختار بن ناصف; 4 September 1927 – 24 August 2006) was a Tunisian footballer and manager.

== Playing career ==
Ben Nacef joined Nice in 1948, and in 1949, became the first ever professional Tunisian player in France. Following two years at Cannes from 1951 to 1953, he returned to Nice, where he helped them win the Coupe de France in his first season back.

After Tunisian independence, he became the first captain of the Tunisia national team.

== Managerial career ==
Ben Nacef became the manager of the Tunisia national team in 1965, and coached them at that year's African Cup of Nations, where they finished as runners-up to Ghana. He remained as the coach of Tunisia until 1968, when he was succeeded by Yugoslav coach Radojica Radojičić. Later on, he held various positions within the Tunisian Football Federation.

During the 1970s, Ben Nacef also managed CA Bizertin.

== Death ==
Ben Nacef died on 24 August 2006, at the age of 78.

== Honours ==
=== Player ===
CA Bizertin

- Tunisian Ligue Professionnelle 1: 1945–46

Nice

- French Division 1: 1950–51
- Coupe de France: 1953–54

=== Manager ===
- African Cup of Nations runner-up: 1965
