= Roger Jouve =

French footballer (born 1949)

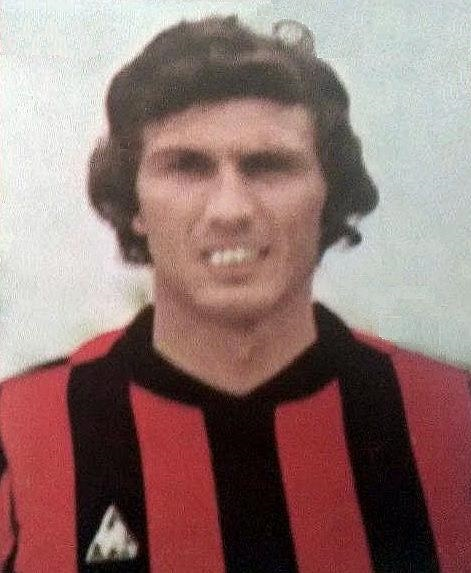
- Jouve with Nice in 1976

Personal information
- Date of birth: 11 March 1949 (age 77)
- Place of birth: Marseille, France
- Height: 1.73 m (5 ft 8 in)
- Position: Midfielder

Senior career*
Years	Team	Apps	(Gls)
1965–1978	Nice	302	(27)
1978–1980	Strasbourg	38	(0)

International career
1973–1979	France	7	(1)
- * Club domestic league appearances and goals

Roger Jouve (born 11 March 1949) is a French former professional footballer who played as a midfielder. Throughout his club career, he played for French sides Nice and Strasbourg. At international level, he represented the France national team on seven occasions between 1973 and 1979, scoring once.

== Honours ==
Strasbourg

- French championship: 1978–79

Nice

- Division 2: 1969–70
