= Anton Marek =

Austrian footballer (1913–1963)

Personal information
- Date of birth: 9 February 1913
- Place of birth: Vienna, Austria
- Date of death: 6 February 1963 (aged 49)
- Position: Defender

Senior career*
Years	Team	Apps	(Gls)
- Nord-Wien
- Wacker Vienna
- Club Français
1934–1940	Lens		
1940–1941	Toulouse		
1941–1945	Lens		

Managerial career
- 1945–1947: Lens
- 1947–1949: Nice
- 1949–1952: Cannes
- 1952–1953: Draguignan
- 1953–1956: Lens
- 1956–1958: Monaco
- * Club domestic league appearances and goals

Anton Marek (9 February 1913 – 6 February 1963) was an Austrian football player and manager. A defender, he played for Nord-Wien, Wacker Vienna, Club Français, Lens and Toulouse. After retiring Marek managed Lens, Nice, Cannes, Draguignan and Monaco.
