= Joaquín Valle =

Spanish footballer

Personal information
- Full name: Joaquín Valle Benítez
- Date of birth: 18 April 1916
- Place of birth: Las Palmas de Gran Canaria, Spain
- Date of death: 24 December 1980 (aged 64)
- Position: Striker

Senior career*
Years	Team	Apps	(Gls)
1937–1948	Nice	229	(186)
1948–1949	RCD Espanyol	1	(0)
Total		230	(186)
- * Club domestic league appearances and goals

Joaquín Valle Benítez (18 April 1916 – 24 December 1980) was a Spanish professional football striker known mainly for his stint with French club OGC Nice.

== Career ==
Valle was born in Las Palmas de Gran Canaria, Spain. Along with his brother Luis, he joined OGC Nice in 1937 during the club's off-season. He spent a decade at the club becoming Nice's all-time leading goalscorer. In league matches, Valle scored 186 goals in 229 appearances. In total with the team, he scored 339 goals in 407 appearances. In July 1948, Valle left the club to return to Spain and played for RCD Español.
