= Numa Andoire =

French footballer and manager (1908–1994)

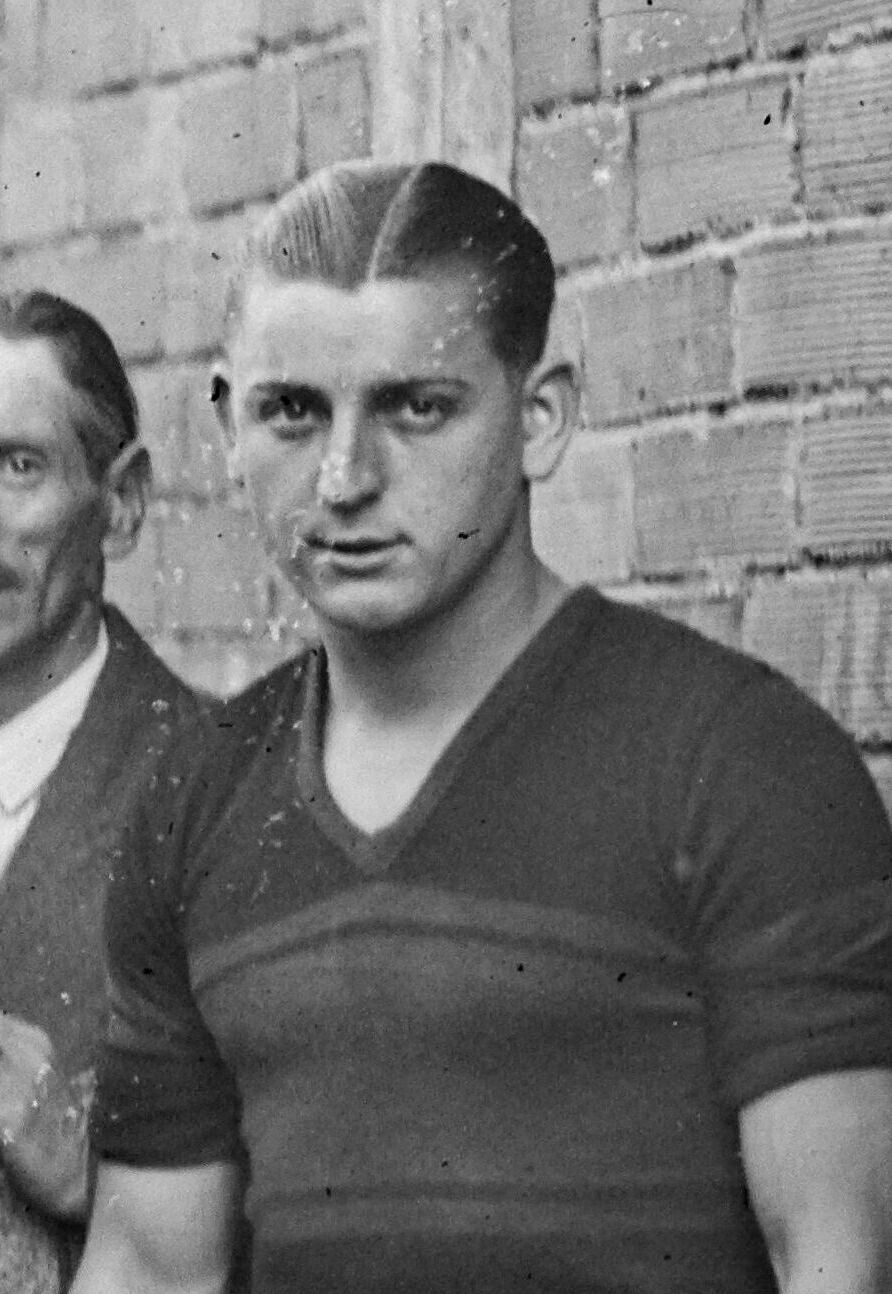
- Andoire in 1931

Personal information
- Date of birth: 19 March 1908
- Place of birth: Coursegoules, France
- Date of death: 26 November 1994 (aged 86)
- Place of death: Antibes, France
- Position: Defender

Senior career*
Years	Team	Apps	(Gls)
1929–1932	Nice		
1932–1933	FC Antibes		
1933–1936	Red Star		
1936	FC Nancy		
1936–1938	Cannes		
1938–1939	Toulouse FC (1937)		
1939–1942	Cannes		
1945–1946	FC Antibes		

International career
1930	France	Called-up	

Managerial career
- 1945–1946: FC Antibes
- 1950–1952: Nice
- 1962–1964: Nice
- * Club domestic league appearances and goals

Numa Andoire (19 March 1908 – 26 November 1994) was a French football defender and a manager. He participated at the 1930 FIFA World Cup, but did not gain any caps with the France football team.

== Club career ==
Andoire played for Nice between 1929 and 1932, FC Antibes in the 1932–1933 season, Red Star from 1933 to 1936 FC Nancy for a few months in 1938. He played for Cannes from 1936 to 1938, and Toulouse between 1938 and 1939. Then he went back to Cannes from 1939 to 1942. He finished his playing career in 1945–1946 at FC Antibes.

== International career ==
Andoire was part of the France national team squad for the 1930 FIFA World Cup but was an unused substitute and did not gained any cap with France.

== Coaching career ==
Andoire started his coaching career in FC Antibes in 1945–1946 while he was still a player there. He then managed Nice from 1950 to 1952. He then retired from football and ran a hostel in Juan-les-Pins. He came back to football and managed Nice again from 1962 to 1964.

== Honours ==
=== As a manager ===
Nice

- French championship: 1951, 1952
- Coupe de France: 1952
