= Jim McDewitt =

Scottish football manager

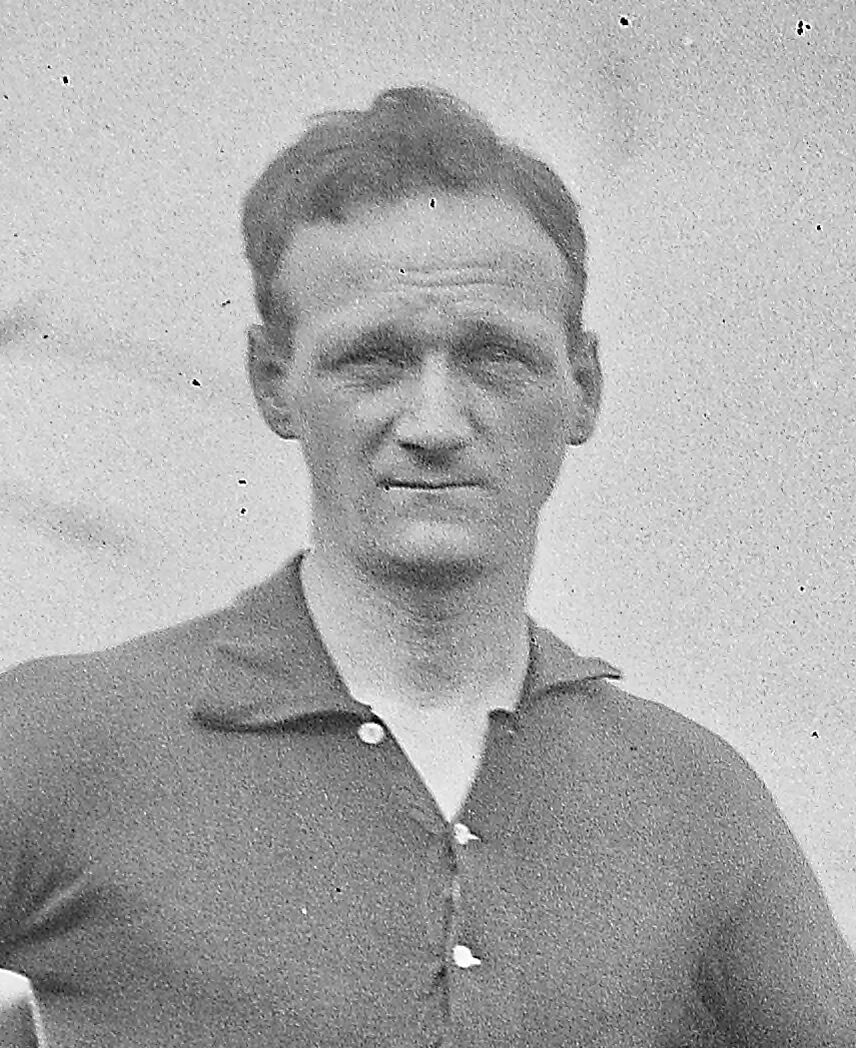

Personal information
- Full name: James McDewitt
- Place of birth: Scotland

Managerial career
- Years: Team
- 1932–1934: Nice

James McDewitt was a Scottish professional football manager who coached French team Nice between 1932 and 1934.
