= Jean Luciano =

French footballer (1921-1997)

Personal information
- Full name: Jean Antoine Virgile Luciano
- Date of birth: 2 January 1921
- Place of birth: Nice, France
- Date of death: 7 July 1997 (aged 76)
- Position: Midfielder

Senior career*
Years	Team	Apps	(Gls)
1936–1945	Nice		
1945–1947	Stade Français		
1947–1948	CO Roubaix-Tourcoing		
1948–1950	Nice		
1950–1951	Real Madrid		
1951–1953	Las Palmas		
1953–1955	AS Aix		

International career
1949–1950	France	4	(1)

Managerial career
- 1957–1962: Nice
- 1962–1964: Lausanne-Sport
- 1964: Sporting CP
- 1964–1967: Vitória S.C.
- 1967–1970: Toulon
- 1970–1972: Monaco
- 1972–1973: Toulon
- 1976–1978: Gazélec Ajaccio
- * Club domestic league appearances and goals

Jean Luciano (2 January 1921 – 7 July 1997) was a French football player and manager who played as a midfielder. He coached OGC Nice, Sporting CP, Vitória S.C., SC Toulon, AS Monaco FC and Gazélec Ajaccio.
