= Coursegoules =

Commune in Provence-Alpes-Côte d'Azur, France

Coursegoules Corsegolas (Occitan)
- Commune
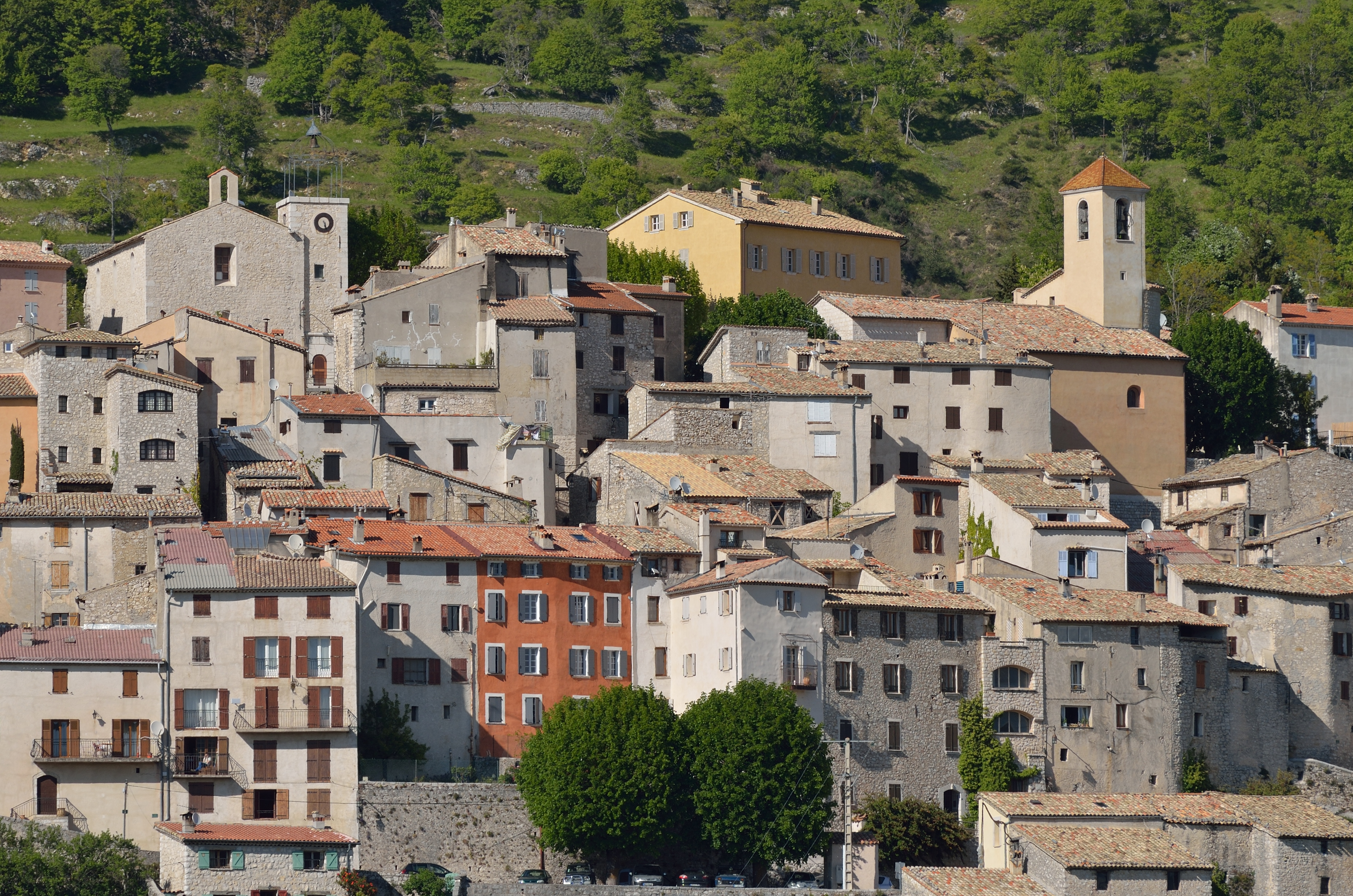
- A general view of the village of Coursegoules

- Coat of arms
- Location of Coursegoules
- Location within France Location within Provence-Alpes-Côte d'Azur
- Coordinates: 43°47′39″N 7°02′40″E
- Country: France
- Region: Provence-Alpes-Côte d'Azur
- Department: Alpes-Maritimes
- Arrondissement: Grasse
- Canton: Vence
- Intercommunality: CA Sophia Antipolis

Government
  - Mayor (2026–32): Dominique Trabaud
- Area^{1}: 40.98 km^{2} (15.82 sq mi)
- Elevation: 1,020 m (3,350 ft)
- Highest elevation: 1,700 m (5,600 ft)
- Lowest elevation: 640 m (2,100 ft)
- Population (2023): 564
  - Density: 13.8/km^{2} (35.6/sq mi)
- Time zone: UTC+01:00 (CET)
  - Summer (DST): UTC+02:00 (CEST)
- INSEE/Postal code: 06050 /06140
- ^{1} French Land Register data, which excludes lakes, ponds, glaciers > 1 km^{2} (0.386 sq mi or 247 acres) and river estuaries.

Coursegoules (French pronunciation: [kuʁsəɡul]; Occitan: Corsegolas; Italian: Corsegola, formerly) is a rural commune in the Alpes-Maritimes department in the southeastern Provence-Alpes-Côte d'Azur region in France. It is part of Préalpes d'Azur Regional Natural Park.

== Demographics ==
Historical population
Year	Pop.	±% p.a.
1968	134	—
1975	155	+2.10%
1982	201	+3.78%
1990	260	+3.27%
1999	322	+2.40%
2007	440	+3.98%
2012	497	+2.47%
2017	531	+1.33%
2023	564	+1.01%
Source: INSEE

Its inhabitants are known in French as Coursegoulois (masculine) and Coursegouloises (feminine).

== Notable people ==
- Numa Andoire (1908 – 1994) was a French football defender and a manager. He participated at the 1930 FIFA World Cup, but never gained any cups with the French football team.

== Celebrity links ==
The singer Camille, in her album Ilo Veyou (2012), dedicated her song Le Berger to Coursegoules.

== See also ==
- Communes of the Alpes-Maritimes department
