= Alain Cornu =

French footballer (1936–2025)

Personal information
- Date of birth: 12 December 1936
- Place of birth: Le Cannet, France
- Date of death: 17 November 2025 (aged 88)
- Place of death: Nice, France
- Height: 1.75 m (5 ft 9 in)
- Position: Defender

Senior career*
Years	Team	Apps	(Gls)
1956–1963	Nice		
1963–1964	Stade Français		
1964–1965	Nice		
1965–1967	Bastia		
1967–1970	Toulon		

International career
1962	France	1	(0)
- * Club domestic league appearances and goals

Alain Cornu (12 December 1936 – 17 November 2025) was a French footballer who played as a defender for Nice between 1956 and 1965. He also played one match for the France national team in the 1962.

== Career ==
Born on 12 December 1936 in the Alpes-Maritimes town of Le Cannet, Cornu began his football career at Nice in 1956, aged 20, with whom he played for seven years, until 1963, helping Nice win the 1958–59 French Division 1. After a brief stint at Stade Français, he returned to Nice, which he helped win 1964–65 Ligue 2, thus returning to the top flight. After leaving Nice in 1965, he joined Bastia, where he stayed for two years, until 1967, when he moved to Toulon, where he retired in 1970, aged 34. In total, he scored 4 goals in 167 Ligue 1 matches. On 11 April 1962, the 25-year-old Cornu earned his first (and only) international cap for France in a friendly match against Poland at the Parc des Princes in Paris; he made a line clearance to prevent a goal from Ernest Pohl in a 3–1 loss.

== Death ==
Cornu died in Nice on 17 November 2025, at the age of 88.

== Honours ==
Nice

- Ligue 1: 1958–59
- Ligue 2: 1964–65
