= Robert Blanc =

French footballer (1944–1992)

Personal information
- Full name: Robert Henri Léon Blanc
- Date of birth: 18 May 1944
- Place of birth: Carnoules, France
- Date of death: 17 May 1992 (aged 47)
- Place of death: Paris, France
- Height: 1.76 m (5 ft 9 in)
- Position: Forward

Youth career
- 1954–1961: Toulon

Senior career*
| Years | Team | Apps | (Gls) |
| 1961–1965 | Toulon | 65 | (21) |
| 1965–1966 | Angoulême | 36 | (15) |
| 1966 | Boulogne | 17 | (7) |
| 1967 | Lyon | 11 | (1) |
| 1967–1968 | Bastia | 41 | (13) |
| 1968–1970 | Nancy | 44 | (37) |
| 1970–1972 | Limoges | 50 | (38) |
| 1972–1974 | Poitiers | 59 | (24) |
| 1974–1975 | Mantes | | |
| 1975–1976 | Malakoff | | |
| Total | | 323+ | (156+) |
- * Club domestic league appearances and goals

Robert Henri Léon Blanc (18 May 1944 – 17 May 1992) was a French professional footballer who played as forward. (Note: Robert Blanc at WorldFootball.net) He was the top scorer of the 1969–70 Division 2 and of the Group Centre of the 1970–71 Division 2.

== Honours ==
Bastia

- Division 2: 1967–68

Individual

- Division 2 top scorer: 1969–70
- Division 2 Group Centre top scorer: 1970–71
