= Ferenc Kocsur =

French-Hungarian footballer (1930–1989)

Personal information
- Date of birth: 2 September 1930
- Place of birth: Brunssum, Netherlands
- Date of death: 19 September 1989 (aged 59)
- Position: Midfielder

Youth career
- La Combelle

Senior career*
Years	Team	Apps	(Gls)
1949–1956	Saint-Étienne	166	(31)
1956–1961	Nice	109	(9)

International career
1952	France	3	(0)

Managerial career
- 1978–1979: Nice
- * Club domestic league appearances and goals

Ferenc Kocsur (2 September 1930 – 19 September 1989) also referred to as Jacques Koczur or Ferry or François Koczur, was a French-Hungarian football player and manager who represented the France national team.

He acquired French nationality by naturalization on 27 January 1950.
