= Yeso Amalfi =

Brazilian footballer (1925–2014)

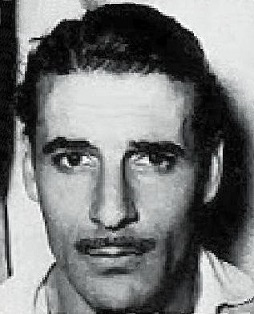
- Amalfi in 1950

Personal information
- Full name: Yeso Noce Cardoso Amalfi
- Date of birth: 6 December 1925
- Place of birth: São Paulo, Brazil
- Date of death: 10 May 2014 (aged 88)
- Place of death: São Paulo, Brazil
- Position: Striker

Youth career
- 1942–1947: São Paulo

Senior career*
| Years | Team | Apps | (Gls) |
| 1946–1948 | São Paulo | 79 | (30) |
| 1948–1949 | Boca Juniors | 15 | (2) |
| 1949–1950 | Peñarol | | |
| 1950 | Palmeiras | | |
| 1950–1951 | Nice | | |
| 1951–1952 | Torino | | |
| 1952 | Monaco | | |
| 1952–1955 | RC Paris | | |
| 1955–1957 | Red Star | | |
| 1957–1959 | Marseille | 21 | (1) |
- * Club domestic league appearances and goals

Yeso Amalfi (6 December 1925 – 10 May 2014) was a Brazilian footballer who played as a striker.
