= Pancho Gonzales (footballer) =

Argentine footballer

Personal information
- Full name: César Héctor Gonzalez
- Date of birth: 7 December 1926
- Place of birth: Buenos Aires, Argentina
- Date of death: 5 March 2016 (aged 89)
- Place of death: Nice, France
- Height: 1.74 m (5 ft 8 1/2 in)
- Position: Defender

Senior career*
Years	Team	Apps	(Gls)
1948–1951	Boca Juniors		
1951–1961	OGC Nice	359	(3)
1961–1963	FC Nantes	76	(0)

Managerial career
- 1963–1964: SC Draguignan
- 1964–1969: OGC Nice
- 1972–1973: Bourges 18
- 1973–1974: Angers SCO
- 1976–1978: FC Rouen
- 1981–1982: AAJ Blois football
- 1986: Ivory Coast
Medal record
Men's football
Representing Ivory Coast (as manager)
Africa Cup of Nations
Bronze medal – third place	1986
- * Club domestic league appearances and goals

Pancho Gonzales (7 December 1926 – 5 March 2016) was an Argentine footballer.

== Club career ==
Pancho Gonzales played for Boca Juniors, OGC Nice and FC Nantes. At age 24, he moved to France where he would star for OGC Nice.

== Managial career ==
He was manager of OGC Nice and Ivory Coast. He was technical advisor of Daewoo Royals from July 1983 to July 1984.
