= Héctor de Bourgoing =

Argentine footballer (1934-1993)

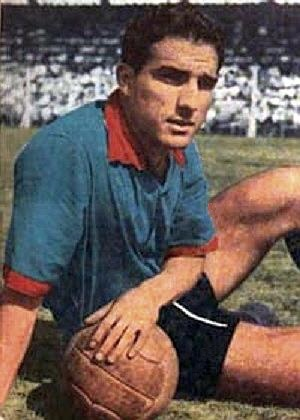
- De Bourgoing at Tigre

Personal information
- Full name: Héctor Adolfo de Bourgoing
- Date of birth: 23 July 1934
- Place of birth: Posadas, Argentina
- Date of death: 24 January 1993 (aged 58)
- Place of death: Bordeaux, France
- Height: 1.72 m (5 ft 8 in)
- Position: Right winger

Senior career*
Years	Team	Apps	(Gls)
1954–1956	Tigre	102	(39)
1957–1959	River Plate	26	(11)
1959–1963	Nice	114	(65)
1964–1969	Bordeaux	143	(68)
1969–1970	Racing Paris	18	(6)
Total		403	(189)

International career
1956–1957	Argentina	5	(0)
1962–1966	France	3	(2)
- * Club domestic league appearances and goals

Héctor Adolfo de Bourgoing (23 July 1934 – 24 January 1993) was a footballer who operated as a right winger. He played international football for Argentina and France.

== Club career ==
De Bourgoing started his career at Club Atlético Tigre in the Argentine 1st division in 1953. In 1957 he was transferred to Argentine giants River Plate where he won his first and only major title in his first season with the club.

During 1959 he was enticed into a move to France to play for Nice, he played for them for four years before moving to Bordeaux in 1963 and finally retiring from football in 1970 at Racing Paris.

== Honours ==
River Plate

- Argentine Primera División: 1957

Argentina

- Copa América: 1957

== International career ==
De Bourgoing was born in Argentina and was of French descent. He was selected to play for Argentina on five occasions before moving to Europe, where under the rules of the day he could change international allegiance to play for France. He represented the France national team in the 1966 FIFA World Cup, scoring a goal in a 2–1 defeat by Argentina's rivals Uruguay.

=== International goals ===
No.	Date	Venue	Opponent	Score	Result	Competition	Ref.
1	11 April 1962	Parc des Princes, Paris	Poland	1–3	Lost	Friendly	
2	15 July 1966	White City Stadium, London	Uruguay	1–2	Lost	1966 World Cup	
