= Antoine Bonifaci =

French footballer (1931–2021)

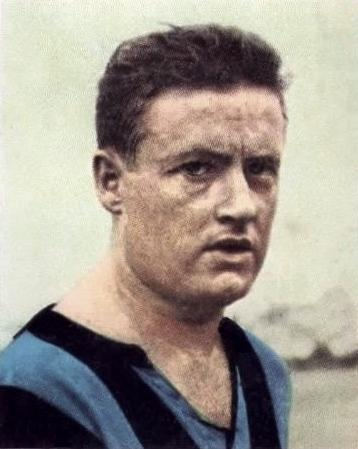
- Bonifaci with Inter Milan in 1955

Personal information
- Date of birth: 4 September 1931
- Place of birth: Bezons, France
- Date of death: 29 December 2021 (aged 90)
- Place of death: Villefranche-sur-Mer, France
- Position: Midfielder

Youth career
- Villefranche-sur-Mer

Senior career*
Years	Team	Apps	(Gls)
1950–1954	Nice	109	(9)
1954–1955	Inter Milan	25	(0)
1955–1957	Bologna	54	(2)
1957–1960	Torino	102	(1)
1960–1961	Vicenza	13	(0)
1961–1963	Stade Français	24	(1)
Total		327	(13)

International career
1951–1953	France	12	(2)
- * Club domestic league appearances and goals

Antoine Bonifaci (4 September 1931 – 29 December 2021) was a French professional footballer who played in France with Nice and Stade Français, and in Italy with Inter Milan, Bologna, Torino and Vicenza. He played for the France national team from 1951 to 1953. In 1952, he was transferred from Nice to Inter Milan for a fee of around 30 million francs.

The football stadium of Villefranche-sur-Mer bears his name.

Bonifaci died in Villefranche-sur-Mer on 29 December 2021, at the age of 90.
