= Étienne Sansonetti =

French footballer (1935–2018)

Personal information
- Date of birth: 5 December 1935
- Place of birth: Marseille, France
- Date of death: 31 May 2018 (aged 82)
- Place of death: Ajaccio, Corsica, France
- Position: Striker

Youth career
- 1947–1954: Endoume
- 1954–1956: Saint-Loup
- 1956–1958: Marseille

Senior career*
Years	Team	Apps	(Gls)
1958–1963	Marseille	98	(35)
1963–1964	Valenciennes		
1964–1965	Angers		
1965–1967	Bastia		
1967–1969	Ajaccio		
1969–1970	Monaco		
1970–1972	Ajaccio		
1972–1976	Gazélec Ajaccio		
1976–1977	Ajaccio		
- * Club domestic league appearances and goals

Étienne Sansonetti (5 December 1935 – 31 May 2018) was a French professional footballer who played as a striker. Sansonetti played his club football with Marseille, Valenciennes, Angers, Bastia, AC Ajaccio, Monaco and Gazélec Ajaccio. Sansonetti was the Ligue 1 topscorer in the 1967-68 season, scoring 26 goals.
