= Paul Orsatti =

French football player and manager (1941–2026)

Personal information
- Full name: Paul Henri Noël Orsatti[
- Date of birth: 23 December 1941
- Place of birth: Ajaccio, France
- Date of death: 4 April 2026 (aged 84)
- Height: 1.70 m (5 ft 7 in)
- Position: Goalkeeper

Senior career*
Years	Team	Apps	(Gls)
1959–1963	AS Aix	8	(0)
1963–1970	Bastia	185	(0)
1970–1972	Toulon	54	(0)
1972–1973	Avignon	38	(0)
1973–1974	Toulouse	32	(0)
1974–1977	Paris FC	59	(0)
Total		?	(0)

Managerial career
- 1974: Toulouse
- 1974–1977: AS Beaune
- 1979–1980: Gazélec Ajaccio
- 1982–1985: Racing Besançon
- 1986: Toulon
- 1988–1992: Martigues
- 1995–1998: Gazélec Ajaccio
- * Club domestic league appearances and goals

Paul Henri Noël Orsatti (French: [pˈɔl ɑ̃ʁˈi nɔˈɛl ɔʁsatˈi]; 29 December 1941 – 4 April 2026) was a French football player and manager who played as a goalkeeper.

== Career ==
Orsatti played professionally from 1959 to 1977, notably winning the 1968 Division 2 championship with Bastia. He then coached until his retirement in 2012 and was named a knight of the Legion of Honour in 2013.

== Death ==
Orsatti died on 4 April 2026, at the age of 84.
