= René Ferrier =

French footballer (1936-1998)

Personal information
- Date of birth: 7 December 1936
- Place of birth: Thionne, France
- Date of death: 15 September 1998 (aged 61)
- Place of death: Saint-Étienne, France
- Height: 1.79 m (5 ft 10 in)
- Position: Midfielder

Youth career
- Cusset

Senior career*
Years	Team	Apps	(Gls)
1954–1965	Saint-Étienne	196	(38)
1965–1969	Bastia	113	(20)
Total		309	(58)

International career
1958–1964	France	24	(0)

Managerial career
- 1972–1973: ESA Brive
- 1973–1974: AAJ Blois
- * Club domestic league appearances and goals

René Ferrier (7 December 1936 – 15 September 1998) was a French professional footballer who played as a midfielder. He played for France at the Euro 1960.
