= Sadek Boukhalfa =

Algerian footballer (1934-2009)

Personal information
- Date of birth: 25 August 1934
- Place of birth: Azzaba, French Algeria (now Algeria)
- Date of death: 3 July 2009 (aged 74)
- Place of death: Nantes, France
- Height: 1.79 m (5 ft 10 in)
- Position: Midfielder

Senior career*
Years	Team	Apps	(Gls)
1957–1959	Bastia	?	(?)
1959–1962	Béziers	99	(26)
1962–1965	Nantes	75	(27)
1965–1967	Bastia	63	(23)
1967–1969	Metz	25	(7)
1969–1970	Poitiers	?	(?)
1970–1971	Blois	4	(1)

International career
1963	Algeria	1	(1)
- * Club domestic league appearances and goals

Sadek Boukhalfa (25 August 1934 – 3 July 2009) was an Algerian international footballer who played as a midfielder.

== International career ==
Boukhalfa made his only appearance for the Algerian National Team on 23 February 1963 in a friendly against Czechoslovakia in Algiers. Algeria won the game 4–0 with Boukhalfa scoring the third goal of the game.
