= 1952–53 French Division 2 =

14th season of the second-tier football league in France

Division 2
- Season: 1952–53

Statistics of Division 2 in the 1952–53 season.

== Overview ==
It was contested by 18 teams, and Toulouse won the championship.

== League standings ==
Pos	Team	Pld	W	D	L	GF	GA	GD	Pts	Promotion or relegation
1	Toulouse	34	26	4	4	92	29	+63	56	Promoted
2	AS Monaco	34	24	7	3	88	23	+65	55	Promoted
3	RC Strasbourg	34	23	7	4	87	32	+55	53	Promoted
4	AS Troyes	34	17	8	9	59	33	+26	42	
5	Besançon	34	18	5	11	69	47	+22	41	
6	Nantes	34	16	7	11	60	59	+1	39	
7	Grenoble	34	14	8	12	57	62	−5	36	
8	Olympique Lyonnais	34	12	9	13	41	54	−13	33	
9	Perpignan	34	12	8	14	59	64	−5	32	
10	Cannes	34	11	10	13	48	54	−6	32	
11	Rouen	34	11	9	14	48	43	+5	31	
12	Angers	34	12	6	16	50	61	−11	30	
13	Valenciennes	34	8	9	17	45	72	−27	25	
14	Béziers	34	8	9	17	41	69	−28	25	
15	Toulon	34	9	6	19	37	64	−27	24	
16	CA Paris	34	8	5	21	32	65	−33	21	
17	Red Star Paris	34	7	6	21	33	81	−48	20	
18	Olympique Alès	34	5	7	22	21	55	−34	17	

Source: rsssf.com
