= 1964–65 French Division 2 =

26th season of the second-tier football league in France

Division 2
- Season: 1964–65

Statistics of Division 2 in the 1964–65 season.

== Overview ==
It was contested by 16 teams, and OGC Nice won the championship.

== League standings ==
| Pos | Team | Pld | W | D | L | GF | GA | GD | Pts | Promotion or relegation |
|---|---|---|---|---|---|---|---|---|---|---|
| 1 | Nice | 30 | 19 | 4 | 7 | 52 | 32 | +20 | 42 | Promoted |
| 2 | Red Star Paris | 30 | 15 | 11 | 4 | 54 | 28 | +26 | 41 | Promoted |
| 3 | Cannes | 30 | 15 | 10 | 5 | 59 | 35 | +24 | 40 | Promoted |
| 4 | Limoges | 30 | 16 | 5 | 9 | 47 | 31 | +16 | 37 | |
| 5 | US Boulogne | 30 | 15 | 6 | 9 | 49 | 37 | +12 | 36 | |
| 6 | Montpellier | 30 | 12 | 10 | 8 | 41 | 36 | +5 | 34 | |
| 7 | Grenoble | 30 | 12 | 7 | 11 | 36 | 50 | −14 | 31 | |
| 8 | Aix-en-Provence | 30 | 12 | 5 | 13 | 33 | 29 | +4 | 29 | |
| 9 | FC Metz | 30 | 11 | 8 | 11 | 42 | 43 | −1 | 30 | |
| 10 | Stade Reims | 30 | 12 | 5 | 13 | 54 | 38 | +16 | 29 | |
| 11 | Cherbourg | 30 | 9 | 11 | 10 | 40 | 45 | −5 | 29 | |
| 12 | RC Paris | 30 | 10 | 4 | 16 | 36 | 48 | −12 | 24 | |
| 13 | Besançon | 30 | 8 | 6 | 16 | 35 | 54 | −19 | 22 | |
| 14 | Olympique Marseille | 30 | 7 | 7 | 16 | 26 | 38 | −12 | 21 | |
| 15 | Forbach | 30 | 7 | 6 | 17 | 30 | 56 | −26 | 20 | |
| 16 | Béziers | 30 | 4 | 6 | 20 | 18 | 61 | −43 | 14 | |

Source: rsssf.com
