= Jean-Louis Lagadec =

French footballer (1933–2012)

Personal information
- Date of birth: 23 May 1933
- Place of birth: Le Havre, France
- Date of death: 6 October 2012 (aged 79)
- Position: Left-back

Senior career*
Years	Team	Apps	(Gls)
1956–1961	Le Havre		
1963–1964	Racing Paris		
1965–1967	Bastia		
1967–1970	Chalon		

Managerial career
- 1967–1974: Chalon
- 1981–1982: Lorient
- * Club domestic league appearances and goals

Jean-Louis Lagadec (23 May 1933 – 3 October 2012) was a French professional football player and coach.

== Career ==
Born in Le Havre, Lagadec played club football as a left-back for Le Havre, Racing Paris, Bastia and Chalon; he was also manager of the latter club.

== Later life and death ==
Lagadec died on 3 October 2012.
