= 1969–70 French Division 2 =

31st season of the second-tier football league in France

Division 2
- Season: 1969–70

Statistics of Division 2 in the 1969/1970 season.

== Overview ==
It was contested by 16 teams, and Nice won the championship.

== League standings ==
Pos	Team	Pld	W	D	L	GF	GA	GD	Pts	Promotion or relegation
1	Nice	30	19	8	3	54	18	+36	46	Promoted
2	Nancy	30	20	5	5	77	31	+46	45	Promoted
3	Avignon	30	16	8	6	60	26	+34	40	
4	Stade Reims	30	16	5	9	44	31	+13	37	Promoted
5	Grenoble	30	13	10	7	55	36	+19	36	
6	US Boulogne	30	14	6	10	38	35	+3	34	
7	Gazélec Ajaccio	30	12	5	13	42	39	+3	29	
8	AS Monaco	30	10	8	12	38	44	−6	28	
9	Dunkerque	30	10	7	13	30	42	−12	27	
10	Lorient	30	9	7	14	32	37	−5	25	
11	Paris Neuilly	30	7	11	12	28	37	−9	25	
12	Aix-en-Provence	30	9	7	14	36	64	−28	25	
13	Cannes	30	8	8	14	28	49	−21	24	
14	Toulon	30	8	4	18	32	51	−19	20	
15	Besançon	30	8	4	18	30	53	−23	20	
16	Limoges	30	7	5	18	32	63	−31	19	

Source: rsssf.com
