= OGC Nice =

Association football club in France

Nice
- Full name: Olympique Gymnaste Club de Nice
- Nicknames: Les Aiglons (The Eaglets); Le Gym (The Gym)
- Founded: 9 July 1904; 122 years ago
- Stadium: Allianz Riviera
- Capacity: 36,178
- Owner: Ineos
- President: Maurice Cohen
- Head coach: Olivier Pantaloni
- League: Ligue 1
- 2025–26: Ligue 1, 16th of 18
- Website: www.ogcnice.com
Home colours	Away colours

Olympique Gymnaste Club de Nice (French pronunciation: [ɔlɛ̃pik ʒimnast klœb də nis]), commonly referred to as OGC Nice or simply Nice, is a French professional football club based in Nice. The club was founded in 1904 and currently plays in Ligue 1, the top tier of French football. Nice plays its home matches at the Allianz Riviera.

Nice was founded under the name Gymnaste Club de Nice and is one of the founding members of the first division of French football. The club has won Ligue 1 four times, the Trophée des Champions once and the Coupe de France three times. It achieved most of its honours in the 1950s with the club being managed by coaches such as Numa Andoire, Englishman William Berry, and Jean Luciano. The club's last honour was winning the Coupe de France in 1997 after defeating Guingamp 4–3 on penalties in the final. Nice's colours are red and black.

During the club's successful run in the 1950s, Nice was among the first French clubs to successfully integrate international players into the fold. Notable players include Héctor de Bourgoing, Pancho Gonzales, Victor Nurenberg, and Joaquín Valle, the latter being the club's all-time leading goalscorer and arguably the greatest player.

== History ==
Gymnaste Club 'Azur was founded in the residential district of Les Baumettes on 9 July 1904 under the name Gymnaste Club. The club was founded by Marquis de Massingy d'Auzac, who served as president of the Fédération Sportive des Alpes-Maritimes (lit. 'Alpes-Maritimes Sporting Federation'). Akin to its name, the club primarily focused on the sports of gymnastics and athletics. On 6 July 1908, in an effort to remain affiliated with the FSAM and also join the amateur federation USFSA, the head of French football at the time, Gymnaste Club de Nice split into two sections with the new section of the club being named Gymnastes Amateurs Club de Nice. The new section spawned a football club and, after two seasons, the two clubs merged. On 20 September 1919, Nice merged with the local club Gallia Football Athlétic Club and, subsequently, adopted the club's red and black combination. In 1920, the club was playing in the Ligue du Sud-Est, a regional league under the watch of the French Football Federation. While playing in the league, Nice developed rivalries with Cannes and Marseille. On 22 December 1924, the club changed its name to Olympique Gymnaste Club de Nice.

In July 1930, the National Council of the French Football Federation voted 128–20 in support of professionalism in French football. Nice, along with most clubs from southern France, were among the first clubs to adopt the new statute and subsequently became professional and were founding members of the new league. In the league's inaugural season, Nice finished seventh in its group. In the following season, Nice finished 13th and were relegated from the league. The club did not play league football in the ensuing season and returned to French football in 1936, playing in Division 2. Nice spent the next three years playing in the second division. In 1939, professional football in France was abolished due to World War II. Nonetheless, Nice continued to play league football under amateur status with the club participating in the Ligue du Sud-Est in 1939 and the Ligue du Sud in the following seasons.

After World War II, Nice returned to professional status and was inserted back into the second division. The club achieved promotion back to the first division for the 1948–49 season under the leadership of the Austrian manager Anton Marek. After two seasons of finishing in the top ten, Nice, now led by manager Jean Lardi, achieved its first-ever honour by winning the league title in the 1950–51 season. Bolstered by French internationals Marcel Domingo, Antoine Bonifaci, Abdelaziz Ben Tifour, and Jean Courteaux, as well as the Argentine duo of Pancho Gonzales and Luis Carniglia and the Swede Pär Bengtsson, Nice won the league despite finishing equal on points with Lille. Nice was declared champions due to having more wins (18) than Lille (17). In the following season, under new manager Numa Andoire, Nice won the double after winning both the league and the Coupe de France. In the league, the club defended its title by holding off both Bordeaux and Lille. In the Coupe de France final, Nice faced Bordeaux and defeated the Aquitaine club 5–3 courtesy of goals from five different players.

Nice continued its solid run in the decade by winning the Coupe de France for the second time in 1954. The club, now being led by a young and unknown Just Fontaine, faced southern rivals Marseille and earned a 2–1 victory with Victor Nuremberg and Carniglia scoring the goals. Carniglia retired from football after the season and began managing Nice. In his first season in charge, Nice won the league for a third time after being chased for the entire season by rivals Marseille and Monaco, as well as Lens and Saint-Étienne. After the campaign, Fontaine departed the club for Stade de Reims. Three seasons later, Nice won the last title of the decade in 1959. The club finished the decade (1950–1959) with four league titles and two Coupe de France trophies. Nice also appeared in European competition for the first time in the 1956–57 season, losing to Real Madrid in the quarter-finals.

In subsequent decades, Nice struggled to equal the success of the 1950s with Reims and, later Saint-Étienne eclipsing the club in the 1960s and '70s. During this time, Nice regularly competed in Division 1 with the exception of two seasons in Division 2 in 1965 and 1970. In 1973 and 1976, Nice achieved a second-place finish in the league, its best finish since winning the league in 1959. However, following the latter finish, the club finished in lower positions in the next six seasons and was relegated in the 1981–82 season after finishing 19th. Nice played three seasons in the second division before returning to the top flight in 1985. After six seasons of mid-table finishes, Nice was back in Division 2.

In 1997, Nice, now back in the first division, stunned many after winning the Coupe de France. However, the victory did not shock most French football enthusiasts mainly due to the club's competition in the run-up to the final in which Nice faced only Division 2 clubs, except for first division club Bastia. In the final, Nice defeated Guingamp 5–4 on penalties to earn cup success. On a more sour note, in the 1996–97 season, Nice were relegated from the first division (predecessor of Ligue 1) only days after winning the Coupe de France, finishing last in the league.

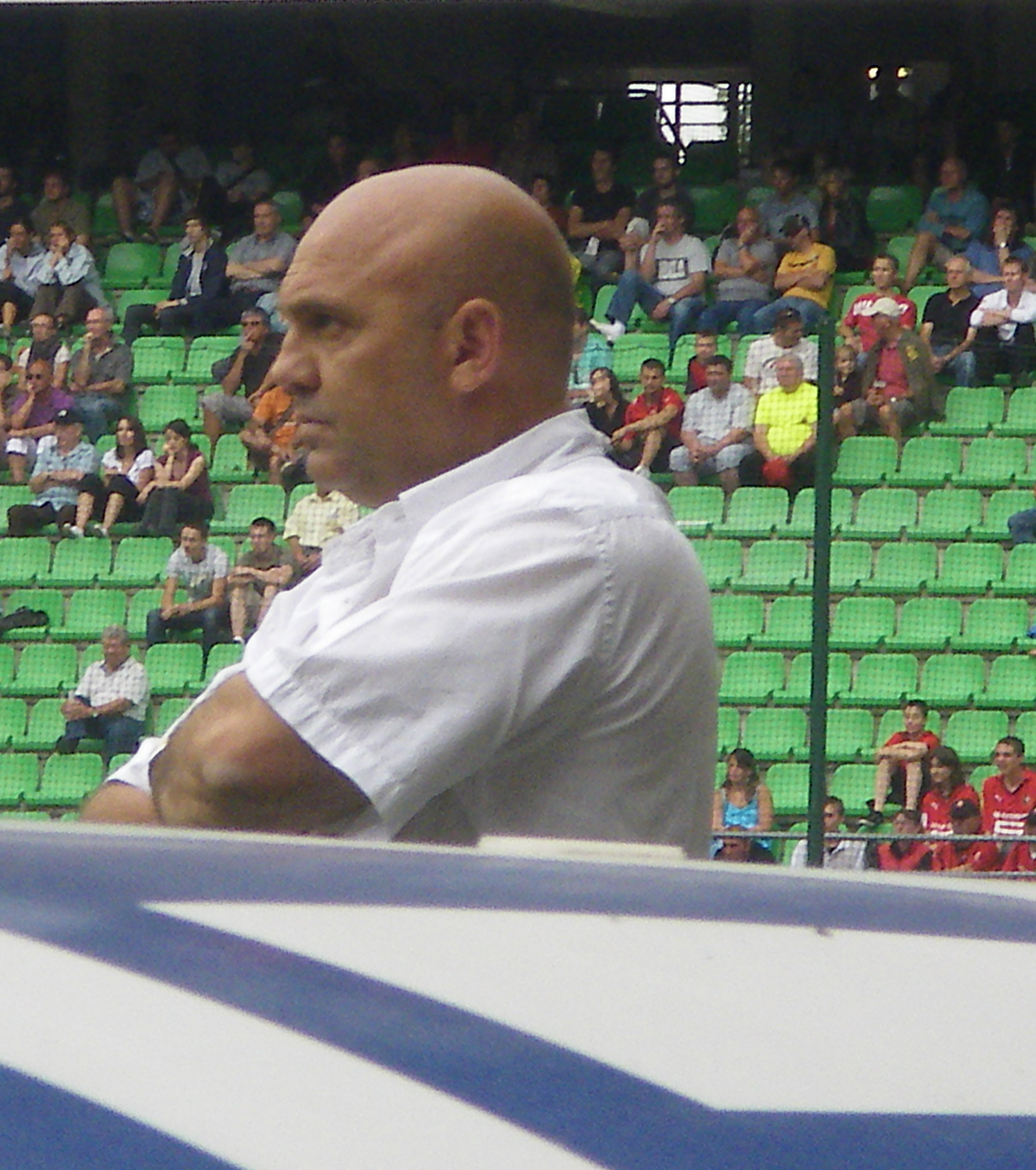
Frédéric Antonetti led Nice to the 2006 Coupe de la Ligue final.

The club spent five seasons in Ligue 2 and returned to Ligue 1 for the 2002–03 season. In the lead-up to the season, Nice failed to meet the financial requirements set by the DNCG and was subsequently relegated to the Championnat National, the third level of French football. However, after achieving stability, mainly due to selling a few players, Nice was allowed into Ligue 1 after successfully appealing.

In the 2005–06 season, Nice made it to the final of the Coupe de la Ligue in 2006, losing to Nancy 2–1.

In June 2016, a Chinese and American consortium led by Chien Lee of NewCity Capital and Alex Zheng purchased 80% of the club. Chien Lee and Alex Zheng held a 78% stake, while Paul Conway's Pacific Media Group (PMG) owned the remaining 2%, Jean-Pierre Rivere retained a 20% stake in the club. Chien Lee subsequently became the chairman of the board In the 2016–17 Ligue 1 season, Nice finished third in the final standings and qualified for the third round of the UEFA Champions League.

On 11 June 2018, Patrick Vieira was announced as Nice manager, replacing Lucien Favre. In the 2018–19 season, Nice finished in 7th place in the league.

In July 2019, it was announced that Jim Ratcliffe acquired the French club for a reported €100 million.

After a run of poor form saw Nice sitting in 11th place in Ligue 1 and eliminated from the Europa League, manager Patrick Vieira was sacked. Vieira's assistant, Adrian Ursea, took over as caretaker. Nice finished the 2020–21 Ligue 1 season in ninth place in the league.

On 28 June 2021, Christophe Galtier was appointed as the new head coach. On 27 June 2022, Lucien Favre returned to Nice as manager. After a complicated first part of the season, Lucien Favre was fired. He was replaced by the coach of the reserve team Didier Digard. For the following season, Francesco Farioli was appointed as the next head coach.

In the 2023–24 Ligue 1 season, Nice qualified for the UEFA Europa League finishing in 5th place in the league.

=== 2025-2026: A potential sale ===
In 2025, OGC Nice was placed on the market by its owner Jim Ratcliffe, who acquired the club in 2019. The sale process has been overseen by the advisory firm Lazard. In January 2026, Ratcliffe reportedly reduced the club's asking price, initially set at over €200 million, after failing to attract a buyer at the original valuation. The revised valuation was reported to be below €200 million, reflecting broader market conditions and the challenges of selling a top-tier French football club.

== Home stadium ==
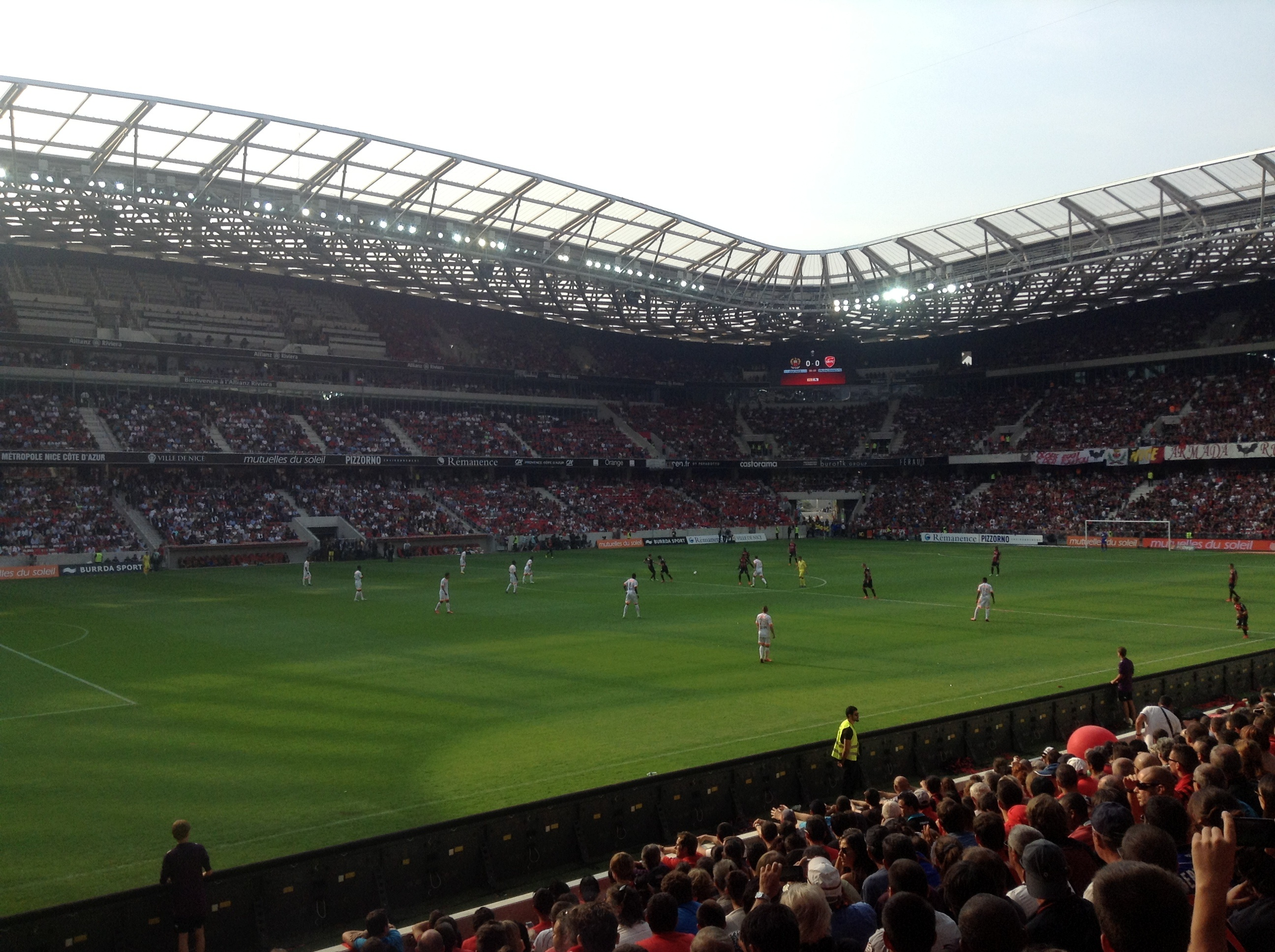
Nice moved to the Allianz Riviera in September 2013

From 1927 until 2013, Nice played its home matches at the Stade du Ray. The stadium is, however, officially known as the Stade Léo-Lagrange, named after a French politician who had a stint in politics as the assistant secretary of state for sport. The Stade du Ray went through many renovations, most recently in 1997 and had a capacity of 17,415. The stadium was popular with supporters for being located in the centre of the city, but suffered from its old structure and small capacity, as the Nice metropolitan area has over one million residents.

Nice began to attempt to build a new stadium in 2002. In its first attempt, the club was heavily criticised by local politicians who questioned the usefulness and format of the stadium. Despite the critics, however, the club's proposition passed and excavation of the site in the plain of Var, at Nice-Lingostière, began in July 2006. The Tribunal administration of Nice cancelled the project for irregularities committed concerning the fixation of the price of tickets. In October 2008, the new deputy mayor of Nice, Christian Estrosi, declared that Nice would have a new stadium "no later than 2013". The new stadium was to be built at the same place as before, at Nice-Lingostière.

Stadium exterior

On 22 September 2009, French newspaper L'Équipe reported the Grand Stade Nice had been selected by the French Football Federation (FFF) as 1 of the 12 stadiums to be used in the country's bid to host UEFA Euro 2016. The FFF officially made its selections on 11 November 2009, and the city of Nice was selected as a site to host matches during the tournament. The construction of the Allianz Riviera started in 2011 and was completed in September 2013.

== Players ==
=== Current squad ===
As of 19 September 2026

Note: Flags indicate national team as defined under FIFA eligibility rules; some limited exceptions apply. Players may hold more than one non-FIFA nationality.

No.	Pos.	Nation	Player
2	DF	TUN	Ali Abdi
5	DF	EGY	Mohamed Abdelmonem
6	MF	ALG	Hicham Boudaoui
7	FW	FRA	Gauthier Hein
8	MF	FRA	Morgan Sanson (vice-captain)
9	FW	ALG	Mohamed Amoura (on loan from VfL Wolfsburg)
10	FW	MAR	Sofiane Diop
11	FW	CIV	Elye Wahi (on loan from Eintracht Frankfurt)
19	MF	FRA	Laurent Abergel
21	FW	SWE	Isak Jansson
22	MF	GUI	Issiaga Camara
23	GK	SEN	Yehvann Diouf
27	DF	FRA	Niels Nkounkou (on loan from Eintracht Frankfurt)
28	MF	BEL	Axel Witsel
29	FW	CMR	Nathan Ngoumou

No.	Pos.	Nation	Player
33	DF	SEN	Antoine Mendy
34	MF	FRA	Nassim Laarej
35	DF	FRA	Xavier Mandza
36	DF	GHA	Alidu Seidu (on loan from Rennes)
39	MF	FRA	Djibril Coulibaly
44	FW	FRA	Zoumana Diallo
55	DF	BDI	Youssouf Ndayishimiye
60	GK	FRA	Martin Ponsot
64	DF	CAN	Moïse Bombito
77	GK	ALG	Teddy Boulhendi
84	DF	MAR	Hamza Koutoune
87	MF	FRA	Everton Pereira
92	DF	FRA	Jonathan Clauss
99	MF	GHA	Salis Abdul Samed

=== Reserve squad ===
Note: Flags indicate national team as defined under FIFA eligibility rules; some limited exceptions apply. Players may hold more than one non-FIFA nationality.

No. / Pos. / Nation / Player; 38 / MF / MTN / Aboulaye Camara	No. / Pos. / Nation / Player; 41 / FW / FRA / Djelan Morana

=== Out on loan ===
Note: Flags indicate national team as defined under FIFA eligibility rules; some limited exceptions apply. Players may hold more than one non-FIFA nationality.

No.	Pos.	Nation	Player
—	DF	FRA	Melvin Bard (at Leeds United until 30 June 2027)
—	DF	CGO	Brad Mantsounga (at Virton until 30 June 2027)

No.	Pos.	Nation	Player
—	FW	ESP	Kevin Carlos (at Cagliari until 30 June 2027)
—	FW	NGR	Victor Orakpo (at Gençlerbirliği until 30 June 2027)

=== Retired numbers ===
Note: Flags indicate national team as defined under FIFA eligibility rules; some limited exceptions apply. Players may hold more than one non-FIFA nationality.

No.	Pos.	Nation	Player
17	MF	FRA	Kévin Anin

=== Notable former players ===
Below are notable former players who have represented Nice in league and international competition since the club's foundation in 1904.

For a complete list of OGC Nice players, see Category:OGC Nice players

France

- (France) Marcel Aubour
- (France) Dominique Baratelli
- (France) Éric Bauthéac
- (France) Hatem Ben Arfa
- (France) Daniel Bravo
- (France) André Chorda
- (France) José Cobos
- (France) Carlos Curbelo
- (France) Wylan Cyprien
- (France) Héctor De Bourgoing
- (France) Didier Digard
- (France) Olivier Echouafni
- (France) Patrice Evra
- (France) Valentin Eysseric
- (France) Koczur Ferry
- (France) Jacques Foix
- (France) Just Fontaine
- (France) Jean-Marc Guillou
- (France) Jean-Noël Huck
- (France) Roger Jouve
- (France) Charles Marchetti
- (France) Pierre Lees-Melou
- (France) Hugo Lloris
- (France) Charly Loubet
- (France) Jean Luciano
- (France) Marc Molitor
- (France) Alassane Pléa
- (France) Loïc Rémy
- (France) Malang Sarr
- (France) Joseph Ujlaki

Argentina

- (Argentina) Walter Benítez
- (Argentina) Renato Civelli
- (Argentina) Darío Cvitanich

Brazil

- (Brazil) Ederson

Colombia

- (Colombia) David Ospina

Denmark

- (Denmark) Kasper Dolberg
- (Denmark) Kasper Schmeichel

Dominican Republic

- (Dominican Republic) Pablo Rosario

Haiti

- (Haiti) Romain Genevois

Italy

- (Italy) Mario Balotelli

Ivory Coast

- (Ivory Coast) Bakari Koné
- (Ivory Coast) Jean Michaël Seri

Luxembourg

- (Luxembourg) Victor Nurenberg

Mali

- (Mali) Cédric Kanté
- (Mali) Mahamane Traoré

Netherlands

- (Netherlands) Wesley Sneijder

Poland

- (Poland) Marcin Bułka

Portugal

- (Portugal) Ricardo Pereira

Senegal

- (Senegal) Nampalys Mendy

Serbia

- (Serbia) Nemanja Pejčinović

Spain

- (Spain) Josep Samitier
- (Spain) Joaquín Valle

Sweden

- (Sweden) Leif Eriksson

Yugoslavia

- (Socialist Federal Republic of Yugoslavia) Nenad Bjeković
- (Socialist Federal Republic of Yugoslavia) Marko Elsner
- (Socialist Federal Republic of Yugoslavia) Josip Katalinski

== Management and staff ==
=== Club officials ===
Senior club staff

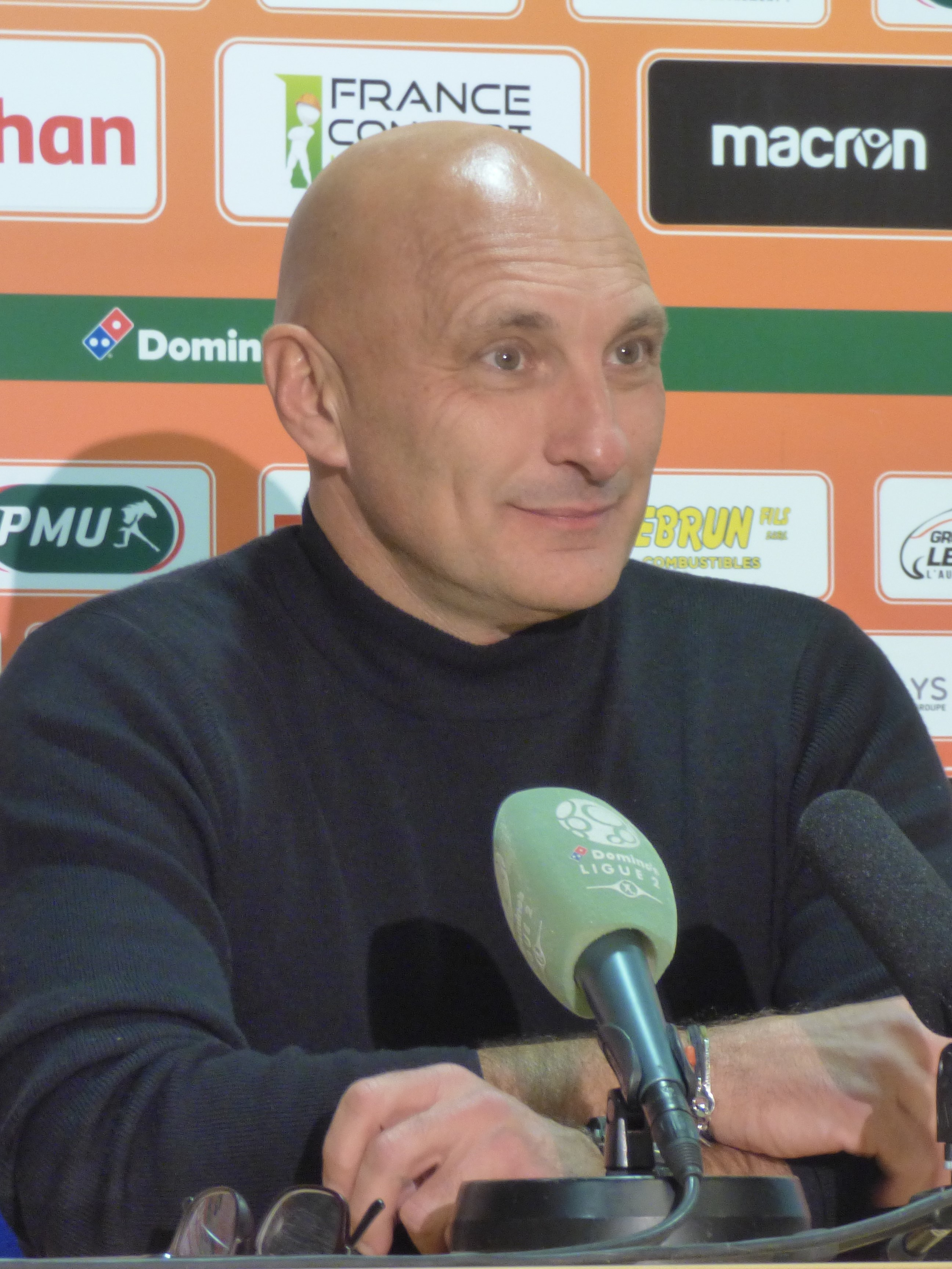
Olivier Pantaloni is the current head coach of the club

- Owner(s): Ineos
- President: Maurice Cohen
- Sporting director: Vacant
- Head coach: Olivier Pantaloni
- Assistant coach: Julien Sablé, Cédric Varrault
- Goalkeeper coach: Stéphane Cassard
- Fitness coach: Christopher Juras, Sébastien Sangnier, Maxime Verdier, Ghislain Dubois
- Video Analyst: Sebastien Besombes
- Chief Analyst: Alexandre Pasquini
- Match Analyst: Kevin Jeffries

=== Coaching history ===
Dates	Coach
1932–1933	(Scotland) Jim McDewitt
1933–1934	(Austria) Hans Tandler (Switzerland) Edmond Kramer (interim) (Scotland) Charlie Bell
1935–1937	(France) Emmanuel Lowy
1937	(Czechoslovakia) Karel Kudrna
1937–1938	(Spain) Ricardo Zamora
1938–1939	(Spain) Josep Samitier
1945–1946	(Spain) Luis Valle
1946	(France) Maurice Castro
1946–1947	(Italy) Giovanni Lardi
1947–1949	(Austria) Anton Marek
1949–1950	(France) Émile Veinante
1950	(France) Elie Rous
1950–1951	(Italy) Giovanni Lardi
1951–1952	(France) Numa Andoire
1952–1953	(France) Mario Zatelli
1953–1955	(England) Bill Berry
1955–1957	(Argentina) Luis Carniglia
1957–1962	(France) Jean Luciano
1962–1964	(France) Numa Andoire
1964–1969	(Argentina) Pancho Gonzales
1969–1971	(France) Léon Rossi

Dates	Coach
1971–1974	(France) Jean Snella
1974–1976	(Socialist Federal Republic of Yugoslavia) Vlatko Marković
1976–1977	(France) Jean-Marc Guillou
1977–1978	(France) Léon Rossi
1978–1979	(Hungary) Koczur Ferry
1979	(France) Albert Batteux
1979–1980	(France) Léon Rossi
1980–1981	(Socialist Federal Republic of Yugoslavia) Vlatko Marković
1981–1982	(France) Marcel Domingo
1982–1987	(France) Jean Sérafin
1987–1989	(Socialist Federal Republic of Yugoslavia) Nenad Bjeković
1989	(France) Pierre Alonzo
1989–1990	(Argentina) Carlos Bianchi
1990	(France) Jean Fernandez
1990–1992	(France) Jean-Noël Huck
1992–1996	(France) Albert Emon
1996	(France) Daniel Sanchez
1996–1997	(Federal Republic of Yugoslavia) Silvester Takač
1997–1998	(Belgium) Michel Renquin
1998	(Federal Republic of Yugoslavia) Silvester Takač
1998–1999	(France) Victor Zvunka
1999–2000	(France) Guy David
2000–2002	(Italy) Sandro Salvioni

Dates	Coach
2002–2005	(Germany) Gernot Rohr
2005	(France) Gérard Buscher (interim)
2005–2009	(France) Frédéric Antonetti
2009–2010	(France) Didier Ollé-Nicolle
2010–2011	(France) Eric Roy
2011–2012	(France) René Marsiglia
2012–2016	(France) Claude Puel
2016–2018	(Switzerland) Lucien Favre
2018–2020	(France) Patrick Vieira
2020–2021	(Romania) Adrian Ursea
2021–2022	(France) Christophe Galtier
2022–2023	(Switzerland) Lucien Favre
2023	(France) Didier Digard (interim)
2023–2024	(Italy) Francesco Farioli
2024–2025	(France) Franck Haise
2025–2026	(France) Claude Puel (interim)
2026–present	(France) Olivier Pantaloni

== Honours ==
=== Domestic ===
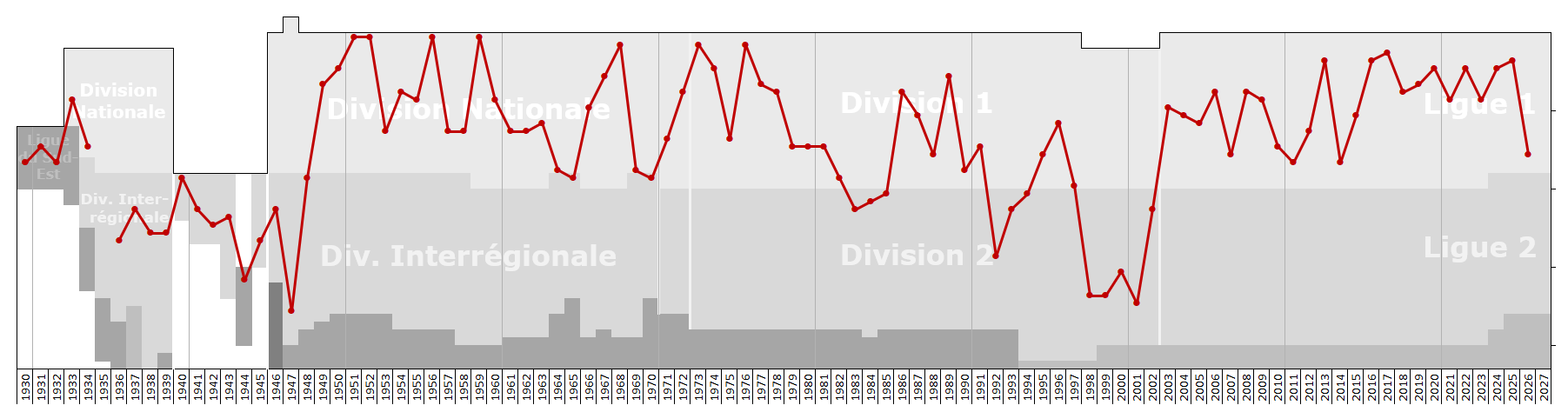
Historical league performance chart of OGC Nice

- Ligue 1
  - Champions (4): 1950–51, 1951–52, 1955–56, 1958–59
  - Runners-up (3): 1967–68, 1972–73, 1975–76
- Ligue 2
  - Champions (4): 1947–48, 1964–65, 1969–70, 1993–94
  - Runners-up (1): 1984–85
- Division 3 (Reserves)
  - Champions (2): 1984–85, 1988–89
- Coupe de France
  - Champions (3): 1951–52, 1953–54, 1996–97
  - Runners-up (3): 1977–78, 2021–22, 2025–26
- Coupe de la Ligue
  - Runners-up (1): 2005–06
- Trophee des Champions
  - Champions (1): 1970
  - Runners-up (3): 1956, 1959, 1997

=== Other ===
- Latin Cup
  - Runners-up (1): 1952

== Sponsors ==
=== Main sponsor ===
- (United States) Robinhood Markets

=== Kit sponsor ===
- (Italy) Kappa
