= 1980 Coupe de France final =

- Event: 1979–80 Coupe de France
| Monaco | Orléans |
| 3 | 1 |
- Date: 7 June 1980
- Venue: Parc des Princes, Paris
- Referee: Georges Konrath
- Attendance: 46,136

The 1980 Coupe de France final was a football match held at Parc des Princes, Paris, on 7 June 1980 that saw AS Monaco FC defeat US Orléans of Division 2 3–1 thanks to goals by Albert Emon and Delio Onnis.

== Match details ==
7 June 1980

| Monaco | 3–1 | Orléans |
|---|---|---|
| Marette 6' (o.g.); Emon 47'; Onnis 66' | | Marette 24' |

Parc des Princes, Paris
Attendance: 46,136
Referee: Georges Konrath

| GK | (France) Jean-Luc Ettori |
| DF | (France) Daniel Zorzetto |
| DF | (France) Alfred Vitalis |
| DF | (France) Bernard Gardon |
| DF | (France) Alain Moizan |
| MF | (France) Roger Ricort | | (substituted off) 55' |
| MF | (France) Albert Emon | | (substituted off) 78' |
| MF | (France) Jean Petit | (c) |
| FW | (France) Christian Dalger |
| FW | (France) Didier Christophe |
| FW | (Argentina) Delio Onnis |
Substitutes:
| FW | (Cameroon) Roger Milla | | (substituted on) 55' |
| DF | (France) Thierry Ninot | | (substituted on) 78' |
Manager:
(France) Gérard Banide

| GK | (France) Patrick Viot |
| DF | (France) Pascal Drouet |
| DF | (France) Yannick Plissonneau |
| DF | (France) André Bodji |
| DF | (France) Jacques Lemée | (c) |
| MF | (France) Bruno Germain |
| MF | (France) Roger Marette | | (substituted off) 81' |
| MF | (France) Michel Albaladéjo |
| FW | (Socialist Federal Republic of Yugoslavia) Ante Hameršmit | | (substituted off) 81' |
| FW | (Zaire) Joseph Loukaka |
| FW | (France) Loïc Berthouloux |
Substitutes:
| MF | (France) Jacques Froissart | | (substituted on) 81' |
| FW | (France) Philippe Helbert | | (substituted on) 81' |
Manager:
(France) Jacques Lemée

== See also ==
- 1979–80 Coupe de France
