= Ante Hameršmit =

Croatian footballer and manager

Personal information
- Date of birth: 2 June 1949 (age 77)
- Place of birth: Senj, SR Croatia, Yugoslavia
- Height: 1.78 m (5 ft 10 in)
- Position: Forward

Senior career*
Years	Team	Apps	(Gls)
1972–1973	Spartak Subotica		
1974	Proleter Zrenjanin	8	(0)
1975	Hajduk Split		
1975–1979	Limoges		
1979–1981	Orléans	38	(8)
1981–1983	Le Mans		

International career
1971	Yugoslav Olympic team	2	(1)

Managerial career
- 2002–2007: Sablé FC
- * Club domestic league appearances and goals

Ante Hameršmit (born 2 June 1949) is a Croatian football manager and former player. A forward, he made his career in Yugoslavia and France. His name was usually referred to in Yugoslavia as Ante Hameršmit, but abroad it was not unusual to see his also referred to either simply without diacritics, Ante Hamersmit, or as Ante Hamerschmit.

== Club career ==
Born in Senj, HR Croatia, Hameršmit started playing professionally in Serbian clubs Spartak Subotica and Proleter Zrenjanin before returning to Croatia and joining giants Hajduk Split.

In 1975 he moves abroad to France and joins Limoges where he played four seasons. Next, he signs with Orléans where he played two seasons before ending his career at Le Mans where he played for another two seasons until 1983.

== International career ==
Hameršmit made two appearances and scored one goal for Yugoslav Olympic team in 1971, and a year later he made one appearance as well for the Yugoslav amateur national team.

== Coaching career ==
Hameršmit was the main coach of French side Sablé FC between 2002 and 2007.

== Honours ==
Orleans

- Coupe de France runner-up: 1980
