= 2018–19 Coupe de France preliminary rounds, Bretagne =

The 2018–19 Coupe de France preliminary rounds, Bretagne was the qualifying competition to decide which teams from the leagues of the Bretagne region of France took part in the main competition from the seventh round.

== First round ==
These matches were played on 24, 25 and 26 August 2018.

|+ First round results: Bretagne |-

Tie no	Home team (tier)	Score	Away team (tier)
1.	CS Illifaut (10)	0–1	CS Lanrelas (9)
2.	Rah-Koëd Plaudren FC (10)	1–2	Semeurs de Grand-Champ (9)
3.	ES Ségliennaise (11)	1–5	Stade Guémenois (10)
4.	Portes du Couesnon FC (11)	4–0	US Sens-de-Bretagne (10)
5.	US Taulé (10)	1–2	AS Santec (8)
6.	Cadets de Plougoulm (11)	0–2	Stade Léonard Kreisker (9)
7.	AS St Vougay (10)	1–2	Paotred Rosko (9)
8.	ES Lampaulaise (10)	1–4	EF Plougourvest (9)
9.	US St Servais-St Derrien (11)	1–3	FC Lanhouarneau-Plounévez-Lochrist (9)
10.	US Rochoise (11)	0–6	AS Berven-Plouzévédé (9)
11.	FC Côte des Légendes (9)	0–5	CND Le Folgoët (8)
12.	ES Cranou (10)	1–4	FC Le Relecq-Kerhuon (8)
13.	RC Loperhet (11)	3–0	FA de la Rade (9)
14.	SC Lanrivoaré (10)	1–3	AS Guilers (8)
15.	AS Kersaint (9)	1–2 (a.e.t.)	ASPTT Brest (8)
16.	US Le Crouais (11)	0–1	JA Bréal (9)
17.	AS Parthenay-de-Bretagne (11)	2–3 (a.e.t.)	FC La Mézière-Melesse (9)
18.	USC Chavagne (9)	5–1	US Mordelles (8)
19.	US St Gilles (8)	3–1	FC Mosaïque (9)
20.	AS Ercé-près-Liffré (10)	3–3 (4–2 p)	FC Aubinois (8)
21.	US Illet Forêt (10)	4–2	CS Betton (9)
22.	US Corps-Nuds (10)	0–10	US Châteaugiron (8)
23.	Trégor FC (9)	2–1	Entente du Trieux FC (8)
24.	ES Rudonou (10)	0–2	US Pays Rochois (8)
25.	Étoile St Arzel (10)	3–0	Légion St Pierre (9)
26.	AL Coataudon (10)	3–0	ASC Mahoraise Brest (9)
27.	St Divy Sports (9)	3–5	Arzelliz Ploudalmézeau (9)
28.	AS Camaretoise (9)	2–4	ES Plogonnec (8)
29.	AS Diables du Juch (10)	3–4	US Crozon-Morgat (9)
30.	Ossé/St Aubin (10)	1–3	US Noyal-Chatillon (9)
31.	FC Tréméloir (11)	1–4	ES Pommerit-Le Merzer (9)
32.	St Brieuc Football Ouest (9)	1–4	FC Plouagat-Châtelaudren-Lanrodec (8)
33.	US Glomel (10)	0–2	US Argoat-Pélem (9)
34.	FC Poulancre-Múr-St Gilles (10)	0–4	Rostrenen FC (8)
35.	Lopérec Sport (10)	1–4	Lanvéoc Sports (9)
36.	AS Dinéault (12)	0–3 (Note: Tie won by forfeit.)	ES Gouézec (11)
37.	AS Pont-de-Buis (10)	1–5	Paotred Briec (8)
38.	Plouyé Magic United (11)	3–0	US Poullaouen (10)
39.	US Kergloff (11)	0–5	AC Carhaix (9)
40.	Toros Plounévézel (9)	0–4	Dernières Cartouches Carhaix (8)
41.	US St Hernin (12)	1–1 (1–3 p)	SS St Goazec (11)
42.	US Cléden-Poher (9)	0–2	Gourin FC (8)
43.	ES St Jean-Trolimon (11)	1–4 (a.e.t.)	AS Loctudy (10)
44.	La Raquette Tréméoc (9)	4–3	AS Plomelin (8)
45.	Combrit Ste Marine FC (10)	0–5	Plonéour FC (9)
46.	FC Rosporden (9)	2–3 (a.e.t.)	Amicale Ergué-Gabéric (8)
47.	Gas d'Ys Tréboul (10)	0–2	US Pluguffan (9)
48.	ES Névez (9)	0–3	AS Melgven (8)
49.	Hermine Concarnoise (9)	1–3	Stade Mellacois (8)
50.	ES Rédené (9)	2–2 (4–2 p)	US Quimperlé (8)
51.	Avenir Guiscriff (9)	1–0	US Le Faouët (8)
52.	US Lanvénégen (10)	1–9	FC Klegereg (9)
53.	US Berné (10)	1–4	AS Calanaise (9)
54.	Avenir du Pays Pourleth (11)	2–4	AS Priziac (10)
55.	ACS Bieuzy-les-Eaux (9)	0–3	FC Meslan (10)
56.	AS Kergrist (11)	2–1	US Rohannaise (10)
57.	SC Sournais (10)	0–2	FL Inguiniel (10)
58.	AS Kergonan (9)	2–2 (4–5 p)	AS Guermeur (10)
59.	US Nostang (10)	1–7	Riantec OC (9)
60.	Stade Landévantais (9)	3–0	Stade Gâvrais (10)
61.	Erdeven-Étel (10)	2–1	AS Belle-Île-en-Mer (9)
62.	AS Plouharnel (11)	2–4	AS Bélugas Belz (9)
63.	Carnac FC (9)	3–1	Avenir Ste Hélène (10)
64.	ES Crac'h (9)	0–0 (3–2 p)	US Ploeren (10)
65.	FC Locmariaquer-St Philibert (10)	1–3	AS Ménimur (8)
66.	Garde de l'Yvel Loyat (10)	0–4	Indépendante Mauronnaise (9)
67.	St Jean Sport (9)	0–2	Bleuets Néant-sur-Yvel (10)
68.	AS Brévelaise (10)	2–9	AS Moustoir-Ac (9)
69.	Mélécienne de Plumelec (10)	0–2	EFC St Jean Brévelay (8)
70.	Garde du Loch (9)	1–0	AS Monterblanc (8)
71.	Glaneurs de Notre Dame Lizio (10)	5–2	Cadets de Guéhenno (11)
72.	Ecureils Roc-St André (9)	6–2	AS Croix-Helléan (10)
73.	Caro/Missiriac AS (10)	0–7	Fondelienne Carentoir (9)
74.	AS Turcs de l'Ouest (10)	3–2	AS Meucon (9)
75.	AS Berrich-Lauzach (10)	4–6	AS St Eloi La Vraie-Croix (9)
76.	Gentienne Pluherlin (10)	1–3	FC St Perreux (9)
77.	Étoile de l'Oust St Congard-St Laurent (10)	0–1	CS St Gaudence Allaire (9)
78.	AS Le Tour-de-Parc (10)	2–5	ES St Avé (8)
79.	Volontaires d'Augan (10)	0–4	Enfants de Guer (8)
80.	AL Camors (10)	1–2	Plumelin Sports (8)
81.	AS La Gouesnière (9)	4–3	Pleurtuit Côte d'Emeraude (8)
82.	FC Plerguer/Roz-Landrieux (10)	0–3	AS Miniac-Morvan (8)
83.	La Mélorienne (10)	0–8	US Château-Malo (8)
84.	US St Guinoux (10)	1–0	US Baguer-Morvan (9)
85.	US La Baie La Fresnais (12)	0–3	AS St Coulomb (10)
86.	FC Sud Fougerais (9)	2–1 (a.e.t.)	US Billé-Javené (8)
87.	Entente Sens-Vieux-Vy Gahard (11)	0–2	FC Marcillé-Bazouges-St Remy-Noyal (10)
88.	Entente Parigné/Landéan (10)	1–4	FC Louvigné-La Bazouge (9)
89.	US St Jean-sur-Vilaine (10)	0–2	US Domagné-St Didier (9)
90.	Association Châtillon-en-Vendelais-Princé (10)	0–4	JA Balazé (8)
91.	Olympic Montreuil-Landavran (10)	0–3	US Val d'Izé (8)
92.	Châteaubourg FC (10)	2–2 (3–2 p)	Espérance de Rennes (8)
93.	Espéance Bréal-sous-Vitré (10)	0–3	Bleuets Le Pertre-Brielles-Gennes-St Cyr (9)
94.	ES Taillis-St Christophe (10)	3–0	US Erbrée-Mondevert (10)
95.	AS Étrelles (10)	2–1	Cadets Chelun Martigné-Ferchaud (10)
96.	FC Pays d'Anast (10)	1–4	Avenir Lieuron (9)
97.	US La Bosse-Saulnières (10)	1–2	OC Brétillien (11)
98.	Espérance Sixt-sur-Aff (10)	1–3	JA Pipriac (9)
99.	Hermine La Noë Blanche (10)	0–4	US Bain (8)
100.	US Bel Air (9)	1–2	US Janzé (8)
101.	Breizh Fobal Klub (10)	1–2	Cercle Paul Bert Gayeulles (9)
102.	AS Telgruc-sur-Mer (10)	3–1	Racing Cast-Porzay (10)
103.	AS Motreff (10)	0–7	PB Spézet (9)
104.	Zèbres de Trégourez (11)	0–4	St Thois Sports (10)
105.	Edern Sports (9)	3–3 (3–5 p)	Glaziks de Coray (8)
106.	AS Gâs de Leuhan (10)	1–2	ES Langolen (10)
107.	La Guerlesquinaise (10)	0–4	AS Scrignac (8)
108.	ES Berrien-Huelgoat (10)	0–3	ES St Thégonnec (8)
109.	US Pont-Meur Guimiliau (10)	2–5	Guiclan FC (8)
110.	Étoile Trégoroise Plougasnou (10)	2–3	US Plouigneau (9)
111.	Avenir Plourin (10)	0–3	ES Pleyber-Christ (9)
112.	Gars St Majan (10)	0–10	AS Plouvien (8)
113.	AS Ploumoguer (10)	1–8	ES Portsall Kersaint (8)
114.	JG Forestoise (10)	0–5	SC Lannilis (9)
115.	St Nic Sports (10)	1–4	Gas du Menez-Hom (9)
116.	Garde du Gohazé St Thuriau (10)	1–3	Garde St Eloi Kerfourn (9)
117.	FC Gueltas-St Gérand-St Gonnery (10)	0–6	CS Pluméliau (8)
118.	AS Gestel (9)	2–0	FC Kerzec (10)
119.	Stade Hennebontais (10)	1–5	FC Ploemeur (8)
120.	Entente St Gilloise (11)	6–4 (a.e.t.)	Garde Ste Anne Branderion (10)
121.	AS Pluvignoise (9)	2–3 (a.e.t.)	Guénin Sport (8)
122.	US Brech (9)	6–1	Lanester FC (10)
123.	ASC Ste Anne-d'Auray (11)	1–2 (a.e.t.)	CS Pluneret (10)
124.	ES Mériadec (10)	4–1	Avenir Plumergat (11)
125.	AS Plougoumelen-Bono (9)	2–4	US Arradon (8)
126.	Vigilante Radenac (10)	0–4	CS Josselin (9)
127.	Garde St Arnould St Allouestre (11)	0–5	La Locminoise (10)
128.	La Sérentaise (10)	1–10	Aurore de Taupont (9)
129.	Montagnards Sulniac (9)	2–1 (a.e.t.)	Ajoncs d'Or St Nolff (10)
130.	US Le Cours (9)	7–2	Chevaliers St Maurice St Guyomard (10)
131.	ES Larré-Molac (10)	2–4	Ruffiac-Malestroit (8)
132.	St Léon de Glénac (11)	0–4	St Sébastien Caden (9)
133.	Espoir St Jacut-les-Pins (10)	2–1	JF Noyal-Muzillac (9)
134.	Muzillac OS (9)	2–0	AG Arzal (10)
135.	ES Tréflez (11)	1–2	St Pierre Plouescat (9)
136.	Les Fougerêts-St Martin-sur-Oust (9)	1–0	La Patriote Malansac (8)
137.	ES St Aubin-des-Landes/EF Cornillé (11)	2–3	Haute Vilaine FC (10)
138.	ES Boistrudan-Piré (11)	2–2 (3–4 p)	Torcé-Vergéal FC (10)
139.	Lapins de Guengat (10)	2–0	US Portugais Quimper (10)
140.	AS Kernével (11)	1–0	US Querrien (10)
141.	Gars de Plomeur (10)	2–4	FC Treffiagat-Guilvinec (9)
142.	US Île-Tudy (10)	0–10	Espoir Clohars Fouesnant (9)
143.	FC Aven-Bélon (10)	2–1	US Clohars-Carnoët (9)
144.	US St Thurien (11)	4–2	AS St Yvi (10)
145.	Coquelicots du Trévoux (11)	0–2	AS Tréméven (11)
146.	Damgan-Ambon Sport (9)	3–1	Sarzeau FC (8)
147.	AS Arzon (11)	0–9	Garde du Pont Marzan (8)
148.	Hermine Locoal-Mendon (10)	1–7	Plouhinec FC (9)
149.	Garde de la Mi-Voie (10)	0–3	Avenir St Servant-sur-Oust (8)
150.	Brocéliande Campénéac (10)	1–4	US St Abraham Chapelle-Caro (8)
151.	US St Armel (10)	2–3	US Laillé (8)
152.	US Médréac (9)	2–1	SEP Quédillac (9)
153.	Étoile du Leff Boqueho (9)	1–0	Pordic-Binic FC (8)
154.	UO Trégor (9)	2–1	Pléhédel Sports (10)
155.	ES Plougrasienne (11)	3–5	Écureuils de Plourivo (10)
156.	US Callac (10)	0–4	US Briacine (9)
157.	AS Plestinaise (11)	4–3	US Trieux-Lézardrieux-Pleudaniel (10)
158.	CS Trégastel (10)	1–3	JS Cavan (8)
159.	ES Frout St Agathon (10)	0–3 (a.e.t.)	US Pluzunet-Tonquédec (9)
160.	Stade Kénanais (11)	3–1 (a.e.t.)	US Méné Bré Louargat (10)
161.	JA Penvénan (10)	4–4 (7–8 p)	AS Pabu (11)
162.	FC Lizildry (11)	3–0	BO Caouennec-Lanvézéac (11)
163.	CS Croix Lambert (10)	2–4	US St Donan (10)
164.	AS Plussulien (11)	0–0 (2–4 p)	AS Kérien-Magoar (10)
165.	FC La Croix-Corlay (9)	4–1	US Plouguernével (10)
166.	AS Blavet (10)	0–3	US St Caradec (9)
167.	AS Plenaltais (10)	1–3	FC L'Hermitage Lorge (11)
168.	AS Trémuson (9)	1–2	St Brandan-Quintin FC (8)
169.	AS St Barnabé (11)	2–1	AS Trévé Sports (10)
170.	AS Trébry (10)	1–3	AS Motterieux (9)
171.	US Mené Le Gouray (10)	0–6	Vigilante Plémet (9)
172.	ALSL Plémy (11)	1–4	Étoile Sud Armor Porhoët (10)
173.	JS Landéhen (9)	3–0	CS Merdrignac (8)
174.	AS Broons-Trémeur (9)	3–1	Stade Évrannais (8)
175.	ES St Cast-le-Guildo (10)	0–2	US Brusvily (9)
176.	US Chapelloise (11)	2–3	FC Baulon-Lassy (10)
177.	Hermine de Renac (11)	1–3	US Ste Marie (10)
178.	US Bécherel/Minias-sous-Bécherel (10)	1–6	Avenir Irodouër (8)
179.	SC Mahorais Rennes (10)	1–2	FC Beauregard Rennes (9)
180.	FC Chapelle-Cintré (11)	4–1	AS St Jacques (10)
181.	US Acigné (9)	0–1	Domloup Sport (8)
182.	ES Le Fœil (9)	2–3	Plérin FC (8)
183.	UF Yffiniac (10)	1–0	AS St Herve (8)
184.	La Plœucoise Foot (10)	3–6 (a.e.t.)	FC St Bugan (8)
185.	FC Moncontour-Trédaniel (9)	1–3	Laurmené FC (8)
186.	ES Hénansal-St Denoual-La Bouillie Emeraude (10)	1–2 (a.e.t.)	AS Hillion-St René (8)
187.	US Hunaudaye (9)	0–2	Gouessant Foot Coëtmieux-Andel-Morieux-Pommeret (10)
188.	FC Côte de Penthièvre (10)	6–2	FC Beaussais-Rance-Frémur (9)
189.	US Yvignac-la-Tour (10)	0–1	US Trémorel (9)
190.	Val d'Arguenon Créhen-Pluduno (9)	2–2 (1–2 p)	US Frémur-Fresnaye (8)
191.	Rance Coëtquen Football (10)	2–3	FC Plélan Vildé Corseul (9)
192.	US Lanvallay (10)	1–2	US Plouasne-St Juvat (9)
193.	FC Plouezoc'h (10)	0–3	ES Carantec-Henvic (8)
194.	Gâs de Plouider (10)	1–3	ES Plounéventer (9)
195.	AS Sizun-Le Tréhou (10)	3–1 (a.e.t.)	Stade Landernéen Kergrèis (9)
196.	US Pencran (10)	1–5	ES Mignonne (9)
197.	Avel Vor St Pabu (10)	0–2	Espérance Plouguerneau (8)
198.	US Aber-Benoît Tréglonou (11)	1–6	Hermine Kernilis (9)
199.	FC Le Drennec (11)	1–2 (a.e.t.)	Étoile St Edern (9)
200.	ES Locmaria-Plouzané (9)	0–3	AS Dirinon (9)
201.	Stade Pleybennois (9)	2–3 (a.e.t.)	Gars de Plonévez-du-Faou (9)
202.	AS Laz (12)	4–4 (2–4 p)	US Lennon (10)
203.	ES Plonéis (11)	4–0	Tricolores Landrévarzec (10)
204.	ES Beuzec (9)	1–1 (4–3 p)	AS Plouhinécoise (8)
205.	AS Gars de Poullan (10)	0–3	FC Penn-ar-Bed (9)
206.	FC Odet (9)	2–3	Quimper Ergué-Armel FC (8)
207.	US St Évarzec (9)	0–1	US Quimperoise (8)
208.	Locunolé Sports (10)	0–3	Fleur de Genêt Bannalec (9)
209.	JA St Servan (9)	1–0	Cercle Jules Ferry St Malo (8)
210.	FC Bord de Rance (10)	0–2	US St Jouan-des-Guérets (8)
211.	JS Picanaise (9)	3–0	AS St Pierraise Épiniac (10)
212.	Omnisport Suliaçais (11)	0–3	FC Tinténiac-St Domineuc (9)
213.	FC Meillac-Lanhélin-Bonnemain (9)	0–6	AS Jacques Cartier (8)
214.	ASE Lécousse (9)	0–2	Indépendante St Georges-de-Chesné (8)
215.	US Gosné (10)	0–5	Stade St Aubinais (8)
216.	FC Des Landes (10)	2–5	US St Marc/St Ouen (9)
217.	Fougères FC (10)	3–0	M'Lango Fougères Mayotte (11)
218.	US Bais (11)	1–2 (a.e.t.)	Avenir Domalain (10)
219.	AS Pyramide Lanfains (11)	1–3	US St Carreuc-Hénon (10)
220.	Les Vallées FC (10)	1–2	Évron FC (8)
221.	US Plumaugat (10)	1–3	AS Bobital (9)
222.	Melrand Sports (10)	2–1	AS Bubry (9)
223.	JA Arzano (9)	2–2 (3–1 p)	Stiren Cléguer FC (10)
224.	FC Kerchopine (10)	1–4	Caudan SF (9)
225.	VFL Keryado (10)	2–7	Lorient Sports (8)
226.	Fleur d'Ajonc Inzinzac (10)	1–4	St Efflam Kervignac (8)
227.	AS Penquesten (10)	4–5 (a.e.t.)	FOLC Lorient Ouest (9)
228.	ASC Baden (11)	0–1	ES Plescop (8)
229.	Paotred du Tarun (10)	1–1 (2–3 p)	ES Remungol (11)
230.	Avenir Buléon-Lantillac (11)	2–0 (a.e.t.)	St Pierre Pleugriffet (10)
231.	JA Peillac (10)	1–2	Armoricaine Péaule (9)
232.	US St Melaine Rieux (9)	0–4	FC Basse Vilaine (8)
233.	Montfort-Iffendic (9)	4–2	US Bédée-Pleumeleuc (8)
234.	US Gaël Muel (9)	2–2 (4–3 p)	US St Méen-St Onen (8)
235.	Entente Langan-La Chapelle-Chausée (11)	2–1	AS Romille (10)
236.	AS Vezin-le-Coquet (10)	2–4	Hermitage AC (8)
237.	AS Trédrez-Locquémeau (9)	0–1	ES Ploubazlanec (8)
238.	US Kerity (9)	4–1	CS Rospez (10)
239.	FC Trélévern-Trévou (9)	0–0 (6–7 p)	AS Grâces (8)
240.	US Maël-Carhaix (10)	3–1	ES Pestivien (11)
241.	ES Trébrivan (11)	0–8	Plounévez-Lanrivain-Trémargat US (10)
242.	US Pont-Péan (9)	1–2	FC Bruz (8)
243.	AC Rennes (9)	7–2	Châteaubourg-St Melanie FA (9)
244.	Gars de Plouénan (10)	2–1	US Lanmeur-Plouégat-Guérand (9)
245.	JS St Thonanaise (9)	0–4	AS Landeda (9)
246.	US Châteauneuf-du-Faou (10)	0–2	US Landeleau (9)
247.	Goulien Sports (11)	4–2 (Note: Goulien Sports penalised for fielding a suspended player. FC Goyen qualify. Original scoreline 4–2.)	FC Goyen (10)
248.	ES Landudec-Guiler (11)	1–3	JS Plogastel (10)
249.	ES Malahon-Confort (10)	1–4	Gourlizon Sport (9)
250.	FC Bigouden (10)	4–1	Kerlaz Sport (10)
251.	CA Forestois (10)	1–4	FC Pleuvennois (9)
252.	Marcassins Sportif Tréogat (10)	2–4	Standard Plomelin (10)
253.	FC Quimper Penhars (9)	1–0	Mélénicks Elliant (9)
254.	St Clair Réguiny (10)	2–0	Enfants de St Gildas (9)
255.	JA Pleucadeuc (10)	7–0	Avenir St Vincent-sur-Oust (11)
256.	FC Stéphanais Briçois (9)	1–0	La Chapelle-Fleurigné-Laignelet-Le Loroux (8)
257.	ES St Germain/Montours (9)	8–2	FC Baie du Mont St Michel (9)
258.	SC St Senoux (10)	1–1 (2–1 p)	US Guignen (9)
259.	Reveil Seglinois (11)	0–3	SC Goven (10)
260.	AS Montreuil-le-Gast (10)	0–2	US Gévezé (8)
261.	US Dourdain (9)	1–3	Espérance La Bouëxière (10)
262.	JS Nouvoitou (11)	3–1	ASC St Erblon (10)
263.	ES Brie (10)	2–3	US Vern-sur-Seiche (8)
264.	JS Allineuc (11)	2–1	FC Lié (9)
265.	Union Squiffiec-Trégonneau (10)	0–2	FC Trébeurden-Pleumeur-Bodou (8)
266.	US Ploubezre (8)	4–2	US Goudelin (9)
267.	FC Le Vieux Bourg (11)	0–3	ES Trégomeuroise (9)

== Second round ==
These matches were played on 2 September 2018.

Second round results: Bretagne
Tie no	Home team (tier)	Score	Away team (tier)
1.	St Thois Sports (10)	1–7	Dernières Cartouches Carhaix (8)
2.	Gars de Plonévez-du-Faou (9)	1–2	FC Quimperlois (7)
3.	AS Tréméven (11)	0–2 (a.e.t.)	ES Rédené (9)
4.	ES Gouézec (11)	0–6	US Moëlan (8)
5.	AS Kernével (11)	0–6	AC Carhaix (9)
6.	SS St Goazec (11)	0–2	FC Quimper Penhars (9)
7.	Plouyé Magic United (11)	0–4	Amicale Ergué-Gabéric (8)
8.	US St Thurien (11)	1–10	Stade Mellacois (8)
9.	Paotred Briec (8)	0–1	Quimper Kerfeunteun FC (7)
10.	US Landeleau (9)	3–3 (5–4 p)	AS Melgven (8)
11.	ES Langolen (10)	2–4	FC Aven-Bélon (10)
12.	Gourin FC (8)	1–2	EA Scaër (7)
13.	PB Spézet (9)	1–3	Fleur de Genêt Bannalec (9)
14.	US Lennon (10)	0–6	Glaziks de Coray (8)
15.	Lanvéoc Sports (9)	2–4	Quimper Ergué-Armel FC (8)
16.	Gourlizon Sport (9)	0–4	Stella Maris Douarnenez (7)
17.	JS Plogastel (10)	0–3	US Quimperoise (8)
18.	FC Pont-l'Abbé (8)	3–2	La Plozévetienne (8)
19.	US Pluguffan (9)	4–0	Standard Plomelin (10)
20.	ES Plogonnec (8)	0–1	Cormorans Sportif de Penmarc'h (7)
21.	FC Treffiagat-Guilvinec (9)	1–5	FC Pleuvennois (9)
22.	US Crozon-Morgat (9)	3–0	La Raquette Tréméoc (9)
23.	AS Plobannalec-Lesconil (7)	2–2 (3–1 p)	Amicale Italia Bretagne (7)
24.	Gas du Menez-Hom (9)	1–1 (3–4 p)	FC Penn-ar-Bed (9)
25.	FC Bigouden (10)	1–4	Plonéour FC (9)
26.	Espoir Clohars Fouesnant (9)	0–1	US Fouesnant (8)
27.	AS Loctudy (10)	1–0	AS Telgruc-sur-Mer (10)
28.	FC Lanhouarneau-Plounévez-Lochrist (9)	2–3 (a.e.t.)	ES Carantec-Henvic (8)
29.	Paotred Rosko (9)	0–1	JU Plougonven (8)
30.	ES Pleyber-Christ (9)	1–3	Gars de Plouénan (10)
31.	ES St Thégonnec (8)	3–2	Guiclan FC (8)
32.	US Cléder (8)	3–2	EF Plougourvest (9)
33.	AS Berven-Plouzévédé (9)	7–1	St Pierre Plouescat (9)
34.	AS Santec (8)	2–2 (3–4 p)	SC Morlaix (7)
35.	US Plouigneau (9)	0–3	Bodilis-Plougar FC (7)
36.	Étoile St Edern (9)	1–3	Étoile St Yves Ploudaniel (8)
37.	AS Sizun-Le Tréhou (10)	0–3	Landi FC (7)
38.	ES Plounéventer (9)	0–5	Landerneau FC (7)
39.	Stade Léonard Kreisker (9)	1–2	AS Scrignac (8)
40.	RC Loperhet (11)	0–8	AS Brest (7)
41.	Arzelliz Ploudalmézeau (9)	1–1 (3–5 p)	Vie au Grand Air Bohars (8)
42.	Hermine Kernilis (9)	1–3	FC Gouesnou (7)
43.	Étoile St Arzel (10)	1–3 (a.e.t.)	AS Guilers (8)
44.	AS Landeda (9)	0–3	St Pierre Milizac (7)
45.	AS Plouvien (8)	2–2 (4–3 p)	Gars de St Yves (7)
46.	ES Mignonne (9)	2–3 (a.e.t.)	US Plougonvelin (8)
47.	Espérance Plouguerneau (8)	0–1	CND Le Folgoët (8)
48.	ES Portsall Kersaint (8)	0–0 (4–1 p)	Étoile St Laurent (8)
49.	SC Lannilis (9)	3–3 (4–3 p)	Plougastel FC (7)
50.	FC Le Relecq-Kerhuon (8)	3–4 (a.e.t.)	AS Dirinon (9)
51.	AL Coataudon (10)	1–3	ASPTT Brest (8)
52.	Lapins de Guengat (10)	2–1	ES Plonéis (11)
53.	RC Lesnevien (7)	3–4 (a.e.t.)	AS St Martin-des-Champs (7)
54.	JS Picanaise (9)	0–1	FC Dinardais (7)
55.	Entente Samsonnaise Doloise (7)	4–0	US St Jouan-des-Guérets (8)
56.	La Cancalaise (8)	1–0	AS La Gouesnière (9)
57.	AS St Coulomb (10)	0–3 (Note: Tie won by forfeit.)	AS Miniac-Morvan (8)
58.	US St Guinoux (10)	0–3	AS Jacques Cartier (8)
59.	US Château-Malo (8)	2–1	JA St Servan (9)
60.	Jeunesse Combourgeoise (8)	2–0	FC Tinténiac-St Domineuc (9)
61.	ASC Romagné (8)	5–2	FC Stéphanais Briçois (9)
62.	Portes du Couesnon FC (11)	0–4	Indépendante St Georges-de-Chesné (8)
63.	US Val d'Izé (8)	0–2 (a.e.t.)	FC Sud Fougerais (9)
64.	FC Louvigné-La Bazouge (9)	2–0	Fougères FC (10)
65.	FC Marcillé-Bazouges-St Remy-Noyal (10)	2–5	ES St Germain/Montours (9)
66.	Stade St Aubinais (8)	5–1	US St Marc/St Ouen (9)
67.	Jeunes d'Argentré (7)	2–2 (5–4 p)	JA Balazé (8)
68.	Torcé-Vergéal FC (10)	0–7	La Vitréenne FC (7)
69.	Avenir Domalain (10)	0–3	AS Retiers-Coësmes (8)
70.	Stade Louvignéen (8)	4–4 (3–4 p)	US Domagné-St Didier (9)
71.	Châteaubourg FC (10)	0–2	US Janzé (8)
72.	Bleuets Le Pertre-Brielles-Gennes-St Cyr (9)	1–0	AS Étrelles (10)
73.	Haute Vilaine FC (10)	3–0	ES Taillis-St Christophe (10)
74.	OC Brétillien (11)	0–3	US Vern-sur-Seiche (8)
75.	JA Pipriac (9)	1–2 (a.e.t.)	US Ste Marie (10)
76.	SC Goven (10)	4–2 (a.e.t.)	SC St Senoux (10)
77.	US Gaël Muel (9)	0–4	FC Breteil-Talensac (7)
78.	JA Bréal (9)	1–7	OC Montauban (7)
79.	Eskouadenn de Brocéliande (8)	1–3	Montfort-Iffendic (9)
80.	FC Baulon-Lassy (10)	1–5	Avenir Irodouër (8)
81.	Entente Langan-La Chapelle-Chausée (11)	0–2	US Médréac (9)
82.	FC La Mézière-Melesse (9)	0–3	Cercle Paul Bert Bréquigny (7)
83.	SC Le Rheu (7)	2–0	US St Gilles (8)
84.	CO Pacéen (7)	0–0 (1–3 p)	US Gévezé (8)
85.	FC Chapelle-Cintré (11)	0–1	FC La Chapelle-Montgermont (8)
86.	Hermitage AC (8)	5–0	USC Chavagne (9)
87.	FC Beauregard Rennes (9)	0–4	US Liffré (7)
88.	US Illet Forêt (10)	0–2	US Grégorienne (7)
89.	Cercle Paul Bert Gayeulles (9)	0–2	ES Thorigné-Fouillard (7)
90.	AS Ercé-près-Liffré (10)	1–5	Noyal-Brécé FC (7)
91.	Espérance La Bouëxière (10)	2–2 (9–10 p)	CS Servon (7)
92.	FC Bruz (8)	1–0	AC Rennes (9)
93.	US Châteaugiron (8)	1–0	AS Chantepie (7)
94.	Avenir Lieuron (9)	1–2 (a.e.t.)	Cadets de Bains (7)
95.	JS Nouvoitou (11)	0–2	US Laillé (8)
96.	US Noyal-Chatillon (9)	0–4	Domloup Sport (8)
97.	Espérance Chartres-de-Bretagne (7)	3–0	US Bain (8)
98.	JS Cavan (8)	2–0	Trégor FC (9)
99.	Écureuils de Plourivo (10)	0–2	US Plouisy (8)
100.	US Pays Rochois (8)	1–2	UO Trégor (9)
101.	US Pluzunet-Tonquédec (9)	3–9	AS Pleubian-Pleumeur (7)
102.	AS Plestinaise (11)	1–4	AS Grâces (8)
103.	Stade Kénanais (11)	0–2	AS Servel-Lannion (8)
104.	FC Lizildry (11)	1–5	US Ploubezre (8)
105.	ES Ploubazlanec (8)	1–2	Étoile du Leff Boqueho (9)
106.	US Briacine (9)	1–1 (1–3 p)	JS Lanvollon (7)
107.	AS Pabu (11)	1–3	Goëlo FC (8)
108.	Plounévez-Lanrivain-Trémargat US (10)	1–4	Loudéac OSC (7)
109.	Rostrenen FC (8)	2–2 (2–3 p)	FC La Croix-Corlay (9)
110.	AS Kérien-Magoar (10)	0–3	RC Ploumagoar (7)
111.	US St Donan (10)	1–4	AS Trégueux (8)
112.	US Argoat-Pélem (9)	0–3 (a.e.t.)	Plaintel SF (7)
113.	ES Trégomeuroise (9)	0–5	CO Briochin Sportif Ploufraganais (7)
114.	Vigilante Plémet (9)	1–3	AS Uzel-Merléac (7)
115.	US St Carreuc-Hénon (10)	2–0	JS Allineuc (11)
116.	AS Motterieux (9)	2–1 (a.e.t.)	ASL St Julien (8)
117.	FC L'Hermitage Lorge (11)	1–3	JS Landéhen (9)
118.	Étoile Sud Armor Porhoët (10)	2–4	AS Broons-Trémeur (9)
119.	AS St Barnabé (11)	2–3 (a.e.t.)	Laurmené FC (8)
120.	US Trémorel (9)	0–5	Stade Pleudihennais (7)
121.	CS Lanrelas (9)	2–3	AS Trélivan (8)
122.	US Plouasne-St Juvat (9)	0–3	Plancoët-Arguenon FC (7)
123.	FC Plélan Vildé Corseul (9)	1–0	Ploufragan FC (7)
124.	St Brandan-Quintin FC (8)	0–3	US Quessoy (7)
125.	US Frémur-Fresnaye (8)	2–2 (4–1 p)	US Erquy (7)
126.	UF Yffiniac (10)	0–8	Plérin FC (8)
127.	FC Côte de Penthièvre (10)	3–5	AS Hillion-St René (8)
128.	US St Caradec (9)	2–0	US Maël-Carhaix (10)
129.	FC Plouagat-Châtelaudren-Lanrodec (8)	1–4	CS Plédran (7)
130.	Gouessant Foot Coëtmieux-Andel-Morieux-Pommeret (10)	1–1 (3–2 p)	Évron FC (8)
131.	AS Bobital (9)	1–0	US Brusvily (9)
132.	FC St Bugan (8)	1–2	ES Penguily (8)
133.	FC Trébeurden-Pleumeur-Bodou (8)	10–0	US Kerity (9)
134.	ES Pommerit-Le Merzer (9)	0–5	US Perros-Louannec (8)
135.	FC Ploemeur (8)	3–1	ES Sud Outre Rade (7)
136.	AS Guermeur (10)	0–9	La Guideloise (8)
137.	Lorient Sports (8)	3–2	AS Gestel (9)
138.	FOLC Lorient Ouest (9)	1–4	CS Quéven (8)
139.	Caudan SF (9)	2–1	FC Plouay (7)
140.	AS Calanaise (9)	2–0	Melrand Sports (10)
141.	FC Meslan (10)	0–5	Avenir Guiscriff (9)
142.	AS Priziac (10)	6–2	AS Kergrist (11)
143.	FL Inguiniel (10)	1–3	JA Arzano (9)
144.	FC Klegereg (9)	1–1 (3–4 p)	Espérance Bréhan (8)
145.	Riantec OC (9)	0–5	US Goëlands de Larmor-Plage (7)
146.	Stade Guémenois (10)	1–2	FC Naizin (8)
147.	Plouhinec FC (9)	0–1	AS Lanester (8)
148.	AS Bélugas Belz (9)	1–0	Erdeven-Étel (10)
149.	CS Pluméliau (8)	1–4	Baud FC (7)
150.	Guénin Sport (8)	1–0	Moutons Blanc de Noyal-Pontivy (7)
151.	CS Pluneret (10)	0–1	US Brech (9)
152.	ES Remungol (11)	3–4 (a.e.t.)	St Clair Réguiny (10)
153.	Garde St Eloi Kerfourn (9)	0–1	AS Cruguel (7)
154.	La Locminoise (10)	0–2 (a.e.t.)	Avenir Buléon-Lantillac (11)
155.	Plumelin Sports (8)	1–4	Languidic FC (7)
156.	AS Moustoir-Ac (9)	0–1	Garde St Cyr Moréac (8)
157.	EFC St Jean Brévelay (8)	2–1	Garde du Loch (9)
158.	Semeurs de Grand-Champ (9)	1–1 (1–2 p)	ES Mériadec (10)
159.	ES Plescop (8)	0–0 (3–4 p)	ES Crac'h (9)
160.	ES St Avé (8)	2–1	Séné FC (7)
161.	US Arradon (8)	5–0	Carnac FC (9)
162.	AS Ménimur (8)	2–1	Elvinoise Foot (8)
163.	Bleuets Néant-sur-Yvel (10)	1–2	Ecureils Roc-St André (9)
164.	Aurore de Taupont (9)	7–0	Glaneurs de Notre Dame Lizio (10)
165.	CS Josselin (9)	0–1	CS Bignan (8)
166.	Avenir St Servant-sur-Oust (8)	0–1	US Le Cours (9)
167.	Enfants de Guer (8)	1–0	Les Fougerêts-St Martin-sur-Oust (9)
168.	US St Abraham Chapelle-Caro (8)	4–2 (a.e.t.)	Montagnards Sulniac (9)
169.	Fondelienne Carentoir (9)	1–3	Espoir St Jacut-les-Pins (10)
170.	Ruffiac-Malestroit (8)	4–2	Muzillac OS (9)
171.	CS St Gaudence Allaire (9)	4–2	JA Pleucadeuc (10)
172.	St Sébastien Caden (9)	1–3	Bogue D'Or Questembert (8)
173.	Armoricaine Péaule (9)	1–1 (3–0 p)	Landaul Sports (8)
174.	Garde du Pont Marzan (8)	0–4	Keriolets de Pluvigner (7)
175.	FC Basse Vilaine (8)	1–1 (7–6 p)	Damgan-Ambon Sport (9)
176.	AS St Eloi La Vraie-Croix (9)	2–3	AS Turcs de l'Ouest (10)
177.	Entente St Gilloise (11)	1–5	ES Merlevenez (8)
178.	FC St Perreux (9)	0–1	US La Gacilly (8)
179.	St Efflam Kervignac (8)	5–1	Stade Landévantais (9)
180.	Indépendante Mauronnaise (9)	0–7	Ploërmel FC (7)
181.	ES Ploemel (8)	3–0	FC Quiberon St Pierre (7)
182.	FC Goyen (10)	1–3	ES Beuzec (9)

== Third round ==
These matches were played on 15 and 16 September 2018.

Third round results: Bretagne
Tie no	Home team (tier)	Score	Away team (tier)
1.	St Clair Réguiny (10)	0–1	GSI Pontivy (5)
2.	US Domagné-St Didier (9)	0–4	FC Atlantique Vilaine (5)
3.	La Guideloise (8)	1–2	ES Ploemel (8)
4.	ES Mériadec (10)	1–5 (a.e.t.)	AS Ménimur (8)
5.	AS Bélugas Belz (9)	0–4	Keriolets de Pluvigner (7)
6.	Espérance Bréhan (8)	4–1	ES St Avé (8)
7.	Avenir Buléon-Lantillac (11)	0–2	Armoricaine Péaule (9)
8.	AS Priziac (10)	3–6	US St Abraham Chapelle-Caro (8)
9.	Enfants de Guer (8)	1–0 (a.e.t.)	CEP Lorient (6)
10.	Ploërmel FC (7)	2–3	US Montagnarde (5)
11.	Caudan SF (9)	2–1	AS Calanaise (9)
12.	Avenir Guiscriff (9)	1–1 (3–4 p)	ES Crac'h (9)
13.	CS St Gaudence Allaire (9)	0–5	Saint-Colomban Sportive Locminé (5)
14.	Baud FC (7)	5–0	FC Ploemeur (8)
15.	US Le Cours (9)	0–5	Lorient Sports (8)
16.	Languidic FC (7)	2–0	Garde St Cyr Moréac (8)
17.	Espoir St Jacut-les-Pins (10)	2–3	Bogue D'Or Questembert (8)
18.	St Efflam Kervignac (8)	3–1	Ruffiac-Malestroit (8)
19.	JA Arzano (9)	0–4	CS Quéven (8)
20.	US La Gacilly (8)	2–1 (a.e.t.)	FC Basse Vilaine (8)
21.	AS Turcs de l'Ouest (10)	1–3	US Arradon (8)
22.	CS Bignan (8)	3–0	EFC St Jean Brévelay (8)
23.	US Goëlands de Larmor-Plage (7)	0–5	Avenir Theix (6)
24.	FC Naizin (8)	1–1 (3–1 p)	Guénin Sport (8)
25.	Aurore de Taupont (9)	1–4	Auray FC (6)
26.	AS Lanester (8)	9–0	Ecureils Roc-St André (9)
27.	AS Cruguel (7)	2–4 (a.e.t.)	Stade Pontivyen (5)
28.	US Brech (9)	3–1	ES Merlevenez (8)
29.	Lapins de Guengat (10)	0–10	Plouzané AC (5)
30.	FC Quimper Penhars (9)	0–2	Quimper Kerfeunteun FC (7)
31.	US Crozon-Morgat (9)	4–1	AS Loctudy (10)
32.	St Pierre Milizac (7)	4–0	Quimper Ergué-Armel FC (8)
33.	US Plougonvelin (8)	0–2	US Quimperoise (8)
34.	ASPTT Brest (8)	0–0 (4–2 p)	FC Gouesnou (7)
35.	CND Le Folgoët (8)	2–0	SC Lannilis (9)
36.	AS Dirinon (9)	2–1 (a.e.t.)	AS Brest (7)
37.	AS Guilers (8)	3–0	ES Portsall Kersaint (8)
38.	Vie au Grand Air Bohars (8)	0–2	Stella Maris Douarnenez (7)
39.	ES Beuzec (9)	0–2	AS Plobannalec-Lesconil (7)
40.	US Pluguffan (9)	1–4	Châteaulin FC (6)
41.	FC Penn-ar-Bed (9)	1–2	Cormorans Sportif de Penmarc'h (7)
42.	PD Ergué-Gabéric (6)	1–2	EA St Renan (6)
43.	Plonéour FC (9)	4–1	Étoile St Yves Ploudaniel (8)
44.	AS Plouvien (8)	1–2	FC Pont-l'Abbé (8)
45.	Gars de Plouénan (10)	2–3	ES Carantec-Henvic (8)
46.	Landerneau FC (7)	1–0	US Moëlan (8)
47.	FC Pleuvennois (9)	1–2 (a.e.t.)	FC Quimperlois (7)
48.	Glaziks de Coray (8)	1–0	Bodilis-Plougar FC (7)
49.	ES Rédené (9)	0–7	Stade Plabennécois (5)
50.	SC Morlaix (7)	0–2	AG Plouvorn (6)
51.	FC Aven-Bélon (10)	0–3	US Landeleau (9)
52.	AS Berven-Plouzévédé (9)	2–3 (a.e.t.)	Landi FC (7)
53.	Stade Mellacois (8)	0–1	Amicale Ergué-Gabéric (8)
54.	JU Plougonven (8)	1–3	AS Scrignac (8)
55.	US Fouesnant (8)	0–1 (a.e.t.)	US Trégunc (6)
56.	Fleur de Genêt Bannalec (9)	6–1	AC Carhaix (9)
57.	US Cléder (8)	1–4	Guipavas GdR (6)
58.	EA Scaër (7)	3–1	ES St Thégonnec (8)
59.	Dernières Cartouches Carhaix (8)	0–5	AS St Martin-des-Champs (7)
60.	US Ploubezre (8)	2–1	Stade Paimpolais FC (6)
61.	AS Grâces (8)	3–0	UO Trégor (9)
62.	Goëlo FC (8)	0–2	JS Lanvollon (7)
63.	Plaintel SF (7)	2–0	RC Ploumagoar (7)
64.	CO Briochin Sportif Ploufraganais (7)	5–1	JS Cavan (8)
65.	AS Servel-Lannion (8)	2–2 (5–4 p)	Plérin FC (8)
66.	Étoile du Leff Boqueho (9)	0–3	CS Bégard (6)
67.	US Perros-Louannec (8)	0–1 (a.e.t.)	Lannion FC (5)
68.	FC La Croix-Corlay (9)	1–4	AS Pleubian-Pleumeur (7)
69.	US Quessoy (7)	0–0 (7–6 p)	Lamballe FC (6)
70.	AS Bobital (9)	2–6	Stade Pleudihennais (7)
71.	JS Landéhen (9)	1–3	US Frémur-Fresnaye (8)
72.	Plancoët-Arguenon FC (7)	2–0	AS Trégueux (8)
73.	AS Broons-Trémeur (9)	3–4	Laurmené FC (8)
74.	Loudéac OSC (7)	3–2	AS Ginglin Cesson (6)
75.	AS Trélivan (8)	5–2	US Langueux (6)
76.	US St Carreuc-Hénon (10)	0–1	AS Hillion-St René (8)
77.	AS Uzel-Merléac (7)	2–1	FC Trébeurden-Pleumeur-Bodou (8)
78.	US Plouisy (8)	1–0	US St Caradec (9)
79.	Gouessant Foot Coëtmieux-Andel-Morieux-Pommeret (10)	0–2	CS Plédran (7)
80.	ES Penguily (8)	1–5	Dinan-Léhon FC (5)
81.	FC Plélan Vildé Corseul (9)	0–0 (5–3 p)	AS Motterieux (9)
82.	US Gévezé (8)	0–1	ES Thorigné-Fouillard (7)
83.	US Médréac (9)	0–1	ASC Romagné (8)
84.	US Liffré (7)	2–0	La Cancalaise (8)
85.	Avenir Irodouër (8)	2–2 (4–2 p)	FC Sud Fougerais (9)
86.	FC Dinardais (7)	3–1	Stade St Aubinais (8)
87.	FC Louvigné-La Bazouge (9)	3–2	Haute Vilaine FC (10)
88.	AS Miniac-Morvan (8)	1–1 (2–4 p)	US Grégorienne (7)
89.	ES St Germain/Montours (9)	2–0	FC La Chapelle-Montgermont (8)
90.	US Château-Malo (8)	0–2	TA Rennes (5)
91.	Indépendante St Georges-de-Chesné (8)	0–6	Fougères AGLD (5)
92.	AS Vignoc-Hédé-Guipel (6)	3–1	Entente Samsonnaise Doloise (7)
93.	OC Cesson (6)	3–1	OC Montauban (7)
94.	AS Jacques Cartier (8)	1–0	Jeunesse Combourgeoise (8)
95.	US Laillé (8)	1–2 (a.e.t.)	US Vern-sur-Seiche (8)
96.	Cadets de Bains (7)	2–3	Hermitage AC (8)
97.	Noyal-Brécé FC (7)	1–0	CS Servon (7)
98.	AS Retiers-Coësmes (8)	1–0	Bleuets Le Pertre-Brielles-Gennes-St Cyr (9)
99.	La Vitréenne FC (7)	1–0	Espérance Chartres-de-Bretagne (7)
100.	Cercle Paul Bert Bréquigny (7)	3–1	RC Rannée-La Guerche-Drouges (6)
101.	US Ste Marie (10)	0–3	Jeunes d'Argentré (7)
102.	US Janzé (8)	0–1	FC Guichen (6)
103.	FC Bruz (8)	1–0	FC Guipry-Messac (6)
104.	SC Goven (10)	0–4	Domloup Sport (8)
105.	Montfort-Iffendic (9)	1–6	FC Breteil-Talensac (7)
106.	US Châteaugiron (8)	1–2	SC Le Rheu (7)

== Fourth round ==
These matches were played on 29 and 30 September 2018.

Fourth round results: Bretagne
Tie no	Home team (tier)	Score	Away team (tier)
1.	US Landeleau (9)	0–2	AS Dirinon (9)
2.	Plonéour FC (9)	1–4 (a.e.t.)	Landerneau FC (7)
3.	Landi FC (7)	1–2	Guipavas GdR (6)
4.	FC Pont-l'Abbé (8)	2–1	AS Guilers (8)
5.	Fleur de Genêt Bannalec (9)	0–3	FC Quimperlois (7)
6.	St Pierre Milizac (7)	1–4	Stade Plabennécois (5)
7.	AS Scrignac (8)	0–2	ASPTT Brest (8)
8.	Quimper Kerfeunteun FC (7)	1–1 (6–7 p)	Stella Maris Douarnenez (7)
9.	US Crozon-Morgat (9)	1–6	EA St Renan (6)
10.	Amicale Ergué-Gabéric (8)	1–4	Stade Briochin (4)
11.	US Quimperoise (8)	4–1	Glaziks de Coray (8)
12.	CND Le Folgoët (8)	0–2	Plouzané AC (5)
13.	ES Carantec-Henvic (8)	2–1	EA Scaër (7)
14.	Cormorans Sportif de Penmarc'h (7)	1–0 (a.e.t.)	AS Plobannalec-Lesconil (7)
15.	Châteaulin FC (6)	0–2	US Trégunc (6)
16.	AS Jacques Cartier (8)	2–4	CO Briochin Sportif Ploufraganais (7)
17.	CS Bégard (6)	1–0	AS Trélivan (8)
18.	Plaintel SF (7)	1–2	Dinan-Léhon FC (5)
19.	AS Servel-Lannion (8)	0–5	US Saint-Malo (4)
20.	CS Plédran (7)	1–2	US Quessoy (7)
21.	Laurmené FC (8)	2–3	US Ploubezre (8)
22.	US Frémur-Fresnaye (8)	0–1	AG Plouvorn (6)
23.	US Plouisy (8)	1–4	FC Dinardais (7)
24.	AS St Martin-des-Champs (7)	3–1	JS Lanvollon (7)
25.	FC Plélan Vildé Corseul (9)	0–1	Lannion FC (5)
26.	Stade Pleudihennais (7)	1–0	AS Uzel-Merléac (7)
27.	AS Grâces (8)	1–2	Plancoët-Arguenon FC (7)
28.	AS Hillion-St René (8)	0–1	AS Pleubian-Pleumeur' (7)
29.	Baud FC (7)	0–2	Stade Pontivyen (5)
30.	Lorient Sports (8)	1–5	Languidic FC (7)
31.	Keriolets de Pluvigner (7)	4–0	FC Naizin (8)
32.	ES Ploemel (8)	1–2	Auray FC (6)
33.	Saint-Colomban Sportive Locminé (5)	1–1 (4–5 p)	Vannes OC (4)
34.	US Arradon (8)	0–3	Avenir Theix (6)
35.	CS Bignan (8)	2–1	US Brech (9)
36.	St Efflam Kervignac (8)	0–2	US Montagnarde (5)
37.	Bogue D'Or Questembert (8)	1–0	CS Quéven (8)
38.	AS Ménimur (8)	7–1	Caudan SF (9)
39.	ES Crac'h (9)	1–2 (a.e.t.)	Espérance Bréhan (8)
40.	Armoricaine Péaule (9)	0–1	Loudéac OSC (7)
41.	AS Lanester (8)	1–6	GSI Pontivy (5)
42.	Hermitage AC (8)	2–2 (1–4 p)	AS Vitré (4)
43.	FC Bruz (8)	1–0	Cercle Paul Bert Bréquigny (7)
44.	Enfants de Guer (8)	0–1	La Vitréenne FC (7)
45.	Jeunes d'Argentré (7)	1–3	US Liffré (7)
46.	Domloup Sport (8)	0–2	OC Cesson (6)
47.	AS Retiers-Coësmes (8)	1–3	TA Rennes (5)
48.	ES St Germain/Montours (9)	0–1	Noyal-Brécé FC (7)
49.	ASC Romagné (8)	0–7	Fougères AGLD (5)
50.	US Vern-sur-Seiche (8)	0–2	ES Thorigné-Fouillard (7)
51.	FC Breteil-Talensac (7)	2–0	Avenir Irodouër (8)
52.	US Grégorienne (7)	0–0 (3–5 p)	AS Vignoc-Hédé-Guipel (6)
53.	FC Louvigné-La Bazouge (9)	1–6	SC Le Rheu (7)
54.	US La Gacilly (8)	0–4	FC Atlantique Vilaine (5)
55.	US St Abraham Chapelle-Caro (8)	0–5	FC Guichen (6)

== Fifth round ==
These matches were played on 13 and 14 October 2018.

Fifth round results: Bretagne
Tie no	Home team (tier)	Score	Away team (tier)
1.	Auray FC (6)	3–0	Cormorans Sportif de Penmarc'h (7)
2.	CO Briochin Sportif Ploufraganais (7)	1–0	AS St Martin-des-Champs (7)
3.	Stella Maris Douarnenez (7)	4–0	AS Pleubian-Pleumeur' (7)
4.	US Trégunc (6)	4–1	CS Bégard (6)
5.	ES Carantec-Henvic (8)	3–1	US Quimperoise (8)
6.	Keriolets de Pluvigner (7)	0–2	Stade Plabennécois (5)
7.	Lannion FC (5)	2–1	Plouzané AC (5)
8.	Languidic FC (7)	0–2	US Montagnarde (5)
9.	US Ploubezre (8)	1–2	Guipavas GdR (6)
10.	FC Pont-l'Abbé (8)	0–6	Stade Briochin (4)
11.	EA St Renan (6)	1–2 (a.e.t.)	US Concarneau (3)
12.	ASPTT Brest (8)	0–1	FC Quimperlois (7)
13.	AS Dirinon (9)	0–5	AG Plouvorn (6)
14.	Landerneau FC (7)	0–3	Vannes OC (4)
15.	SC Le Rheu (7)	3–1	CS Bignan (8)
16.	Plancoët-Arguenon FC (7)	0–1	Avenir Theix (6)
17.	FC Bruz (8)	1–2 (a.e.t.)	AS Vignoc-Hédé-Guipel (6)
18.	US Quessoy (7)	1–2 (a.e.t.)	FC Dinardais (7)
19.	La Vitréenne FC (7)	0–4	OC Cesson (6)
20.	Bogue D'Or Questembert (8)	0–4	AS Vitré (4)
21.	ES Thorigné-Fouillard (7)	1–5	Fougères AGLD (5)
22.	US Liffré (7)	2–1 (a.e.t.)	AS Ménimur (8)
23.	Loudéac OSC (7)	2–0	TA Rennes (5)
24.	Noyal-Brécé FC (7)	1–1 (3–4 p)	FC Atlantique Vilaine (5)
25.	Espérance Bréhan (8)	0–2 (a.e.t.)	Stade Pleudihennais (7)
26.	FC Breteil-Talensac (7)	1–2	Stade Pontivyen (5)
27.	US Saint-Malo (4)	4–2 (a.e.t.)	Dinan-Léhon FC (5)
28.	FC Guichen (6)	0–1	GSI Pontivy (5)

== Sixth round ==
These matches were played on 27 and 28 October 2018.

Sixth round results: Normandy
Tie no	Home team (tier)	Score	Away team (tier)
1.	FC Rouen (5)	0–1	USON Mondeville (6)
2.	US Avranches (3)	1–0	US Granville (4)
3.	CMS Oissel (4)	1–0	US Quevilly-Rouen (3)
4.	Bourguébus-Soliers FC (7)	1–2	Grand-Quevilly FC (6)
5.	AL Déville-Maromme (5)	1–3	AG Caennaise (6)
6.	AS Cherbourg Football (5)	0–0 (4–3 p)	FC Dieppe (5)
7.	AJS Ouistreham (7)	2–2 (2–4 p)	AS Villers Houlgate Côte Fleurie (8)
8.	Évreux FC 27 (5)	1–2	FC Saint-Lô Manche (5)
