= Yannick Plissonneau =

French footballer (born 1956)

Yannick Plissonneau (born 28 March 1956) is a French former football player and manager.

Plissonneau was born in Pornic, Loire-Atlantique. As a player, he was a defender who played in Division 2 for Amicale de Lucé and US Orléans. With the latter club, he played in the 1980 Coupe de France Final against AS Monaco, and made the cross which led to Roger Marette's equalising goal, but Monaco won the match 3–1.

As a manager, he led Luçon to the last 32 of the 2001–02 Coupe de France, took charge of AS Angoulême-Charente briefly in 2003, took over at Amicale de Lucé in 2004, led them to promotion to the Division d'Honneur in 2008, and left during the 2008–09 season.

== Honours ==
Orléans

- Coupe de France runner-up: 1979–80
