= Luçon FC =

French football club

Luçon
- Full name: Luçon Football Club
- Founded: 1924; 102 years ago
- Ground: Stade Jean de Mouzon
- Capacity: 5000, 500 seated
- Chairman: Xavier Auger
- Manager: André Glotin
- League: Régional 3, Pays de la Loire
- Website: http://club.quomodo.com/lucon-football-club

Luçon Football Club is a French football club, located in Luçon, Vendee. They were founded in 1924 as Stade Luçonnais. In 2003 they changed their name to Vendée Luçon Football. In 2016 they rebranded to its current name. As of the 2025–26 season, the club plays in the Régional 3 of the Pays de la Loire regional league, at the eighth tier of French football.

== History ==
Old logo from 2016-2020

The club was founded in 1924. It became champion of the Division d'Honneur of the Centre-West regional league for the first time in 1933. In 1966 it joined the newly formed Atlantic regional league and competed in the Division d'Honneur there until 1978.

In 1978 the club finished second in the Atlantic Division d'Honneur and won promotion to inaugural season of Division 4 of the new French football league system, finishing fourth. In 1982 the club was relegated back to the Division d'Honneur, but won promotion again as champions a year later. In 1986 the club was relegated again.

In 1989 and 1990 the club won back to back promotions, reaching for the first time the third level of the French football league system, then called Division 3. They stayed at this level for three seasons, until the league was reorganised in 1993, and they were placed in National 2 at the fourth level. Relegation followed again in 1994 to the fifth level, where the club stayed until 2000 when they were relegated again, back to the Division d'Honneur Atlantic region.

In 2002, at the second attempt, the club were champion of Division d'Honneur Atlantic region and won promotion to what was now Championnat de France Amateur 2. In 2003 the club rebranded itself as Vendée Luçon Football. In 2008 the club won promotion to the fourth level, Championnat de France Amateur.

The club had its best performance in the Coupe de France in 2012, reaching the round of 32 where they lost 2–0 to Olympique Lyonnais.

In 2013 the club again won promotion to the third level, Championnat National. and 2015 they finished fifth, their highest league position to date. A year later, despite finishing 11th in 2016 they were relegated for financial reasons.

The club filed for bankruptcy, and reformed to play in the seventh level of French football as Luçon FC for the 2016–17 season.

== Honours ==
- Champion DH Centre-Ouest: 1933
- Champion DH Atlantique: 1983, 1989, 2002

== Notable former players ==
(Democratic Republic of the Congo)

- Vital N'Simba

(France)

- Michel Pageaud
- Jonathan Ringayen

(Guinea)

- Benjamin Feindouno

(Togo)

- Richmond Forson

== Notable former coaches ==
- Pierre Mosca
- Yannick Plissonneau
