= SC Toulon =

French football club

Toulon
- Full name: Sporting Club Toulon
- Founded: 1944; 82 years ago
- Ground: Stade Bon Rencontre, Toulon
- Capacity: 8,200
- Chairman: Jacques Jayet
- Head coach: Mohamed Sadani
- League: National 1 Group A
- 2024–25: National 2 Group A, 3rd
- Website: www.sctoulon.fr
Home colours	Away colours	Third colours

Sporting Club Toulon is a football club from Toulon, France, that plays in the Championnat National 1, the fourth tier of the French football league system. The club was founded in 1944 and played under that name until the 1999–2000 season when they were administratively reformed as Sporting Toulon Var. In 2016, Sporting Toulon Var merged with SC Toulon-Le Las to become Sporting Club Toulon once again.

== History ==
Former logo.

Sporting Club Toulon was founded in 1944 after a merge between Sporting Club du Temple and Jeunesse Sportive Toulonnaise during the Vichy France regime.

=== Genesis (1944-1982) ===
After World War II it joined the French second division and left for only one season in 1946–1947. After eleven years in the second division, the club reached the highest division in France in 1959, after finishing third in the second division, but was relegated the year after. Toulon has never won the French Cup, but has reached the semi-final on two occasions: in 1963 and 1984. Semi-finalists in 1963, Toulon was eliminated by Olympique Lyonnais. The following year, they finished fourth and were promoted again to the first division, without success.

=== Division 1 and further relegations (1983-1998) ===
Relegated to the French 3rd division during 1980–1981 season, Toulon was growing stronger in the 1980s. Thanks to the effectiveness of Christian Dalger as a forward, the talent of the leader Alain Bénédet and the experience of Rolland Courbis in defence, Toulon was again promoted to the first division in 1983, finishing first in Group B, before Stade de Reims, thanks to a victory away to Grenoble (1–5).

During the 1983–1984 season, Toulon stayed in Division 1 thanks to the 21 goals of Delio Onnis, top scorer in the league that season. The club again reached the semi-finals of the Coupe de France but were defeated by AS Monaco (1–4, 2–1).

The following season saw Toulon shining and beating Paris Saint-Germain 5–1. Still third after 31 matches played, they were then defeated three times in a row – including another defeat against AS Monaco at home, 1–0, in front of 18,000 spectators at Stade Mayol, which remains the best performance for the club until now. This demoted them to 5th place, but still put them in contention for qualification to European competition, going into the last game of the season. But a last defeat at home against FC Nantes Atlantique meant the club finished in 6th position, outside the European places.

In 1988, the Toulon team including Bernard Casoni, Bernard Pardo and David Ginola, with former player Rolland Courbis as coach, finished 5th in the league but failed to qualify for a European competition due to a weak UEFA coefficient at this time.

After several years of uncertainty, the club was relegated in 1993 to the Championnat National – the third level of French football – due to financial problems. The 1995–1996 season saw Toulon winning the title in National and promotion to Ligue 2. During the 16th final of the French Cup, they eliminated Girondins de Bordeaux where Zinedine Zidane was playing (3–2 et) before being beaten on penalties by Montpellier HSC in the next round. Improvements lasted only two years and in 1998, Sporting Club Toulon were relegated back to the Championnat National due to poor results, then administratively in CFA2 (5th level) and finally did not finish the championship because of liquidation.

=== Back to the amateur level (1999-2015) ===
After financial difficulties which led the club to be expelled from the Championship in the 1998–1999 season and to turn amateur, the club was reborn under the name "Sporting Toulon Var", gaining three promotions in four seasons to reach the third division. Candidate to access the 2nd division in 2006–2007, they were relegated in 2007 to the French 4th division (CFA).

In 2011, DNCG (Direction Nationale de Controle de Gestion) excluded the club from all national competitions and the club started again in Division d'Honneur (6th division) in 2011–2012. A new manager Mohamed Sadani was appointed at the beginning of the 2013–14 season, and after several years struggling in Division d'Honneur, the club won the championship and finally gained promotion to CFA 2, 5th national level.

=== Merger and return to old name (2016-present) ===
In February 2016, the club announced a merger with SC Toulon-Le Las, of the CFA. The new club would take the historic name Sporting Club Toulon and play in CFA, with the reserves in CFA2.

In 2019 the club won promotion from National 2 as champion of their group. They were relegated the following year after being placed bottom of the league when the 2019–20 Championnat National season was ended prematurely due to the COVID-19 pandemic. Toulon have played in National 2 ever since and will compete in this league throughout the upcoming 2025–2026 season.

== Honours ==
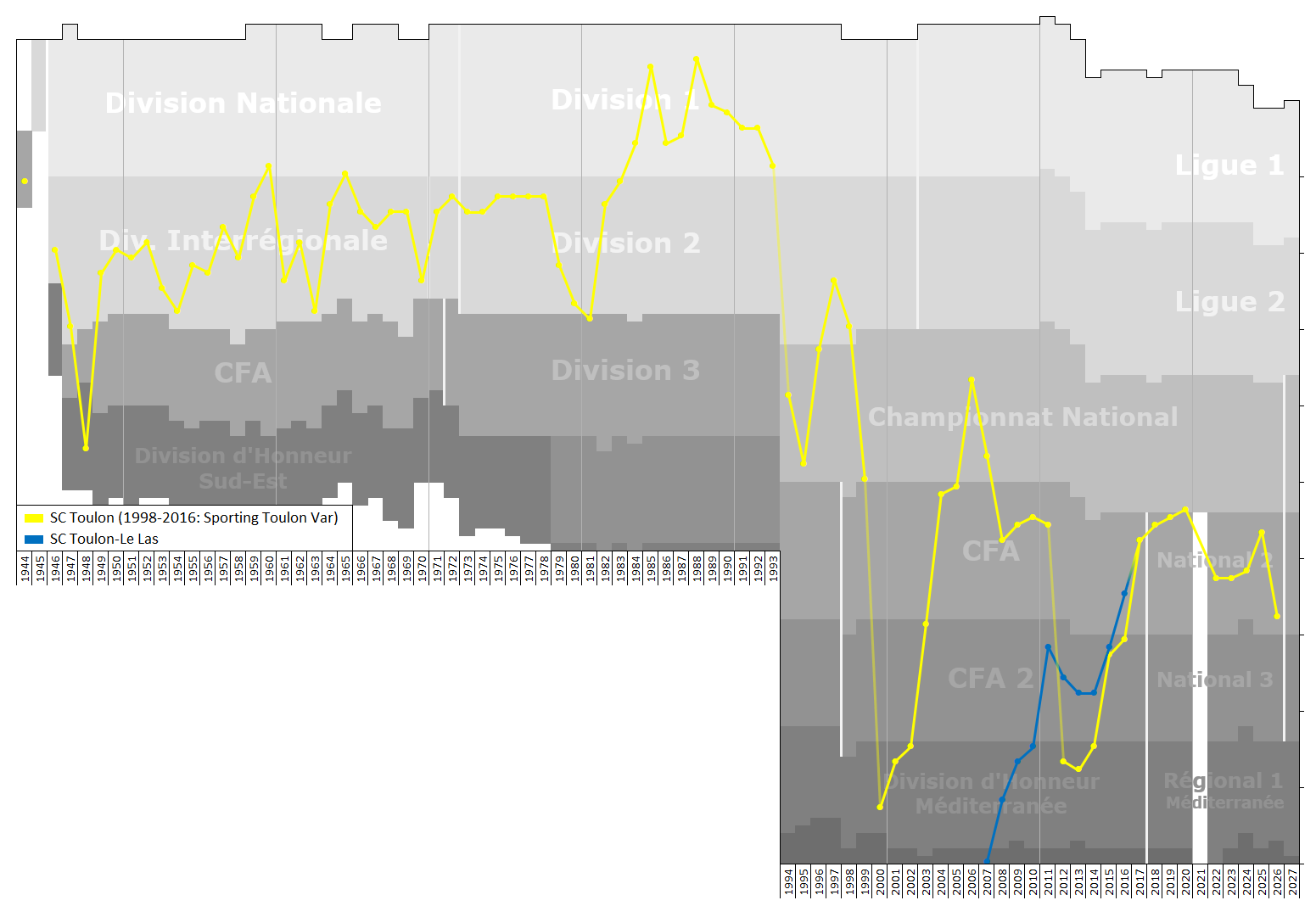
Historical league performance chart of SC Toulon

- Ligue 2
  - Winners (1): 1983
- Championnat National
  - Winners (1): 1996
- Championnat National 2
  - Winners (1): 2019 (Group A)
- Coupe de France
  - Semi-finalists (2): 1963, 1984
- Coupe Gambardella
  - Runners-up (1): 1966

== Current squad ==
As of 22 December 2020

Note: Flags indicate national team as defined under FIFA eligibility rules; some limited exceptions apply. Players may hold more than one non-FIFA nationality.

No.	Pos.	Nation	Player
2	DF	FRA	Matéo Baury
3	DF	COM	Ahmed Soilihi
4	DF	FRA	Anthony Ouasfane
5	MF	FRA	Evan Gafour
6	MF	FRA	Aboubakar Touré
7	FW	FRA	Thibault Vialla
8	FW	MLI	Diawoye Diarra
9	FW	FRA	Abdelkrim Khaled
10	MF	FRA	Youness Diatta
11	FW	FRA	Kamel Bennekrouf
13	DF	FRA	Maxime Allione
14	DF	ALG	Abdeldjalil Bouameur
15	DF	CAN	Gabriel Mikina

No.	Pos.	Nation	Player
17	FW	FRA	Marius Reymond
18	MF	CAF	Gabriel Oualengbe (on loan from Paris)
19	DF	FRA	Merhez Belkhechine
20	DF	COM	Nassim Ahmed
21	MF	FRA	Amir Nouri
22	FW	GBS	David Gomis
25	DF	FRA	Lorenzo Vinci
26	MF	FRA	Baptiste Rivière
27	DF	MAD	Nomena Andriantiana
28	FW	SEN	Abdoulaye Diallo
30	GK	MTQ	Christopher Dilo
31	DF	FRA	Baptiste Guyot

== Notable players ==
- (France) Thierno Barry (youth)
- (France) Franck Honorat (youth)
- (France) Frank Leboeuf (youth)

== Managers ==
- 1945–1948: Charles Roviglione
- 1948–1951: Lucien Troupel
- 1951–1953: Francis Maestroni
- 1953–1959: Gabriel Robert
- 1959–1960: André Gerard
- 1960–1963: Marcel Duval
- 1963–1967: Hervé Mirouze
- 1967–1970: Jean Luciano
- 1970–1972: Marcel Duval
- 1972–1973: Jean Luciano
- 1973–1978: Marcel Duval
- 1978–1979: Celestin Oliver
- 1979–1980: Pierre Sinibaldi
- 1980–1985: Marcel Duval
- 1985 – Feb 1986: Christian Dalger
- 1986 – Oct 1986: Paul Orsatti
- 1986 – Feb 1990: Rolland Courbis
- 1990–1991: Delio Onnis
- 1991: Pierre Mosca
- 1991–1992: Guy David
- 1992–1993: Robert Dewilder
- 1993–1995: Jean-Louis Bérenguier
- 1995–1996: Gennaro Luigi Alfano
- 1996–1997: François Bracci
- 1997 – Nov 1997: Albert Emon
- 1997–1998: Christian Dalger
- 1998-1998: Gennaro Luigi Alfano
- 1998–1999: Roger Martucci
- 1999–2001: François Zahoui
- 2001–2003: Dragan Cvetkovic
- 2003–2006: Jean-Louis Garcia
- 2006–2007: Hubert Velud
- 2007–2008: André Blanc
- 2008–2010: Dragan Cvetković
- 2010–2011: Franck Zingaro
- 2011–2012: Gennaro Luigi Alfano
- 2013: Kader Ferhaoui
- 2013–2016: Mohamed Sadani
- 2016–2017: Dominique Veilex
- 2017: Gennaro Luigi Alfano
- 2017–2018: William Prunier
- 2018–2019: Fabien Pujo
- 2019–2020: Victor Zvunka
- 2020–2021: Luigi Alfano and Karim Masmoudi
- 2021–2026: Ludovic Batelli
