= Robert Dewilder =

French footballer (born 1943)

Personal information
- Date of birth: 6 March 1943 (age 83)
- Place of birth: Paris, France
- Position: Midfielder

Senior career*
Years	Team	Apps	(Gls)
1962–1966	Boulogne		
1966–1969	Sochaux		
1969–1972	Monaco	69	(3)
1972–1973	Toulon		
1973–1977	Boulogne		
1977–1978	Quimper		
1978–1979	Blois		

Managerial career
- 1977–1978: Quimper
- 1978–1981: Blois
- 1981–1984: Limoges
- 1984–1986: Brest
- 1986–1987: Limoges
- 1987–1990: Nancy
- 1990–1992: Mulhouse
- 1992–1993: Toulon
- 1994–1996: Valenciennes
- 1998–1999: Boulogne
- * Club domestic league appearances and goals

Robert Dewilder (born 6 March 1943) is a French former football player and manager.

== Playing career ==
Dewilder played as a midfielder for Boulogne, Sochaux, Monaco, Toulon, Quimper and Blois.

== Coaching career ==
He managed Quimper, Blois, Limoges, Brest, Nancy, Mulhouse, Toulon, Valenciennes and Boulogne.
