= Marcel Mao =

French footballer (born 1937)

Personal information
- Date of birth: 1937 (age 88–89)
- Place of birth: France
- Position: Forward

Senior career*
Years	Team	Apps	(Gls)
- Quimper
- Stade Français
- Quevilly-Rouen
- Quimper

Managerial career
- 1971–1974: Quimper
- Wallis and Futuna
- 2000: Chad
- New Caledonia
- Tafea F.C.
- * Club domestic league appearances and goals

Marcel Mao (born 1937) is a French former football player and manager.

== Career ==
At the age of 16, Mao joined the first team of Quimper. He played as a forward.

In 1982–83 he was the assistant coach of the French national U17 team.

After working as head coach of Quimper Kerfeunteun, Wallis and Futuna, Chad, and New Caledonia, he was appointed head coach of Tafea in Vanuatu to help them prepare for the OFC Champions League.

== Personal life ==
He is the father of Philippe Mao.
