= Pierre Garcia =

French footballer and manager (1943–2023)

Personal information
- Date of birth: 27 July 1943
- Place of birth: El-Affroun, French Algeria
- Date of death: 13 February 2023 (aged 79)
- Position: Midfielder

Senior career*
Years	Team	Apps	(Gls)
- Stade Briochin
1970–1972	Rennes		

Managerial career
- 1973–1979: Stade Briochin
- 1979–1982: Rennes
- 1982–1985: SC Abbeville
- 1985–1987: Stade Quimpérois
- 1987–1988: Angers
- 1988–1990: Stade Quimpérois
- 1990–1991: Rouen
- 1991–1994: Gazélec Ajaccio
- 1994–1995: Brest
- 1996–1998: Créteil
- * Club domestic league appearances and goals

Pierre Garcia (27 July 1943 – 13 February 2023) was a French football player and manager. He played for Rennes in the French Ligue 1. Garcia died on 13 February 2023, at the age of 79.

== Honours ==
Rennes

- Coupe de France: 1970–71
