= Stade de Penvillers =

Football stadium in Quimper, France

Coordinates: 48°00′32″N 4°05′57″W

- Le Congélateur du Coin, Penvillers
- Interactive map of Stade de Penvillers
- Full name: Complexe sportif de Penvillers
- Location: Place Léon Jouhaux; 29000 Quimper, France
- Capacity: 7,758
- Surface: Grass
- Record attendance: 20,020 (February 10, 1979, SLK - ASSE)

Construction
- Opened: 25 August 1968
- Renovated: 1976-1979, 1989-1996 et 2022-2026

Tenants
- Quimper Kerfeunteun F.C. Quimper Athlétisme; Quimper Italia

Stade de Penvillers is a multi-use stadium in Quimper, France. It is currently used mostly for football matches and is the home stadium of Quimper Kerfeunteun F.C. The stadium is able to hold 7,758 spectators.

The stadium is named Stade de Penvillers because this is the area where the stadium is located.
