= Patrick Viot =

French footballer (1952–2021)

Personal information
- Date of birth: 25 May 1952
- Place of birth: Orléans, France
- Date of death: 16 March 2021 (aged 68)
- Place of death: Orléans, France
- Height: 1.80 m (5 ft 11 in)
- Position: Goalkeeper

Youth career
- 1970–1976: Arago Orléans
- 1976–1980: Orléans

Senior career*
Years	Team	Apps	(Gls)
1980–1991	Orléans	240	(0)
Total		240	(0)
- * Club domestic league appearances and goals

Patrick Viot (French: [patʁik vjo]; 25 May 1952 – 16 March 2021) was a French footballer. He played as a goalkeeper for US Orléans from 1980 to 1991, helping them reach the Coupe de France final in 1980.

== Biography ==
Born in Orléans, Viot began his amateur career with Arago Orléans, where he played from 1970 to 1976. He then continued his amateur career with US Orléans, becoming professional in 1980. In his first professional year, he helped his team reach the final of the Coupe de France. During the match, a controversial penalty kick caused AS Monaco to take a 2–1 lead, and ultimately won the game 3–1. He played in 240 matches for Orléans, retiring in 1991. He then worked as a mechanic in Saran alongside his friend, Joël Mauger. Their shop was called "Mauger Viot".

Viot died in Orléans on 16 March 2021 at the age of 68.
