= Dimitry Caloin =

French-born Malagasy footballer (born 1990)

Personal information
- Full name: Dimitry Caloin
- Date of birth: 8 May 1990 (age 36)
- Place of birth: Limoges, France
- Height: 1.93 m (6 ft 4 in)
- Position: Midfielder

Team information
- Current team: FC Villefranche
- Number: 5

Youth career
- 2007–2010: Toulouse
- 2010–2012: Limoges FC

Senior career*
| Years | Team | Apps | (Gls) |
| 2012–2017 | Limoges FC | 118 | (14) |
| 2017–2018 | Cholet | 21 | (0) |
| 2018–2019 | Les Herbiers | 19 | (1) |
| 2019– | FC Villefranche | 5 | (0) |

International career^{‡}
| 2017– | Madagascar | 10 | (0) |
- * Club domestic league appearances and goals as of 23:07, 19 December 2019 (UTC) ‡ National team caps and goals as of 09:56, 14 July 2019 (UTC)

Dimitry Caloin (born 8 May 1990) is a professional footballer who plays for FC Villefranche. Born in France, he represents Madagascar at international level.

== Professional career ==
A youth product of FC Toulouse, Caloin moved to Limoges FC for seven years, eventually becoming vice-captain of the team. In the summer of 2017, he was transferred to SO Cholet in the Championnat National. He spent the 2018–19 season with Les Herbiers VF, and signed for FC Villefranche in August 2019.

== International career ==
Caloin is born in France, and is of Malagasy descent through his mother. He made his debut for the Madagascar national football team in a 3–1 2019 Africa Cup of Nations qualification win over Sudan on 9 June 2017.

== Career statistics ==
=== International ===
As of matches played on 14 July 2019

Madagascar national team
| Year | Apps | Goals |
| 2017 | 1 | 0 |
| 2018 | 3 | 0 |
| 2019 | 2 | 0 |
| Total | 6 | 0 |
