= Roger Pohon =

French footballer and manager (1940–2025)

Personal information
- Date of birth: 25 January 1940
- Place of birth: Trignac, France
- Date of death: 13 February 2025 (aged 85)
- Height: 1.70 m (5 ft 7 in)
- Position: Midfielder

Senior career*
Years	Team	Apps	(Gls)
1958–1963	Nantes	15	(4)
1963–1975	Quimper	78	(9)
Total		93	(13)

International career
?–?	France Amateurs	2	(?)

Managerial career
- ?–?: AS Plouhinec
- 1992–1995: Quimper
- * Club domestic league appearances and goals

Roger Pohon (25 January 1940 – 13 February 2025) was a French football player and manager who played as a midfielder.

== Biography ==
Born on 25 January 1940, Pohon played professionally for Nantes and Quimper, as well as the France Amateurs before coaching at AS Plouhinec and Quimper.

Pohon died on 13 February 2025, at the age of 85.
