= Jonathan Ringayen =

French footballer (born 1988)

Personal information
- Full name: Jonathan Ringayen
- Date of birth: 27 September 1988 (age 38)
- Place of birth: La Roche-sur-Yon, France
- Height: 1.78 m (5 ft 10 in)
- Position: Defender

Team information
- Current team: La Roche VF

Senior career*
Years	Team	Apps	(Gls)
2008–2009	Les Sables-d'Olonne		
2009–2010	Luçon	24	(2)
2010–2012	Guingamp	36	(1)
2012–2013	Fréjus Saint-Raphaël	28	(0)
2013–2014	Vannes	29	(1)
2014–2015	Amiens	29	(2)
2015–2016	Luçon	29	(1)
2016–2018	Créteil	32	(0)
2018–2020	Bergerac Foot	35	(2)
2020–	La Roche VF	4	(1)
- * Club domestic league appearances and goals as of 1 July 2021

Jonathan Ringayen (born 27 September 1988) is a French former professional footballer who plays as a defender for La Roche VF. He played three matches in Ligue 2 for Guingamp during the 2011–12 season.
