= Dragan Cvetković =

Yugoslav footballer (born 1961)

Personal information
- Date of birth: 19 September 1961 (age 65)
- Place of birth: Slavonski Brod, SFR Yugoslavia
- Height: 1.78 m (5 ft 10 in)
- Position: Midfielder

Senior career*
Years	Team	Apps	(Gls)
1979–1980	INF Vichy		
1980–1984	Besançon RC	25	(0)
1984–1985	Bastia	1	(0)
1985–1986	RCP Fontainebleau		
1986–1987	Montluçon		
1987–1990	ES Saintes		
1990–1991	Bergerac		
1992–1994	Bergerac		

Managerial career
- 2001–2003: Toulon
- 2004: Alania Vladikavkaz (asst.)
- Al Wahda
- Al-Rayyan
- 2008: JSM Béjaïa
- 2008–2010: Toulon
- 2010–2011: Hammam-Lif
- 2011: Al-Wehda
- 2012: Monastir
- 2012–2013: Hammam-Lif
- 2013: Marsa
- 2014: Kairouan
- 2014: Étoile Sahel
- 2016–2017: Limoges
- 2019–2020: TP Mazembe (technical director)
- 2020: TP Mazembe
- 2021–2022: ASJ Soyaux Charente (women)
- 2022: FC Balagne
- * Club domestic league appearances and goals

Dragan Cvetković (Serbian Cyrillic: Драган Цветковић; born 19 September 1961) is a Serbian football coach and a former professional player.

He coached Étoile du Sahel.

In June 2016 he became coach of Limoges FC.

He joined TP Mazembe in January 2019 as Technical Director.
