= 1979–80 Coupe de France =

Tournament details
- Country: France

The 1979–80 Coupe de France was the 63rd Coupe de France, France's annual national football cup competition. It was won by AS Monaco, who defeated US Orléans in the final.

== Round of 16 ==
Team 1	Agg.	Team 2	1st leg	2nd leg
Valenciennes FC (D1)	2–3	FC Sochaux-Montbéliard (D1)	2–0	0–3
AS Saint-Étienne (D1)	6–3	OGC Nice (D1)	4–1	2–2
AS Monaco (D1)	4–2	Lille OSC (D1)	4–0	0–2
RC Lens (D1)	5–6	Montpellier HSC (D2)	5–4	0–2
FC Metz (D1)	2–3	AJ Auxerre (D2)	2–2	0–1
Stade Rennais (D2)	2–4	Paris FC (D2)	2–0	0–4
AS Angoulême (D2)	2–1	Stade de Reims (D2)	2–0	0–1
US Orléans (D2)	3–1	Besançon RC (D2)	1–0	2–1

== Quarter-finals ==
Team 1	Agg.	Team 2	1st leg	2nd leg
FC Sochaux-Montbéliard (D1)	1–1 (3–4 p)	AS Monaco (D1)	1–0	0–1 (a.e.t.)
Montpellier HSC (D2)	1–1 (a)	AS Saint-Étienne (D1)	0–0	1–1
AS Angoulême (D2)	3–5	US Orléans (D2)	2–0	1–5
Paris FC (D2)	3–1	AJ Auxerre (D2)	1–1	2–0

== Semi-finals ==
=== First leg ===
30 May 1980

Monaco (1)	2–1	Montpellier (2)
Petit 10'; Onnis 18'		Vergnes 73'

Stade Louis II, Monaco
Attendance: 9,643
Referee: Ottorino Di Bernardo

30 May 1980

Orléans (2)	3–1	Paris FC (2)
Albaladéjo 29'; Germain 74'; Lemée 78'		Vendrely 49'

Stade de la Source, Orléans
Attendance: 12,000
Referee: Alain Delmer

=== Second leg ===
3 June 1980

Montpellier (2)	2–4 (a.e.t.)	Monaco (1)
Ouattara 13'; Durand 68'		Christophe 64'; Ricort 97'; Onnis 100'; Emon 112'

Stade de la Mosson, Montpellier
Attendance: 16,219
Referee: Michel Vautrot

Monaco won 6–3 on aggregate.

3 June 1980

Paris FC (2)	2–1	Orléans (2)
Eo 8'; Knockaert 59'		Marette 62'

Stade Déjerine, Paris
Attendance: 30,601
Referee: Achille Verbecke

Orléans won 4–3 on aggregate.

== Final ==
7 June 1980

Monaco	3–1	Orléans
Marette 6' (o.g.); Emon 47'; Onnis 66'		Marette 24'

Parc des Princes, Paris
Attendance: 46,136
Referee: Georges Konrath
