= Limoges Football =

French football club

- Full name: Limoges Football
- Founded: 31 May 1947; 79 years ago
- Ground: Stade Saint-Lazare; Limoges
- Capacity: 3,000
- Chairman: Michel Robert
- Manager: Vincent Villedieu
- League: Régional 1
- 2025–26: Régional 1 Nouvelle-Aquitaine A, 6th of 14
- Website: limogesfootball.fr
Home colours	Away colours

Limoges Football (French: [limɔʒ]) is an association football club based in Limoges, France. Founded in 1947 as Limoges Football Club, the team underwent several name changes, becoming Limoges Foot 87 from 1987 to 2003 before reverting to its original name, Limoges FC. The club competes in Régional 1, the sixth tier of the French football league system, and hosts matches at the Stade Saint-Lazare, which has a capacity of 3,000.

In January 2020, the original entity was placed into compulsory liquidation, resulting in the dissolution of the senior men's teams. The sporting rights were transferred to a new entity, Limoges Football, which resumed activities for youth and women's teams. The senior men's program restarted in the 2020–21 season at the lowest league level, Départemental 1, following a ruling by the French Football Federation (FFF). Despite this setback, the club achieved two consecutive promotions, reaching Régional 2 by 2023 and Régional 1 by 2025.

The club played in Division 1 from 1958 to 1961.

== History ==
Limoges Football Club was formed in 1947 through a merger of two rival clubs, Red Star Athlétique de Limoges (founded 1917) and Star Limousin Université Club (founded 1906). In 1957, after playing the majority of their first ten years at the top level of amateur football, they gained professional status, and became part of an expanded French Division 2. They finished third in the table, which gained them promotion to the top division.

The club stayed in French Division 1 for three seasons, with their highest finish being 10th in 1959–60. From relegation in 1961 until 1987, the club competed in Division 2 or Division 3. They came close to promotion back to Division 1 in both 1964 and 1965, qualifying for the playoffs on both occasions. Twice during this period they reached the quarter-final of the Coupe de France, losing after extra time to Stade de Reims in 1962–63 and to Stade Rennais over two legs in 1969–70. At the end of the 1972–73 season they were relegated to Division 3, returning to Division 2 in 1977.

In June 1987, despite a seventh-place finish in Division 2, the leaders of the club declared bankruptcy with a debt of more than five million francs. The club, reborn under the title Limoges Foot 87, were administratively relegated to French Division 4.

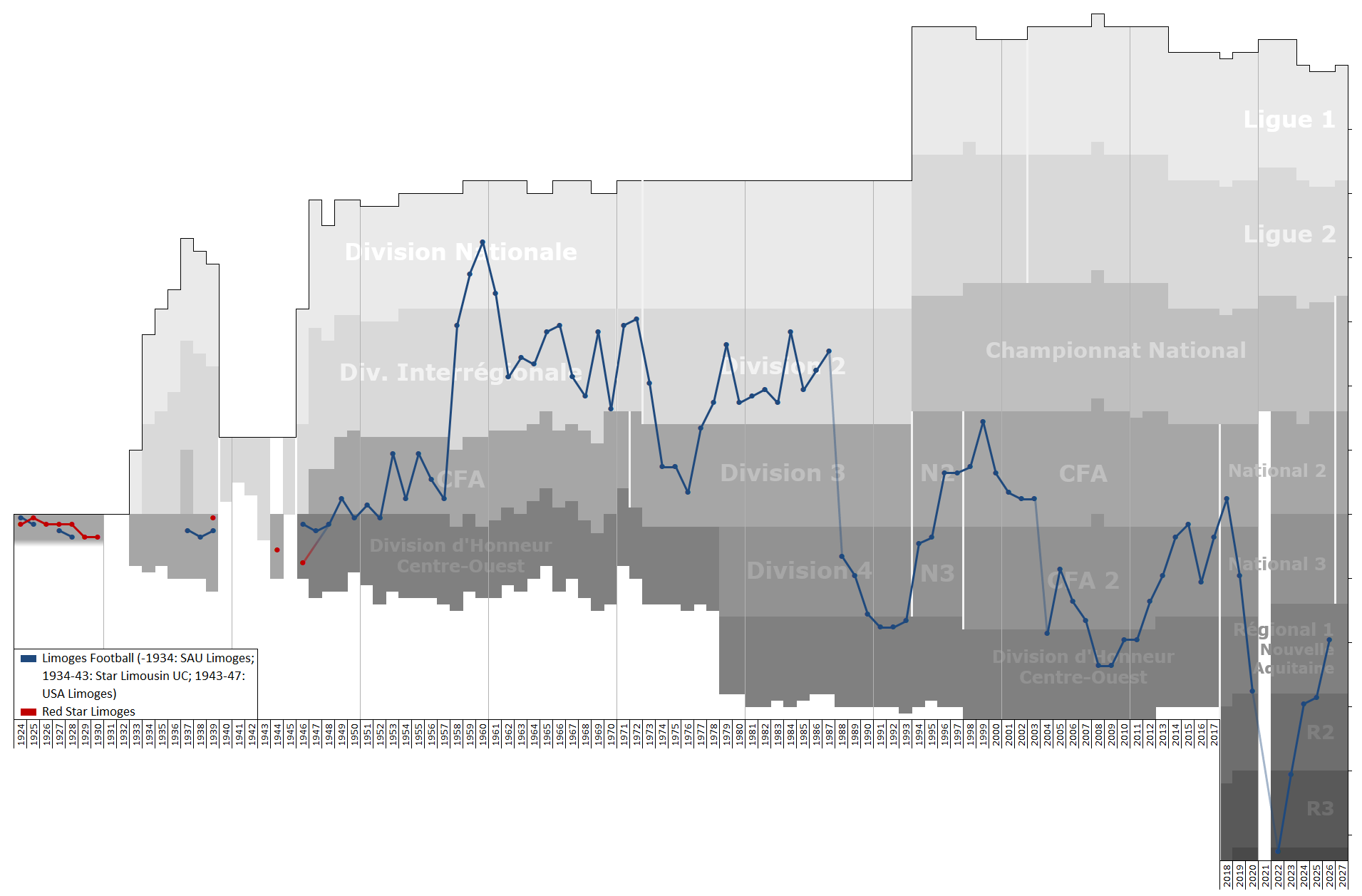
Historical league performance chart of Limoges Football

From 1987 to 2003, the club played at the fourth and fifth levels of French football. At the end of the 2002–03 season, the club was again forced into bankruptcy, and were administratively relegated to level 6 of the French football league system; Limoges Foot 87 was dissolved, and the reborn club took back the old title of Limoges Football Club.

The club won promotion back to Championnat de France amateur 2 immediately, as champions of the 2003–04 Division d'Honneur Centre-Ouest (Centre-West) group. They spent time at level five and six until 2014 when they won promotion to level 4 from Championnat de France Amateur 2, but were relegated again in 2014–15.

In 2017 the club won promotion to the new fourth level Championnat National 2, but despite finishing 12th in their group in 2017–18 they were relegated administratively back to the fifth level after being placed into administration during the season. At the end of the 2018–19 season they were relegated administratively again to the Regional league due to not being in compliance with the financial rules of the competition.

In January 2020 the club was placed into compulsory liquidation, with the senior men's teams declaring forfeit. The sporting rights of the club were assigned to a new entity, Limoges Football, by the FFF on 24 January 2020, ensuring continuation of junior and women's football at the club. The future of the senior men's teams would be defined at the end of the 2019–20 season.

Ultimately, due to the general forfeiture of the first team, the FFF ruled that Limoges Football must restart the senior men's program in the ninth-tier Départemental 1 (D1) for the 2020–21 season, in line with its general regulations.

Despite the challenges, the club achieved two consecutive promotions, reaching Régional 2 (R2) by 2023. This comeback, just three years after the club's liquidation, culminated in a decisive 1–0 victory against ES Nouaillé in the final match of the Régional 3 season at the Stade Saint-Lazare.

== Notable players ==
French international players:

- Benoît Badiashile
- Raymond Cicci
- Yvon Goujon
- Laurent Koscielny
- Armand Penverne
- François Remetter
- Paul Sauvage

Madagascan international players:

- Dimitry Caloin

== Managerial history ==
- 1951–55: Camille Cottin
- 1957–62: Pierre Flamion
- 1962–66: Maurice Blondel
- 1966–68: Roger Meerseman
- 1968–69: Maurice Blondel
- 1969–70: Maurice Cailleton
- 1970–72: Yvon Goujon
- 1972–74: Maurice Cailleton
- 1974–75: Henri Kowal
- 1975: Slobodan Stojovic
- 1975–78: Henri Kowal
- 1978–81: Henri Skiba
- 1981–84: Robert Dewilder
- 1984–85: Francis Smerecki
- 1985–86: Yves Todorov
- 1986–87: Robert Dewilder
- 1987–88: Pierre Soria
- 1988–89: Gérard Fontenay and Jacques Mouilleron
- 1989–90: Bastian Lassalle
- 1990–97: Eddie Hudanski
- 1997–2000: Colbert Marlot
- 2000–01: Jean-Yves Kerjean
- 2001–02: Jacky Lemée
- 2002–03: Christophe Matl
- 2003–06: Stéphane Roussy
- 2006–07: Jean-Jacques Eydelie
- 2007–09: Pierre Soria
- 2009–11: Christophe Lassudrie
- 2011–14: Vincent Gaudron
- 2014–15: Vincent Gaudron and Nicolas Le Bellec
- 2015–16: Nicolas Le Bellec and Francis Lautréte
- 2016–18: Dragan Cvetković
- 2018–20: Colbert Marlot
- 2020–21: Fabien Parverie
- 2021–23: Fabien Daguin
- 2023–24: Necim Luciani
- 2024–present: Dragan Cvetković
