= Christian Dalger =

French footballer (1949–2023)

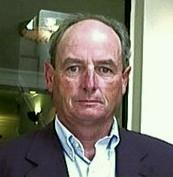

Personal information
- Date of birth: 18 December 1949
- Place of birth: Nîmes, France
- Date of death: 1 July 2023 (aged 73)
- Height: 1.68 m (5 ft 6 in)
- Position: Forward

Youth career
- 1961–1962: Cheminots de Nîmes
- 1962–?: Toulon

Senior career*
Years	Team	Apps	(Gls)
–1971	Toulon		
1971–1980	Monaco		
1980–1984	Toulon		

International career
1974–1978	France	6	(2)

Managerial career
- 1983–1986: Toulon
- 1986–1988: Grenoble
- 1990–1997: ES Vitrolles
- 1997–1998: Toulon
- 1999: FC Martigues
- 2002–2003: Mali
- 2006–2008: US Marignane
- 2009–2010: RC Kouba
- 2010–2012: US Le Pontet
- 2012–2013: US Marignane
- * Club domestic league appearances and goals

Christian Dalger (18 December 1949 – 1 July 2023) was a French professional footballer who played as a forward. He made six international caps for France, scoring two goals.

During his career he played for clubs including SC Toulon (1962–1971) and AS Monaco (1971–1980), with whom he won the French title in 1978. He was a member of the France national team in the 1978 FIFA World Cup. After his professional career he became a football manager.

Dalger died on 1 July 2023, at the age of 73.
