= Quimper Kerfeunteun FC =

French football club

Quimper
- Full name: Quimper Kerfeunteun Football Club
- Nickname: Stade Q
- Founded: 1905; 121 years ago
- Ground: Stade de Penvillers; Quimper; France
- Capacity: 7,758
- Manager: Saïf Basli
- League: Brittany Football League
- Website: quimperkerfeunteunfc.org
Home colours	Away colours

Quimper Kerfeunteun Football Club, commonly known as Quimper, is a French football team from the city of Quimper, Finistère, who play in the Brittany Football League of the Régional 1, the sixth division of French football. The team used to be known as Stade Quimpérois.

== History ==
The team was founded in 1905. Its major achievement came in the 1970s and 1980s when it played in the Division 2. Its best result was a fourth place in 1988–89. The club had financial problems in 1997. In the 2006–07 season, they escaped from regional level (DH Bretagne, 6th division) and came back at a national level. They today play in the 8th division.

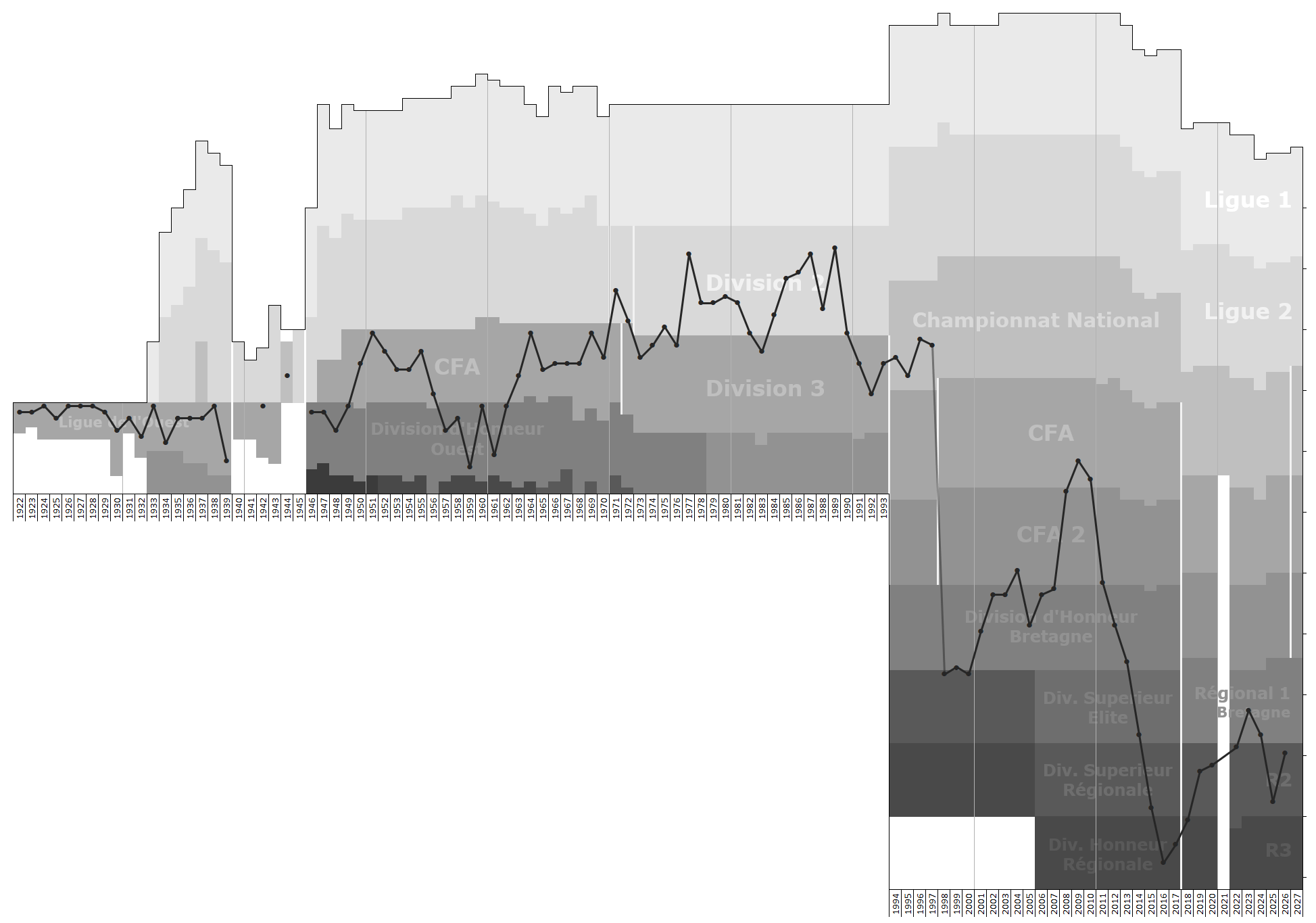
Historical league performance chart of Quimper Kerfeunteun FC

The team has a women's section, which played in the 3rd division.

== Current squad ==
Note: Flags indicate national team as defined under FIFA eligibility rules; some limited exceptions apply. Players may hold more than one non-FIFA nationality.

No.	Pos.	Nation	Player
—	GK	FRA	Jean-Marc Le Gall
—	GK	FRA	Sébastien Guiriec
—	GK	FRA	Pierre Penhouet
—	DF	FRA	Julien Bonizec
—	DF	FRA	Latif Doumbia
—	DF	FRA	Guillaume Le Nours
—	DF	FRA	Adrien Le Bec
—	DF	FRA	Florent Lenclume
—	DF	FRA	Tidiane Sturm
—	DF	FRA	Arnaud Péron
—	MF	FRA	Marc Salaun
—	MF	MTQ	Dario Brulu
—	MF	GUI	Mamadou Cali-Djalo

No.	Pos.	Nation	Player
—	MF	FRA	Jordan Celton
—	MF	COD	Guylain Buyoyo
—	MF	FRA	Florian Le Gouil
—	MF	FRA	Anthony Le Page
—	MF	FRA	Kévin Croguennec
—	MF	FRA	Maxime Autret
—	FW	FRA	Guillaume Le Floch
—	FW	FRA	Gérald Le Hacaut
—	FW	GNB	Idrissa Soares Cassama
—	FW	FRA	Nordine Haddu

== Managerial history ==
- (France) Pierre Philippe: ?-?
- (France) Edmond Lemaître: 1959–1971
- (France) Marcel Mao: 1971–1974
- (France) Robert Dewilder: 1977–1978
- (France) Jean Brélivet: 1978–1979
- (France) Joël Le Bris: 1979–1981
- (France) Marc Rastoll: 1981 – January 1983
- (France) Jacky Castellan: 1983–1984
- (Poland) Wlodzimierz Lubanski: 1984–1985
- (France) Pierre Garcia: 1985–1987
- (France) Georges Peyroche: 1987–1988
- (France) Pierre Garcia: 1988–1990
- (France) Marc Rastoll: 1990–1993
- (France) Roger Pohon: 1993 – February 1995
- (France) Raymond Kéruzoré: February 1995 – January 1996
- (France) Yvon Leroux: February 1996 – 1996
- (France) Noël Tosi: 1996 – March 1997
- (France) Jean Brélivet and Jean-Paul Thomas: March 1997 – 1997
- (France) Jean-Paul Thomas: March 1997 – 2001
- (France) Pascal Laguiller: 2003 – 2005
- (France) Ronan Salaün: 2005 –
