= Jacques Lemée =

French footballer and manager (born 1946)

Jacky Lemée
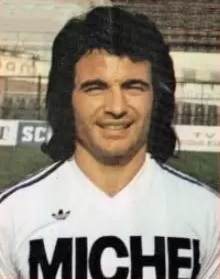
- Lemée in 1975

Personal information
- Date of birth: 26 June 1946 (age 80)
- Place of birth: Epernon, France
- Height: 1.71 m (5 ft 7 in)
- Position: Defender

Youth career
- 1958–1964: Chartres

Senior career*
Years	Team	Apps	(Gls)
1964–1965	Orléans		
1965–1967	Stade Français		
1967–1970	Metz	66	(12)
1970–1971	Strasbourg		
1971–1974	Angers		
1974–1976	Marseille	55	(0)
1976–1977	Laval		
1977–1986	Orléans		

Managerial career
- 1977–1988: Orléans
- 1989: Châteauroux
- 1989–1990: Reims
- 1990–1993: Créteil
- 1994–1997: Orléans
- 2000: Red Star
- 2001: Thouars
- 2001–2002: Limoges
- 2002–2003: Mulhouse
- 2003–2004: Meaux
- 2005–2006: Angers
- 2015–2018: FC Chartres
- 2019–2020: FC Saint-Jean-le-Blanc
- * Club domestic league appearances and goals

Jacques "Jacky" Lemée (born 26 June 1946) is a French football manager and former player. He played as a defender for Orléans, Stade Français, Metz, Strasbourg, Angers, Marseille, Laval.

Lemée also enjoyed a career as a manager with Orléans, Châteauroux, Reims, Créteil, Red Star, Limoges, Mulhouse and Angers. In January 2019, he was appointed manager of FC Saint-Jean-le-Blanc.
