= Didier Christophe =

French footballer (born 1956)

Personal information
- Date of birth: 8 December 1956 (age 69)
- Place of birth: Sainte-Colombe-lès-Vienne, France
- Position: Midfielder

Youth career
- 1973–1976: INF Vichy

Senior career*
Years	Team	Apps	(Gls)
1976–1982	Monaco		
1982–1984	Lille		
1984–1985	Toulouse		
1985–1987	Rennes		
1987–1988	Reims		
1988–1990	Grenoble		

International career
1980–1981	France	6	(1)

Managerial career
- 2004–2005: Bourg-en-Bresse
- 2010–2011: Pau FC
- * Club domestic league appearances and goals

Didier Christophe (born 8 December 1956) is a French football manager and former professional player who played as a midfielder.
