= Albert Emon =

French footballer and manager (born 1953)

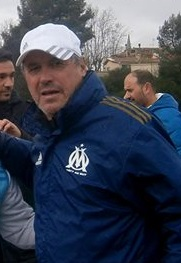
- Emon in 2014

Personal information
- Date of birth: 24 June 1953 (age 73)
- Place of birth: Berre-l'Étang, France
- Height: 1.79 m (5 ft 10 in)
- Position: Striker

Youth career
- 1963–1968: CO Berre

Senior career*
Years	Team	Apps	(Gls)
1968–1977	Marseille	133	(38)
1977–1978	Reims	6	(4)
1978–1981	Monaco	57	(22)
1981–1983	Lyon	60	(17)
1983–1986	Toulon	103	(21)
1986–1988	Cannes	63	(15)
Total		422	(117)

International career
1975–1980	France	8	(1)

Managerial career
- 1992–1996: Nice
- 1997: Toulon
- 2001–2002: Marseille
- 2006–2007: Marseille
- 2009–2011: Cannes
- 2012–2013: Ajaccio
- * Club domestic league appearances and goals

Albert Emon (born 24 June 1953) is a French football manager and former player. He was most recently in charge of the Ligue 1 club Ajaccio.

== Club career ==
As a player, Emon won the Ligue 1 with Marseille in 1972 and the Coupe de France in 1980 with Monaco. Emon also played for Reims and Lyon.

== International career ==
Emon won eight caps and scored one goal for the France national team.

== Coaching career ==
Emon coached Marseille in 2007 before being replaced by Eric Gerets. On 7 June 2009, he signed a three-year contract with Cannes.
